= 57th Primetime Creative Arts Emmy Awards =

2005 American television programming awards

- Date: September 11, 2005
- Location: Shrine Auditorium; Los Angeles, California
- Presented by: Academy of Television Arts & Sciences
- Most awards: The Life and Death of Peter Sellers (6)

The 57th Primetime Creative Arts Emmy Awards honored the best in artistic and technical achievement in American prime time television programming from June 1, 2004, until May 31, 2005, as chosen by the Academy of Television Arts & Sciences. The awards were presented on September 11, 2005, at the Shrine Auditorium in Los Angeles, California. A total of 75 Creative Arts Emmys were handed out across 65 categories. The ceremony preceded the 57th Primetime Emmy Awards, held on September 18.

The movie The Life and Death of Peter Sellers led all programs with six wins, followed by Deadwood with five wins and Lost with four wins. For overall program fields, awards went to Broadway: The American Musical, Classical Baby, Death in Gaza, Extreme Makeover: Home Edition, 58th Annual Tony Awards, Nick News with Linda Ellerbee, South Park, Star Wars: Clone Wars, Stephen Sondheim's "Passion" (Live From Lincoln Center), and Unforgivable Blackness: The Rise and Fall of Jack Johnson. HBO led all networks with 20 wins.

== Winners and nominees ==
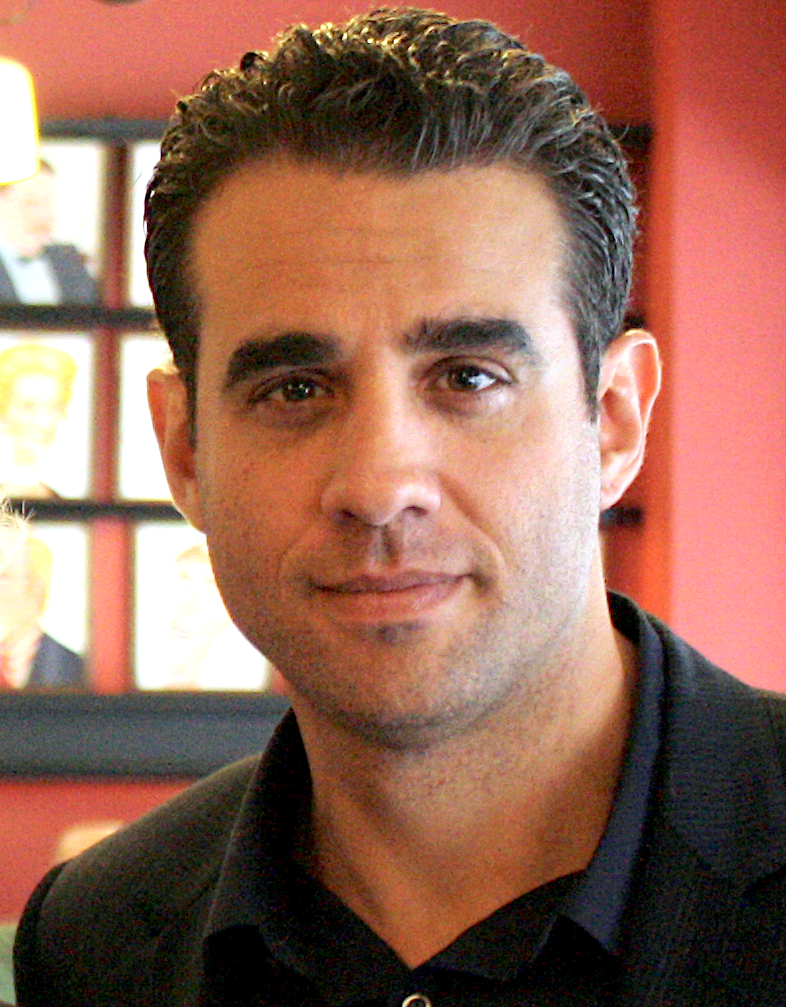
Bobby Cannavale, Outstanding Guest Actor in a Comedy Series winner

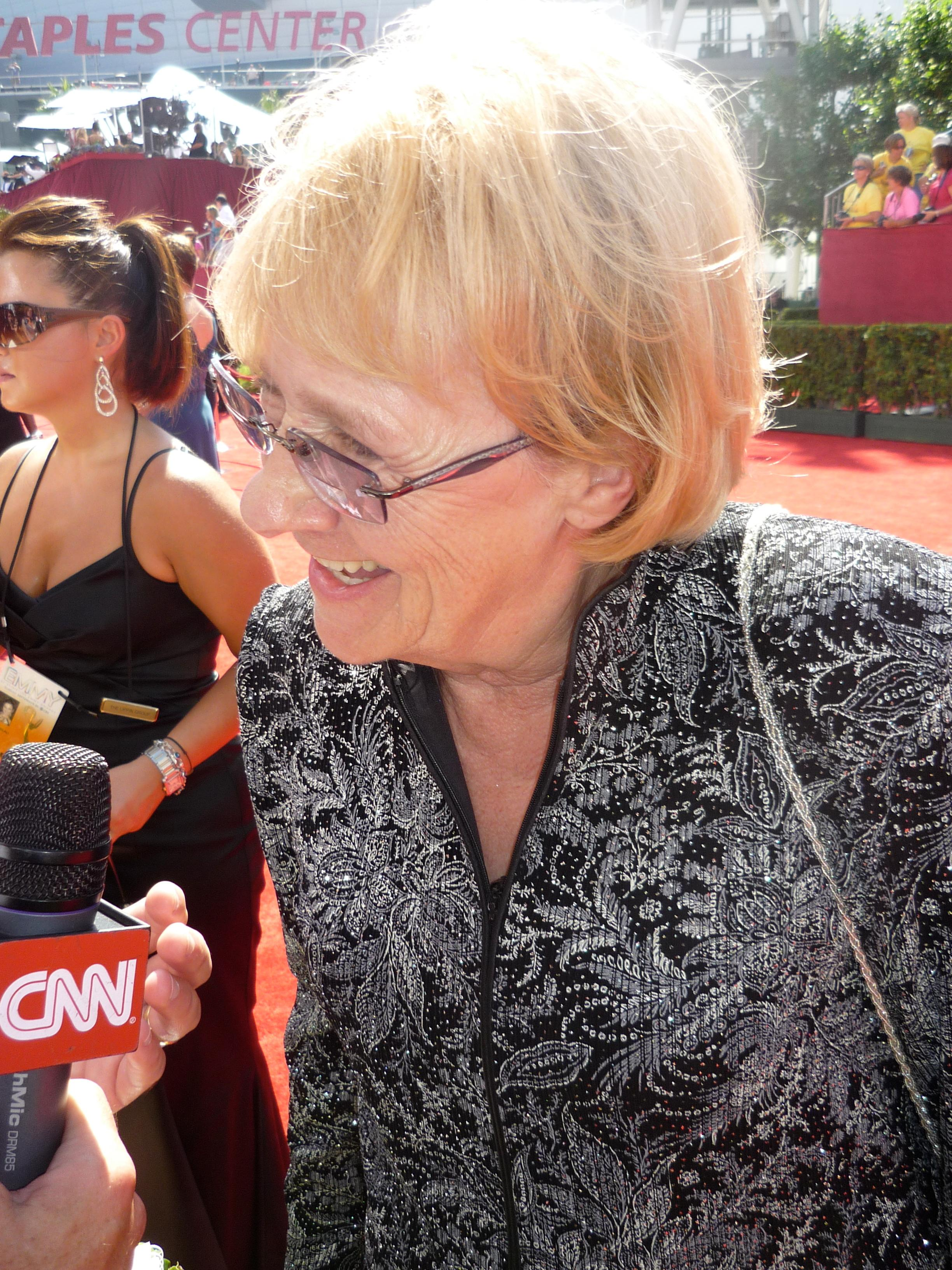
Kathryn Joosten, Outstanding Guest Actress in a Comedy Series winner

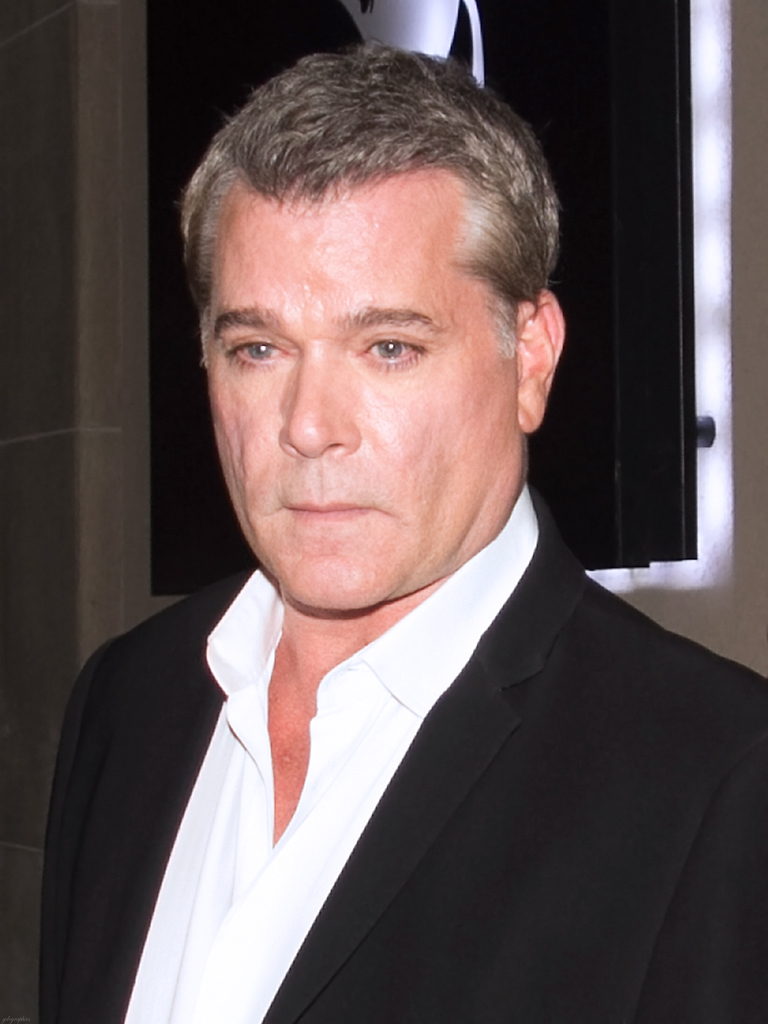
Ray Liotta, Outstanding Guest Actor in a Drama Series winner

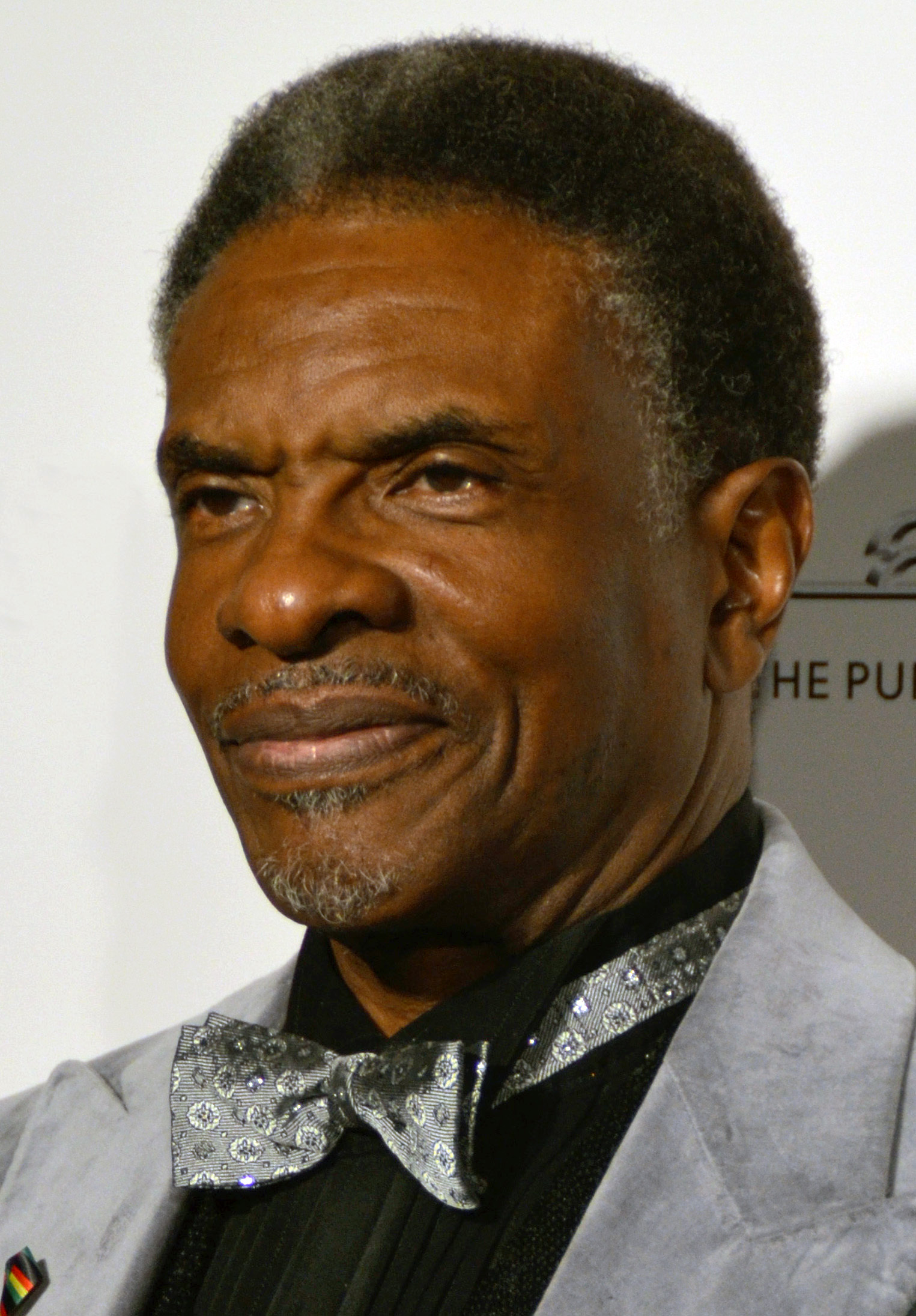
Keith David, Outstanding Voice-Over Performance Winner

Winners are listed first, highlighted in boldface, and indicated with a double dagger (‡). Area awards and juried awards are denoted next to the category names as applicable. (Note: Area awards are non-competitive and nominees are considered on their own terms. Any nominee with at least two-thirds approval received an Emmy. If no nominee received two-thirds approval, the nominee with the highest approval (and a minimum majority approval) received an Emmy.; Juried awards generally do not have nominations; instead, all entrants were screened before members of the appropriate peer group, and one, more than one, or no entry was awarded an Emmy based on the jury's vote.) For simplicity, producers who received nominations for program awards have been omitted.

=== Programs ===
Programs
**Outstanding Variety, Music or Comedy Special**: **58th Annual Tony Awards (2004) (CBS)**‡; 77th Annual Academy Awards (ABC); Dave Chappelle: For What It's Worth (Showtime); Everybody Loves Raymond - The Last Laugh (CBS); The Games of the XXVII Olympiad - Opening Ceremony(NBC)	**Outstanding Special Class Program (Area)**: **Stephen Sondheim's "Passion" (Live From Lincoln Center) (PBS)**; Agatha Christie's Miss Marple (Mystery!) (PBS); Jazz At Lincoln Center Grand Opening Of Frederick P. Rose Hall (PBS); Leonard Bernstein's "Candide" In Concert (Great Performances) (PBS)
**Outstanding Reality Program**: **Extreme Makeover: Home Edition (ABC)**‡; Antiques Roadshow (PBS); Penn & Teller: Bullshit! (Showtime); Project Greenlight (Bravo); Queer Eye for the Straight Guy (Bravo)	**Outstanding Children's Program (Area)**: **Classical Baby (HBO)**‡; **Nick News With Linda Ellerbee: "Never Again? From the Holocaust to the Sudan" (Nickelodeon)**‡; Pride (A&E); That's So Raven (Disney Channel); Zoey 101 (Nickelodeon)
**Outstanding Animated Program (For Programming Less Than One Hour)**: **South Park: "Best Friends Forever" (Comedy Central)**‡; Samurai Jack: "The Four Seasons of Death" (Cartoon Network); Family Guy: "North by North Quahog" (Fox); The Simpsons: "Future-Drama" (Fox); SpongeBob SquarePants: "Fear of a Krabby Patty / Shell of a Man" (Nickelodeon)	**Outstanding Animated Program (For Programming One Hour or More) (Area)**: **Star Wars: Clone Wars: "Vol. 2 (Chapters 21-25)" (Cartoon Network)**‡; Dragons: A Fantasy Made Real (Animal Planet)
**Outstanding Nonfiction Series (Area)**: **Broadway: The American Musical (PBS)**‡; Biography (A&E); Cold Case Files (A&E); Dinner for Five (IFC); Inside the Actors Studio (Bravo)	**Outstanding Nonfiction Special (Area)**: **Unforgivable Blackness: The Rise and Fall of Jack Johnson (PBS)**‡; Beyond The Da Vinci Code (History Channel); Cary Grant: A Class Apart (TCM); Inside the Actors Studio: 10th Anniversary Special (Bravo); Live From New York: The First Five Years of Saturday Night Live (NBC)
**Exceptional Merit in Nonfiction Filmmaking (Juried)**: **Death in Gaza (HBO)**‡; Last Letters Home: Voices of American Troops from the Battlefields of Iraq (HBO); Guerrilla: The Taking Of Patty Hearst (American Experience) (PBS); With All Deliberate Speed (PBS)	**Outstanding Achievement in Interactive Television**: **2005 TV Land Awards All Access Pass (TV Land, Zetools)** (Note: For Outstanding Achievement for Program Specific Enhanced or Interactive Television)‡; **iO Interactive Optimum Digital Cable Service from Cablevision (Cablevision Systems Corporation)** (Note: For Outstanding Achievement for Non-Program Specific Enhanced or Interactive Television for a Channel, Network or Service)‡

=== Performing ===
Performing
**Outstanding Guest Actor in a Comedy Series**: **Bobby Cannavale - Will & Grace as Vince (NBC)**‡; Fred Willard - Everybody Loves Raymond as Hank (CBS); Alec Baldwin - Will & Grace as Malcolm (NBC); Victor Garber - Will & Grace as Peter Bovington (NBC); Jeff Goldblum - Will & Grace as Frank/Scott (NBC)	**Outstanding Guest Actress in a Comedy Series**: **Kathryn Joosten - Desperate Housewives as Mrs. McClusky (ABC)**‡; Lupe Ontiveros - Desperate Housewives as Juanita Solis (ABC); Georgia Engel - Everybody Loves Raymond as Pat (CBS); Cloris Leachman - Malcolm in the Middle as Ida (Fox); Blythe Danner - Will & Grace as Marilyn Truman (NBC)
**Outstanding Guest Actor in a Drama Series**: **Ray Liotta - ER as Charlie Metcalf (NBC)** ‡; Red Buttons - ER as Mr. Rubadoux (NBC); Charles Durning - NCIS as Ernie Yost (CBS); Ossie Davis - The L Word as Melvin Porter (Showtime); Martin Landau - Without a Trace as Frank Malone (CBS)	**Outstanding Guest Actress in a Drama Series**: **Amanda Plummer - Law & Order: Special Victims Unit as Miranda Cole (NBC)**‡; Swoosie Kurtz - Huff as Madeline Sullivan (Showtime); Cloris Leachman - Joan of Arcadia as Aunt Olive (CBS); Angela Lansbury - Law & Order: Special Victims Unit as Eleanor Duvall (NBC); Jill Clayburgh - Nip/Tuck as Bobbie Broderick (FX)
**Outstanding Voice-Over Performance (Juried)**: **Keith David - Unforgivable Blackness: The Rise and Fall of Jack Johnson as Narrator (PBS)**‡

=== Animation ===
Animation
**Outstanding Individual Achievement in Animation (Juried)**
- **Classical Baby: "Bear Hugs" - Barbara Wierzchowska (HBO)**‡
- **Foster's Home for Imaginary Friends: "World Wide Wabbit" - Ed Baker (Cartoon Network)**‡
- **Foster's Home for Imaginary Friends: "House of Bloos" - Craig McCracken (Cartoon Network)**‡
- **Foster's Home for Imaginary Friends: "House of Bloos" - Mike Moon (Cartoon Network)**‡
- **Samurai Jack: "The Four Seasons of Death" - Bryan Andrews (Cartoon Network)**‡
- **Star Wars: Clone Wars: "Vol. 2 (Chapters 21-25)" - Justin K. Thompson (Cartoon Network)**‡
- **The Fairly OddParents: "Shelf Life" - Gordon Hammond (Nickelodeon)**‡
- **The Powerpuff Girls: "West In Pieces" - Frederick J. Gardner III (Cartoon Network)**‡

=== Art Direction ===
Art Direction
**Outstanding Art Direction for a Multi-Camera Series**: **George Lopez: "Leave it to Lopez" / "The Simple Life" / "Trouble in Paradise" - John Shaffner and Judi Giovanni (ABC)**‡; That '70s Show: "Down the Road Apiece" - Garvin Eddy and Tara Stephenson (Fox); Two and a Half Men: "It Was 'Mame' Mom" / "A Low, Guttural Tongue Flapping Noise" - John Shaffner and Ann Shea (CBS); Will & Grace: "The Birds and the Bees" - Glenda Rovello and Melinda Ritz (NBC)	**Outstanding Art Direction for a Single-Camera Series**: **Deadwood: "Requiem for a Gleet" - Ernie Bishop, Maria Caso, James J. Murakami, David Potts (HBO)**‡; Carnivàle: "Old Cherry Blossom Road" - Dan Bishop, Joyce Ann Gilstrap, Roger L. King, David Morong (HBO); Cold Case: "Factory Girls" - Corey Kaplan, Sandy Getzler, Timothy Stepeck (CBS); Desperate Housewives: "Suspicious Minds" - Thomas A. Walsh, P. Erik Carlson, Erica Rogalla (ABC); Six Feet Under: "Grinding the Corn" - Kristan Andrews, Suzuki Ingerslev, Rusty Lipscomb (HBO)
**Outstanding Art Direction for a Miniseries or Movie (Area)**: **The Lost Prince (Masterpiece Theatre) - John-Paul Kelly, Emma MacDevitt, Sara Wan (PBS)**‡; **Warm Springs - Frank Galline, Sarah Knowles, Thomas Minton, Scott Ritenour (HBO)**‡; Empire Falls - John Kasarda, Maria Nay, Stuart Wurtzel (HBO); Faith of My Fathers - Vincent J. Cresciman, Raymond Pumilia (A&E); The Life and Death of Peter Sellers - Norman Garwood, Maggie Gray, Christopher Lowe, John Ralph, Lucy Richardson (HBO)	**Outstanding Art Direction for a Variety, Music Program, or Special**: **The 47th Annual Grammy Awards - Steve Bass, Brian Stonestreet, Scott Wellborn, Tamlyn Wright (CBS)**‡; 77th Academy Awards - Roy Christopher - Stephan G. Olson, Greg Richman (ABC); American Idol: "Top 16 Results" - Andy Walmsley, James Yarnell (Fox); First Invasion: The War of 1812 - H. David Wright (The History Channel); MADtv: "Episode 6" - D Martyn Bookwalter, Daryn Reid Goodall, John Sabato (Fox)

=== Casting ===
Casting
**Outstanding Casting for a Comedy Series**: **Desperate Housewives - Scott Genkinger, Junie Lowry-Johnson (ABC)**‡; Arrested Development - Allison Jones (Fox); Entourage - Sheila Jaffe, Meredith Tucker, Georgianne Walken (HBO); Scrubs - Brett Benner, Debby Romano (NBC); Will & Grace - Tracy Lilienfield	**Outstanding Casting for a Drama Series**: **Lost - Veronica Collins Rooney, Mandy Sherman, April Webster, Alyssa Weisberg (ABC)**‡; 24 - Peggy Kennedy, Debi Manwiller (Fox); Deadwood - Libby Goldstein, Junie Lowry-Johnson (HBO); Grey's Anatomy - John Brace, Linda Lowy (ABC); House - Amy Lippens (Fox); Nip/Tuck - Eric Dawson, Carol Kritzer, Robert J. Ulrich (FX)
**Outstanding Casting for a Miniseries, Movie or a Special**: **Lackawanna Blues - John Papsidera (HBO)**‡; Elvis - Beth Blanks, Steve Brooksbank, Mary Jo Slater (CBS); Empire Falls - Avy Kaufman (HBO); The Life and Death of Peter Sellers - Nina Gold (HBO); Warm Springs - Shay Griffin, Lynn Kressel (HBO)

=== Choreography ===
Choreography
**Outstanding Choreography (Area)**
- **Smucker's Stars On Ice 2005 - Christopher Dean (A&E)**‡
  - 36th NAACP Image Awards - Jeffrey Page, Anthony Talauega, Richmond Talauega (Fox)
  - A Christmas Carol - Dan Siretta (NBC)
  - MADtv: "Episode 23" - Monie Adamson (Fox)
  - Reefer Madness - Mary Ann Kellogg (Showtime

=== Cinematography ===
Cinematography
**Outstanding Cinematography for a Multi-Camera Series**: **Will & Grace: "Friends With Benefits" - Tony Askins (NBC)**‡; Everybody Loves Raymond: "Pat's Secret" - Mike Berlin (CBS); Hope & Faith: "Carmen Get It" - Richard J. Quinlan (ABC); Reba: "Flowers For Van" - Bryan Hays (WB); Two and a Half Men: "Back Off, Mary Poppins" - Steven V. Silver (CBS)	**Outstanding Cinematography for a Single-Camera Series**: **Deadwood: "Complications" - James Glennon (HBO)**‡; 24: "5:00 AM - 6:00 AM" - Rodney Charters (Fox); Carnivàle: "Lincoln Highway" - Jeffrey Jur (HBO); Carnivàle: "The Road to Damascus" - Jim Denault (HBO); Six Feet Under: "Untitled" - Lowell Peterson (HBO)
**Outstanding Cinematography for a Miniseries or Movie**: **The Life and Death of Peter Sellers - Peter Levy (HBO)**‡; Faith of My Fathers - Bill Roe (A&E); The Five People You Meet in Heaven - Kramer Morgenthau (ABC); The 4400 - Thomas Burstyn (USA); Warm Springs - Robbie Greenberg (HBO)	**Outstanding Cinematography for Nonfiction Programming (Single or Multi-Camera)**: **Death in Gaza - James Miller (HBO)**‡; Living With Wolves - Jim Dutcher (Discovery Channel); Survivor: "This Has Never Happened Before" - Michael Applebaum, Derek Carver, Paulo Castillo, David Chapiro, Bennie Cronje, Leighton De Barros, Lee Doig, Justine Evans, Russell Fill, Kevin Garrison, Kent Harvey, Matthias Hoffmann, Mark Hryma, Mark "Ninja" Lynch, Lance Milbrand, Paul Moss, Michael Murray, Dave Parkinson, John Tattersall, Jeff Taylor, Jeff Watt, Peter Wery, Michael Yelseth (CBS); The Amazing Race: "We're Moving Up The Food Chain" - John Armstrong, Sylvester Campe, Tom Cunningham, Chip Goebert, Lucas Kenna Mertes, Per Larsson, Dave Ross, Uri Sharon, Scott Shelley, Mark Walker, Scott Walker (CBS); The Contender: "The Final Four" - Scott Acosta, John Armstrong, Paulo Castillo, Rodney Chauvin, Scott Duncan, Russell Fill, Kevin Garrison, Michael Koepke, Robert Landry, Vince Monteleone, Michael Murray, Martin Palafox, Alan Pierce, Jeremy Schneider, Therese Sherman, Raphael Smadja, Chris S. Smith, John Tattersall, Matt Valentine, Jeff Watt, Mande Whitaker, Tyne M. Whitmore (NBC)

=== Commercial ===
Commercial
**Outstanding Commercial**
- **"Surprise Dinner" - DDB Los Angeles, MJZ (Ameriquest Mortgage)**‡
  - "Applause" - DDB Chicago, PYTKA (Budweiser)
  - "Drink Up" - BBDO New York, Traktor/Partisan (Aquafina)
  - "Glen" - Biscuit Filmworks, Fallon New York (Starbucks DoubleShot)
  - "The One Campaign" - @radical.media (One.org)

=== Costumes ===
Costumes
**Outstanding Costumes for a Series**: **Deadwood: "Boy the Earth Talks To" - Katherine Jane Bryant, Le Dawson (HBO)**‡; Alias: "Tuesday" - Laura Goldsmith, Leslie Herman, Christine Orth (ABC); Carnivàle: "The Road to Damascus" - Chrisi Karvonides-Dushenko, Robin Roberts (HBO); Desperate Housewives: "Suspicious Minds" - Catherine Adair, Karo Vartanian, Joyce Unruh (ABC); Six Feet Under: "Grinding the Corn" - Jill Ohanneson, Bridget Ostersehlte (HBO)	**Outstanding Costumes for a Miniseries, Movie or a Special**: **The Lost Prince (Masterpiece Theatre): "Episode One" - Odile Dicks-Mireaux, Colin May (PBS)**‡; Conquest of America: "The Southwest" - Jeannine Wiest, Phil Wayne (The History Channel); Elvis: "Part 1" - Eduardo Castro, Helen Monaghan (CBS); The Life and Death of Peter Sellers - Jill Taylor, Charlotte Sewell (HBO); Warm Springs - Hope Hanafin, Keith Lewis (HBO)
**Outstanding Costumes for a Variety or Music Program (Juried)**: **MADtv: "Episode 17" - Wendy Benbrook, Wanda Leavey (Fox)**‡

=== Directing ===
Directing
**Outstanding Directing for Nonfiction Programming**
- **Death in Gaza - James Miller (HBO)**‡
  - American Idol: "Finale" - Bruce Gowers (Fox)
  - The Apprentice: "Season 2 Finale" - Glenn Weiss (NBC)
  - Extreme Makeover: Home Edition: "The Dore Family" - Patrick Higgins (ABC)
  - Unforgivable Blackness: The Rise and Fall of Jack Johnson - Ken Burns (PBS)

=== Hairstyling ===
Hairstyling
**Outstanding Hairstyling for a Series**: **Deadwood: "Boy the Earth Talks To" - Carol Pershing, Terry Baliel, Kimberley Spiteri (HBO)**‡; Alias: "Nocturne" - Michael Reitz (ABC); American Dreams: "Starting Over" - Mary Ann Valdes, Norma Lee, Paulette Pennington, Cathrine A. Marcotte (NBC); Carnivàle: "Outside New Canaan" - Norma Lee, Nanci Cascio, Violet Ortiz (HBO); MADtv: "Episode 17 - Matthew Kasten, Anthea Grutsis, Desmond Miller, Raissa Patton (Fox); Star Trek: Enterprise: "In a Mirror, Darkly" - Michael Moore, Roma Goddard, Laura Connolly (UPN)	**Outstanding Hairstyling for a Miniseries, Movie or a Special**: **The Life and Death of Peter Sellers - Enzo Angileri, Veronica Brebner, Ashley Johnson (HBO)**‡; Lackawanna Blues - Charles Gregory Ross, Fay Kelly (HBO); Their Eyes Were Watching God - Alan D'Angerio, Barbara Lorenz (ABC); Tracey Ullman: Live & Exposed - Audrey Futterman-Stern (HBO); Warm Springs - Vanessa Davis, Taylor Knight (HBO)

=== Lighting Direction ===
Lighting Direction
**Outstanding Lighting Direction (Electronic, Multi-Camera) for Variety, Music or Comedy Programming**
- **The Games of the XXVIII Olympiad - Opening Ceremony - Eleftheria Deko, Robert A. Dickinson, Andy O'Reilly, Theodore Tsevas, Ted Wells (NBC)**‡
  - 77th Annual Academy Awards - Bob Barnhart, Robert A. Dickinson, Andy O'Reilly (ABC)
  - American Idol: "Finale, Part 2" - George Harvey, Kieran Healy, Harry Sangmeister (Fox)
  - Eric Clapton Crossroads Guitar Festival (Great Performances) - Stan Crocker (PBS)
  - Late Show with David Letterman: "#2269" - Steven Brill, Tim Stephenson (CBS)

=== Main Title Design ===
Main Title Design
**Outstanding Main Title Design**
- **Huff - Tracy Chandler, Jose Gomez, Christopher Markos, André Stringer (Showtime)**‡
  - Desperate Housewives - Yolanda Santosa, Garson Yu (ABC)
  - House - Dan Brown, Dave Molloy, Matt Mulder, Jake Sargeant (Fox)
  - The Grid - Dan Brown, Shawn Fedorchuk, Paul Matthaeus, Danny Yount (TNT)
  - The Life and Death of Peter Sellers - Paul Donnellon, David Z. Obadiah, John Sunter, Andrew White (HBO)

=== Makeup ===
Makeup
**Outstanding Makeup for a Series (Non-Prosthetic)**: **Deadwood: "A Lie Agreed Upon, Part 1" - John Rizzo, Adam Brandy, Ron Snyder, Deborah McNulty (HBO)**‡; CSI: Crime Scene Investigation: "Ch-Changes" - Melanie Levitt, Matthew W. Mungle, Pamela Phillips, Perri Sorel (CBS); Carnivàle: "Alamogordo, N.M." - Simone Almekias-Siegl, Steve Artmont, Heather Plott (HBO); MADtv: "Episode 4" - Jennifer Aspinall, Nathalie Fratti, Randy Westgate, Scott Wheeler (Fox); Nip/Tuck: "Julia McNamara" - Stephanie Fowler, Eryn Krueger Mekash (FX)	**Outstanding Makeup for a Miniseries, Movie or a Special (Non-Prosthetic)**: **Frankenstein - Beatrix Dollingerova (Hallmark)**‡; Lackawanna Blues - Denise Pugh-Ruiz, Edna M. Sheen, Karen J. Westerfield (HBO); Reefer Madness - Victoria Down, Jo Ann Fowler (Showtime); Revelations: "Part 1" - Richard Snell, Julie Socash, Kandace Westmore (NBC); Warm Springs - Donna Premick, Carla White (HBO)
**Outstanding Prosthetic Makeup for a Series, Miniseries, Movie or a Special (Area)**: **The Life and Death of Peter Sellers - Davy Jones, Wesley Wofford (HBO)**‡; Carnivàle: "Damascus, NE" - Joel Harlow, Rob Hinderstein, Kenny Myers (HBO); MADtv: "Episode 13" - Jennifer Aspinall, Scott Wheeler, Randy Westgate, James Rohland (Fox); Nip/Tuck: "Christian Troy" - Tom Burman, Bari Dreiband-Burman, Stephanie Fowler, Eryn Krueger Mekash, Mary Kay Morse-Witt (FX); Star Trek: Enterprise: "United" - Suzanne Diaz-Westmore, Earl Ellis, Garrett Immel, Jeffrey Lewis, Bradley M. Look, Michael G. Westmore (UPN)

=== Music ===
Music
**Outstanding Music Composition for a Series (Dramatic Underscore)**: **Lost: "Pilot" - Michael Giacchino (ABC)**‡; 24: "2:00 AM - 3:00 AM" - Sean Callery (Fox); Carnivàle: "Lincoln Highway" - Jeff Beal (HBO); House: "Pilot" - Christopher Hoag (Fox); The Simpsons: "Treehouse of Horror XV" - Alf Clausen (Fox)	**Outstanding Music Composition for a Miniseries, Movie or a Special (Original Dramatic Score)**: **Warm Springs - Bruce Broughton (HBO)**‡; Miracle Run - Joseph Conlan (Lifetime Television); Pride - George Fenton (A&E); Revelations: "Part 1" - Joseph Vitarelli (NBC); Salem's Lot - Christopher Gordon (TNT); Sometimes in April - Bruno Coulais (HBO)
**Outstanding Music Direction**: **A Christmas Carol - Michael Kosarin (NBC)**‡; Broadway: The American Musical: "Oh, What a Beautiful Morning" - Matthias Gohl (PBS); Christmas in Washington - Ian Fraser (TNT); Genius: A Night For Ray Charles - Rickey Minor (CBS); The Little Prince (Great Performances) - Rachel Portman (PBS)	**Outstanding Original Music and Lyrics**: **Reefer Madness - "Mary Jane/Mary Lane" by Dan Studney and Kevin Murphy (Showtime)**‡; Malcolm in the Middle: "Dewey's Opera" - "The Marriage Bed" by Charles Sydnor and Eric Kaplan (Fox); The Muppets' Wizard of Oz - "I'm With You" by Michael Giacchino, Jeannie Lurie, Adam Cohen, Debra Frank, and Steve Hayes (ABC); The Simpsons: "A Star Is Torn" - "Always My Dad" by Alf Clausen and Carolyn Omine (Fox); Terror At Home: Domestic Violence in America - "The Tears of the Angels" by Michael Bolton (Lifetime Television)
**Outstanding Original Main Title Theme Music**: **Desperate Housewives - Danny Elfman (ABC)**‡; Foster's Home for Imaginary Friends - James L. Venable (Cartoon Network); Huff - W.G. Snuffy Walden (Showtime); Justice League Unlimited - Michael McCuistion (Cartoon Network); Stargate Atlantis - Joel Goldsmith (Sci Fi)

=== Picture Editing ===
Picture Editing
**Outstanding Single-Camera Picture Editing for a Drama Series**: **Lost: "Pilot" - Mary Jo Markey (ABC)**‡; Deadwood: "A Lie Agreed Upon, Part 1" - Stephen Mark (HBO); 24: "7:00 AM - 8:00 AM" - David Latham (Fox); 24: "6:00 AM - 7:00 AM" - Scott Powell (Fox); 24: "7:00 PM - 8:00 PM" - Chris Willingham (Fox)	**Outstanding Single-Camera Picture Editing for a Comedy Series**: **Desperate Housewives: "Pilot" - Michael Berenbaum (ABC)**‡; Arrested Development: "Mother Boy XXX" - Robert Bramwell (Fox); Arrested Development: "Let 'Em Eat Cake" - Steven Sprung (Fox); Arrested Development: "Good Grief" - Richard Candib (Fox); Desperate Housewives: "Pretty Little Picture" - Jonathan Posell (ABC)
**Outstanding Single-Camera Picture Editing for a Miniseries or a Movie**: **The Life and Death of Peter Sellers - John Smith (HBO)**‡; Back When We Were Grownups (Hallmark Hall of Fame)- Tina Hirsch (CBS); Empire Falls: "Part 2" - Kate Williams (HBO); Faith of My Fathers - Scott Boyd (A&E); The Wool Cap - Paul Dixon (TNT)	**Outstanding Multi-Camera Picture Editing for a Series**: **Scrubs: "My Life in Four Cameras" - John F. Michel (NBC)**‡; Everybody Loves Raymond: "The Faux Pas" - Pat Barnett (CBS); That '70s Show: "Angie" - Michael Karlich (Fox); Two and a Half Men: "It Was Mame, Mom" - Joe Bella (CBS); Will & Grace: "The Newlydreads" - Peter Chakos (NBC)
**Outstanding Picture Editing for a Special (Single or Multi-Camera)**: **Eric Clapton Crossroads Guitar Festival (Great Performances) - Gary Bradley (PBS)**‡; 77th Annual Academy Awards - Chuck Workman, Douglass M. Stewart Jr., Brian Derby, Beth Dewey, Karen Erickson, Scott Kirby, Paul Marengo, Paul Nesmith, Barry A. O'Brien, Kyle Cooper, Kimberly Cooper, Josh Laurence, Tim Carras, Carsten Becker, Shawn Fedorchuk, June Beallor, Maura Corey, Michael J. Shapiro, Carol Streit, Jon Bloom, Martin Apelbaum, David J. Martell, David E. Miller, Michael Polito, Jeff Roe, John Sterneman, Yoram Inon Tal, John Zimmer, Ryan Polito, Tony Cacciarelli, Gus Comegys, Barnaby Levy, Matthew Sharp, John Francis (ABC); Dave Chappelle: For What It's Worth - Jeff U'ren (Showtime); The Games of the XXVIII Olympiad - Opening Ceremony - Jim Bell, Patrice Freymond, Phil Chalmers, Jim O'Farrell (NBC); Tracey Ullman: Live and Exposed - Tammis Chandler (HBO)	**Outstanding Picture Editing for Nonfiction Programming (Single or Multi-Camera)**: **The Amazing Race: "We're Moving Up The Food Chain" - Matt Deitrich, Mike Bolanowski, Heeyeon Chang, Chris Dalzell, Evan Finn, Danny Flynn, Michael "Mighty" Friedman, Eric Goldfarb, Julian Gomez, Andy Kozar, Paul Nielsen, Jacob Parsons, Jeff Runyan, Eric Wilson (CBS)**‡; The Apprentice: "Lights! Camera! Transaction!" - Jonathan Braun, Lane Baker, Peregrine Beckham, Buzz Chatman, David H. Cutler, Glen Ebesu, Andrew Ecker, Steve Escobar, Stephen R. Frederick, Scott Gamzon, Pamela Malouf, David Michael Maurer, Dave Oliver, Jason Pedroza, Dean Permé, Jim Ruxin, Edward Salier, Claire Scanlon, Plowden Schumacher, Chris Simpson, Michael T. Smith, Jason Steinberg, Janet Swanson, Eric Van Wagenen (NBC); The Contender: "The Hangman's Noose" - H.A. Arnarson, Chad Bertalotto, Andrew Bolhuis, Conroy Browne, Willie Castro, Nicholas Don Vito, Sean Foley, Andrew Frank, Julius Ramsay, Rich Remis, J.D. Sievertson, Hudson H. Smith III, Steven Uhlenberg, Eric Van Wagenen (NBC); Survivor: "This Has Never Happened Before" - Tim Atzinger, Tracy Bacenas, Brian Barefoot, Mitchell Danton, Eric Gardner, Michael Greer, David Handman, Frederick Hawthorne, Ricky Kreitman, Ivan Ladizinksy, Robert Matthews, Evan Mediuch, Joubin Mortazavi, James M. Smith, Richard Fox, Jerry U. Frizell (CBS); Survivor: "Culture Shock and Violent Storms" - Tim Atzinger, Tracy Bacenas, Brian Barefoot, Mitchell Danton, Eric Gardner, Michael Greer, David Handman, Frederick Hawthorne, Bryan Horne, Ricky Kreitman, Ivan Ladizinksy, Robert Matthews, Evan Mediuch, Joubin Mortazavi, James M. Smith (CBS)

=== Sound Editing ===
Sound Editing
**Outstanding Sound Editing for a Series**: **24: "12:00 PM - 1:00 PM" - William Dotson, Catherine Speakman, Pembrooke Andrews, Jeff Whitcher, Shawn Kennelly, Jeff Charbonneau, Laura Macias, Vince Nicastro (Fox)**‡; CSI: Crime Scene Investigation: "Down the Drain" - Mace Matiosian, Ruth Adelman, Jivan Tahmizian, David Van Slyke, Todd Nieson, Christine Luethje, Joseph Sabella, Zane Bruce (CBS); CSI: Miami: "Lost Son" - Ann Hadsell, Ruth Adelman, Bradley C. Katona, Todd Niesen, Skye Lewin, Zane Bruce, Joseph Sabella; Lost: "Pilot (Part 1)" - Thomas E. deGorter, Chris Reeves, Gabrielle Reeves, Trevor Jolly, Paul Menichini, Roland Thai, Marc Glassman, Maciek Malish, Troy Allen, Stephen M. Davis, Patrick Cabral, Cynthia Merrill (ABC); Smallville: "Commencement" - Michael E. Lawshe, Stuart Calderon, Tim Cleveland, Paul J. Diller, Adam Johnston, Eric M. Erickson, Karyn Foster, Jessica Dickson, Marc Meyer, David Werntz, Chris McGeary, Casey Crabtree, Michael Crabtree (WB)	**Outstanding Sound Editing for a Miniseries, Movie or a Special**: **The Life and Death of Peter Sellers - Tim Hands, Geoff Rubay, James Mather, Victoria Brazier, Zack Davis, Laura Lovejoy, Anna MacKenzie, Richard Ford, Felicity Cottrell, Ruth Sullivan (HBO)**‡; The Grid: "Part 4" - Mark Friedgen, Devon Curry, Joy Ealy, Bob Costanza, Mike Dickeson, Gary Macheel, Mark Steele, Anton Holden, Charlie Kolander, Bill Bell, Kevin Fisher, Tom Trafalski, Tim Chilton, Jill Sanders (TNT); Hercules - Mark Friedgen, Joy Ealy, Mike Dickeson, Gary Macheel, Bob Costanza, Anton Holden, Allan K. Rosen, Tim Chilton, Jill Sanders (NBC); 3 - Mark Friedgen, Joy Ealy, Kathryn Madsen, Anton Holden, Tim Terusa, Charlie Kolander, Mike Dickeson, Bob Costanza, Gary Macheel, Adriane Marfiak, Rick Steele, Bill Bell, Chris McGeary, Tim Chilton, Jill Sanders (ESPN); Warm Springs - Richard Taylor, David Beadle, Jane Boegle, Russ DeWolf, Andrew Ellerd, Juanita Diana, Sonya Henry, Patrick Hogan, Eileen Horta, Jason Lezama, Stuart Martin, Todd Murakami, Brian Thomas Nist, Robert Arturo Ramirez, Mark Cookson, Ed Kalnins, Jim Bailey, John Benson (HBO)
**Outstanding Sound Editing for Nonfiction Programming (Single or Multi-Camera)**: **Pompeii: The Last Day - Simon Farmer (Discovery Channel)**‡; The Amazing Race: "We're Moving Up The Food Chain" - Matt Deitrich, Mike Bolanowski, Heeyeon Chang, Chris Dalzell, Evan Finn, Danny Flynn, Michael "Mighty" Friedman, Eric Goldfarb, Julian Gomez, Andy Kozar, Paul Nielsen, Jacob Parsons, Jeff Runyan, Eric Wilson (CBS); Broadway: The American Musical: "Syncopated City" - Deborah Wallach, Branka Mrkic-Tana (PBS); Star Wars: Empire of Dreams - Troy Bogert, David Comtois, Scott B. Morgan, Molly Shock (A&E); Unforgivable Blackness: The Rise and Fall of Jack Johnson: "Episode 1" - Sean Huff, Erik Ewers, Jacob Ribicoff (PBS)

=== Sound Mixing ===
Sound Mixing
**Outstanding Single-Camera Sound Mixing for a Series**: **24: "6:00 AM - 7:00 AM" - Bill Gocke, Michael Olman, Kenneth Kobett (Fox)**‡; CSI: Crime Scene Investigation: "Down the Drain" - Mick Fowler, Yuri Reese, Bill Smith (CBS); Deadwood: "A Lie Agreed Upon, Part 1" - Geoffrey Patterson, R. Russell Smith, William Freesh (HBO); Lost: "Outlaws" - Michael Moore, Scott Weber, Frank Morrone (ABC); The West Wing: "2162 Votes" - Patrick Hanson, Gary D. Rogers, Dan Hiland (NBC)	**Outstanding Single-Camera Sound Mixing for a Miniseries or a Movie**: **Warm Springs - Mary Ellis, Rick Ash, Adam Jenkins (HBO)**‡; Faith of My Fathers - Richard Schexnayder, Mark Linden, Tara Paul, Liam Lockhart, Harry Snodgrass (A&E); Lackawanna Blues - Susumu Tokunow, Rick Ash, Adam Jenkins (HBO); The Life and Death of Peter Sellers - Simon Kaye, Rick Ash, Adam Jenkins; The Wool Cap - Claude Lahaye, Terry O'Bright, Robert L. Harman (TNT)
**Outstanding Multi-Camera Sound Mixing for a Series or Special**: **Two and a Half Men: "Can You Eat Human Flesh with Wooden Teeth?" - Bruce Peters, Kathy Oldham, Robert LaMasney, Charlie McDaniel (CBS)**‡; Everybody Loves Raymond: "Boys' Therapy" - Brentley Walton, Kathy Oldham, John Bickelhaupt (CBS); That '70s Show: "Angie" - Vince Rohr, Charlie McDaniel, Craig Porter (Fox); Will & Grace: "Friends with Benefits"/"Kiss and Tell" - Peter Damski, Kathy Oldham, Craig Porter (NBC)	**Outstanding Sound Mixing for a Variety or Music Series or Special or Animation (Area)**: **Genius: A Night for Ray Charles - Evan Adelman, Paul Sandweiss, Randy Faustino, Robert LaMasney (CBS)**‡; 77th Annual Academy Awards - Edward J. Greene, Tom Vicari, Robert Douglass, Patrick Baltzell, Jim Corbett, Bruce R. Buehlman (ABC); American Idol: "Finale" - Chris Maddalone, Andrew Fletcher, Brian Riordan, Boyd Wheeler (Fox); Eric Clapton Crossroads Guitar Festival (Great Performances) - Elliot Scheiner, Mick Guzauski, Ed Cherney, Neil Dorfsman, Susan Pelino (PBS); The 47th Annual Grammy Awards - Edward J. Greene, Paul Sandweiss, John Harris, Jay Vicari, Don Warsham, Mikael Stewart, Ron Reaves, Klaus Landsberg, Robert LaMasney (CBS)
**Outstanding Sound Mixing for Nonfiction Programming (Single or Multi-Camera)**: **Broadway: The American Musical: "Oh, What A Beautiful Mornin'" - Ed Campbell (PBS)**‡; The Amazing Race: "We're Moving Up the Food Chain" - Jim Ursulak, Heron De Alencar, Gary Azzinaro, Kris Bagley, Tyler Bender, Stephen Crawley, Dean Gaveau, Brian Johnson, Peter Jones, Will Minchin, Gustavo Gama Rodrigues, Barry Weissman, Troy Smith (CBS); America's Deadliest Season: Alaskan Crab Fishing - Bob Bronow (Discovery Channel); American Idol: "Washington D.C. Auditions" / "St. Louis, Missouri Auditions" - Brian Riordan (Fox); Survivor: "Love Is in the Air, Rats Are Everywhere" - Jeremy Ireland, Christina Chin, Tony Jensen, Robert Mackay, Terry Meehan, Chris Kelly, Molefi J. Chabane, Dan Foster, Michael Ormsby, Steve Guercio, Scott Hanlon, Michael St. Hilaire, Colette Stewart, Jonathan Andrews, Drew Levinson, Terrance Dwyer (CBS)

=== Special Visual Effects ===
Special Visual Effects
**Outstanding Special Visual Effects for a Series**: **Lost: "Pilot (Part 1 & Part 2)" - Kevin Blank, Mitch Suskin, Archie Ahuna, Jonathan Spencer Levy, Benoit "Ben" Girard, Laurent M. Abecassis, Kevin Kutchaver, Steve Fong, Bob Lloyd (ABC)**‡; Battlestar Galactica: "33" - Gary Hutzel, Patricia Gannon, Lee Stringer, Matt Gore, Michael Gibson, Mark Shimer, Adam "Mojo" Lebowitz, Dustin Adair, Gabriel Köerner (Sci Fi); Battlestar Galactica: "The Hand of God" - Gary Hutzel, Mike Gibson, Kirsten Meekison, Tom Archer, Brenda Campbell, Andrew Karr, Daniel Osaki, Adrian Van der Park, Jeremy Hoey (Sci Fi); Stargate Atlantis: "Rising" - Michelle Comens, John Gajdecki, Bruce Woloshyn, Jinnie Pak, Dan Mayer, Wes Sargent, Jose Burgos, Debora Dunphy, Chris Doll (Sci Fi); Stargate SG-1: Reckoning (Part 2) - Michelle Comens, James Rorick, Karen Watson, Krista McLean, Craig Van Den Biggelaar, Adam de Bosch Kemper, Brett Keyes, James Tichenor, Ryan Jensen (Sci Fi)	**Outstanding Special Visual Effects for a Miniseries, Movie or a Special**: **The Life and Death of Peter Sellers - Joe Pavlo, Barrie Hemsley, Paul Tuersley, Andy MacLeod, Andrew Fowler, Camille Cellucci, Mark Intravartolo, Robin Huffer, Neil Culley (HBO)**‡; Dragons: A Fantasy Made Real - Sirio Quintavalle, Alec Knox, Neil Glasbey, Sarah Tosh, Daren Horley, Catherine Mullan, Laurent Benhamo, Dan Lavender, Christian Manz (Animal Planet); Farscape: The Peacekeeper Wars: "Night Two" - Benita Carey, Lynne Cartwright, Jeremy Howdin, Brett Margules, Dominic Bean, Rob Nicol, David Booth, Steve Anderson, Mike Seymour (Sci Fi); Legend of Earthsea - Eric Grenaudier, Jared Jones, Sam Nicholson, Earl Lawrence Paraszczynec, Lee Wilson, Sebastien Bergeron, Asa Svedberg, Lisa Sepp-Wilson, Jean Lapointe (Sci Fi); Supervolcano - Tim Zaccheo, Mark Richardson, Grahame Andrew, Abbie Tucker-Williams, Max Wright, Rob Harvey, John-Paul Harney (Discovery Channel)

=== Stunt Coordination ===
Stunt Coordination
**Outstanding Stunt Coordination**
- **24: "12:00 PM - 1:00 PM" - Matt Taylor (Fox)**‡
  - Alias: "The Awful Truth" - Jeff Habberstad (ABC)
  - ER: "The Show Must Go On" - Cort L. Hessler III (NBC)
  - The Last Ride - Artie Malesci (USA)
  - Star Trek: Enterprise: "Borderland" - Vince Deadrick Jr. (UPN)

=== Technical Direction ===
Technical Direction
**Outstanding Technical Direction, Camerawork, Video for a Series**: **Late Show with David Letterman: "Show #2269" - Timothy Kennedy, Al Cialino, David Dorsett, Karin-Lucie Grzella, Jack Young, John Hannel, John Curtin, George Rothweiler, Dan Flaherty, Fred Shimizu, Steve Kaufman, Joe Debonis, Claus Stuhlweissenburg, John Pry, Wiliam White, Dan Campbell (CBS)**‡; Late Night with Conan O'Brien: "Episode #2014" - Gregory Aull, Richard S. Carter, Kenneth Decker, Kurt Decker, Eugene Huelsman, Chris Matott, James Palczewski, Carl M. Henry III (NBC); Saturday Night Live: "Host-Jason Bateman & Musical Guest-Kelly Clarkson" - Steven Cimino, John Pinto, Richard B. Fox, Brian Phraner, Michael Bennett, Eric A. Eisenstein, Susan Noll, Frank Grisanti (NBC)	**Outstanding Technical Direction, Camerawork, Video for a Miniseries, Movie or a Special**: **The Games of the XXVIII Olympiad - Opening Ceremony - Steve Laxton, Dean Andersen, Dave Adkins, Bob Basile, Cody Alexander, Dan Beard, Andy Allman, Joe Carzoli, Steve Cozakos, Robert Jaeger, Joe Debonis, Richard Leible Jr., Rick Fox Jr., James Mansfield, Mike Harvath, David Manton, Terry Hester, Brian Phraner, Andy Italiano, John Pinto, Rick Rice, David Whitlock, Pat Rondou, Mike Wemberly, Marc Tippy, Ken Woo, Nick Utley, James Wachter, Harry Weisman, Jerrod Hochman (NBC)**‡; 77th Annual Academy Awards - John B. Field, Rick Edwards, Ervin Hurd, Allan Wells, Ted Ashton, Rob Balton, John Burdick, Rocky Danielson, Dave Eastwood, Tom Green, Hank Geving, Marc Hunter, Charlie Huntley, Dave Levisohn, Jay Millard, Lyn Noland, Rob Palmer, Bill Philbin, David Plakos, Hector Ramirez, Brian Reason, Mark Whitman, Kris Wilson, Jean Mason, Mark Sanford, Keith Winikoff (ABC); ''Eric Clapton Crossroads Guitar Festival (Great Performances) - Keith Winikoff, Miguel Armstrong, Timm Bland, Barbara Drago, Freddy Frederick, Ed Fussell, Pat Gleason, Manny Gutierrez, Ray Hoover, Lyn Noland, Chad Smith, Ron Smith, William (Billy) Steinberg, Matty Randazzo (PBS); Tsunami Aid: A Concert of Hope - Keith Winikoff, Ted Ashton, Joe Bohman, Marc Hunter, Charlie Huntley, Garrett Hurt, Dave Levisohn, Lyn Noland, Ken Patterson, John Repczynski, Mark Whitman, Damien Tuffereau, Mark Sanford, Chuck Reilly (NBC); 2004 Video Music Awards - Eric Becker, John Atkinson, Rob Balton, Marc Bloomgarden, Danny Bonilla, John Burdick, Dave Eastwood, Warren Forman, Freddy Frederick, Tom Hildreth, Charlie Huntley, Jay Kulick, John Meiklejohn, Jeff Mydock, Lyn Noland, Rob Palmer, Brian Reason, Jofre Rosero, Damien Tuffereau, Ron Washburn, Mark Whitman, Kris Wilson, William (Billy) Steinberg (MTV)

=== Writing ===
Writing
**Outstanding Writing for Nonfiction Programming**
- **Unforgivable Blackness: The Rise and Fall of Jack Johnson - Geoffrey C. Ward (PBS)**‡
  - Beyond The Da Vinci Code - Thomas Quinn, Rob Blumenstein (The History Channel)
  - Broadway: The American Musical: "Oh, What a Beautiful Morning" - JoAnn Young (PBS)
  - Death in Gaza - Saira Shah (HBO)
  - Penn & Teller: Bullshit!: "Profanity" - Penn Jillette, Teller, Jon Hotchkiss, Star Price, Michael Goudeau (Showtime)
