= Nicole Parker =

American actress and comedian

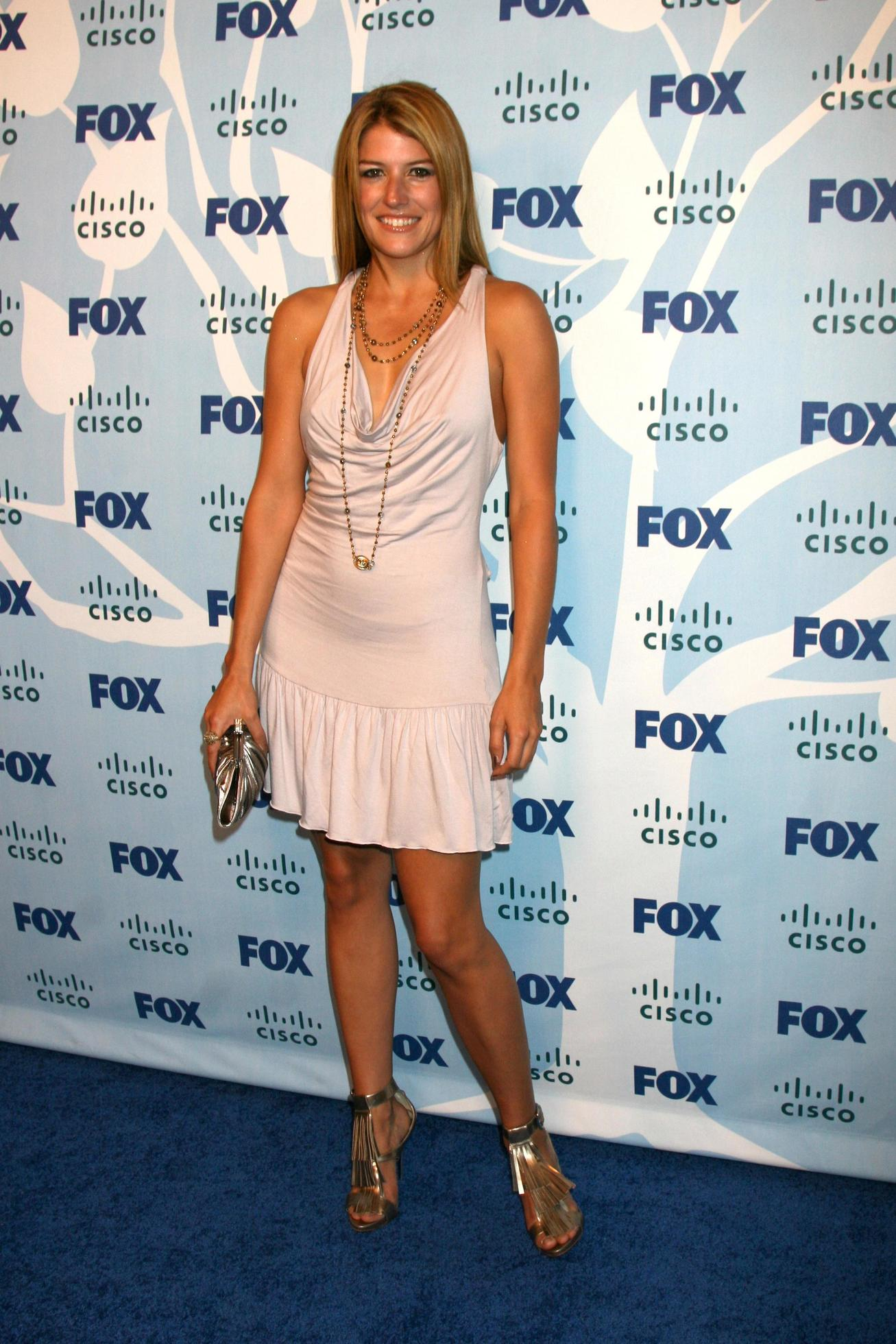
- Parker in September 2008
- Occupations: Actress; comedian
- Years active: 2003–present
- Children: 1

Nicole Parker is an American actress and comedian. She is best known for her work on Fox's sketch comedy show Mad TV (2003–2009, 2016), for which she was a regular cast member. In 2009, Parker played Elphaba in the Broadway production of Wicked, a role that she reprised on tour across North America. She voiced Penelope Pitstop in the animated series Wacky Races (2017–2019) and has appeared in the parody films Meet the Spartans and Disaster Movie (both 2008). Parker currently co-hosts the Comedy Bang! Bang! World podcast The Neighborhood Listen, along with comedian Paul F. Tompkins.

== Career ==
=== Mad TV ===
In 2003, Parker joined the Season 9 cast of Mad TV. She was a featured performer, until Season 10, when she was promoted to cast member. Parker left the show on March 28, 2009, but appeared in sketches until the series finale in 2009.

Parker's most notable characters include Pat-Beth LaMontrose and the Disney Girl. She also had impersonated celebrities, mostly singers such as Britney Spears, Ashlee and Jessica Simpson, Julie Andrews, James Blunt, and Judy Garland.

=== Theatre ===
In 2004, Parker was nominated for a Jeff Award for her performance in The People vs. Friar Laurence, The Man Who Killed Romeo and Juliet.

From July 2006 to January 2007, Parker performed in the comedy musical Martin Short: Fame Becomes Me.

In 2009, Parker replaced Marcie Dodd in the role of Elphaba in the Broadway production of the musical Wicked, from January 16. She starred opposite Alli Mauzey as Glinda.

Parker starred in the new musical The People in the Picture, which began performances at Studio 54 on April 1, 2011 and officially opened on April 28, 2011.

Parker again starred as Elphaba in Wicked on the show's first North American tour. She reunited with Mauzey beginning performances in Denver, Colorado May 18, 2012. She replaced Mamie Parris. She later left the production on September 24, 2012. In 2024, Parker played Ursula in The Muny production of The Little Mermaid, as well as Marie Dindon in the Pasadena Playhouse production of La Cage aux Folles.

=== The Groundlings ===
Parker frequently guest performs in the improvisational comedy show Cookin' with Gas at The Groundlings Theatre in Hollywood, California.

=== Madtv musical ===
In 2017, Parker was involved with the development of a Madtv musical called The Mad Show that received a developmental production from Colorado's Theatre Aspen and was featured in presentations at the Wheeler Opera House from September 12 to 16, 2017. The show starred Madtv alumni like Parker and Lauren Pritchard.

== Filmography ==
=== Film roles ===
Year	Title	Role	Notes
2007	Four Years	Stacy	
2008	Disaster Movie	Enchanted Princess, Jessica Simpson and Amy Winehouse	
2008	Meet the Spartans	Britney Spears, Paula Abdul, Paris Hilton and Ellen DeGeneres	
2008	Proposition 8: The Musical	California Gays and The People That Love Them	Short film
2009	Funny People	Dawn	
2009	Weathered	Weather Wellington	Short film
2012	Sitting Babies	Keri	Short film

=== Television roles ===
Year(s)	Title	Role	Notes
2003–2009, 2016	Mad TV	Various characters	113 episodes
2004–2008	Higglytown Heroes	Window Washer Hero (voice)	1 episode
2005	Kathy Griffin: My Life on the D-List	Herself	1 episode
2012	Bunk	Herself	2 episodes
2012	Trust Us with Your Life	Herself	1 episode
2013	Key & Peele	Fantine	1 episode
2013	Mad	Various voices	2 episodes
2014	It Could Be Worse	Super Fan	1 episode
2014	Hot in Cleveland	Jessica	1 episode
2017	Bajillion Dollar Propertie$	Gwentolyn Swanson	2 episodes
2017–2018	Bunnicula	Siobhan (voice)	2 episodes
2017–2019	Wacky Races	Penelope Pitstop / Pandora Pitstop (voice)	Regular
2020	Let's Be Real	(voice)	1 episode

== Theatre ==
Year	Title	Role	Notes
2003	Fuenteovejuna	Laurencia	Musical (Regional)
2003	Stuck	Director	Improv play (regional)
2004	The Magic Flute	Pamina	Musical (regional)
2004	The People vs. Friar Laurence, The Man Who Killed Romeo and Juliet	Juliet	Musical (regional)
2006–2007	Martin Short: Fame Becomes Me	Various characters	Comedy musical (Broadway)
2007–2008	Suitcase Full of Lies	Jillane Jenkins	Comedy musical (regional)
2009	Wicked	Elphaba	Musical (Broadway)
2010	Suitcase Full of Lies	Jillane Jenkins	Comedy musical (regional)
2010	How to Succeed in Business Without Really Trying	Rosemary	Musical (limited engagement)
2011	The People in the Picture	Red	Musical (Broadway)
2012	Wicked	Elphaba	Musical (1st North American tour)
2013	Funny Girl	Fanny Brice	Musical (regional)
2014	Dog & Pony	Mags	Musical (regional)
2015	These Paper Bullets	Bea	Comedy musical (off-Broadway)
2017	The Man in the Ceiling	Mother	Musical (regional)
2023	Titanique	Celine Dion	Comedy musical (off-Broadway)
2024	The Little Mermaid	Ursula	Musical (regional)
2024	La Cage aux Folles	Marie Dindon/Mme. Renaud	Musical (regional)

== Awards and nominations ==
Year	Award	Category	Nominated work	Result
2004	Jeff Award	Best Actress in a Principal Role	The People vs. Friar Laurence, The Man Who Killed Romeo and Juliet	Nominated
2009	GLAAD Media Awards	Special Recognition	Prop 8: The Musical	Won
2009	Damah Film Festival	Best Actress (Audience Award)	Short film, Weathered	Won
