= Mad TV season 9 =

Season of television series

Mad TV
- Season 9
- No. of episodes: 25

Release
- Original network: Fox
- Original release: September 13, 2003 – May 22, 2004

Season chronology
- ← Previous; Season 8 Next → Season 10

The ninth season of Mad TV, an American sketch comedy series, originally aired in the United States on the Fox Network between September 13, 2003, and May 22, 2004.

== Summary ==
Similar to its rival show, Saturday Night Live, this season saw a considerable shake-up in the cast and much hiring and promotion to fill the void. Longtime cast member and last member of the original 1995–1996 cast, Debra Wilson, left the show, leaving this cast as the first with no one from the first season. Ike Barinholtz, Josh Meyers, Ron Pederson, and Paul Vogt were upgraded to repertory status, while Simon Helberg and Christina Moore were let go. New cast members hired this season include: Daniele Gaither, a member of The Groundlings who was trained by cast member Michael McDonald, a former cast member of the short-lived WB sketch show Hype, and an extra on an early episode of MADtv in a blaxploitation parody about Bob Dole; Nicole Parker (who also appeared in a past episode of MADtv as an extra. Parker appeared in the music video parody of The Calling's "Wherever You Will Go" as the woman getting tattoos on her arm of The Calling's, Creed's, Pearl Jam's, and Ray Charles' names); Keegan-Michael Key and Jordan Peele (who were originally hired because FOX was on the fence about whether to hire them both or pick one over the other. After seeing their comedic chemistry and ability to generate hilarious celebrity impressions and original characters, FOX decided to keep Key and Peele on the show); Melissa Paull, and Gillian Vigman.

Season nine is home to the show's 200th episode, featuring appearances from former cast members Orlando Jones, Nicole Sullivan, Alex Borstein, Will Sasso, Artie Lange, and Phil LaMarr. Other guests this season include Jessica Alba, Tommy Davidson, Fred Willard, Gregory Helms, Trish Stratus, Tony Hawk, Jeff Probst, Cedric the Entertainer, Frankie Muniz, Tom Bergeron, and Jennifer Coolidge.

This is the last season for Mo Collins and Josh Meyers, and the only season for Melissa Paull and Gillian Vigman.

== Opening montage ==
The title sequence begins with the Mad TV logo appearing above the Los Angeles skyline. The theme song, performed by the hip-hop group Heavy D & the Boyz, begins and each repertory cast member is introduced alphabetically, followed by the featured cast. The screen dissolves into three live-action clips of an individual cast member. The three screens multiply until they occupy the entire screen. A still photo of the cast member appears on the screen with a caption of his/her name superimposed on it. When all cast members and guests are introduced, the music stops and the title sequence ends with the phrase "You are now watching Mad TV".

== Cast ==
Repertory cast members

- Ike Barinholtz (22/25 episodes)
- Frank Caliendo (20/25 episodes)
- Mo Collins (14/25 episodes; last episode: May 15, 2004)
- Bobby Lee (21/25 episodes)
- Michael McDonald (22/25 episodes)
- Josh Meyers (23/25 episodes)
- Ron Pederson (23/25 episodes)
- Aries Spears (22/25 episodes)
- Paul Vogt (24/25 episodes)
- Stephnie Weir (25/25 episodes)

Featured cast members

- Daniele Gaither (19/25 episodes)
- Keegan-Michael Key (9/25 episodes; first episode: February 7, 2004)
- Nicole Parker (19/25 episodes; first episode: November 1, 2003)
- Melissa Paull (4/25 episodes; first episode: December 20, 2003/last episode: February 14, 2004)
- Jordan Peele (14/25 episodes; first episode: November 15, 2003)
- Gillian Vigman (14/25 episodes; last episode: May 15, 2004)

== Writers ==
- Bryan Adams (eps. 1–25)
- Ike Barinholtz (eps. 4, 19)
- Dick Blasucci (eps. 1–25)
- Alex Borstein (ep. 6)
- Chris Cluess (eps. 1–25)
- Steven Cragg (eps. 1–25)
- John Crane (eps. 1–25)
- Lauren Dombrowski (eps. 1–25)
- Michael Hitchcock (eps. 1–25)
- Jennifer Joyce (eps. 1–25)
- Scott King (writing supervisor) (eps. 1–25)
- Jason Kordelos (eps. 1–25)
- Michael Loprete (ep. 5)
- Brooks McBeth (eps. 1–25)
- Bruce McCoy (eps. 2–25)
- Michael McDonald (eps. 1, 3, 4, 6, 7, 13, 16, 21, 23, 25)
- Josh Meyers (eps. 4, 19)
- Rick Najera (eps. 1–25)
- Tami Sagher (eps. 1–25)
- David Salzman (eps. 1–25)
- Rich Talarico (eps. 1–25)
- Stephnie Weir (eps. 1, 5, 12, 13, 15, 16, 18, 21, 22)
- Maiya Williams (eps. 1–25)
- Jim Wise (eps. 1–25)

== Episodes ==
No. overall	No. in season	Title	Guest(s)	Original release date
197	1	"Episode 1"	Andy Dick, Mýa	September 13, 2003
50 Cent (Spears) raps about 2003's lackluster summer blockbuster films and sequels in a parody of "P.I.M.P"; Al Michaels (Caliendo) and John Madden (Caliendo) start the season by introducing Mad TV's newest mascot, Frostbite the Penguin, who gets into a fight with Andy Dick at the premiere; Madonna (Collins) and Missy Elliott (Spears) promote their new line of GAP clothing; ABC promotes their newest series, "Fake TV"; Marvin Tikvah (McDonald) hopes to sign two girls (Gaither, Weir); Connie Chung (Lee) hosts a live taping of the California Governors Debate; Rod Roddy (Caliendo) gets divorced by his wife (Collins) at a restaurant; Dot (Weir) is a guest on a Mr. Wizard-type children show; Matthew the Bible Dude (McDonald) fights the sin of online music piracy in a high school football locker room; Andy Dick gets into an argument with Michael McDonald. Mýa performs "My Love Is Like...Wo". Featuring: Daniele Gaither, Gillian Vigman Notes: Daniele Gaither and Gillian Vigman's first episode as featured cast members.
198	2	"Episode 2"	Phil LaMarr	September 20, 2003
Parody of Joe Boxer commercials has references to black slavery; Lorraine (Collins) tours Venice Beach; Shaq (Spears) introduces a cartoon called Shaq and The Super Lakers; a father (Meyers) takes his insecure son (Pederson) to Dr. Kylie's (Weir) office; parody of Jewel's (Collins) "Intuition" has the singer forced to be the next over-sexualized pop singer à la Britney Spears and Christina Aguilera; Phil LaMarr guest stars on a special Emmy edition of Real Motherf****** Talk; senior citizens, Clifford (Pederson) and Muriel (Weir), deliver the 7 A.M. Condo Report; Ike Barinholtz and Aries Spears interview celebrities at premiere for The Fighting Temptations. Featuring: Daniele Gaither Absent: Frank Caliendo, Bobby Lee, Gillian Vigman
199	3	"Episode 3"	Don Cheadle	September 27, 2003
Parody of Olive Garden commercial has mediocre Italian cuisine and loud, drunken families (Barinholtz, Collins, Gaither, Pederson, Vigman, Vogt); James Getzlaff (Meyers) and Andra Stasko (McDonald) return for a new installment of Boy Meets Boy; a parody of Matchbox Twenty's "Unwell" centers on Kobe Bryant's (Spears) rape case; floor manager Sean Gidcomb (McDonald) harasses "sneaky snakes" (Meyers, Pederson, Weir) and gets in accidents; QVC hostesses (Vigman, Weir) insult plus-sized models (Collins, Gaither); guest star Don Cheadle plays a counselor who solves marital problems with a three-way; Mo Collins and Paul Vogt conduct red-carpet interviews at the Emmys; the Aflac duck (voice of Vogt) overhears two office employees (Gaither, Meyers) talk about Ben Affleck's divorce with Jennifer Lopez. Featuring: Daniele Gaither, Gillian Vigman Absent: Bobby Lee
200	4	"Episode 4"	Tony Hawk, Chingy	October 4, 2003
Wade Boggs (Barinholtz) promotes Oldsmobile cars; a parody of Celebrities Uncensored has paparazzi (Pederson) goad celebrities (Barinholtz, Caliendo, Meyers, Vigman, Vogt) into beating them up for the cameras; Michael Jackson (Spears) gets his house and himself remade by the Queer Eye for the Straight Guy cast (Barinholtz, Lee, Meyers, Pederson, Vogt); Bill O'Reilly (McDonald) welcomes Gray Davis (McDonald) to The O'Reilly Factor; Freddy vs. Jason and Snuggle commercials merge into a parody; Stuart Larkin (McDonald) sees a therapist (Pederson); Tony Hawk guest stars in a sketch as the owner of a sports-themed restaurant; Leona Campbell (Weir) chats with the wife (Vigman) of a bungee jumping accident victim; Hitprov with Ike Barinholtz and Josh Meyers; Chingy performs "Right Thurr". Featuring: Gillian Vigman Absent: Daniele Gaither
201	5	"Episode 5"	Jessica Alba	November 1, 2003
Hideki (Lee) goes from Average Asian to Angry Asian; John Madden (Caliendo) offers to promote Vagisil; Angela (Weir), her cousin Natalie (Vogt), and her brother Billy (Meyers) try to submit a video to America's Funniest Home Videos; SuChin Pak (Lee) fears for her life when interviewing rapper and bullet magnet 50 Cent (Spears); a law agency helps out couples (Collins, McDonald) who fight; Jessica Alba plays Jessica Simpson in a parody of Newlyweds: Nick and Jessica; Chris Martin (McDonald) wreaks havoc while walking backwards in a music video parody of Coldplay's "The Scientist"; two macho guys (Barinholtz, Meyers) question their sexuality during a football game; Clifford (Pederson) and Muriel (Weir) host another 7 A.M. Condo Report; a parody of The Powerpuff Girls has starlets Tara Reid (voice of Parker), Brittany Murphy (voice of Gaither), and Paris Hilton (voice of Collins) as superheroines; Ike Barinholtz and Aries Spears interview celebrities at the premiere for The Matrix Revolutions; Bobby Lee gets mistaken for a female prostitute by the police outside the studio. Featuring: Daniele Gaither, Nicole Parker Absent: Gillian Vigman Notes: Nicole Parker's first episode as a featured cast member.
202	6	"Episode 6"	Orlando Jones, Artie Lange, Nicole Sullivan, Alex Borstein, Will Sasso, Tommy Davidson	November 8, 2003
A music video parody of OutKast's "Hey Ya!" commemorates Mad TVs 200th episode; Nicole Sullivan reprises her role as The Vancome Lady, who befriends Lorraine Swanson (Collins) in a parody of The Bachelorette; Kenny Rogers (Sasso) hosts his own variation of Punk'd; Artie Lange records a toast to Mad TV; Stuart Larkin (McDonald) buys new shoes; Judith (Sullivan) and Clyde (McDonald) make jokes about Dennis Rodman and Michael McDonald; Miss Swan (Borstein) gets her driver's license reinstated; Karen Goddard (Borstein) is reunited with her family (Collins, McDonald, Weir) after returning from space; Bill Clinton (Sasso) and Tommy Davidson are guests on Real Mother***king Talk. Featuring: Daniele Gaither Absent: Nicole Parker, Gillian Vigman
203	7	"Episode 7"	David Arquette	November 15, 2003
A parody of "Me Against the Music" has Britney Spears (Parker) on the run from a vampiric, desperate Madonna (Collins); Bae Sung (Lee) is a translator for a North Korean ambassador (Ken Jeong); Sean Gidcomb (McDonald) is thrown a surprise party; David Arquette plays one of the contestants on Wheel of Fortune that drives Pat Sajak (Meyers) crazy; Lily Hubsher (Weir) pretends she's a werewolf to renew her credit card; Trina (Collins) tries to get a dance partner at a costume ball; a terrorist (Barinholtz) becomes too well-adjusted to life in America to join his sleeper cell partner (Meyers) in destroying it; Ike Barinholtz and Ron Pederson interview celebrities at the premiere for The Cat in the Hat. Featuring: Nicole Parker, Jordan Peele Absent: Frank Caliendo, Daniele Gaither, Aries Spears, Gillian Vigman Notes: Jordan Peele's first episode as a featured cast member.
204	8	"Episode 8"	Tom Bergeron, Kathy Griffin	November 22, 2003
To keep Everybody Loves Raymond going, CBS decides that Ray Barone's lesbian cousin (Caliendo) is now the star of the show; TRL premieres a video from profane rapper Emcee Escher (Spears); Connie Chung (Lee) interviews Paige Davis (Collins); Mike Tyson (Spears) guest stars on Shaq and The Super Lakers; during a football game, a Jumbotron marriage proposal goes awry; Tom Bergeron hosts a special edition of Hollywood Squares featuring the stars of UPN (Gaither, Peele); a Dutch skateboarder (Meyers) shares drugs with his new roommate (Pederson); the Schenk parents (Barinholtz, Collins) go at each other's throats during Thanksgiving dinner; Kathy Griffin invites Entertainment Tonight to her D-List Celebrity Thanksgiving Special, where she forces her parents to work on gift bags, has a chat with Cris Judd (Barinholtz) & Coolio (Spears), and sings "Shortenin' Bread" with David Hasselhoff (McDonald), Justin Guarini (Peele), and John Tesh (Meyers). Featuring: Daniele Gaither, Nicole Parker, Jordan Peele Absent: Gillian Vigman
205	9	"Episode 9"	TBA	December 6, 2003
The anchors (Meyers, Parker, Spears, Vogt) of Today dance to the music of P. Diddy (Spears) and Lenny Kravitz (Peele); Mofaz (McDonald) tells his troubles to another passenger (Parker) on an airplane; a mariachi band (Pederson, Peele, Vogt) insults the patrons (Barinholtz, Gaither, Meyers, Weir) at a Mexican restaurant; Andy Rooney (Caliendo) gets censored during his commentary on expression origins on 60 Minutes; Spishak promotes a deer zapper; Patrick McCallister (McDonald) makes fun of his Special Olympics competitors (Gaither, Pederson, Vogt); the Lakers welcome their first gay basketball player (Peele) in order to combat news of sexual misconduct against female fans; Dr. Phil (McDonald) can't handle his guests' (Parker, Weir) problems; Mo Collins and Aries Spears conduct interviews at the Vibe Awards. Featuring: Daniele Gaither, Nicole Parker, Jordan Peele Absent: Gillian Vigman
206	10	"Episode 10"	John C. McGinley	December 13, 2003
The Lord of the Bling saga comes to an anticlimactic end; after a shopper (McDonald) gets hooked on Abercrombie & Fitch clothing, he becomes an employee; a news anchorman (Barinholtz) attempts to correct the frequent mistakes in his reports; the Game Show Network airs a new program called The Lillian Verner Game Show; Wynonna Judd (Weir) makes an emergency call in a parody of OnStar commercials; Lorraine (Collins) calms down her wailing infant nephew; John C. McGinley plays a disgruntled postal worker who goes on a murder spree, only to be shown up by other postal workers (McDonald, Spears) planning a rampage; Connie Chung (Lee) reports live from the baby shower of Kate Hudson (Vigman); Smash Mouth (Barinholtz, Pederson, Meyers, Vogt) plugs a new commercial jingle on Access Hollywood. Featuring: Daniele Gaither, Nicole Parker, Jordan Peele, Gillian Vigman
207	11	"Episode 11"	Sara Rue, Westside Connection, LL Cool J	December 20, 2003
A Christmas special with Elizabeth Smart (Parker); the Power-Slut Girls (voices of Collins, Gaither, Parker) save Christmas so the media will focus on them; Michael Moore's (Vogt) newest documentary blames the Bush family for everything; Woody Allen (Pederson) and Soon-Yi Previn (Lee) wish everyone a Happy Hanukkah; Renée Zellweger (Parker) announces her Christmas wish; Suge Knight (Spears) promotes a court-ordered Christmas album; Marvin Tikvah (McDonald) entertains kids while dressed as Santa Claus; a teenage housesitter (Rue) becomes paranoid after watching a news report about a serial killer who goes after housesitters; the Schenk parents (Barinholtz, Collins) continue their dysfunctional tirades during Christmas in front of their houseguests (Paull, Vogt); Mo Collins and Aries Spears join LL Cool J in wishing everyone a Merry Christmas. Westside Connection perform "Gangsta Nation". Featuring: Daniele Gaither, Nicole Parker, Melissa Paull, Jordan Peele Absent: Gillian Vigman Notes: Melissa Paull's first episode as a featured cast member.
208	12	"Episode 12"	Nicole Richie	January 10, 2004
Chingy (Peele) raps about Michael Jackson's (Spears) child molestation charges; commercial parody of Sprint phones; Nicole Richie shares a hole with Saddam Hussein (McDonald) in a parody of The Simple Life; parents' (Vogt, Weir) home movies reveal how dangerous their kids' (Caliendo, Paull, Vigman) childhoods were; Britney Spears (Parker) makes an emergency call from Las Vegas in another parody of OnStar; Dorothy Lanier (Weir) caters to the homeless; Celebrity Injustice host Renton Rice (Spears) fumes over the show's bellowing announcer (Vogt); a man (McDonald) begs his sick girlfriend (Weir) to have sex with him; a Snow White impersonator (Parker) and a black woman (Spears) audition to be Disney World's newest Snow White cast member. Featuring: Nicole Parker, Melissa Paull, Jordan Peele, Gillian Vigman Absent: Ike Barinholtz, Mo Collins, Daniele Gaither, Bobby Lee, Ron Pederson
209	13	"Episode 13"	Shane Mosley, Jeff Probst, Nicole Sullivan	January 17, 2004
John Madden (Caliendo) reviews the latest movies; Shannen Doherty (Paull) scares transvestite Andra (McDonald) on Scare Tactics; Dr. Kylie Johnson (Weir) checks on a couple (Barinholtz, Paull) who are having problems conceiving a baby; Sugar Shane Mosley promotes sbc with Oscar De La Hoya (Spears) and Jim Rome (Caliendo); Jeff Probst hosts a special celebrity edition of Survivor featuring Clay Aiken (Pederson), Meg Ryan (Sullivan), Jack Nicholson (Caliendo), 50 Cent (Spears), Dr. Phil (McDonald), Charlotte Rae (Vogt), and Connie Chung (Lee); a coach (Barinholtz) tries to explain his team's failure at a press conference; Michael Jackson (Spears) and Scott Peterson (McDonald) move into a ranch in a parody of The Simple Life. Featuring: Melissa Paull, Gillian Vigman Absent: Mo Collins, Daniele Gaither, Nicole Parker, Jordan Peele
210	14	"Episode 14"	Aisha Tyler, Ruben Studdard	February 7, 2004
A parody of Gilmore Girls is wrapped up in cuteness, pop culture references, and nonstop walking and talking; Kobe Bryant (Spears) has thoughts of young white women hitting on him in an Expedia.com commercial parody; Leona Campbell (Weir) expresses concern over Donald Trump's (Caliendo) hairdo while watching The Apprentice; Kim Jong-Il (Lee) hosts his own talk show; Stuart Larkin (McDonald) and his mom (Collins) bother their next-door neighbor (Vogt); Aisha Tyler stars in a parody of blaxploitation films; Celine Dion (Parker) stars in a parody of car commercials. Ruben Studdard performs "What Is Sexy". Featuring: Daniele Gaither, Keegan-Michael Key, Nicole Parker, Jordan Peele, Gillian Vigman Absent: Ike Barinholtz, Josh Meyers, Melissa Paull Notes: Keegan-Michael Key's first episode as a featured cast member.
211	15	"Episode 15"	Snoop Dogg, Don "Magic" Juan	February 14, 2004
Abercrombie & Fitch employees (Barinholtz, Meyers, Pederson) don't like their new co-worker (Lee); Jovan Muskatelle (Key) reviews his generation of raving lunatics; a special Valentine's Day edition of The Lillian Verner Game Show; a vacation at Disneyland turns sinister; critics give reviews of Two and a Half Men; various actors (Barinholtz, Lee, Meyers, McDonald, Pederson, Vogt) get registered to become porno stars at The Bureau of Porno Actors; Snoop Dogg and Don "Magic" Juan appear on an episode of Real Motherf***ing Talk; violent events are featured in an evening newscast; the Philip Morris underhandedly glorifies smoking; Patti LaBelle (Gaither) guest-stars in a sitcom with an overly-long opening sequence. Featuring: Daniele Gaither, Keegan-Michael Key, Nicole Parker, Melissa Paull Absent: Frank Caliendo, Mo Collins, Gillian Vigman Notes: Melissa Paull's last episode as a featured cast member.
212	16	"Episode 16"	Anna Faris	February 21, 2004
Mike Tyson (Spears) tries to reclaim his money and his boxing championship with his "I'll Fight Anyone" tour; Jay Leno (Caliendo) shuffles through all his guests (actress Kelly Ripa (Vigman), singer Celine Dion (Parker), Blue Man Group, The White Stripes, NASCAR driver Jeff Gordon and others) due to wasting the first half of his show with his monologues; Star Jones (Gaither) has trouble fitting into her shoes in a Payless commercial; the Game Show Network presents a classic episode of The Price Is Right from 1977; Anna Faris films a samurai movie with Bae Sung (Lee); Lorraine (Collins) and her relatives (Barinholtz, Caliendo, Lee, Meyers, Pederson, Spears, Vogt) crash the campsite of another couple (McDonald, Weir); a business deal to save a sweater factory goes awry thanks to static electricity. Featuring: Daniele Gaither, Nicole Parker, Gillian Vigman Absent: Keegan-Michael Key, Jordan Peele
213	17	"Episode 17"	Bill O'Reilly	February 28, 2004
A woman (Weir) with commitment issues fails to impress her friends (Gaither, Parker, Vigman) with Crest Whitestrips; Dot (Weir) competes in a spelling bee; Rusty Miller (McDonald) makes nice with Oscar-nominated celebrities (Parker, Vigman, Weir); Bill O'Reilly joins Al Roker (Key) and Paula Zahn (Vigman) to decide who should become the next president; characters from Cold Mountain (Meyers, Parker, Vigman) and The Lord of the Rings (Barinholtz, Caliendo, Pederson, Peele) compete in a game of Family Feud; the Olsen twins (Weir) get ready for the school dance while the perverted male staff (Key, McDonald, Spears) waits for them to turn 18; a drug dealer (Key) incriminates himself in court with confessions of past crimes to prove that he didn't rob a bank. Featuring: Daniele Gaither, Keegan-Michael Key, Nicole Parker, Jordan Peele, Gillian Vigman Absent: Mo Collins
214	18	"Episode 18"	Chris Jericho, Eddie Guerrero, Kevin Smith, Trish Stratus, Big Show	March 13, 2004
Trojan promotes contraceptive patches for females; Wayne Brady (Spears) welcomes Celine Dion (Parker) to the last episode of his show; a parody of Cold Case features bad hair and 1970s flashbacks; a passionate Mexican Taco Bell employee (Key) makes a scene and gets disciplined by his boss (Gaither); a wedding singer (Pederson) mispronounces the names of the guests at an Indian wedding; Jay Leno (Caliendo) tries to get wrong answers from WWE wrestlers on this installment of "Jay-Walking"; Kevin Smith plays a pirate for a kid's birthday party; Connie Chung (Lee) interviews the cast of Frasier (Barinholtz, Caliendo, Parker, Pederson) on their final episode. Featuring: Daniele Gaither, Keegan-Michael Key, Nicole Parker, Jordan Peele, Gillian Vigman Absent: Mo Collins, Michael McDonald, Paul Vogt
215	19	"Episode 19"	JC Chasez	March 20, 2004
A parody of The Wizard of Oz turns into a series of commercials in a two-part sketch; Regis Philbin (Caliendo) revitalizes his show Who Wants to Be a Millionaire?; Disney turns their It's a Small World ride into a horror movie; Muriel's (Weir) gay grandson (Meyers) visits during The 7 A.M. Condo Report; an urban parody of Crossing Over; an ABC schedule lineup spoof; a traveler (Meyers) must rely on Bae Sung (Lee) to claim his baggage; Bruce Banner (Barinholtz) transforms into a flamboyantly gay monster known as Gay Hulk (Vogt); JC Chasez is a guest on The Kim Jong-Il Show; Barbara Walters (Weir) tries new ventures beyond The View. Featuring: Daniele Gaither, Keegan Michael-Key, Nicole Parker Absent: Mo Collins, Michael McDonald, Jordan Peele, Gillian Vigman
216	20	"Episode 20"	Elisha Cuthbert, Vanessa L. Williams	April 10, 2004
John Madden (Caliendo) recounts his wild spring break vacation; the announcer of a commercial (Meyers) claims that money is the cure for depression; Elisha Cuthbert finds herself in a parody of 24; Geert (Meyers) begins work at a sunglasses store; Vanessa L. Williams appears on another installment of QVC's Fashion Corner, where she and her co-host (Weir) make fun of middle-aged women (Gaither, Parker); Ike Barinholtz and Josh Meyers reenact Romeo and Juliet during Hitprov; a villain (Peele) working as a supermarket clerk runs into his rival (Barinholtz); Benjamin Franklin (Vogt) sends Samuel Adams (Meyers) to the future to see if the American Revolution was a success. Featuring: Daniele Gaither, Nicole Parker, Jordan Peele, Gillian Vigman Absent: Mo Collins, Michael McDonald, Keegan Micheal-Key
217	21	"Episode 21"	Cedric the Entertainer	April 17, 2004
On Average Asian, Hideki (Lee) puts up with women (Parker, Vigman, Weir) who think he adheres to Asian stereotypes; a movie trailer for a generic thriller stars Ashley Judd (Parker), Morgan Freeman (Peele), Laurence Fishburne (Key), and Samuel L. Jackson (Spears); a 1986 episode of The Price Is Right aired on the Game Show Network featuring future famous and infamous faces, such as Martha Stewart (Weir), Tonya Harding (Parker), Jeffrey Dahmer (Meyers), and Wayne Brady (Spears); Cedric the Entertainer stars in another low-rent installment of Funkenstein; during a trial, Bae Sung (Lee) is called to the stand as a translator for the defendant; a man's (Barinholtz) proposal to his girlfriend (Vigman) at an Italian restaurant is ruined by the owners (Parker, Pederson); a therapist (McDonald) is baffled when his patients (Caliendo, Vogt, Weir) claim they see aliens. Featuring: Daniele Gaither, Keegan-Michael Key, Nicole Parker, Jordan Peele, Gillian Vigman Absent: Mo Collins
218	22	"Episode 22"	Rachel Bilson, Adam Brody, Benjamin McKenzie	May 1, 2004
On The Montel Williams Show, Angela Wright (Weir), with her brother Billy (Meyers) and cousin Natalie (Vogt), show a video clip of their attempt at saving a wheelchair-using woman (Parker) from drowning; an alternate ending to The Wizard of Oz has an angry Dorothy (Parker) going off on Glinda the Good Witch (Weir); a chubby chaser (Weir) has her eyes on Marvin Tikvah (McDonald); stars of The O.C. appear in a parody co-starring former American Idol contestants Clay Aiken (Pederson), Justin Guarini (Peele), and William Hung (Lee); Sean Gidcomb (McDonald) insults his employees' (Meyers, Weir) kids that were brought to work; a chef (Vigman) on The Food Network has a mental breakdown after spending 22 hours cooking nothing but egg-related dishes. Featuring: Keegan-Michael Key, Nicole Parker, Jordan Peele, Gillian Vigman Absent: Ike Barinholtz, Frank Caliendo, Daniele Gaither, Mo Collins, Aries Spears
219	23	"Episode 23"	Jennifer Coolidge, Frankie Muniz	May 8, 2004
Whoopi Goldberg (Peele) promotes SlimFast products; Frankie Muniz stars as a hypochondriac who visits Dr. Kylie Johnson (Weir); Coach Hines (Key) threatens students at an assembly; a special Mother's Day edition of The Lillian Verner Game Show; a wife (Weir) wants to know if her husband (Barinholtz) talks in his sleep about how ugly she is; Jennifer Coolidge plays a bimbo secretary during a sexual harassment seminar run by her boss (McDonald); a drunk man's (McDonald) fantasy world is vastly different from his reality. Featuring: Keegan-Michael Key, Nicole Parker, Jordan Peele Absent: Frank Caliendo, Mo Collins, Daniele Gaither, Bobby Lee, Josh Meyers, Ron Pederson, Aries Spears, Gillian Vigman
220	24	"Episode 24"	Tom Bergeron	May 15, 2004
Parody of UPS commercials creates scatological innuendo from the word "brown"; Mofaz (McDonald) takes his daughter (Barinholtz) to her prom; Tom Bergeron hosts another episode of Hollywood Squares with Andra (McDonald) and James (Meyers) from Boy Meets Boy as contestants; a man (Meyers) tries to escape from his dog-loving wife (Collins) by threatening suicide; giant Dominic Sandy (McDonald) catches insults from customers (Caliendo, Parker, Weir) while working at a fast food restaurant; a man (Key) who's been shot in the head is forced to wait in a hospital waiting room; a promo for a sexual enhancement drug is advertised in metaphors; the Kappa Kappa Kappa sorority members (Collins, Gaither, Parker, Weir) make over an ugly student (Vogt); a reporter (Pederson) lands in hot water while interviewing a black man (Spears) about the death of his brother. Featuring: Daniele Gaither, Keegan-Michael Key, Nicole Parker, Gillian Vigman Absent: Jordan Peele Notes: Mo Collins' last episode as a cast member. Gillian Vigman's last episode as a featured cast member.
221	25	"Episode 25"	David Alan Grier, Fred Willard	May 22, 2004
Abercrombie & Fitch employees (Barinholtz, Meyers, Pederson) help deliver a baby for a pregnant woman (Weir); the "Man-Up" Brothers (Key, Peele) break jinxes before a basketball game; Morgan Freeman (Peele) and other celebrities (Caliendo, Gaither, Lee, McDonald, Parker, Pederson, Spears) read Civil War-era letters; Stuart Larkin (McDonald) annoys his neighbor Harvey (Vogt) during a poker game; David Alan Grier and Fred Willard appear on an episode of Real Mother****ing Talk; the Game Show Network digs up an episode of The Price Is Right set in prehistoric times featuring Og Roddy (Caliendo) and Rock Barker (McDonald); Dr. Funkenstein (Key) and his monster (Peele) team up with the Invisible Man (Spears) to defeat a werewolf hooker (Gaither). Featuring: Daniele Gaither, Keegan-Michael Key, Nicole Parker, Jordan Peele Notes: Josh Meyers' last episode as a cast member. Mo Collins is featured in the opening credits, despite no longer being part of the cast, as of the previous episode.

== Home releases ==
Season 9 of Mad TV has not been released on DVD. However, several sketches culled from this season appear on a compilation DVD called Mad TV: The Best of Seasons 8, 9, and 10 (first released on October 25, 2005). The 200th episode was also included in the MadTV Season 1 Boxset.

When HBO Max streamed this series, episodes 1, 4, 11, 14, and 19 were omitted. Episode 9 initially was unavailable due to technical issues, but was reuploaded to be playable. Howdy and Tubi also stream season nine without episodes 1, 4, 11, 14, and 19, and can play episode nine with no technical difficulty.
