= Michael Reitz =

Michael P Reitz is a film and TV hair stylist, hair design, hair extension design and lacefront wig work on the hit TV series Alias, which ran on ABC for over five years. He currently occupies the position of department head hair stylist at Star Request Film and Television, where he has worked on a number of high-profile productions.

== Career ==
Reitz was nominated for five consecutive years (2001–2006) to receive an Emmy Award in recognition of his hair design work on Alias. He was reported to have a collection of over 75 wigs crafted specially for the character of Sydney Bristow. Reitz was also recognized by his peers in 2003, when won a Hollywood Makeup Artists And Hair Stylists Guild Award for his work in Alias. Reitz has worked with Alias star Jennifer Garner on several other productions, including the superhero film Elektra directed by Rob Bowman.

Reitz worked with Jennifer Love Hewitt on the CBS show Ghost Whisperer from 2005-2010.

Other notable celebrity clients have included Claudia Schiffer, John Travolta, Robert Downey Jr., Catherine Zeta-Jones, Sarah Winter and Kylie Minogue.

== In the media ==
Reitz's work has appeared on several magazine features, including:

- TV Guide: cover, February 8–14, 2003.
- TV Guide: cover, September 21–27, 2003.
- Movieline: October 1999, Sarah Wynter article pg 18.
- Allure: April 2007, images pgs 202 – 203.
- Marie Claire: The Hair Issue: 10 best TV hairstyles to steal 2004
- Newsweek, September 6, pg 64 "Coast to Coast" Arts & Entertainment
- The Hollywood Reporter "Anatomy of a Hit", cover, featuring the looks of Michael P. Reitz, April 26, 2006
- OK Magazine, October 2, 2006 pg 62-67 Jennifer Love Hewitt
- Marie Claire, May 2004, presented by Neutrogena, 13 Going On 30 poster, Jennifer Garner, pgs 41, 42
- American Salon, January 2005, pg 44.

== Awards and nominations ==
=== Nominated for Emmy Award for Alias ===
- 2006 Outstanding Hairstyling for a Series
- 2005 Outstanding Hairstyling for a Series
- 2004 Outstanding Hairstyling for a Series
- 2003 Outstanding Hairstyling for a Series
- 2002 Outstanding Hairstyling for a Series

=== 2004 Hollywood Makeup Artist and Hair Stylist Guild Award ===
- Nominated
  - Best Character Hair Styling - Television Series for: "Alias" (2001)
  - Best Contemporary Hair Styling - Television Series for: "Alias" (2001)

=== 2003 Hollywood Makeup Artist and Hair Stylist Guild Award ===
- Winner
  - Best Character Hair Styling - Television Series for: "Alias" (2001)
- Nominated
  - Best Contemporary Hair Styling - Television Series for: "Alias" (2001)

== Filmography ==
Make-up department:

- Ghost Whisperer (hair stylist: Jennifer Love Hewitt) (18 episodes, 2006–2007)
- Catch and Release (2006/II) (hair stylist: Ms. Garner)
- Alias (hair stylist) (105 episodes, 2001–2006) (wig designer: Jennifer Garner) (61 episodes, 2001–2006)
- Elektra (2005) (hair stylist: Jennifer Garner) (as Michael Peter Reitz)
- 13 Going on 30 (2004) (hair stylist: Jennifer Garner)
- Daredevil (2003) (hair stylist: Jennifer Garner)
- Lucky Numbers (2000) (hair stylist) (as Michael P. Reitz)
- Action (1999) TV series (hair designer: Illeana Douglas) (unknown episodes)
- Stigmata (1999) (hair stylist)
- Friends & Lovers (1999) (hair stylist)
- Desperate But Not Serious (1999) (hair designer: Claudia Schiffer) (as Michael P. Reitz)
- Brimstone (1998) TV series (key hair stylist) (unknown episodes)
- Sweet Valley High (1994) TV series (hair department head) (unknown episodes, 1994–1998)
- Blindfold: Acts of Obsession (1994) (TV) (hair stylist) (as Michael P. Reitz)
