= Mad TV season 10 =

Season of television series

Mad TV
- Season 10
- No. of episodes: 23

Release
- Original network: Fox
- Original release: September 18, 2004 – May 21, 2005

Season chronology
- ← Previous; Season 9 Next → Season 11

The tenth season of Mad TV, an American sketch comedy series, originally aired in the United States on the Fox Network between September 18, 2004, and May 21, 2005.

== Summary ==
With MADtv in its tenth year on FOX, the show continued to change with cast turnover. Mo Collins left while Josh Meyers was fired, and featured cast members Gillian Vigman and Melissa Paull were let go. The only new cast members this season were Crista Flanagan (who was promoted to repertory player in the next season) and Spencer Kayden (who became one in a long line of microscopically short-lived MADtv players who joined the cast in the middle of the season, barely appeared in sketches, and were immediately fired at its end). Despite the lack of new cast members, the show saw an abundance of featured players getting promoted to repertory status, as seen with the promotions of Daniele Gaither, Keegan-Michael Key, Nicole Parker, and Jordan Peele, all of whom became the show's most memorable cast members since the days of the original 1995–1996 cast. Jordan Peele did not appear in the first four episodes, however, he returned in the fifth episode.

This season saw many departures by the season's end. Aries Spears, who had been a cast member since season three, left the show after eight years, tying Debra Wilson's then-record for longest tenure as a MADtv cast member, which would later be surpassed by Michael McDonald's ten years. Ron Pederson and Paul Vogt would also say goodbye to the show. While Vogt quit so he could work on Broadway, Pederson was fired due to FOX cutting the show's cast budget.

Notable celebrity guest stars this season include: Jon Heder, Alanis Morissette, Charla Faddoul, Mirna Hindoyan, Bill Maher, Ja Rule, former MADtv cast members Mo Collins, Nicole Sullivan, Debra Wilson, Artie Lange, and Will Sasso; Marilyn Manson, Nelly, Nicole Richie, Amber Tamblyn, Michael Cera, Tony Hale, Christopher Masterson and his brother, Danny; Flava Flav, and Jeff Probst.

== Opening montage ==
The title sequence begins with the Mad TV logo appearing above the Los Angeles skyline. The theme song, which is performed by the hip-hop group Heavy D & the Boyz, begins and each repertory cast member is introduced alphabetically, followed by the featured cast. When all cast members and guests are introduced, the music stops and the title sequence ends with the phrase "You are now watching Mad TV."

== Cast ==
Repertory cast members

- Ike Barinholtz (23/23 episodes)
- Frank Caliendo (13/23 episodes)
- Daniele Gaither (22/23 episodes)
- Keegan-Michael Key (22/23 episodes)
- Bobby Lee (21/23 episodes)
- Michael McDonald (22/23 episodes)
- Nicole Parker (23/23 episodes)
- Ron Pederson (22/23 episodes)
- Jordan Peele (15/23 episodes)
- Aries Spears (18/23 episodes)
- Paul Vogt (22/23 episodes)
- Stephnie Weir (23/23 episodes)

Featured cast members

- Crista Flanagan (5/23 episodes; first episode: February 5, 2005)
- Spencer Kayden (4/23 episodes; first episode: February 26, 2005/last episode: May 21, 2005)

== Writers ==
- Bryan Adams (eps. 1–23)
- Ike Barinholtz (eps. 19, 23)
- Dick Blasucci (eps. 1–23)
- Alex Borstein (ep. 12)
- Kal Clarke (ep. 9)
- Chris Cluess (eps. 1–23)
- Mo Collins (ep. 14)
- Steven Cragg (eps. 1–23)
- John Crane (eps. 1–23)
- Lauren Dombrowski (eps. 1–23)
- Crista Flanagan (eps. 16, 17, 21)
- Michael Hitchcock (eps. 1–23)
- Jennifer Joyce (eps. 1–23)
- Keegan-Michael Key (eps. 5, 13)
- Scott King (writing supervisor) (eps. 1–23)
- Jason Kordelos (eps. 1–23)
- Bobby Lee (ep. 21)
- Bruce McCoy (eps. 1–23)
- Michael McDonald (eps. 2, 4, 5, 7, 10, 11, 14, 18, 20, 23)
- Nicole Parker (eps. 10, 15, 19)
- Jordan Peele (eps. 5, 10, 15, 19, 23)
- Robert Porch (ep. 17)
- Tami Sagher (eps. 1–23)
- David Salzman (eps. 1–23)
- Greg Ungar (ep. 21)
- Stephnie Weir (eps. 1, 4, 6, 10, 12, 17, 20, 22)
- Maiya Williams (eps. 1–23)
- Jim Wise (eps. 1–23)

== Episodes ==
No. overall	No. in season	Title	Guest(s)	Original release date
222	1	"Episode 1"	Charla Faddoul, Mirna Hindoyan	September 18, 2004
Michael McDonald, Stephine Weir, and Bobby Lee showcase three new intros to start off the new season; Jovan Muskatelle (Key) reviews the latest movies during a live newscast; Angela (Weir) and Natalie (Vogt) get attacked by Secret Service agents (Barinholtz, Key, Pederson) and rabid squirrels while trying to interview George W. Bush; Bill Cosby (Spears) promotes Jell-O shots for a reluctant single mother (Parker) and her foster children; the rugged Abercrombie & Fitch employees (Barinholtz, McDonald, Pederson) have competition in the form of Lane Bryant's plus-sized employees (Gaither, Parker, Weir); tired of Ken Jennings (Pederson) hogging all the winnings, Alex Trebek (Barinholtz) tries to rig Jeopardy! in favor of two contestants (Lee, Spears); Charla Faddoul and Mirna Hindoyan appear in a political parody of The Amazing Race; Pizza Hut's new twisted crust pizza has an entire dinner stuffed in the crust. Absent: Jordan Peele
223	2	"Episode 2"	Amanda Beard, Kaitlin Sandeno	September 25, 2004
A parody of Growing Up Gotti shows how far A&E has fallen in its programming; Stephnie Weir apologizes for the previous sketch; a crossover between The Princess Diaries 2 and Alien vs. Predator; Amanda Beard and Kaitlin Sandeno help promote Chili's barbecue sauce with Evander Holyfield (Spears), Mike Tyson (Spears), Ellen DeGeneres (Parker), Tom Brokaw (Caliendo), Eve (Gaither), Clay Aiken (Pederson), Norm MacDonald (Caliendo), Robin Williams (Caliendo), and Kirstie Alley (Vogt); Coach Hines (Key) becomes disruptive and threatens the lives of others during a funeral; George W. Bush (Caliendo) and John Kerry (McDonald) begin their debates; Bae Sung (Lee) offers to translate for a man who is choking; the Bushes (Caliendo, Weir) and the Kerrys (McDonald, Parker) appear on Trading Spouses. Absent: Jordan Peele
224	3	"Episode 3"	Flavor Flav, Christina Milian, Joe Budden	October 2, 2004
Oprah Winfrey (Gaither) grants wishes for the Mad TV audience; John Madden (Caliendo) reports on the presidential race; P. Diddy (Spears), Ludacris (Key), Britney Spears (Parker), and Kevin Federline (Barinholtz) promote voting on TRL; disgraced school teacher Mary Kay Letourneau (Parker) stars in her own sitcom; Flava Flav appears on Real Motherf**king Talk in a discussion about the 2004 election; on The Ashlee Simpson Show, Simpson (Parker) can't carry a tune nor can she win over her parents' (McDonald, Weir) affections; Jovan Muskatelle (Key) reviews Open Water; senator John Kerry (McDonald) discusses how he would have reacted to 9/11 if he were President. Christina Milian and Joe Budden perform "Whatever U Want". Absent: Jordan Peele
225	4	"Episode 4"	Jon Heder, Alanis Morissette	November 6, 2004
Ashlee Simpson (Parker) experiences another lip-synching gaffe; a parody of FOX's The Swan featuring little girls; the Fantanas (Gaither, Parker, Weir) introduce a new member of their team: 2-Liter Beth (Vogt); 7 A.M. Condo Report hosts, Clifford (Pederson) and Muriel (Weir), try to withstand a hurricane; on this episode of MTV Diary, Alanis Morissette's (Parker) sister, Delicious (Alanis Morissette), becomes the newest sister of a pop singer to try her hand at singing; VH1's nostalgia show, I Love the '00s, causes a rip in the time-space continuum; the Bushes (Caliendo, Weir) and the Kerrys (McDonald, Parker) get drunk on margaritas following the 2004 election; a klutzy stripper (Weir) ruins a bachelor party; Alanis Morisette is a new Abercrombie & Fitch employee; Jon Heder appears as a headstrong nerd on a quiz bowl game show. Absent: Jordan Peele
226	5	"Episode 5"	Will Sasso, Marilyn Manson	November 13, 2004
Will Sasso reunites with Aries Spears and Michael McDonald and tries to introduce a new character; Hideki (Lee) becomes the life of the party on Average Asian; Britney Spears (Parker) sings about her downward career slide; Kobe Bryant (Key) promotes cheap sneakers from a thrift store now that his reputation is in shambles; Will Sasso reprises his impersonation of Kenny Rogers, who hosts a reality show similar to The Apprentice; Stuart Larkin (McDonald) gets a visit from a vacuum cleaner salesman (Key); the Superstitious Knights (Key, Peele) break jinxes at a wedding. Marilyn Manson performs "Personal Jesus". Absent: Frank Caliendo
227	6	"Episode 6"	Bill Maher, Ja Rule	November 20, 2004
Aries Spears, Keegan-Michael Key, and Jordan Peele get into a fight onstage; Ashton Kutcher (Barinholtz), Laura Bush (Weir), and Bill Maher punk George W. Bush (Caliendo) and Dick Cheney (Vogt); Bill Maher and Ja Rule are guests on Real Motherf**king Talk; a The Wizard of Oz parody features Dorothy (Parker) constantly going back to Oz every time her house gets caught in a twister; Dot (Weir) competes in a beauty pageant; the slow songs on Norah Jones' (Parker) new album makes for high-energy parties; reporter Jim Rome (Caliendo) and boxer George Foreman (Spears) promote a new grill that cooks turkeys. Ja Rule performs "Wonderful".
228	7	"Episode 7"	Christopher Masterson, Danny Masterson	November 27, 2004
Stephine Weir loses her wedding ring; Dave Foley (Pederson) and William Shatner (Caliendo) host a game show called Celebrity Quarters with Kathy Griffin (Parker), Morgan Freeman (Peele), Samuel L. Jackson (Spears), and Connie Chung (Lee) as contestants; employees (Parker, Vogt, Weir) must ask for permission to get office supplies from paranoid floor manager Sean Gidcomb (McDonald); dwarves attack a patrol officer (Vogt) below the belt when he pulls them over for speeding; Ike Barinholtz and Aries Spears interview celebrities at the 2004 Vibe Awards; Dorothy Lanier (Weir) sings musical numbers aboard an airplane while working as a flight attendant; Dr. Funkenstein (Key) and Blacula (Spears) battle the Creature from the White Lagoon (Gaither); Christopher and Danny Masterson play lawyers who harass their client (Barinholtz).
229	8	"Episode 8"	Avril Lavigne	December 11, 2004
Roland Backinson (Pederson) promotes his Verb Alert home security alarm system; Al Jazeera broadcasts news and death threats to America; Avril Lavigne stars in a sex education video from the '70s; Clifford (Pederson) and Muriel (Weir) host the 7 A.M. Condo Report live from Mexico; Lillian Verner Game Show champion Gail Cinder (Weir) competes with a foul-mouthed ventriloquist (Parker) and an incoherent Smurf collector (Key); John Kerry (McDonald) and Mofaz (McDonald) talk about their problems; show writer Steven Cragg gets another chance to say goodbye to his dad by recording a tape. Avril Lavigne performs "Nobody's Home". Absent: Frank Caliendo, Bobby Lee, Jordan Peele
230	9	"Episode 9"	Nelly	December 18, 2004
The Fantana girls (Gaither, Parker, Weir) and 2 Liter Beth (Vogt) promote new holiday soda flavors; a Christmas episode of Celebrity Quarters has Renée Zellweger (Parker), Richard Simmons (Vogt), Ron Artest (Spears), William Hung (Lee), and Anna Nicole Smith (Weir) as contestants; the Abercrombie & Fitch boys (Barinholtz, McDonald, Pederson) hire minorities (Key, Peele, Spears); being on the Miami Heat doesn't stop Shaq (Spears) from dissing the Lakers on the newest installment of Shaq and the (Former) Super Lakers; GAP commercial parody has captions questioning why Sarah Jessica Parker (Parker) is doing this and a stoned, guitar-playing Lenny Kravitz (Peele); Ike Barinholtz and Aries Spears conduct red-carpet interviews at the 2004 Billboard Music Awards; guests (McDonald, Key, Peele) talk about December holidays with Dollar Bill Montgomery (Spears) on Real Motherf**king Talk; a group of Christmas carolers (Parker, Pederson, Peele, Vogt) annoy shopping mall patrons (Barinholtz, Weir) with their overzealous singing. Nelly performs "Na-NaNa-Na".
231	10	"Episode 10"	The Hives	January 8, 2005
A parody of The People's Court has Yvonne Criddle (Gaither) admitting to lying to social services about her neighbor (Parker) abusing her children because she unintentionally left a pile of leaves in her yard; Bae Sung (Lee) offers assistance at an auto repair shop; Special Patrick (McDonald) makes offensive statements while hosting the news; Ray Charles (Spears) contends with Japanese demons (Lee) haunting his house in this mash-up of Ray and The Grudge; a woman (Weir) embarrasses her husband (Barinholtz) about his sex problems; an interracial couple (Parker, Peele) hosts a show called Inside Looking Out; Marvin Tikvah (McDonald) gets swimming lessons from two swimming instructors (Weir, Gaither); a scuba-diving couple (McDonald, Weir) are stranded at sea in a loose parody of Open Water. The Hives perform "Two-Timing Touch and Broken Bones". Absent: Frank Caliendo
232	11	"Episode 11"	Nicole Richie, The Donnas	January 22, 2005
Kelly Clarkson (Parker), Ruben Studdard (Spears), Fantasia (Gaither), Clay Aiken (Pederson), Justin Guarini (Peele), Diana Degarmo (Vogt), and William Hung (Lee) sing about how American Idol affected their lives; with the help of a new sidekick (Pederson), Matthew the Bible Dude (McDonald) fights the sin of listening to Hilary Duff songs without permission; Dr. Kylie Johnson (Weir) prepares to give breast implants to an insecure girl (Parker); Nicole Richie appears as Kelly Ripa in a parody of Pantene commercials; a Fat Albert parody sees the title character (voice of Spears) suffer a heart attack after eating one too many burgers; a nerdy boy (Pederson) and his friends (Parker, Vogt) admire his cool older brother (McDonald), who constantly gets scolded by his mother (Weir) for being a slacker; Kim Jong Il (Lee) interviews Donald Trump (Caliendo) and his wife Melania (Parker). The Donnas perform "I Don't Want to Know". Absent: Keegan-Michael Key
233	12	"Episode 12"	Alex Borstein, Terry Bradshaw, James Brown, Seth Green, Jimmy Johnson, Howie Long	February 5, 2005
A parody of Extreme Makeover: Home Edition has the crew (Barinholtz, Flanagan, Parker, Pederson, Vogt) unintentionally make the home of a misfortunate family (Gaither, Key, Lee, Peele) even worse; the hosts of Fox NFL Sunday appear in several pre-game skits with Anna Nicole Smith (Weir); Dot (Weir) gets a psychological evaluation before being prescribed behavior-modifying pills; Alex Borstein reprises her roles as Ms. Swan and Mama Brightling; Frank Caliendo and Ike Barinholtz go to the home of this year's Super Bowl and conduct interviews; during a strike organization, the leader (McDonald) uses racist remarks to make a point. Featuring: Crista Flanagan Absent: Aries Spears Notes: Crista Flanagan's first episode as a featured cast member.
234	13	"Episode 13"	Nicole Sullivan, Debra Wilson	February 12, 2005
John Madden (Caliendo) promotes a new birdhouse maker from Ace Hardware and violently injures himself trying to build it; Oprah (Wilson) and Dr. Phil (McDonald) help a victim (Vogt) of a recent hurricane; two senior citizens (McDonald, Weir) won't accept help from a young couple (Barinholtz, Parker) when it's really needed; a hungover American woman (Parker) finds herself on a Middle Eastern version of The Price is Right; Hispanic girls Lida (Sullivan) and Melina (Wilson) are contestants on MTV Spring Break; Tovah McQueen (Wilson) and Belma Buttons (Spears) interview Ashlee Simpson (Parker) on another installment of Reality Check; Bae Sung (Lee) is the only person who can help a businessman (Barinholtz) communicate with the French at an airport; a Desperate Housewives parody features Botoxed older actresses (Barinholtz, Key, Parker, Weir) and a theme park next to the set. Absent: Crista Flanagan, Daniele Gaither, Jordan Peele
235	14	"Episode 14"	Mo Collins, Susan Sarandon	February 19, 2005
A parody of "Drop It Like It's Hot" tackles the effects of marijuana smoking; a woman (Vogt) fantasizes about how perfect her life would be if she bought greeting cards from Hallmark; while Stuart Larkin (McDonald) and his mom (Collins) prepare to move, Doreen flirts with the neighbor, Harvey (Vogt); Lorraine (Collins) and her husband Carl (Vogt) wreak havoc during their visit to a bowling alley; on The Lillian Verner Game Show, Gail Cinder (Weir) retains her championship crown against a prop comic (Peele) and chinless Carol Finney (Collins); Susan Sarandon plays a greedy relative who seduces her sister's (Weir) husband (McDonald); technical difficulties constantly affect the evening news. Absent: Frank Caliendo, Crista Flanagan, Bobby Lee, Aries Spears
236	15	"Episode 15"	Colby Donaldson, Artie Lange, Jeff Probst	February 26, 2005
A parody of Lost; Clifford (Pederson) and Muriel (Weir) discuss the latest Academy Award nominees; Artie Lange guest stars in a sketch where alcoholics (Gaither, Key, McDonald, Weir) hold an intervention for their sober friend (Barinholtz); the hosts (Parker, Peele) of Inside Looking Out are interrupted by their Jewish landlord (Barinholtz); a new drama series known as The B.S. follows the lives of various employees (Barinholtz, Gaither, Lee, McDonald, Vogt, Weir) at a superstore; Morgan Freeman (Peele) introduces the first black inventor (Key) who came up with stereotypically black products and concepts. Featuring: Crista Flanagan, Spencer Kayden Absent: Frank Caliendo, Aries Spears Notes: Spencer Kayden's first episode as a featured cast member.
237	16	"Episode 16"	TBA	March 12, 2005
Dr. Phil (McDonald) profiles dysfunctional families; Michael Jackson (Spears) breaks into parodies of his greatest hits while in court for lewd conduct with minors; Rusty Miller (McDonald) allows George W. Bush (Caliendo) and Condoleezza Rice (Gaither) to answer questions from the audience; Ike Barinholtz and Ron Pederson interview celebrities at the American Idol party; Tank (Lee) tries to pick up girls (Flanagan, Gaither) at a nightclub; during an audition, a clumsy skater (Flanagan) blames her DJ (Key) for her poor performance; a parody of Million Dollar Baby has Mike Tyson (Spears) in Hilary Swank's (Parker) role. Featuring: Crista Flanagan Absent: Spencer Kayden, Paul Vogt
238	17	"Episode 17"	TBA	March 19, 2005
La La Anthony (Gaither) and SuChin Pak (Lee) premiere a video by Maroon 5 (Barinholtz, Pederson) dedicated to tsunami victims, but the preteen shout-outs kill the solemnity of the message; a Chanel No. 5 commercial parody has Anna Nicole Smith (Weir) as a washed-up actress desperate for love; QVC hostesses (Parker, Weir) mock Mexicans (Gaither, Key, Vogt) with stereotypical fashions and racist remarks; a 1950s film teaches teenage boys (Barinholtz, Pederson) how to phone girls (Flanagan, Parker); a couple (Pederson, Weir) embarrass each other on the news; a woman (Parker) loses her house, her husband (Pederson), and her mind as she shops on eBay; a guy (Barinholtz) must put up with a wacky party girl (Flanagan); show writer Steven Cragg criticizes the lack of quality television and makes his own reality show inside of an ambulance. Featuring: Crista Flanagan Absent: Frank Caliendo, Spencer Kayden, Michael McDonald, Jordan Peele, Aries Spears
239	18	"Episode 18"	TBA	April 9, 2005
Officer Rufus Champagne (Vogt) responds to a domestic disturbance and, once again, gets attacked by little people; Marvin Tikvah (McDonald) wakes up in a tough love drug rehab center; Jorge (Key) still gives customers (Barinholtz, Vogt) a hard time at Taco Bell; a drunk, cynical old man (McDonald) complains about the world to his daughter (Parker) and her boyfriend (Barinholtz); a married woman (Weir) hosts an Ellen DeGeneres-type show while her husband is away; Cindy Delmont (Vogt) files a sexual harassment complaint to her boss (McDonald), but her boss doesn't believe her due to her weight; show writer Steven Cragg makes his own sex tape. Absent: Frank Caliendo, Crista Flanagan, Spencer Kayden, Jordan Peele
240	19	"Episode 19"	TBA	April 23, 2005
New urban comedy The Barbecue Bus has a smooth-talking Snoop Dogg (Key), a wise-cracking Mo'Nique (Gaither), a sassy Queen Latifah (Spears), and a gigglesome Jimmy Fallon (Pederson); celebrities (Caliendo, Lee, Parker, Pederson, Peele) record their voices for Sprint ringtones; Coach Hines (Key) ruins career day with his threats and high kicks; a bride-to-be (Parker) is turned into a sleazy tramp by her husband (Barinholtz) in a parody of Pimp My Ride; Cindy Delmont (Vogt) hopes to buy a Mini Cooper, but the salesman (McDonald) is afraid her weight will break the car; another installment of Inside Looking Out; John Madden (Caliendo) promotes the new Abs-Zapper with former model Christie Brinkley (Weir); the president (Key) of the Detroit Institute for Star Naming offers to name stars after people in an advertisement; Bobby Lee introduces a new hip-hop band called Yo Ma Ma (Barinholtz, Parker, Peele). Absent: Crista Flanagan, Spencer Kayden
241	20	"Episode 20"	Artie Lange	April 30, 2005
Michael McDonald displays his dog training talents; Sherry the stripper (Weir) gets into accidents while performing at a birthday party; Coach Hines (Key) threatens his basketball players during a game; Gail Cinder (Weir) competes with a man who has acne (Barinholtz) and a man who likes to pretend he's a stuffed animal (McDonald) on The Lillian Verner Game Show; Artie Lange appears on Inside the Actors Studio to talk about how he got fired from Mad TV; the 2005 Miss Teen USA pageant has overdeveloped teenage girls; a neglected wife (Kayden) has a conversation with herself while her husband (Key) sleeps. Featuring: Spencer Kayden Absent: Frank Caliendo, Crista Flanagan, Jordan Peele, Aries Spears
242	21	"Episode 21"	Michael Cera, Tony Hale	May 7, 2005
Celine Dion (Parker) sings to newborn babies in a new Vegas show; Roland Backinson (Pederson) promotes Verb Alert for cars; on 24 with Bobby Lee, Bobby realizes that he's supposed to be at work today; a Mother's Day edition of Real Motherf**king Talk; Michael Cera and Tony Hale play British police officers in a UK version of COPS; Dr. Funkenstein (Key) and his monster (Peele) fight Queen Nefertiti (Gaither) in another cheaply-made blaxploitation film; Bill Cosby (Spears) invites the stars (Gaither, Key, Peele) of The Cosby Show to return for the 20th Anniversary Reunion special; a married couple (Flanagan, McDonald) recall their botched wedding day on an anniversary tape. Featuring: Crista Flanagan, Spencer Kayden Absent: Frank Caliendo
243	22	"Episode 22"	Ryan Reynolds, Debra Wilson	May 14, 2005
Stephnie Weir is diagnosed with wandering kidneys thanks to years of physical comedy; Tank (Lee) tries to pick up women at the Playboy mansion; Ms. Campbell (Weir) forces a mother (Parker) to remove her son from an R-rated slasher film; on TRL, allegedly deceased rapper DJ MC Escher (Spears) premieres a new hip-hop single that features Julie Andrews (Parker); Ryan Reynolds appears on The B.S. as an INS agent who goes undercover as a security guard; a kissing game between a woman (Weir) and a man (McDonald) goes too far; Bible Dude (McDonald) stops a rebellious kid (Barinholtz) from playing video games; Whitney Houston (Wilson) and Bobby Brown (Spears) get into a dispute while singing duets. Absent: Frank Caliendo, Crista Flanagan, Spencer Kayden, Ron Pederson, Jordan Peele
244	23	"Episode 23"	Nicole Sullivan, Amber Tamblyn	May 21, 2005
Ike Barinholtz invites an audience member to perform a "Literally" bit with him and Nicole Sullivan; the Stroms (McDonald, Weir) think two paramedics (Barinholtz, Peele) are trying to rape them; Amber Tamblyn plays a teen who helps celebrate Average Asian Hideki's (Lee) birthday; Gray (Peele) and Carl (Key) try to break hexes before performing MacBeth on stage; Sean Gidcomb (McDonald) prohibits employees from dating their co-workers in the workplace; a 1950s film about racial tolerance between white families (Barinholtz, Parker, Weir) and black families (Gaither, Key, Peele, Spears); Frank Caliendo performs impersonations of John Madden, Jerry Seinfeld, and George W. Bush; George W. Bush (Caliendo) and Condoleezza Rice (Gaither) introduce the new Indian national security advisor (Kayden). Featuring: Spencer Kayden Absent: Crista Flanagan Notes: Ron Pederson, Aries Spears and Paul Vogt's last episode as cast members. Spencer Kayden's last episode as a featured cast member.

== Home releases ==
Season 10 of Mad TV has not been released on DVD. However, several sketches culled from this season appear on a compilation DVD called Mad TV: The Best of Seasons 8, 9, and 10 (first released on October 25, 2005).

When HBO Max streamed the series, episodes 3, 5, 6, 8, 9, 10, 11, 12, 14, 15, and 21 were omitted. This also applies to Howdy and Tubi.
