= Will & Grace season 7 =

Will & Grace
- Season 7
- American DVD cover
- No. of episodes: 24

Release
- Original network: NBC
- Original release: September 16, 2004 – May 19, 2005

Season chronology
- ← Previous; Season 6 Next → Season 8

The seventh season of Will & Grace premiered on September 16, 2004, and concluded on May 19, 2005. It consisted of 24 episodes.

== Cast and characters ==
=== Main cast ===
- Eric McCormack as Will Truman
- Debra Messing as Grace Adler
- Megan Mullally as Karen Walker
- Sean Hayes as Jack McFarland
- Shelley Morrison as Rosario Salazar

=== Recurring cast ===
- Harry Connick Jr. as Dr. Marvin "Leo" Markus
- Bobby Cannavale as Vince D'Angelo
- Tim Bagley as Larry
- Jerry Levine as Joe
- Leslie Jordan as Beverley Leslie
- Leigh-Allyn Baker as Ellen

=== Special guest stars ===
- Jennifer Lopez as herself
- Janet Jackson as herself
- Will Arnett as Artemus Johnson
- Molly Shannon as Val Bassett
- Kristin Davis as Nadine
- Victor Garber as Peter Bovington
- Rip Taylor as himself
- Jamie-Lynn Sigler as Ro
- Blythe Danner as Marilyn Truman
- Jeff Goldblum as Scott Woolley
- Lily Tomlin as Margot
- Patti LuPone as herself
- Edward Burns as Nick
- Chita Rivera as Lenore
- Michele Lee as Lucille
- Luke Perry as Aaron
- Stuart Townsend as Edward
- Sharon Stone as Dr. Georgia Keller
- Debbie Reynolds as Bobbi Adler
- Alan Arkin as Martin Adler
- Stacy Keach as Wendell Schacter
- Alec Baldwin as Malcolm Widmark
- Seth Green as Randall Finn
- Eric Stoltz as Tom Cassidy

=== Guest stars ===
- Mark Harelik as Tim
- Stephen Tobolowsky as Ned Weathers
- Sam Pancake as Jimmy
- Erinn Hayes as Katherine Fallon
- Larry Poindexter as Dan Fallon
- Roscoe Lee Browne as Linus
- Patrick Fabian as Alan
- John Ducey as Jamie
- Lee Garlington as Annette
- Robert Costanzo as Paul D'Angelo
- Josh Keaton as Salvatore
- Hallee Hirsh as Olivia Walker
- Buck Henry as Leonard
- Eric Allan Kramer as Barry
- Phil Morris as Dr. Norman
- Lee Majors as Burt Wolfe
- Emily Rutherfurd as Joanne
- Bridget Flanery Viv Cassidy

== Episodes ==
No. overall	No. in season	Title	Directed by	Written by	Original release date	Prod. code	U.S. viewers (millions)
147	1	"FYI: I Hurt, Too"	James Burrows	David Flebotte & Alex Herschlag	September 16, 2004	7002	16.55
Grace, in her fury, raids Leo's apartment when he's at work during the day. Leo finally comes over to Will's to talk to Grace, and even though she yells at him and gives him his ring back, she realizes that she's miserable without him. Against Will's advice, she decides to give Leo a second chance, but after one awkward night out to dinner with their friends, Grace realizes she can't make it work and admits that her marriage is completely over. Jack, who is now good friends with Jennifer Lopez, makes the mistake of giving her a song written by Karen at the exact wrong time. Jennifer fires Jack, but because she still likes him as a friend, gets him a job dancing for Janet Jackson.
148	2	"Back Up, Dancer"	James Burrows	Tracy Poust & Jon Kinnally	September 23, 2004	7001	15.32
Jack must compete in a dance-off so he can be a back-up singer for Janet Jackson. Meanwhile, Will has to decide whether to go out with his boyfriend or help Grace cope with her failed marriage.
149	3	"One Gay at a Time"	James Burrows	Sally Bradford	September 30, 2004	7003	12.82
Grace wanders into an AA meeting following a woman carrying donuts and runs into her old crazy friend Val. For the free food and the free therapy, Grace lets everyone, including Val, believe that she has a drinking problem. Luckily, Karen, horrified at the thought of AA, exposes Grace to her meeting. Will and Jack attend a focus group for a new gay cable network, OutTV. Will is offended when no one will listen to his brilliant show ideas, while Jack, with his ridiculous ideas (like naked Jeopardy) gets hired as the VP of New Programming.
150	4	"Company"	James Burrows	Bill Wrubel	October 7, 2004	7004	12.41
Will and Grace meet a new guy in their building, Ned, and Will tries to be friendly, while Grace ignores him and is outright rude. Grace scolds Will for being nice, saying they don't want to get to know any random new people in their building. Later, Grace is in the elevator with Ned, and he mentions that he thinks she's rude. To prove that she's not, Grace invites Ned over for cocktails, and she and Will proceed to have one of the most boring nights of their lives. However, Will can't contain himself, and asks Ned over for dinner on Friday. Ned cancels dinner at the last minute, because his brother got into a car accident and he has to go to the hospital, but when Will and Grace hear music coming from Ned's apartment upstairs, they know they've been lied to. They go upstairs to confront Ned, who tells them that he heard all the terrible things they said about him while he was in the bathroom, and they hurt his feelings. Will and Grace apologize, and sincerely invite Ned over for dinner again. Ned says he's busy having tea with friends, but Will and Grace are welcome to join them. Will and Grace are slightly horrified when they come into Ned's apartment and join a tea party full of stuffed animals. Jack is feeling intimidated by his coworkers with marketing degrees and work experience, and finds himself being a yes-man and just trying to agree with everyone else's opinion on everything. He even goes so far as to throw his Cher doll in the trash when one of his coworkers scoffs at the stereotype that all gay men love Cher. Karen reminds Jack that while his coworkers may have fancy degrees and work experience, while they were stuck in school Jack was watching TV, and he knows TV. Jack is uplifted, and decides to stand up for himself, gaining the respect of his boss. His boss even suggests that Jack should do a documentary on Cher.
151	5	"Key Party"	James Burrows	Sonja Warfield	October 14, 2004	7005	13.00
Will has a bad history with birthdays, but he's really hoping that this one, now that he has a boyfriend, will be better. Vince decides to give Will a key to his apartment for his birthday, but Grace talks him out of it, thinking it will be cheap. Will is disappointed when he gets a wallet from Vince, and the rest of his party goes to hell when Karen is depressed that it's also Stan's birthday, and she and Jack decide to celebrate Stan instead. When Grace sees how sad Will is, she convinces Vince to give Will the key after all, but Will doesn't want it if Vince had to be talked into it. Finally, Grace has to admit that it was all her fault for talking Vince out of it in the first place, and then Will happily accepts his birthday present from his boyfriend.
152	6	"The Newlydreads"	James Burrows	Kate Angelo	October 21, 2004	7006	10.95
Grace's latest design job has her interior decorating for a young and very happy newlywed couple. She tries to keep her cool, but once they announce that they're pregnant and need to decorate a nursery, she just walks out. Karen completes the whole thing for her, and does a very good job. Grace thanks Karen, but then when the young couple compliment Grace on the design, she takes all the credit. Karen is nice and quits being Grace's assistant. Will and Jack get caught up in the cause of saving a gay bookstore that's going out of business because its rent is too high. When Will realizes that a beautiful new gym was planned for the space, he regrets saving the store, because he has been wanting a new gym in his neighborhood. Jack scolds Will for being so fickle, and Will comes around, donating the last of the money needed to save the book store. However, when the owner says that they've now just saved the book store for one more month, both Jack and Will decide that whole thing is a lost cause.
153	7	"Will & Grace & Vince & Nadine"	James Burrows	Gary Janetti	November 4, 2004	7007	11.87
Will and Grace have Vince and his best friend Nadine (Kristin Davis) over for dinner. Nadine is so sweet that she makes Grace nuts, so Grace prods Nadine to admit something that she doesn't like about her best friend, Vince. Nadine explodes that she doesn't like Will, and storms out of the apartment. Will is concerned that this could break up him and Vince, but makes Grace promise not to interfere any more than she already has. Grace promises, but immediately breaks it when she calls Nadine and meets up with her for coffee. She tell Nadine that there is no chance she and Vince will ever get together, because Vince is gay, and she should just give up and stop trying to drive away her best friend's boyfriends. Nadine realizes Grace is right, and apologizes to Vince. Will realizes Grace helped, but doesn't know how. In the meantime, Karen takes a new job working as Jack's assistant, but they have so much fun in the office together that he can't get any work done and has to fire her. Karen goes back to work for Grace, ignoring the fact that she quit and pretending that she was just out at the store for 10 minutes.
154	8	"Saving Grace, Again"	James Burrows	Greg Malins	November 11, 2004	7008	11.96
155	9	"Saving Grace, Again"	James Burrows	Gail Lerner	November 18, 2004	7009	12.02
Part I: As Grace's dreaded wedding anniversary approaches, Will sets her up on a date with a great guy named Alan. Grace has a wonderful time, but when she gets home, there is a garbled message from Leo on her answering machine. Grace thinks that Leo wants to meet on the roof of the Peninsula Hotel for their anniversary like they originally planned, and she can't stop thinking about it. To get her mind off of it, Will plans a getaway for the two of them in the Berkshires. Grace says she's psyched to get out of the city and get Leo off her mind, but she takes the answering machine with her so she can listen the message some more. In the meantime, Karen and Jack set each other up on dates, but they both do a horrible job. Jack sets up Karen with her own gardener, while Karen sets up Jack with a closeted married man. They decide that no one is good enough for either of them, and they should just be a couple themselves and have sex on the side with other people. Part II: Up in the Berkshires, Will finds the answering machine in Grace's bag, and Grace admits that she's still torn about going to the Peninsula Hotel. Will convinces Grace that she shouldn't think about it anymore, but then worries that he pressured her into the decision and someday she'll wonder if Leo was there. Will runs back to the city to check the Peninsula Hotel for Leo, and Grace tracks him there. Grace says she appreciates Will taking care of her, but she knows she made the right decision. Jack finds Peter, the guy he remembers from the Cocoa Devil commercials who always said, "It's sinfully delicious." Jack puts Peter in an Out TV commercial, but Peter refuses to say his old line, finding it degrading. Jack gets desperate when Peter runs away, but Karen finds the Cocoa Devil and convinces him, with a story from her own past, that it's okay to be famous for something stupid.
156	10	"Queens for a Day"	James Burrows	Kirk J. Rudell	November 25, 2004	7010	8.10
157	11	"Queens for a Day"	James Burrows	Kirk J. Rudell	November 25, 2004	7011	8.10
As Thanksgiving approaches, and Will and Vince plan to bring together their respective "families" for the event, Vince warns Will that his mother never likes his boyfriends. To get a jump on Vince's mom liking him, Will takes her out shopping, but accidentally causes her to break her toe while trying on some very high heels. To make it up to her, Will decides to cook her usual big Italian Thanksgiving dinner, even though she spends the entire time trying to put him down. Vince's sister, Ro, admits to Jack that she's a lesbian and wants to break up with her fiancé. Jack tells Ro she should come out at Thanksgiving dinner, but Will, wanting everything to be perfect, convinces her to wait. Karen and Grace, who have both been single for a while and haven't had any recent sex, find themselves fighting over Vince's hot cousin Sal—who they later find out is only 16 years old. Vince constantly feels put down by his dad, even though the slights are only imagined. Finally, as dinner is served and Will is giving the toast, he can't take Vince's mom's bad-mouthing anymore, so he lets her have it, outing Ro and embarrassing Grace and Karen at the same time. He prepares to leave, but Vince's mom realizes how much Will loves her son, and asks him to stay.
158	12	"Christmas Break"	James Burrows	Bill Wrubel	December 9, 2004	7012	10.14
While at a holiday tea at Will's mother's house, Grace breaks one of Marilyn's treasured Lladro figurines, and hides the evidence under the couch. Will counsels Grace not to say anything, but Marilyn figures it out and lays a trap for Grace's conscience. Karen's step-daughter Olivia shows up for Christmas, and Karen bribes Jack to take care of her. Karen becomes jealous when Jack has a good time with Olivia and her friends, so she tries to hang out with the teens as well and embarrasses Olivia. Jack engineers a holiday reunion between the two women, who bond over how they used to tease Olivia's brother and how much they loved Stan.
159	13	"Board Games"	James Burrows	Sally Bradford	January 6, 2005	7013	10.10
Walker Inc. is the subject of a hostile takeover by a man named Scott Woolley, who is taking revenge for Karen using her boobs to win school president back in high school. Woolley get the board of directors to vote him in as CEO, but when he steps out of the room, Karen reminds all the directors of all the dirt that she has on them, and they vote her back into power. Grace and Jack see Vince at a grocery store while he's supposed to be at work, and initially think that he might be cheating on Will. The truth, however, is that Vince finally screwed up too many times as a cop, and was fired from the force. And he's not doing a very good job of keeping his new job at the grocery store either.
160	14	"Partners"	James Burrows	Alex Herschlag	January 13, 2005	7014	9.68
Will announces that he's up for partner at his firm and Vince admits that he got fired. Will's boss, Margot, has a dinner party for him and the other two partner candidates. Margot also invites Grace to dinner, saying that she has someone she wants to set up with Grace, but the someone turns out to be her own pathetic husband who just wants to be spanked. Vince goes to dinner as Will's date, but is even more depressed because he just got fired from another job as a security guard at a jewelry store. Will is torn between kissing Margot's ass to get the job as partner, and caring for his obviously depressed boyfriend. When he finally tells Margot he has to take Vince home, Margot gives him the job as partner anyway. At home, Vince says he doesn't want to be the guy that brings Will down, and they mutually decide to "take a break," even though Will realizes they're probably breaking up. Rosario is sick, and ends up in the hospital after having to have her tonsils out. Karen insists that Rosario is faking it, until she thinks Rosario has died, when she admits that she just didn't want to face the idea of perhaps losing her maid/friend.
161	15	"Bully Woolley"	James Burrows	Greg Malins	February 3, 2005	7015	9.99
Jack takes Will out dancing to help him get over his breakup with Vince, but Will is good when Jack ignores him and ends up going home with some other guy. Jack tries hard to make it up to Will, and tricks him into meeting him at a café where he promises to give him his full attention. Will is impressed when Patti Lupone, Jack's Broadway idol, shows up and sits next to them, and Jack manages to ignore her so that he can talk to Will. Scott Woolley makes a ridiculous second attempt to ruin Karen's life by trying to trick Grace into firing her, but Karen turns the tables on his silly ruse. Grace comforts a depressed Woolley, who realizes that he's actually in love with Karen and should be trying to date her instead of ruin her.
162	16	"Dance Cards and Greeting Cards"	James Burrows	Gail Lerner	February 10, 2005	7016	11.49
Karen goes to her country club Valentine's Day Ball to meet a blind date that she met online. She is surprised to find out that her blind date is Scott Woolley, but she agrees to hang out with him when he saves her from the ridicule of her nemesis, Beverley Leslie. When Karen realizes what serious feelings Woolley has for her, however, she quickly cuts him loose so as not to hurt him any more. When Will and Jack hear Beverley Leslie declare that two men will never dance together at this country club, they take it as a personal challenge, and encourage a middle-aged pair of lesbians to do the same. Grace, working alone in her office on Valentine's Day and suffering through a party being thrown upstairs, meets Nick, a handsome errant party guest with whom she shares a Valentine kiss.
163	17	"The Birds and the Bees"	James Burrows	Steve Gabriel	February 17, 2005	7017	9.93
Jack meets a sexy birdwatcher named Aaron because Aaron is obsessed with a bird on Karen's balcony. Jack is attracted by the cute wholesome nerd, but then Karen accidentally kills off the bird, and bribes Aaron with cash to keep him happy. Jack sees a darker side to Aaron... but still thinks he's really cute. Grace goes on a date with Nick and is worried that she'll sleep with him too quickly. She begs Will to come along and protect her from herself, but he ends up just sweating to death at a table in the restaurant near the fireplace.
164	18	"The Fabulous Baker Boy"	James Burrows	Kate Angelo	February 24, 2005	7019	9.91
Will takes on the task of firing Karen's pastry chef, but when he goes to give him the sack, they end up in the sack instead. Will is infatuated with his new sexy pastry boy, but when he finds out that his hottie is sleeping with both Karen and Rosario as well, he is quickly disillusioned. Grace's new guy, Nick, gives her a script he wrote to read and then pass along to Jack at OutTV. Grace is scared to read it, in case she doesn't like it, but she passes it along to Jack anyway. Jack meets with Nick, and admits to Nick that he didn't read it. When Nick gets nice, Jack passes the buck by saying that Grace didn't read it either. Nick is angry with Grace, and doesn't understand why she was afraid to read the script. Grace finally reads it, and even though she hates it, and tells Nick that much, she's pleased that she can separate the bad script from the guy who wrote it and still really like Nick. In the meantime, Jack also finally reads the script, and OutTV (with some drastic changes) decides to make it into a movie of the week. Both Grace and Nick are sad when it turns out that Nick will have to spend three months in Vancouver for the shooting of his movie.
165	19	"Sour Balls"	James Burrows	Laura Kightlinger	March 17, 2005	7018	8.45
Jack and Will buy a house in upstate New York, in a town called Middleborough that Jack swears is an up-and-coming gay getaway. When the two find out that Jack actually read about Middleborough, New Hampshire, they decide to abandon their new house, but the townspeople are actually excited to have gays moving in, because that will make property values go up and create more restaurants and shops in town. Jack and Will have to sneak away to avoid the banana bread and quiche gifts that the townspeople keep forcing upon them, as well as the school band that keeps marching by playing "We Are Family". Grace agrees to babysit Ellen's three kids, and Karen offers to help out, but Grace scoffs at Karen's ability to care for children. Karen's feelings are hurt and she's mad at Grace, but when Ellen decides that Grace isn't responsible enough to watch her kids without Will there, Karen comes to Grace's defense.
166	20	"The Blonde Leading the Blind"	James Burrows	Sonja Warfield	April 21, 2005	7020	8.05
Will convinces Grace to see his tough therapist, Dr. Georgia Keller, and is surprised when the two women not only hit it off, but Georgia offers to put Grace in her new book. Will decides to compete with Grace to get into the book, and the two friends end up telling Georgia that she can only use one of them. Georgia talks to Will and Grace together, and they both admit that they know that their relationship is unhealthy. Georgia assures them that they're just fine, and that they actually balance each other out, which is very comforting to them. In the meantime, Jack convinces Karen to get glasses, but when she tries them on for the first time and looks in the mirror, she thinks she looks old and freaks out. Jack convinces her to wear them, and Rosario assures her she looks great. Karen, who can finally see, decides that Rosario has been doing a terrible job of cleaning her apartment.
167	21	"It's a Dad, Dad, Dad, Dad World"	James Burrows	Jordana Arkin	May 5, 2005	7021	7.62
Karen drives Grace to her parents' house for Grace's dad's birthday, but Grace is horrified when her mother tells her that she's leaving her alone with her dad. Grace tries to talk to her dad and work on their relationship, but finally gets fed up with always being the butt of her father's jokes. Her father apologizes and tries to be the more serious and caring dad she wants, but can't help laughing at his daughter when she falls through a chair. Luckily, Grace is happy that her dad is at least trying to take an interest in her life instead of just her pitfalls. In the meantime, Karen entertains herself with Grace's dad's creepy friend, a dry-cleaner named Burt Wolfe. Back in the city, Jack sets up Will on a blind date—with an actual blind man. When Will's date feels his face and is bummed that he always gets set up with ugly guys because he's blind, Will gets all bent out of shape, which is when Jack runs out and admits that the whole date was being filmed for OutTV's version of Punk'd, called Pinked. Jack desperately tries to get Will to sign the release so that they can air his episode of Pinked, but Will refuses, saying that he's already self-conscious enough about his looks. To get Will to sign the release, Jack admits he's self-conscious about his looks too, and shows Will that he's wearing a girdle. That's when Will tells Jack that he's now been Pinked too.
168	22	"From Queer to Eternity"	James Burrows	Barry Langer	May 10, 2005	7022	5.42
Grace finds out from Will's mother that Will only left her $1,400 in his will, and wonders why she isn't worth more to him since he's pretty rich now. He admits that when he wrote that will, 15 years ago, it was all the money he had, and he hasn't been able to re-write it since then. Every time he looks at all the stuff he has, he just worries that he hasn't really accomplished anything or done good in the world, just become a rich corporate lawyer. Will quits his job. Jack finds out that another teacher has taken over his old acting class and is teaching the McFarland method. Karen uses a connection to get the new teacher a cool acting job so that Jack can have his class back, but once Jack starts teaching again he realizes he didn't really want to do it, and it feels like a step backwards now that he's a cable television executive.
169	23	"Friends with Benefits"	James Burrows	Tracy Poust & Jon Kinnally	May 19, 2005	7023	7.92
Will tries to be a writer, but he's really bad at it. A strange man named Malcolm pretends to be interested in Will's writing, but really, it's all just a mysterious ploy to get Will to be a lawyer again. Malcolm tells Will that his connections at the New Yorker didn't like his writing, but offers him a job as a lawyer running a charitable foundation for kids. Will happily accepts. An ex-boyfriend from college named Tom reappears in Grace's life and asks her to design his new hotel. She's excited to see him, until she realizes that he's now married, but that doesn't stop him from making a move on her. She stops him right away, not interested in being "the other woman". An obnoxious former child star is signed to host Jack's new talk show. He and Jack have a blow-out fight that is caught on camera, and the star quits, but Jack's boss says that Jack looks good on camera, so Jack gets the hosting job. Beverley Leslie threatens to sue Karen if she doesn't apologize for calling him a homosexual in public, but Karen just tricks the little man into outing himself.
170	24	"Kiss and Tell"	James Burrows	Gary Janetti	May 19, 2005	7024	7.92
Grace realizes that she has to quit her new job as the designer of Tom's hotel when things continue to be awkward between them. Tom visits Grace's office to apologize, but they end up in a lip-lock. Will starts his new job, and things get stranger and stranger until he demands that Malcolm tell him what's going on. Malcolm gives in and shows Will who his real boss is: Karen's not-so-dead husband Stanley. Just before Jack starts filming his new talk show, Jack Talk, his boss, Jamie, sees him and Karen fooling around together and decides that Karen would make a great co-host. Jack feels like Karen is stealing his spotlight and tells her to butt out, but he later apologizes. Karen says it's okay, this can be just his thing, and when Jamie finds out that Karen isn't, actually, a drag queen, he says he's not interested in her anyway.
