= Deborah McNulty =

American make-up artist

Deborah McNulty née Wolski (1955 – 6 November 2011) was a make-up artist. She won a Primetime Emmy Award in 2005 for her work on the HBO television series Deadwood.
