= Gregory Aull =

American technical director

Gregory Aull (born February 15, 1961, Brooklyn, New York, United States) is currently the American technical director for The Tonight Show with Jimmy Fallon on NBC. He has also worked in various technical capacities for Howard Stern, Saturday Night Live, Roseanne Barr and Conan O'Brien. For his efforts he has received 10 Emmy Award nominations including one win with Saturday Night Live.

== See also ==
- List of awards and nominations received by Saturday Night Live
