= Desmond Miller =

American hairstylist

- Born: Desmond Miller
- Citizenship: American
- Occupation: hairdresser
- Years active: 1995–present

Desmond Miller (born March 26, 1969), also known as Jackie Dee, is an American hairstylist. Miller was a recipient of the 2001 Prime Time Emmy Award for Outstanding Hairstylist for a Series for his work on MadTV. He has also performed as a dancer in Wigstock: The Movie in 1995, had one acting role on V.I.P. in 1999, and one acting role as a drag queen on MADtv in 2002.
