= Mad TV season 12 =

Season of television series

Mad TV
- Season 12
- No. of episodes: 22

Release
- Original network: Fox
- Original release: September 16, 2006 – May 19, 2007

Season chronology
- ← Previous; Season 11 Next → Season 13

The twelfth season of Mad TV, an American sketch comedy series, originally aired in the United States on the Fox Network between September 16, 2006, and May 19, 2007.

== Summary ==
For the first time since season four, MADtv saw not just a change in cast members, but also a change in format.

On the cast member front, Stephanie Weir (who actually left at the end of season ten, but was in a lot of pretaped season eleven sketches), Danielle Gaither, and Frank Caliendo were gone (with Gaither being fired by FOX while Weir and Caliendo left on their own accord). In their places, Frank Caeti and Nicole Randall Johnson were promoted to repertory status while Lisa Donovan (best known as LisaNova on YouTube) was hired, starting with the fourteenth episode of the season, then fired by season's end.

On the show's format front, the cold opening sketch was replaced by show announcer, Brian Fairlee, giving a preview of the sketches and guest stars that would appear in the episode. The sketches themselves became shorter, often shown in several parts so as to preserve the humor. A lot of political sketches centered on George W. Bush and his administration were nearly non-existent (barring the showing of a claymation short where Bush [voiced by Crista Flanagan] threatens to blackmail Santa Claus if Santa does not help him defeat his enemies). However, sketches with political undertones (such as "Steve Jobs' The iRack") and sketches that focused on the then-recent 2008 election, featuring Nicole Parker as Hillary Clinton and Keegan Michael-Key as Barack Obama would make up for the lack of Bush-related political satire. More focus was put on TV show and movie parodies, celebrity-based sketches, music video parodies, one-shot situational comedy sketches, and recurring character sketches. Animated sketches (mostly claymation, Monty Python-style cutout animation, and crude 2D Flash animation) also made a comeback after being phased out since season five (though seasons six, seven, eight, and nine had some semi-recurring and one-shot animated pieces, such as Shaq and the Super Lakers, Public Schoolhouse Rock, How Winona Ryder Stole Christmas, Chocolate Covered Peanuts, and Morbidly Obese Albert) with the appearance of the recurring sketch, "Celebrity Pets", several non-sequitur shorts, "Weekly News with Toby" (featuring Frank Caeti giving a first grader's point of view of current events) and a three-part sketch called, Cartoon Network's Rejected Superheroes.

Notable guest stars this season include: Dwayne "The Rock" Johnson, Eva Longoria, Seth MacFarlane (who, back when MADtv was starting out, was offered the chance to produce animated shorts for the show), the Los Angeles Kings, Tom Bergeron, Efren Ramirez, and Fred Willard.

== Opening montage ==
The 12th season had a new title sequence with shots of the performers as they prepared for the show. The screen divides into three different live-action shots. When the theme music starts, the announcer introduces each cast member alphabetically. After the last cast member is introduced, the whole cast is shown in a live-action shot. The music stops and the title sequence ends with the phrase "You are now watching Mad TV". The sequence also has a new announcer, Brian Fairlee.

== Cast ==
Repertory cast members

- Ike Barinholtz (22/22 episodes)
- Frank Caeti (19/22 episodes)
- Crista Flanagan (22/22 episodes)
- Nicole Randall Johnson (22/22 episodes)
- Keegan-Michael Key (22/22 episodes)
- Bobby Lee (22/22 episodes)
- Michael McDonald (22/22 episodes)
- Arden Myrin (22/22 episodes)
- Nicole Parker (22/22 episodes)
- Jordan Peele (22/22 episodes)

Featured cast members

- Lisa Donovan (4/22 episodes; first episode: February 17, 2007/last episode: May 5, 2007)

== Episodes ==
No. overall	No. in season	Title	Guest(s)	Original release date
267	1	"Episode 1"	Dwayne "The Rock" Johnson, Xzibit, Gene Simmons	September 16, 2006
Jeff Probst (McDonald) rings in the new season with Survivor: Cook Islands where team members of different races (Johnson, Key, Lee, Peele) square off, but only the white team succeeds; a two-part parody of High School Musical has high-schoolers (Caeti, Flanagan, Johnson, Lee, Parker, Peele) sing about their sordid secrets; Coach Hines (Key) accuses innocent team players (Caeti, Lee) of using steroids and ignores an obvious user; the first installment of Weekly Kid News with Toby talks about Mel Gibson's drug abuse and politically incorrect remarks about Jewish people; obsessive fan Larry Felmore (McDonald) defends his favorite celebrities when he overhears people (Barinholtz, Caeti, Flanagan, Johnson, Key, Myrin, Peele) making jokes about them in the concession line at a movie theater; Kim Jong-Il (Lee) sings a parody of Gnarls Barkley's "Crazy" about public figures more insane than he is; Ike Barinholtz throws a birthday party for Bobby Lee; Eugene Struthers (Key) interviews The Rock and Xzibit; Kevin Federline (Barinholtz) performs his rap debut.
268	2	"Episode 2"	Howie Mandel, Chingy	September 23, 2006
A parody of The Hills; a claymation episode of Real Police Videos shows a driver with an inordinate amount of illegal immigrants stuffed in his car; Maury Povich (McDonald) and Connie Chung (Lee) star in their own reality show; Ellen DeGeneres (Parker) becomes the new spokeswoman for adopting Iraqi children; Jordan Peele's romantic R&B song is really about playing video games; animated piece in which Suri Cruise pleas for help escaping from her father Tom; Larry King makes crude comments about Lost; on 24 with Bobby Lee, Howie Mandel teaches Lee how to be a better comedian; an ugly girl (Flanagan) with magic powers makes everyone (Johnson, Myrin) beautiful, but can't do the same to herself; The Weekly News With Toby touches on steroid abuse in baseball; Arden Myrin interviews celebrities at the Nip/Tuck premiere party; Ka-Son (Johnson) works as an airport security guard; Chingy performs with Overhand Left (Key, Peele).
269	3	"Episode 3"	John Cena, Martin Short	September 30, 2006
John Cena shows deleted scenes from The Marine with Bobby Lee as his love interest; Dane Cook (Barinholtz) performs rambling stand-up; superstitious knights Ty Gray (Peele) and Gray Hall (Key) are contestants on Deal or No Deal; a parody of The Dixie Chicks' (Flanagan, Myrin, Parker) "Not Ready To Make Nice" video has Natalie Maines (Flanagan) lobotomized for her anti-American views; Tyler Perry (Key), Eddie Murphy (Johnson), and Martin Lawrence (Peele) star in a new movie featuring black men in drag; Bobby Lee appears in a Korean soap opera; a strange waiter from Samoa (McDonald) disgusts a patron (Parker) with his ability to clean anything with his mouth; Weekly News with Toby focuses on The Pope's controversial statements about Muslims; a group of guys (Caeti, Key, Lee, McDonald) pick the wrong night to go to Hooters; Nicole Parker auditions for Martin Short, and ends up getting sexually harassed by him; a pop singer (Flanagan) collapses from exhaustion during a performance.
270	4	"Episode 4"	Nelly Furtado	November 4, 2006
The cast's musical number about peace and love gets out of hand; a three-part parody of Project Runway; stop-motion animated commercial for a terrorist Barbie doll; the hosts of Inside Looking Out (Parker, Peele) reminisce about their first meeting; a yoga teacher (Lee) is unable to film his routine at the beach thanks to an inconsiderate beach bum (Barinholtz); Billy (Lee) learns about the dangers of Internet sexual predators on this installment of Sesame Street; former presidential nominee John Kerry (McDonald) tries to clear the air about his "botched joke"; Nelly Furtado gets hounded by Eugene (Key); Weekly News with Toby talks about Michael J. Fox; Condoleezza Rice (Johnson) stars in a blaxploitation film; Jordan Peele introduces a Japanese pop group (Flanagan, Lee, Myrin).
271	5	"Episode 5"	Seth MacFarlane, Eva Longoria	November 11, 2006
A parody of Intervention has Bobby Lee coming to terms with his exhibitionism; Cartoon Network presents rejected cartoon pilots; a manager (McDonald) must deal with an insane prospective employee (Johnson) who threatens to play the race card if she's not hired; a music video parody of "Promiscuous" shows the price people pay for not practicing safe sex; Bobby Lee performs various martial arts moves; animated piece involving Madonna's adopted baby (voice of Peele) bragging about how rich he now is; an infomercial salesman (Barinholtz) pitches a violent way for blue-collar workers to own real estate; we go behind the scenes of Family Guy, where show creator, Seth MacFarlane shows what his series would have been like in live-action and with miscast voice actors (Barinholtz, Johnson, Key, Parker); Arnold Schwarzenegger (Barinholtz) causes trouble when he guest directs the show; Eugene Struthers (Key) interviews Eva Longoria; while promoting Levitrol, a man (Key) recollects having a traumatic confrontation with his doctor; Fox's teaser trailer for a new mystery series; animated short in which a preacher (voice of McDonald) denounces gay marriage and homosexuality, until he falls for a man; a rapper (Peele) who had recently been shot 37 times performs on stage while in a paralyzed state.
272	6	"Episode 6"	Matthew Broderick, Danny DeVito, Kristin Davis	November 18, 2006
Britney Spears (Parker) and Kevin Federline (Barinholtz) film themselves cooking Thanksgiving dinner; a rude driver (McDonald) mocks homeless people (Caeti, Key, Peele); Al Roker (Peele), Jennifer Love Hewitt (Myrin), and Kim Jong-Il (Lee) host Macy's Thanksgiving Day Parade; obsessive fan Larry Felmore (McDonald) continues to defend his favorite celebrities while watching movie trailers; a single mother (Parker) wishes for the days before she had a child in a commercial for the morning-after pill; Aaron Sorkin introduces an X-rated version of Studio 60 on the Sunset Strip featuring behind-the-scenes drama during a porno shoot; on 24 with Bobby Lee, Lee receives a check-up for SARS; on the first episode of Celebrity Pets, Mariah Carey's dog (voice of Peele) loves the good life with her, but hates her multi-octave singing voice; Eugene Struthers (Key) goes to a Deck the Halls junket; Rock 'N' Roll star Dax Strutter (Caeti) performs while making sexual moves on a pregnant woman (Parker) in front of her husband (Barinholtz).
273	7	"Episode 7"	TBA	November 25, 2006
Crista Flanagan is traumatized and bloody over buying a PlayStation 3; Infamous is remade several times; Coach Hines (Key) gets a surprise homecoming visit from a former high school football player (Peele); a brutal heat wave plagues the players (Barinholtz, Caeti) and announcers (Key, McDonald) at a PGA tournament; Tom Cruise's cat (voice of Flanagan) discusses life with her celebrity owner on this installment of Celebrity Pets; Julie Andrews (Parker) shows three alternate endings for The Sound of Music; Dane Cook (Barintholtz) deals with a heckler in the audience while performing his standup; while discussing his book If I Did It with Judith Regan (Parker), O.J. Simpson (Peele) is greeted by various passers-by (Caeti, McDonald, Key) who call him out on being an acquitted murderer; Bobby Lee's Korean soap opera character confronts his rival and reunites with his lost love; Weekly News with Toby touches on Hollywood divorces; Arden Myrin interviews celebrities at the premiere for Happy Feet.
274	8	"Episode 8"	TBA	December 9, 2006
Snoop Dogg (Key) clears the air about his recent troubles with the law, then frames Jordan Peele for his crimes; three Muslim extremists (Barinholtz, Caeti, Key) fail in their plans to protest against America; a man's (McDonald) robot hands cause trouble in the office; a music video parody of "SexyBack" centered on Sylvester Stallone's (Caeti) comeback in the new Rocky movie; on Celebrity Pets, Vince Vaughn's dog (voice of Key) reveals how Vaughn uses him to pick up women; Mel Gibson (McDonald) reveals revamped scenes for Apocalypto and thinly-veiled apologies for his anti-Semitic remarks; a parody for Domino's Pizza Fudge 'Ems features a disgusted pizza boy (Barinholtz) and a living turd visiting families; North Korea hires a loose-cannon scientist (Lee) to test missiles; Arden Myrin and Crista Flanagan interview celebrities at the Billboard Awards; Weekly News with Toby centers on Michael Richards' racially-charged Laugh Factory rant and the aftermath; a newlywed couple (McDonald, Parker) struggle to tell the story of how they met; an animated piece featuring Kid Rock (voice of Barinholtz) and Pamela Anderson's (voice of Flanagan) wedding and divorce on the cover of a tabloid; a parody of Flavor of Love has Flava Flav (Peele) and various animals as his potential girlfriends.
275	9	"Episode 9"	Jeff Probst	December 16, 2006
Mad TV cast members have a disastrous Secret Santa party; commercial parody for Tickle Me Elmo doll (voice of Caeti) that's suicidal and "emo"; Christmas partygoers (Barinholtz, Caeti, Flanagan, Lee, McDonald, Myrin, Parker) scare off an escaped convict (Key) by having an orgy; animated short in which Santa (voice of McDonald) is blackmailed into destroying George W. Bush's (voice of Flanagan) enemies; two Thais (Lee) review movies in a low-rent show called The Korean Movie Review Show; a gory holiday party turns into the newest installment of Saw; Maury Povich (McDonald) and Connie Chung (Lee) welcome The View's Joy Behar (Parker) and the pig from Charolette's Web; Tori McLachlan (Parker) sings a depressing Christmas song; animated short in which Al Gore (voice of McDonald) warns Frosty the Snowman (voice of Peele) that he will not survive global warming; Jeff Probst plugs his new CD of Survivor songs featuring duets with Queen Latifah (Johnson), Barry Gibb (McDonald), and Celine Dion (Parker); Luann Lockhart (Flanagan) performs some holiday standup.
276	10	"Episode 10"	Los Angeles Kings	January 6, 2007
Bobby Lee and Crista Flanagan struggle through their fast; a parody of My Chemical Romance's (Caeti) "Welcome to the Black Parade" video about Michael Richards' (McDonald) racist outbursts and the Internet being a new source of entertainment; The Game (Peele) promotes Post-It notes; The History Channel premieres its own sitcom about a king (McDonald) sent to the future and trying to adjust to modern life; a parody trailer for Dreamgirls mocks the film for being a formulaic clone of musical biopics and VH-1 documentaries; the newest Grand Theft Auto is staged in Kansas; Stuart Larkin (McDonald) wins a free shopping spree at a candy store; Arden Myrin uses her interviewing assignment on the Los Angeles Kings to find a boyfriend; folk singer Cat Stevens (Peele) hawks a new album featuring pro-terrorism songs; Jovan Muskatelle (Key) frantically reviews the most controversial events of 2006; a business meeting about a new product devolves into a conversation about whether or not gorillas are capable of learning martial arts.
277	11	"Episode 11"	Carmen Electra	January 20, 2007
Steve Jobs' (McDonald) new iPhone gives him godlike powers; on today's episode of Sesame Street, Big Bird (Peele) suffers from radiation poisoning thanks to Elmo's (Caeti) dirty bomb; Tiger Woods (Peele) showboats while competing in a golf tournament; two women (Flanagan, Myrin) cannot stop laughing at an office joke about being "coffee twins"; TiVo playlists of Tommy Lee, Tom Cruise, and George W. Bush; Carmen Electra is a special guest on The Korean Movie Review Show; on today's episode of the Discovery Kids Channel's Who'da Thunk?, Merlin Pebsworth (Caeti) explores the Internet and what happens when sexual predators like him are lured into a Dateline NBC sting; Lionel Richie (Key), Jeff Foxworthy (McDonald), and Jessica Simpson (Parker) are the guests of honor at a bar mitzvah; a parody of Medium where Bae Sung (Lee) helps Alison DuBois (Flanagan) speak to the dead; Weekly News with Toby centers on the feud between Donald Trump and Rosie O'Donnell; a black man (Johnson) pesters a white girl (Myrin) for her phone number at a fast food restaurant; a would-be suicide bomber's (Barinholtz) video will includes rants about overrated pop culture figures.
278	12	"Episode 12"	Shawne Merriman, Mary Lynn Rajskub	February 3, 2007
The MADtv cast and Shawne Merriman have their own Super Bowl game; a Scottish warlord (Peele) can't convince his men (Barinholtz, Caeti) that he was raped by the British; the Superstitious Knights (Key, Peele) perform victory dances to help the Chicago Bears win the Super Bowl; the news constantly obsesses over the smallest of things; Mofaz the Depressed Persian Tow Truck Man (McDonald) and Condoleezza Rice (Johnson) grouse about America's obsession with national security; Ike Barinholtz, Keegan-Michael Key, and Michael McDonald have a discussion about who will win the Super Bowl; Paula Abdul (Parker) dispels rumors of substance abuse; on 24 with Bobby Lee, Mary Lynn Rajskub freaks out after mistaking Lee for Masi Oka; Jeanne Bice (Parker) gives her nephew Adam (Barinholtz) outfit tips for the Super Bowl on QVC; a cheating couple (Caeti, Myrin) make out in a Toyota Yaris while showing off its new features.
279	13	"Episode 13"	Kate Walsh	February 10, 2007
The judges from American Idol (Johnson, McDonald, Parker) critique Bobby Lee and Frank Caeti's performances on the show; after The Montel Williams Show, Montel (Peele) suddenly starts rapping while walking to his dressing room; unaired openings of Law & Order features awkward discoveries of dead bodies and Kate Walsh hosting a disastrous kid's birthday treasure hunt in a messy backyard; the LAPD (Barinholtz) now sells piñatas shaped like minority suspects; Barack Obama (Key) overshadows a speech by Hillary Clinton (Parker); a couple (Parker, McDonald) gets splattered with bird droppings during a wedding proposal at an aviary; the Blind Kung-Fu Master (Lee) is sent to space to stop an alien princess (Flanagan) from ruling the universe; Bobby Lee asks Arden Myrin to be his wingman; Celebrity Pets focuses on Dick Cheney's disturbed hunting dog (voice of Key); Wendy Walker (Flanagan) fails to make a Valentine's Day-themed dish on Three Minute Meals.
280	14	"Episode 14"	TBA	February 17, 2007
Tim Gunn (McDonald) interviews audience members to see if any of them will be suitable to be on Project Runway; a parody of "The Sweet Escape" has Gwen Stefani (Parker) in love with East Asians and all they've contributed to society; the doctors from Grey's Anatomy (Flanagan, Johnson, Key, Lee, Myrin, Parker) summon Dr. Gregory House (McDonald) to cure a woman (Donovan) who's foaming at the mouth; Flavor Flav (Peele) recounts skewed versions of famous moments in African-American history, much to Sidney Poitier's (Key) chagrin; another episode of the Korean soap opera Attitudes and Feelings Both Desirable and Sometimes Secretive; Ellen DeGeneres (Parker) interviews Salma Hayek (Donovan); animated piece where Cupid's (voice of Key) attempt to make a love connection turns deadly when he uses hollow-point arrows; Ike Barinholtz's visit with Bobby Lee's parents turns nightmarish when the family creeps him out; Luann Lockhart (Flanagan) performs her standup at a laundromat. Featuring: Lisa Donovan Absent: Frank Caeti Notes: Lisa Donovan's first episode as a featured cast member.
281	15	"Episode 15"	Danny Bonaduce	February 24, 2007
Keegan-Michael Key and Arden Myrin open the show and get mugged by the crew; Forest Whitaker (Peele) raps about his many film roles and how he deserves an Oscar; a parody of Freedom Writers; obsessive fan Larry Felmore (McDonald) defends celebrities at a video rental store; a variety of award-winning actors (Barinholtz, Caeti, McDonald) and actresses (Lee, Myrin, Parker) interview each other on Oprah's (Johnson) Oscar Nomination Special; Danny Bonaduce hosts a special Oscar edition of The Lillian Verner Game Show with Renée Zellweger (Parker), Morgan Freeman (Peele), and Toshio Saeki (Lee) as contestants; Ike Barinholtz and Bobby Lee screen their Oscar-nominated movie; the Disney Girl (Parker) sings about her audition for a porno film; a trailer for a new animated film about penguins (voices of Barinholtz, Caeti, Key, McDonald, Peele) attacking polar bears. Featuring: Lisa Donovan
282	16	"Episode 16"	Rob Corddry	March 10, 2007
Kevin Federline (Barinholtz) shows off new Amway products while Britney Spears (Parker) is restrained Hannibal Lecter-style; a country singer (Peele) performs a song about Yao Ming (Lee); Steve Jobs' (McDonald) sales pitch for the iRack mirrors America's disastrous occupation of the similarly-named country; Heidi Klum (Flanagan) is miscast as a silent secret agent; Rob Corddry plays an employee who tells a fellow co-worker (Barinholtz) about his recent tryst with another co-worker (Peele); an ocean institute doctor (McDonald) freaks out when one of his sharks goes on a rampage on a Discovery Kids Shark Week show; psycho Catholic school coach Sandy Hines (Key) works at an ice cream parlor after being suspended for his violent antics; on Celebrity Pets, Lindsay Lohan's dog Chloe (voice of Flanagan) misses her master; blaxploitation parody in which Condoleezza Rice (Johnson) investigates why black people are being irradiated; a commercial for Glad bags portrays the announcer (Peele) wishing for a small device; a simple argument between a grandmother (Flanagan) and her granddaughter (Myrin) erupts into a brawl; an elderly woman (Johnson) annoys a video rental outlet employee (Key). Absent: Frank Caeti, Lisa Donovan
283	17	"Episode 17"	Edge	March 17, 2007
Arden Myrin and the Edge beat up a heckler; Rachael Ray (Parker) gets drunk during her restaurant outings; a soon-to-be-executed freedom fighter (Peele) is revealed to have been a willing victim of a gang rape by British soldiers (Barinholtz, Key); a girls' soccer coach (McDonald) must award everyone on his losing soccer team in the name of all-inclusiveness; the Edge guest stars in a new installment of Attitudes and Feelings Both Desirable and Sometimes Secretive; Darrell (Johnson) bothers another white girl (Flanagan) at a movie theater for her phone number; a newly married couple (McDonald, Parker) share bizarre stories with other married couples (Barinholtz, Caeti, Flanagan, Myrin) about how they met; the Jazzed for Crafts salesladies (Flanagan, Myrin) sell DVD crafts which catch the attention of a possible suitor (Caeti). Absent: Lisa Donovan
284	18	"Episode 18"	Tom Bergeron, Efren Ramirez	April 7, 2007
The Mayor of Cancún (Key) speaks out against drunk American college kids (Barinholtz, Caeti, Flanagan, Lee, Myrin, Peele) ruining his city during spring break; a commercial parody for the "Morning Before" pill; Krump Dancers Noodles (Peele) and Nippy (Flanagan) teach spring break revelers about the dangers of STDs; the Knobs (Barinholtz, Lee) imagine meeting their better halves (Flanagan, Myrin); celebrities (Barinholtz, Flanagan, Johnson, Key, Lee, Myrin, Parker, Peele) discuss their experiences smoking marijuana on VH-1's Best Weed Ever; skanky New Jersey teenagers (Johnson, Myrin, Parker) gab about their sex lives; Ike Barinholtz and Bobby Lee spend the day with a boy who's a part of the "Make-A-Wish Foundation"; Paris Hilton's pet kinkajou (voice of Key) replaces her chihuahua on this week's installment of Celebrity Pets; Tom Bergeron hosts a special spring-break edition of the Lillian Verner Game Show; Tyra Banks (Johnson) exposes prejudice towards Jews by disguising herself as one for the day; a dirty South rapper's (Peele) love life falls apart when he does not thank Jesus (McDonald) during an acceptance speech; a white girl (Myrin) meets her Korean (Lee) date's adoptive family (Flanagan, Caeti, McDonald). Absent: Lisa Donovan
285	19	"Episode 19"	Jamie Kennedy	April 14, 2007
Bobby Lee is presented the "Asian-American Hope for Dignity" award, until a montage showcases all of his various roles on the show; Dr. Phil (McDonald) uses HDTV to expose the lies his guests (Barinholtz, Myrin) tell until it backfires when Oprah (Johnson) comes on the show; a commercial parody for a new fruit drink contains an innuendo about date rape in college; when the LaMontroses (Parker, Peele) attend a therapy session, the therapist (Key) exposes their hidden racist attitudes; on 24 with Bobby Lee, the host spends the day with Jamie Kennedy; obsessive fan Larry Felmore (McDonald) defends his favorite sitcoms during a TV writing class; on Deal or No Deal, a man (Barinholtz) gets lambasted by his wife (Flanagan) for not taking the deal; on this week's Celebrity Pets, David Blaine's pitbull Houdini (voice of Key) reveals the magician's secrets; elderly womanizer Isador Kruskel (McDonald) from The 7 AM Condo Report tries speed dating; the Coffee Twins (Flanagan, Myrin) continue to laugh at their own lame jokes at the office. Absent: Frank Caeti, Lisa Donovan
286	20	"Episode 20"	Leah Remini, Michael Rapaport, Verne Troyer	April 28, 2007
Nicole Parker objects to Crista Flanagan, Lisa Donovan, Arden Myrin, and Nicole Randall Johnson acting out sexual fantasies for ratings; parody of Heroes trashes the show for being cliched and overrated; a family (Barinholtz, Donovan, McDonald) stages an intervention to stop their cousin (Caeti) from speaking in a stereotypically Italian voice, only to learn that his real voice is worse; while promoting his new album Reborn, Seal (Peele) is constantly interrupted by his shrill-voiced wife Heidi Klum (Flanagan); a hungover co-worker (Parker) running late for work delivers a poorly-produced PowerPoint presentation; Michael Rapaport plays Rhett Butler in three alternate endings of Gone with the Wind; Eugene Struthers (Key) delivers flowers to Leah Remini; E.R. & Famous has Kelly Pickler (Donovan), Mo'Nique (Johnson), Snoop Dog (Key), Kathy Griffin (Parker), and Verne Troyer as paramedics; Celebrity Pets features a former rescue dog (voice of Key) who's been adopted by American Pie trainwreck Tara Reid (voice of Myrin); after an officer (Key) pulls over a speeder (Myrin) searching for her missing son, he starts hitting on her. Featuring: Lisa Donovan
287	21	"Episode 21"	Carl Edwards, Tito Ortiz, Ben Donovan	May 5, 2007
Jorge (Key) is offended over Crista Flanagan, Jordan Peele, Arden Myrin, Ike Barinholtz, and Bobby Lee celebrating Cinco de Mayo the American way; the new season of Survivor has Christians (Caeti, Johnson), Jews (Barinholtz, Donovan), Muslims (Key), and Tom Cruise's (Flanagan) team of Scientologists pitted against each other; in a commercial for a new period-control pill, a husband (Caeti) wants to make love to his wife (Flanagan) more often; a parody of Scrubs mocks the show's wild shifts between wacky farce and sappy medical drama; Tito Ortiz appears in a commercial promoting a new deodorant with Bobby Lee and Jordan Peele; Larry King reviews House; a Hillary Clinton supporter (Donovan) and a Barack Obama supporter (Peele) argue over who's the better 2008 candidate; Tank (Lee) faces competition from Carl Edwards while trying to pick up girls (Donovan, Johnson); VH-1 Best Mom Ever features celebrities (Barinholtz, Lee, Myrin, Parker, Peele) looking back on how their mothers treated them; video footage of Britney Spears (Parker) and Kevin Federline (Barinholtz) at their divorce settlement meeting; on another installment of Who'da Thunk?, Merlin Pebsworth (Caeti) teaches kids about good and bad mushrooms; Nicole Parker introduces sleazy female rapper Sissy Felony Jackson (Johnson). Featuring: Lisa Donovan Notes: Lisa Donovan's last episode as a featured cast member.
288	22	"Episode 22"	Fred Willard	May 19, 2007
Jordan Peele, Crista Flanagan, Ike Barinholtz, Frank Caeti, and Nicole Randall Johnson treat the season finale as if it was a cliffhanger; the Blind Kung Fu Master (Lee) tries to save a princess (Myrin) from an evil sorcerer (Key); King Henry (McDonald) finds work as a fast-food employee on The King Henry Show; Coach Hines (Key) threatens prom attendees and gets drunk; Fred Willard plays a sarcastic preacher who hosts a roast for Jesus Christ; Tori McLachlan (Parker) sings a depressing song about life after high school; a parody of I Shouldn't Be Alive features different re-enactments of the same story; Astroman (Barinholtz) confronts his rival Killbrain the Fury (Peele) at a car dealership; on the final installment of Celebrity Pets, Kim Jong-Il's dog (voice of Lee) dispels rumors about the dictator; the Jazzed for Crafts girls (Flanagan, Myrin) flirt with a video store employee (Peele). Notes: Ike Barinholtz, Frank Caeti and Nicole Randall Johnson's last episode as cast members.

== Home release ==
When HBO Max streamed this series, the only episode missing was episode 4. The versions shown on Howdy and Tubi omit episode 4 as well, but also don't have episodes 6 and 7.
