= Mad TV season 11 =

Season of television series

Mad TV
- Season 11
- No. of episodes: 22

Release
- Original network: Fox
- Original release: September 17, 2005 – May 20, 2006

Season chronology
- ← Previous; Season 10 Next → Season 12

The eleventh season of Mad TV, an American sketch comedy series, originally aired in the United States on the Fox Network between September 17, 2005, and May 20, 2006.

== Summary ==
With Spencer Kayden, Ron Pederson, Aries Spears, and Paul Vogt gone from the cast, season eleven saw more changes to the show's cast (Stephnie Weir had also left the show, but was still credited as a cast member. The reason behind this was that Weir agreed to appear in four new episodes' worth of material, which are scattered throughout the season, technically making this her final season). Because of FOX's cast budget cuts, the only new cast members hired were Arden Myrin (who was immediately hired as a repertory member and, coincidentally, unsuccessfully auditioned to be on MADtv's rival show, Saturday Night Live) and featured players Frank Caeti (who resembled Frank Caliendo—a fact that was mentioned and mocked in the season premiere—and did impressions just like him) and Nicole Randall Johnson (marking this the first time in MADtv history to have more than one African-American female cast member, as Gaither was kept). Also, with the exception of Michael McDonald and Stephnie Weir, the majority of cast members in this season were born in the 1970s (some of which have birth years after Saturday Night Live's premiere in 1975) and were hired in the 2000s, making this the youngest cast in the show's history.

Notable celebrity appearances this season include: Pamela Anderson (who hosted the show's 250th episode, is one of many celebrities who not only hosted Saturday Night Live, but also cameoed on MADtv, and was lampooned by both shows fairly frequently), Jeff Garlin, Alyson Hannigan, Neil Patrick Harris, Jaime Pressly, Michael Rapaport, John Cena, Jeff Probst, Pauly Shore, Fred Willard, Christopher Meloni, Louie Anderson, and Jason Mraz.

== Opening montage ==
The title sequence opens with the Mad TV logo appearing against the skyline of Los Angeles. The theme song, performed by the hip-hop group Heavy D & the Boyz, begins and an announcer introduces each repertory cast member alphabetically, followed by the featured cast. The screen dissolves into three live-action clips of an individual cast member, then the three screens multiply until they fill the entire screen. Then all of the multiple clips flip over and displays another clip of the same cast member. As the multiple clips are reduced to one clip, a still color photo of the cast member is superimposed on the screen with his/her name appearing in caption over the photo. When the last cast member/guest is introduced, the music stops and the title sequence ends with the phrase "You are now watching Mad TV."

== Cast ==
Repertory cast members

- Ike Barinholtz (22/22 episodes)
- Frank Caliendo (19/22 episodes)
- Crista Flanagan (20/22 episodes)
- Daniele Gaither (21/22 episodes)
- Keegan-Michael Key (22/22 episodes)
- Bobby Lee (22/22 episodes)
- Michael McDonald (21/22 episodes)
- Arden Myrin (19/22 episodes)
- Nicole Parker (22/22 episodes)
- Jordan Peele (22/22 episodes)
- Stephnie Weir (9/22 episodes; last episode: May 6, 2006)

Featured cast members

- Frank Caeti (15/22 episodes)
- Nicole Randall Johnson (13/22 episodes)

== Episodes ==
No. overall	No. in season	Title	Guest(s)	Original release date
245	1	"Episode 1"	OK Go	September 17, 2005
Michael McDonald receives an angry letter from a fan; Ike Barinholtz and Bobby Lee conduct red-carpet interviews at the Mad TV season 11 premiere; Jessica Simpson (Parker) sings about the horrible film remakes of classic TV shows; a parody of House in which Dr. House (McDonald) pops Vicodin and cruelly treats a dying marriage counselor (Caeti); Mrs. Campbell (Weir) robs a saleslady (Flanagan) of the chance to make a sale by showing a couple (Caeti, Parker) a better home; Morgan Freeman (Peele) follows up March of the Penguins with a film about the animals in his backyard; nerdy craft ladies (Flanagan, Myrin) sell Popsicle houses at a NHL hockey ring; a new Paramount Pictures thriller called The Psychiatrist is packed with unlikely stars (Barinholtz, Caliendo, Flanagan, Parker); OK Go performs "A Million Ways." Featuring: Frank Caeti, Nicole Randall Johnson Notes: Arden Myrin's first episode as a cast member. Frank Caeti and Nicole Randall Johnson's first episode as featured cast members.
246	2	"Episode 2"	TBA	September 24, 2005
Rafael Palmeiro (Barinholtz) promotes steroids for Little Leaguers; George W. Bush (Caliendo) pays tribute to Gilligan's Island; a parody of Wedding Crashers featuring dictators Fidel Castro (Barinholtz) and Kim Jong-Il (Lee); Isador Kruskel (McDonald) from The 7AM Condo Report hosts his own show, The Silver Fox; a farmer (McDonald) feeds the clucking, hen-like hosts (Flanagan, Johnson, Myrin, Parker, Weir) of The View; Tank (Lee) hits on a girl (Myrin) at an arcade; Nicole Parker and Bobby Lee interview celebrities at the Emmy gala; Coldplay's Chris Martin (McDonald) sings about being the greatest musician ever; two krump dancers (Flanagan, Peele) demonstrate their violent dance moves at an elementary school; Rosa Parks (Gaither) is the newest celebrity to be "honored" on a Comedy Central roast. Featuring: Frank Caeti, Nicole Randall Johnson
247	3	"Episode 3"	Eric Balfour, Pauly Shore, The Dandy Warhols	October 1, 2005
Aging rockers Mick Jagger (Barinholtz) and Keith Richards (Key) star as the undead in a new horror film; Bobby Lee introduces Kanye West (Peele), who is still upset at George W. Bush's slow reaction to Katrina; Ike Barinholtz learns how to be an effective actor from Eric Balfour; on Fox NFL Sunday, Jillian Barberie (Myrin) shows her goodies to the commentators (Barinholtz, Caeti, Caliendo, Peele); on 24 with Bobby Lee, Lee finds himself dealing with fellow cast member Jordan Peele; R. Kelly's (Peele) favorite cereal goes missing in a three-part parody of the urban opera Trapped in the Closet; Angela Wright (Weir) interviews eighth graders (Caliendo, Flanagan, Gaither, Lee, Myrin, Parker, Peele); a group of intellectuals (Balfour, Barinholtz, Myrin, Parker) share their thoughts on the world; George W. Bush (Caliendo) delivers a speech; in a promo for the new TV drama Commander in Chief, an announcer (Caliendo) keeps cracking up over the thought of a woman being U.S. President; The Dandy Warhols perform "Smoke It." Featuring: Frank Caeti Absent: Nicole Randall Johnson, Michael McDonald
248	4	"Episode 4"	Fred Willard	November 5, 2005
Commercial parody for Apple's latest "iPod"-style product: the iPad for women on their periods; John Madden (Caliendo) nitpicks the comedy stylings of Ellen DeGeneres (Parker) on a parody of The Ellen DeGeneres Show; Fred Willard appears as a shady salesman trying to trick Mad TV cast members into promoting his products throughout the show; a neighborhood watch meeting gets out of hand; a visually-impaired martial arts sensei (Lee) prevents a Wild West prostitute (Parker) from being raped by outlaws (Barinholtz, Key); Dorothy Lanier (Weir) hosts the Hurricane Katrina Disaster Telethon; a tape recorder records a baby's (Caeti) first steps while the parents (Barinholtz, Parker) aren't looking; Ike Barinholtz introduces bizarre viral videos over the Internet in a new sketch called on/tHe/DoWnLoaD. Featuring: Frank Caeti Absent: Nicole Randall Johnson
249	5	"Episode 5"	Pamela Anderson	November 12, 2005
A coffee addict (Weir) crashes hard after taking sleeping pills; Ike Barinholtz introduces his hot grandmother (Pamela Anderson) to Jordan Peele and Bobby Lee; the LaMontroses from Inside Looking Out (Parker, Peele) sing at a nightclub; the Abercrombie & Fitch employees (Barinholtz, McDonald, Peele) think they spot a shoplifter (Key); a Wheel of Fortune parody featuring Pamela Anderson as a contestant who gets preferential treatment from Pat Sajak (Barinholtz); a televangelist-turned-car salesman (Caeti) helps a couple (Barinholtz, Myrin) find a new car; George W. Bush (Caliendo) hosts his own late-night talk show; on a modern-day episode of Sanford and Son, Fred (Peele) loots a Katrina-ravaged New Orleans and nearly gets mugged by Asian gangsters (Lee). Featuring: Frank Caeti Absent: Nicole Randall Johnson
250	6	"Episode 6"	Christopher Meloni	November 19, 2005
A parody of Ghost Whisperer has wandering spirits (Caliendo, Key) ogling Jennifer Love Hewitt's (Myrin) breasts; every time Christopher Meloni speaks, the dramatic sound effect from Law & Order plays; spoofs of the "Only Vegas" commercials show a man (Barinholtz) doing things he can only get away with in Vegas, like contaminating the buffet and going to a Celine Dion concert; Jillian Barberie (Myrin) reveals to the commentators of Fox NFL Sunday (Barinholtz, Caliendo, Caeti, Peele) that she's already in a relationship with a guy (Key); Dot (Weir) and her father (McDonald) star in a Thanksgiving play; a black girl (Johnson) joins an all-white-girl summer camp; Tank (Lee) plots to escape from juvenile hall in a loose parody of Prison Break; William Shatner (Caliendo) plugs a Native American-themed casino; Christopher Meloni plays a neighbor who gets into an argument with a loose cannon (McDonald) in another neighborhood watch meeting; a little boy (Peele) pesters his friend's parents (McDonald, Myrin) over an Xbox; another installment of on/tHe/DoWnLoaD. Featuring: Frank Caeti, Nicole Randall Johnson
251	7	"Episode 7"	John Cena	November 26, 2005
Tara Reid (Myrin) continues her cancelled reality show Taradise in war-torn Iraq; Arden Myrin shows John Cena how much of a wrestling fan she is; William Shatner (Caliendo) teaches his Boston Legal co-stars (McDonald, Parker) how to be Emmy-winning actors; the Jazzed for Crafts girls (Flanagan, Myrin) sell Popsicle stick art to a sleazy, white-trash man (McDonald) at a monster truck rally; Marvin Tikvah (McDonald) searches for a star; Coach Hines (Key) recklessly drives the school bus as he threatens his students and hits on a teacher (Gaither) at the same time; on 24 with Bobby Lee, John Cena regrets spending the day with Lee; the Knobs (Barinholtz, Lee) tell wise-cracking jokes and do bad celebrity impressions to customers (Caeti, Key, Myrin, Peele); another installment of on/tHe/DoWnLoaD. Featuring: Frank Caeti, Nicole Randall Johnson Absent: Stephnie Weir
252	8	"Episode 8"	Jeff Garlin	December 10, 2005
George W. Bush (Caliendo) raps with the Black Eyed Peas (Key, Lee, Parker, Peele) about the failures and scandals of his administration; Britney Spears (Parker) and Kevin Federline (Barinholtz) clear the air about their much-publicized life; Oprah Winfrey (Johnson), Ellen DeGeneres (Parker), Dr. Phil (McDonald), Tyra Banks (Gaither), and WWE all share the same studio audience; Mofaz (McDonald) comforts a reluctant new father (Barinholtz) while at the hospital; a parody of Sesame Street in which Big Bird (Peele) gets the bird flu; Ike Barinholtz and Bobby Lee conduct interviews of celebrities at the Billboard Music Awards; Jeff Garlin plays the temporary new host of the Lillian Verner Game Show and is later interviewed by Eugene Struthers (Key); a dysfunctional family (Caeti, Caliendo, Flanagan, McDonald, Myrin, Parker) is serenaded by caroling rappers (Gaither, Johnson, Key, Peele) at Fuddermuckers. Featuring: Frank Caeti, Nicole Randall Johnson
253	9	"Episode 9"	Neil Patrick Harris	December 17, 2005
Movie trailer for Memoirs of a Geisha derides the movie for being a pretentious Cinderella story with a Japanese prostitute (Lee); Neil Patrick Harris' monologue has various pop-up ads for various Fox programs constantly appearing; QVC Quacker Factory promotes their new Christmas attire; Stuart Larkin (McDonald) visits a mall Santa (Caeti); Sean Gidcomb (McDonald) retires and introduces his employees (Myrin, Weir) to his replacement (Neil Patrick Harris); on Inside Looking Out, the LaMantroses (Peele, Parker) sing "Kwanzmas Carols" at a nightclub; Denise (Flanagan) and Krista (Myrin) meet twin brothers (Caliendo, Caeti) while selling crafts at a rodeo; a Christmas edition of The Silver Fox. Featuring: Frank Caeti, Nicole Randall Johnson
254	10	"Episode 10"	Michael Rapaport	January 7, 2006
A look at Action 5 News' large anchor team (Barinholtz, Caliendo, Flanagan, Gaither, Key, Lee, McDonald, Myrin, Peele); Katie Holmes (Parker) feels trapped in her relationship with Tom Cruise; Bae Sung (Lee) annoys John Madden (Caliendo) and Al Michaels (Caliendo) while refereeing a football game; the Superstitious Knights (Key, Peele) break hexes at a casino; a parody of Laguna Beach; the Blind Kung Fu Master (Lee) tries to save an old woman (Gaither) from jive-talking muggers (Barinholtz, Peele); Michael Rapaport stars in a gritty Abraham Lincoln bioseries on HBO; Fox promotes a new series that follows the trend of shows with one word titles; the author of a home remedy book (McDonald) lies his way through his sales pitch during an infomercial; Steven Cragg helps make a wish come true for a woman's elderly uncle -- with disastrous results. Featuring: Frank Caeti Absent: Nicole Randall Johnson, Stephnie Weir
255	11	"Episode 11"	TBA	January 14, 2006
The Disney girl (Parker) sings about her wonderfully normal day on the bad side of town; Jovan Muskatelle (Key) reviews the events of 2005; George W. Bush (Caliendo) promises to make 2006 a better year; a celebrity-obsessed fan (McDonald) objects to comments his co-workers (Flanagan, Gaither, Key, Peele) make about today's stars (Barinholtz, Parker); Ike Barinholtz and Bobby Lee conduct red-carpet interviews at the People's Choice Awards; a parody of Curb Your Enthusiasm has Larry David (McDonald) saying the wrong thing all the time; Krump dancers Noodles (Peele) and Nippy (Flanagan) teach retirement home residents (Myrin) to dance; Steven Cragg tries to make black friends through song; Paula Zahn (Parker) welcomes John Madden (Caliendo) to her show. Absent: Frank Caeti, Nicole Randall Johnson, Stephnie Weir
256	12	"Episode 12"	TBA	January 28, 2006
Hilary Duff (Myrin) sings about how she (and other stars like her) becomes anorexic to stay in the spotlight; Reese Witherspoon (Myrin) presents deleted footage from her film Walk the Line; Montel Williams (Peele) gets high while interviewing an abuse victim (Parker); Larry King makes lewd comments in his review of Deadwood; Ike Barinholtz and Bobby Lee teach Jordan Peele how to drive; a parody of Grey's Anatomy has personal drama get in the way of medical duty; nervous comic Luann Lockhart (Flanagan) performs her stand-up routine; a man (Key) has trouble getting his cable back on due to the poor customer service from Ka-Son (Johnson); a recently-divorced man (McDonald) has a mental breakdown while throwing a garage sale. Featuring: Nicole Randall Johnson Absent: Frank Caeti, Stephnie Weir
257	13	"Episode 13"	Jaime Pressly	February 4, 2006
A parody music video featuring Snoop Dogg (Key) rapping to pee-wee football players about the perks of being an athlete; Bobby Lee thinks that Jaime Pressly is related to Elvis Presley due to having a similar last name; the gang of Fox NFL Sunday (Barinholtz, Caeti, Caliendo, Myrin, Peele) invite Terrell Owens (Key) to their last episode; Queen Latifah (Johnson) stars in new comedy movies similar to Taxi and Last Holiday; new Valentine's Day clothing is featured on QVC Quacker Factory; Tank (Lee) hits on girls at a Super Bowl tailgate party; Jaime Pressly stars as Hillary Clinton in a political parody of My Name Is Earl; Marvin Tikvah (McDonald) continues his Search for a Star contest; Ka-Son (Johnson) annoys a man (Barinholtz) trying to buy Valentine's Day gifts for his girlfriend and his Mom; Steven Cragg and his friends go against their sons in a game of football. Featuring: Frank Caeti, Nicole Randall Johnson Absent: Stephnie Weir
258	14	"Episode 14"	Alyson Hannigan, Jeff Probst	February 18, 2006
Morgan Freeman (Peele) recounts the first black man (Key) to drown while playing water polo; Jordan Peele opens the show with a subliminal message; Jeff Probst hosts an episode of The Lillian Verner Game Show and is later mistaken for Matthew Fox by Eugene Struthers (Key); two thugs (Key, Peele) reveal their romantic feelings for each other during a violent confrontation; Ike Barinholtz and Bobby Lee go out on a double date with cast members Crista Flanagan and Arden Myrin; Alyson Hannigan gets krump lessons from Noodles (Peele) and Nippy (Flanagan); George W. Bush (Caliendo) answers questions from the audience. Featuring: Nicole Randall Johnson Absent: Frank Caeti, Stephnie Weir
259	15	"Episode 15"	Jason Mraz	March 4, 2006
Emma Thompson (Parker) and Jeremy Irons (McDonald) star in Fart Camp; Jovan Muskatelle (Key) raves about Oscar-nominated movies during a newscast; James Blunt (Parker) appears topless and narcissistic in a parody of "You're Beautiful"; Donald Trump (Caliendo) buys out the neighborhood on another installment of Sesame Street; Ike Barinholtz and Bobby Lee frighten moviegoers with their lewd actions; a new installment of Laguna Beach features Jason Mraz performing at a dolphins' benefit; Marvin Tikvah (McDonald) announces the winner for his Search for a Star contest; Jason Mraz performs "Geek in the Pink." Absent: Frank Caeti, Nicole Randall Johnson, Stephnie Weir
260	16	"Episode 16"	John Cho, Louie Anderson	March 18, 2006
Brokeback Mountain sequel has cowgirls (Parker, Flanagan) in love and their husbands (Barinholtz, Key) watching; Nicole Parker recreates her recent breakup; on 24 with Bobby Lee, Lee trains with John Cho for a role in an upcoming movie; commercial parody features the "best" of George Clooney's screenwriting; Maury Povich (McDonald) and Connie Chung (Lee) confuse their interviewees (Flanagan, Key) on Weekends with Maury and Connie; a music video from Ashlee Simpson (Parker) about being a loser in the music biz; John Cho briefly fills in for Bobby Lee in a Bae Sung segment; singers Candy (Parker) and Tyler Matsumoto (Lee) sing about Hollywood; feuding superheroes Astroman (Barinholtz) and Killbrain the Fury (Peele) cross paths at a local bistro; Steven Cragg shows how to be a Good Samaritan. Absent: Frank Caeti, Frank Caliendo, Daniele Gaither, Nicole Randall Johnson, Arden Myrin, Stephnie Weir
261	17	"Episode 17"	John Leguizamo, Queen Latifah, Ray Romano	April 8, 2006
A lonely wife (Parker) sleeps with the Hamburger Helper Hand (voice of Key); Michael McDonald shows off his new adopted daughter; deadpan sociopath Yvonne Criddle (Gaither) freely admits she threatened to kill a man (Key) for taking her parking spot; the Blind Kung Fu Master (Lee) meets his equally visually challenged nemesis (Caliendo); lesbians (Flanagan, Gaither) think that a new lover (McDonald) of their friend (Myrin) is actually a man in drag; Eugene Struthers (Key) interviews the cast of Ice Age: The Meltdown; an innocent conga line at a wedding turns into a never-ending chain of people (Barinholtz, Flanagan, Gaither, Johnson, Key, Lee, McDonald, Myrin, Parker, Peele); three shoe store women (Flanagan, Johnson, Myrin) try to express their personal opinions to other people (Barinholtz, Parker) but they can't open it up to it; show writer Steven Cragg shows off his zombie party sketch. Featuring: Nicole Randall Johnson Absent: Frank Caeti, Stephnie Weir
262	18	"Episode 18"	TBA	April 15, 2006
Bo Bice (Barinholtz) promotes his new album of similar-sounding songs; Morgan Freeman (Peele) stars in a sitcom based on Everybody Hates Chris; a bachelor party stripper (Flanagan) is revealed to be married, pregnant, and underage by her husband/manager (McDonald); on 60 Minutes, Ed Bradley (Peele) interviews the friends and family members (Flanagan, McDonald, Myrin) of an obnoxious man (Caeti) who drowned during a booze cruise and Andy Rooney (Caliendo) complains about cereal boxes; a sketch about fighting Mexicans is interrupted by FOX's network censor (Peele) who goes over what Ike Barinholtz and Michael McDonald can and can't say and do; Ike Barinholtz and Bobby Lee take Jordan Peele to the Playboy mansion for his birthday; a restaurant hostess (Flanagan) is determined to seat her customers (Gaither, Peele) despite being disabled; a perky teen (Myrin) joins a fraternity keg party; Steven Cragg spends some quality time with his son. Featuring: Frank Caeti Absent: Nicole Randall Johnson, Stephnie Weir
263	19	"Episode 19"	TBA	April 29, 2006
In a parody of The Jeffersons, Mr. Bentley (McDonald) is deported and Florence (Gaither) is replaced by illegal Mexican workers that George (Key) hired; babies Joey (Caeti) and Simon (Lee) perform in front of the camera when their mothers (Flanagan, Parker) aren't looking; Coach Hines (Key) whips the cast of Oliver Twist (Caeti, Lee, Peele) into shape; two stranded men (Barinholtz, McDonald) trying to fix their flashlights get in trouble with police officers (Lee, Peele) who think they are masturbating in public; Ka-Son (Johnson) becomes a nightclub security guard; Stuart Larkin (McDonald) gets a big brother (Key); the Knobs (Barinholtz, Lee) are invited to a party by their business neighbors (Caeti, Key); a parody of Medium where Alison DuBois (Flanagan) can't get anyone to believe her about her death premonitions. Featuring: Frank Caeti, Nicole Randall Johnson Absent: Frank Caliendo, Arden Myrin, Stephnie Weir
264	20	"Episode 20"	TBA	May 6, 2006
Maury Povich (McDonald) and Connie Chung (Lee) interview and confuse an Iraqi general (Key) and a stem cell research expert (Myrin) in another installment of Weekends with Maury and Connie; Nicole Parker shows video footage of herself as an awkward teen; Dr. Kylie Johnson (Weir) is sent to court for her dubious medical practices; technical gaffes and a hard-to-understand announcer plague the taping of a morning show in North Dakota; Candy (Parker) and Tyler Matsumoto (Lee) send their love to the troops in a song; Ike Barinholtz and Bobby Lee go club hopping; an office woman (Weir) talks about her new boyfriend to her co-workers (Myrin, Parker). Absent: Frank Caeti, Frank Caliendo, Crista Flanagan, Nicole Randall Johnson Notes: Stephnie Weir's last episode as a cast member.
265	21	"Episode 21"	Kurt Busch	May 13, 2006
George W. Bush (Caliendo), Randy Jackson (Johnson), and William Shatner (Caliendo) speak at a college graduation ceremony in a three-part sketch; TV Land shows a clip from the first video game awards show in the 1970s, featuring games like Pong and Asteroids; Ike Barinholtz and Bobby Lee go NASCAR racing with Kurt Busch; Mofaz (McDonald) has a conversation with another Persian man (Key), unaware that the truck is bugged by the FBI (Caeti, Caliendo); metal shop workers (Barinholtz, Caeti, Key, Lee, Peele) must keep from getting injured after their boss (Caliendo) announces a pizza party for staying nearly injury-free for 1000 days; in a Steven Cragg short film, Cragg pulls off poorly executed practical jokes. Featuring: Frank Caeti, Nicole Randall Johnson Absent: Crista Flanagan
266	22	"Episode 22"	TBA	May 20, 2006
Two teens (Caeti, Parker) and their teacher (Gaither) accidentally go back in time in a parody of Land of the Lost; Ike Barinholtz and Jordan Peele freshen themselves up for the season's wrap party; an employee (McDonald) gets really frisky toward female employees (Flanagan, Johnson, Myrin, Parker) while showing off baby pictures; a cooking show host (Flanagan) screws up making a tuna sandwich in under three minutes on "3 Minute Meal;" a Wiggles-esque kids show called "The Ring-A-Rounds" teaches kids the light side of distressing adult issues; a parody of The Sopranos has Bae Sung (Lee) ground up into hamburger meat after a mob deal gone bad; two caretakers (Gaither, Johnson) are too permissive in caring for their children while at the park. Featuring: Frank Caeti, Nicole Randall Johnson Notes: Frank Caliendo and Daniele Gaither's last episode as cast members.

== Home release ==
Season eleven was available on HBO Max and is now available on Howdy and Tubi. All three streaming services have this season, as well as seasons 13 and 14, as the only three with every episode available.
