= Mad TV season 14 =

Season of television series

Mad TV
- Season 14
- Digital purchase image
- No. of episodes: 17

Release
- Original network: Fox
- Original release: September 13, 2008 – May 16, 2009

Season chronology
- ← Previous; Season 13 Next → Season 15

The fourteenth season of Mad TV, an American sketch comedy series, originally aired in the United States on the Fox Network between September 13, 2008, and May 16, 2009.

== Summary ==
This season saw some major changes to the cast. Featured players Daheli Hall, Dan Oster, and Anjelah Johnson did not return, while longtime cast members Jordan Peele and Michael McDonald left, though McDonald stayed on this season as a contributing writer and sketch director. New feature players for this season included comedian Matt Braunger, Erica Ash (from Logo's The Big Gay Sketch Show), stage actress Lauren Pritchard, and impressionist Eric Price. The show's format stayed largely unchanged, though the show's humor was back in full force after suffering through last season's changes in format and the hiatus brought on by the WGA strike.

MADtv also saw a change in timeslot. Between January 17, 2009, and February 21, 2009, the show was moved from its 11:00pm time slot to midnight on FOX affiliates and aired 30-minute reruns of their episodes that have previously aired from September to December 2008. Meanwhile, the show that preceded MADtv (Talkshow with Spike Feresten) was moved to the 11pm time slot and expanded to an hour.

The show's format and set also saw major changes. Instead of filming sketches before a live audience, all of the sketches were now pre-recorded and shown to the audience. The set also got a complete overhaul from its standard audience bleachers and stage setup to a dinner theater-style set up with a video monitor, a format that would stay with the show when it was temporarily revived on The CW in 2016.

In November 2008, it was announced that Mad TV would be cancelled at the end of the 2008–2009 season. Despite rumors that MADtv would continue as a cable show, nothing came of the show being revived (barring a similar, animated sketch series on Cartoon Network called MAD that aired from 2010 to 2013 and MADtv's limited-run reboot on The CW in 2016).

Notable guest stars for this season include: Jerry O'Connell, the Kardashian/Jenner family (including Caitlyn Jenner back when she was Bruce), Jerry Springer, Judge Joe Brown, Ne-Yo, Jeff Probst, Fred Willard, Serena Williams, Cheech Marin, Tommy Chong, and former MADtv cast members Alex Borstein, Mo Collins, Artie Lange, Will Sasso, and Debra Wilson.

== Opening montage ==
The visuals of the opening montage are essentially the same as season thirteen (except Bobby Lee's footage), but the theme music is back to being mostly a rap remix, using the vocals of "MAD!" and "You are now watching..."

== Cast ==
Repertory cast members

- Crista Flanagan (14/17 episodes)
- Keegan-Michael Key (16/17 episodes)
- Bobby Lee (16/17 episodes)
- Arden Myrin (15/17 episodes)
- Nicole Parker (12/17 episodes; last episode: March 28, 2009)
- Johnny Sanchez (14/17 episodes)

Featured cast members

- Erica Ash (11/17 episodes)
- Matt Braunger (11/17 episodes)
- Eric Price (11/17 episodes)
- Lauren Pritchard (10/17 episodes)

== Episodes ==
| No. overall | No. in season | Title | Guest(s) | Original release date |
|---|---|---|---|---|
| 305 | 1 | "Episode 1" | Jerry O'Connell | September 13, 2008 |
Barack Obama (Key) and John McCain (Lee) welcome new feature players Erica Ash, Eric Price, Lauren Pritchard, and Matt Braunger; Thai movie critic Johnny Gan (Lee) now hosts a talk show; the new season of The Hills with Lauren (Parker) and Lo (Flanagan); Eugene the Janitor (Key) meets Jerry O'Connell; Obama and McCain compete in So You Can Think You Can Dance?; Jerry O'Connell plays John Edwards in a music video parody of "Viva La Vida"; Coach Hines (Key) is forced to teach his sex ed class on Saturday after news hits about a pregnancy pact in another Catholic school; Arden Myrin interviews celebrities at FOX's environmental party. Featuring: Erica Ash, Matt Braunger, Eric Price, Lauren Pritchard Note: Erica Ash, Matt Braunger, Eric Price and Lauren Pritchard's First Episode as Featured Players.
| 306 | 2 | "Episode 2" | Chris Rose, Judge Joe Brown, Audrina Patridge, Zachary Gordon | September 20, 2008 |
Parody of Katy Perry's "I Kissed a Girl" has Ellen DeGeneres (Parker) question America's obsession with girl-on-girl love and California legalizing gay marriage; Keegan-Michael Key and Arden Myrin run attack ads against each other over who will open the show; parody of eHarmony.com has an elderly couple where the husband (Braunger) is only with his wife (Parker) so he doesn't die alone; another eHarmony parody where a plus-size prisoner's widow (Pritchard) is paired with a closeted homosexual (Price); a third eHarmony.com parody has a hapless woman (Flanagan) paired with a baboon; Bobby Lee and Johnny Sanchez sell an energy bar they created during "The Rice and Beans Tour"; parody of The Sundance Channel's Iconoclasts called Ikeaclasts is interrupted by FOX News reports warning viewers not to vote for Obama; Ozzie Guillen (Sanchez) holds a press conference filled with cursing and inappropriate comments; Chris Rose hosts an episode of The Best Damn Sports Show Period where a Wisconsin fan (Price) spars with a New York fan (Braunger) over Brett Favre leaving Wisconsin for New York; commercial for King Burger's new line of toys based on the darker, more disturbing elements of The Dark Knight. Featuring: Erica Ash, Matt Braunger, Eric Price, Lauren Pritchard
| 307 | 3 | "Episode 3" | TBA | September 27, 2008 |
Eric Price and Matt Braunger pretend they're the racist and sexist ad executives from Mad Men; John McCain's campaign manager (Matt Braunger) sets up a Facebook account for the senator; Nacho Hernandez (Johnny Sanchez) gets interviewed about the new Apple iPhone; John Mayer (Braunger) releases an album about his sexual conquests; Project Runway's new season contains connections to Top Chef and Top Design; an Albanian TV channel shows their version of America's Got Talent; Sarah Palin (Parker) takes audience questions; Arden Myrin goes on the red carpet during the premiere of Eagle Eye; the reality shows Living Lohan and Super Nanny combine into a parody, where Jo Frost (Pritchard) tries to teach Dina Lohan (Nicole Parker) how to be a competent mother. Featuring: Matt Braunger, Eric Price, Lauren Pritchard
| 308 | 4 | "Mad TV: Sexy, Dirty Politics" | TBA | October 4, 2008 |
A collection of Mad TV's political and historical sketches, including "The 2004 Presidential Debates", the music video parody "Under Barack Obama", "Angela Wright Meets George W. Bush", "McCain/Obama/Clinton Attack Ads", "Celebrities Reading Civil War Letters," and "Bill Clinton on Politically Incorrect". Featuring: Erica Ash Absent: Crista Flanagan, Johnny Sanchez, Matt Braunger, Eric Price, Lauren Pritchard
| 309 | 5 | "Episode 5" | Ne-Yo | November 1, 2008 |
Two-part parody of I Love Lucy shows Lucy (Parker) and Ethel (Flanagan) selling their bodies to pay off their rent, and Lucy trying to fight off Fred Mertz's (Braunger) advances; Johnny Sanchez reads a Spanish message to Mexican viewers, inviting them to come to America illegally; a "WeightSmashers" commercial gets interrupted by a man (Braunger) who keeps exposing himself; Condoleezza Rice (Ash) comes clean about the Bush administration's shady ethics and reveals her true, ghetto self at a press conference; video footage of George Takei's (Lee) wedding, featuring William Shatner (Braunger) as the priest; an eHarmony commercial featuring a zit-faced loser (Price) paired with a topless African native woman (Ash) who is saving herself for The Jonas Brothers; Ne-Yo appears in a sketch as a news anchor who hits on his female colleague (Ash) during a serious broadcast; an old man (Braunger) is offended over having to pay a fee for carry-on luggage at the airport; Barack Obama (Key) calls his speechwriter. Featuring: Erica Ash, Matt Braunger, Eric Price, Lauren Pritchard
| 310 | 6 | "Episode 6" | Jeff Probst | November 8, 2008 |
A new crime drama on TNT about a blond, amoral border patrol officer as played by Goldie Hawn (Myrin); Jeff Probst votes off John McCain (Lee) as the new U.S. President; Wendy Walker (Flanagan) hosts a tailgating party edition of 3 Minute Meals; Jeff Probst plays a priest in a sketch where Coach Hines (Key) goes to confession with Yamanashi (Lee) and Careco (Braunger); Geico commercial parody featuring Mo'Nique (Ash), Carlos Mencia (Sanchez), and Elmo from Sesame Street; a hungover newscaster (Braunger) stumbles his way through a man-on-the-street piece; professional basketball players Charles Barkley (Key), Yao Ming (Lee), and Lisa Leslie (Ash) read to children as part of a pro-literacy PSA; a new homicide detective (Flanagan) meets her new partner (Braunger) who can't take a joke. Featuring: Erica Ash, Matt Braunger
| 311 | 7 | "Episode 7" | Serena Williams | November 15, 2008 |
In a parody of Kitchen Nightmares, Gordon Ramsay (Price) bullies a nun and a priest into renovating their soup kitchen, and later, the priest and nun get their revenge on the foul-mouthed chef; Keegan Michael-Key welcomes melodramatic movie singer Lisa Gerrard (Parker); Nacho Hernandez (Sanchez) gets interviewed on a newscast by reporter Janice McCallister (Ash) about the economy; Lap Dancing with the Stars has celebrities performing risque routines; Serena Williams appears as superheroine The Black Racket, who must play tennis against a French player (Braunger) in order to stop Russia's plot for world domination; Nacho Hernandez (Sanchez) plugs his new custom auto paint store; a rocker named Dom (Braunger) teaches party guests how to play Guitar Hero: World Tour; a businessman must call upon Bae Sung (Lee) for translation; Queen Elizabeth (Pritchard) invites Americans to England and gets celebrity endorsement from trainwreck celebrities Lily Allen (Myrin), Amy Winehouse (Parker), Gordon Ramsey (Price), Kate Moss (Flanagan), and Naomi Campbell (Ash). Featuring: Erica Ash, Matt Braunger, Eric Price, Lauren Pritchard
| 312 | 8 | "Episode 8" | TBA | November 22, 2008 |
Parody of Britney Spears' "Womanizer" about Spears' comeback after years of being a tabloid trainwreck; American Indian Eddie Thundercloud (Key) protests against Thanksgiving; Al Pacino (Sanchez) and Robert De Niro (Price) exert little effort in their latest crime drama, Phoning It In; a CNN report about the current economic crisis includes Warren Buffett (Price) and a homeless man (Key) named Razzle Dazzle; after losing his money to the recession, Batman (Braunger) must resort to low-cost ways to fight crime (two-part sketch); parody of The Amazing Race has celebrity couples, including Charlie Sheen (Braunger) and his East Asian hooker (Lee); a look at the raucous men who work for J.D. Power (Braunger) and Associates; the Coffee Twins (Flanagan and Myrin) get upset when someone in the office steals one of their lame jokes. Featuring: Matt Braunger, Eric Price, Lauren Pritchard
| 313 | 9 | "Mad TV's Best of Holiday Sketches Spectacularly Special Spectacular" | TBA | December 13, 2008 |
Connie Chung (Lee) and Barack Obama (Key) host a clip show episode of Mad TV's best Christmas-themed sketches. Sketches include: "The Abercrombie Guys' Christmas", the animated sketch "The Reinfather", the "Tickle Me Emo" commercial parody, "Stuart Meets Santa Claus", "Maury and Connie's All-Star Christmas Spectacular", the animated sketch "Global Warming with Frosty and Al Gore", "Keeping Santa's Secret", and "Saw 4: Jingle Hell" Absent: Crista Flanagan, Arden Myrin, Nicole Parker, Johnny Sanchez, Erica Ash, Matt Braunger, Eric Price, Lauren Pritchard
| 314 | 10 | "Episode 10" | TBA | February 28, 2009 |
A couple freak out over graphically violent medical commercials while watching Sleepless in Seattle on TV; Miley Cyrus (Flanagan) and the Jonas Brothers (Sanchez, Braunger, and Price) show off purity body jewelry and their new sexually-charged abstinence-only tour; notoriously rude comedians Sarah Silverman (Parker), Carlos Mencia (Sanchez), Bobby Lee, and Gilbert Gottfried (Flanagan) fail to make fun of a dying boy during a Comedy Central roast; black talk show hosts (Ash and Key) outline what black people should do in case of a zombie apocalypse; Bobby Lee's Blind Kung-Fu Master returns; a nerd afflicted with many physical ailments (Price) competes in a car touching challenge held by a radio station; a pair of human resource representatives (Flanagan and Key) try to save a company that specializes in douchebags; Al Pacino (Sanchez) and Robert De Niro (Price) play sweetheart cops. Featuring: Erica Ash, Matt Braunger, Eric Price, Lauren Pritchard
| 315 | 11 | "Episode 11" | Jerry Springer | March 7, 2009 |
Jerry Springer gets accosted by people who act like the trashy guests on his daytime talk show; the host of a black history talk show (Key) interviews the air-headed daughter (Ash) of a deceased civil rights leader; on ABC's special What Would You Do?, a bystander (Sanchez) keeps cutting in with wrong ways to approach touchy social situations; Nicole Parker's women's history piece is undercut by Arden Myrin naming off events that have set women back; a Jamaican office worker (Key) shills his homemade reggae album; a night at a Benihana shows a black man (Key) who's overly amazed at the chef's skills while a white couple (Price and Myrin) is grossed out by an incompetent chef (Lee) decapitating himself; on the Today show, Ann Curry (Lee) talks with a mom/finance expert (Parker) who's at the end of her rope following her husband losing all his money; neurotic comedian Luanne Lockhart (Flanagan) goes out on a date. Featuring: Erica Ash, Eric Price, Lauren Pritchard
| 316 | 12 | "Episode 12" | Kim Kardashian, Khloé Kardashian, Kourtney Kardashian, Kris Jenner, Bruce Jenner, Tila Tequila | March 14, 2009 |
On The Situation Room, Wolf Blitzer (Price), Christiane Amanpour (Parker), guest star Tila Tequila, and Candy Crowley (Pritchard) report on spring break; Eddie Thundercloud (Key) returns to discuss spring break; another eHarmony commercial shows a snobby rich white girl (Pritchard) hooking up with a Latino thug fresh out of prison (Sanchez); a woman's (Flanagan) restless leg syndrome is cured by making her paralyzed; a group of spring-breaking frat boys (Key, Lee, Price, Sanchez, and Braunger) cope with being tricked into having a gay orgy; a real police officer (Key) tries to tell a bride-to-be that her husband is dead, but is mistaken for a male stripper (three-part sketch); Tank (Lee) hits on women at the beach during spring break and ends up with Candy Crowley; the Kardashian/Jenner family compete against Disney's Miley Cyrus (Flanagan), two of the Jonas Brothers (Price and Sanchez), and Raven-Symoné (Ash) on a lost episode of Celebrity Family Feud. Featuring: Erica Ash, Matt Braunger, Eric Price, Lauren Pritchard
| 317 | 13 | "Mad TV's Best of Michael McDonald Special" | Kathy Griffin, Michael McDonald | March 21, 2009 |
Mad TV friend Kathy Griffin hosts a special night honoring alum Michael McDonald and his fan-favorite characters, including whiny man-child Stuart Larkin, depressed Persian tow-truck man Mofaz, and paranoid floor leader Sean Gidcomb, along with his impressions of Dr. Phil, Hugh Laurie's Dr. House, and Maury Povich. Absent: Crista Flanagan, Keegan-Michael Key, Bobby Lee, Arden Myrin, Nicole Parker, Johnny Sanchez, Erica Ash, Matt Braunger, Eric Price, Lauren Pritchard
| 318 | 14 | "Episode 14" | Tommy Chong, Cheech Marin | March 28, 2009 |
Bobby confesses to Crista Flanagan that he slept with Nicole Parker and filmed it; Wilmer Valderrama (Sanchez) creates his own Punk'd-style hidden camera prank show; two more eHarmony commercials: one featuring a Mormon man (Braunger) and his five wives and one featuring a party girl (Myrin) paired with a man with severe medical problems and an abnormally large penis (Lee); a man (Key) gets freaked out by goblins; a single woman named Lydia Rodriguez (Parker) sells items for lonely women on TV at 3:00 am; on the final installment of 24 with Bobby Lee, Cheech and Chong's plans to spend the day with Bobby go up in smoke when the trio stay in and get stoned; two representatives for Webster's Dictionary (Flanagan and Key) announce new slang terms, misappropriations of existing words, and words that have fallen out of fashion; on IKEAclasts, Julie Andrews (Parker) and the Dalai Lama (Lee) team up to build a dresser drawer; Arden Myrin goes to a pole-dancing class; a Latin lover (Sanchez) plugs his new feces-based perfume called "Flirty Sanchez". Featuring: Matt Braunger
| 319 | 15 | "Episode 15" | TBA | April 11, 2009 |
A Latin thug (Key) contends with his cousin (Sanchez) who wants to give his tagging some professionalism; Crista Flanagan introduces a comedian who is in witness protection (Key); another eHarmony commercial about a woman coming out of a toxic lesbian relationship (Flanagan) dates a wanted serial killer (Price); Johnny Gan (Lee) and his sidekick, Pongo, launch a low-rent version of Deal or No Deal; two-part commercial parody showing how the VMW car stands up to running over those who rank low on the socioeconomic ladder, like Mexican gardener Polo Lopez (Sanchez) or wheelchair-using Special Walter (Lee); the X-rated stars come out at The 26th Annual Adult Video News Awards (three-part piece); the opening of the Clifton Malik Muhammad Memorial Library is interrupted by Malik Muhammad's airheaded daughter, Cerise (Ash); a man (Key) trying to fix his cable connection must deal with an automated phone recording (Ash) that has an answer for everything; Cottage Life with Jill and Carol; a commercial for an album of sound-alike songs from the 1970s and 1980s. Featuring: Erica Ash, Eric Price
| 320 | 16 | "Episode 16" | TBA | April 25, 2009 |
The Andy Griffith Show gets warped in a triple parody of modern crime shows like CSI, Law and Order, and COPS; Bobby Lee tries once again to win Crista Flanagan's heart; Coach Hines (Key) is put on trial at school for his bizarre and violent antics, then retires after revealing his true identity; Nancy Grace (Parker) reports on obnoxious morning DJs getting lost at sea; a gym owner (Braunger) exhausts himself flexing for the women who sign in; a final eHarmony commercial parody about a couple (Myrin and Braunger) who discover that they're related; a Sesame Street parody about childhood obesity and plastic surgery; Nacho Hernandez (Sanchez) meets Jovan Muskatelle (Key) and Bae Sung (Lee) Featuring: Erica Ash, Matt Braunger, Eric Price, Lauren Pritchard Note: Erica Ash, Matt Braunger, Eric Price and Lauren Pritchard's Last episode as Featured Players.
| 321 | 17 | "Episode 17" | Fred Willard, Alex Borstein, Mo Collins, Artie Lange, Will Sasso, Debra Wilson | May 16, 2009 |
Fred Willard hosts "Mad TV Gives Back," a telethon made to showcase Mad TV's generosity. Featuring appearances by past cast members and clips from past episodes. Absent: Erica Ash, Matt Braunger, Eric Price, Lauren Pritchard

== Home release ==
Season 14 was available for streaming on HBO Max and, joining seasons 11 and 13, was one of three seasons to have every episode available. Howdy and Tubi also stream this season with every episode available.
