= Mad TV season 13 =

Season of television series

Mad TV
- Season 13
- Digital purchase image
- No. of episodes: 16

Release
- Original network: Fox
- Original release: September 15, 2007 – May 17, 2008

Season chronology
- ← Previous; Season 12 Next → Season 14

The thirteenth season of Mad TV, an American sketch comedy series, originally aired in the United States on the Fox Network between September 15, 2007, and May 17, 2008.

== Summary ==
The 13th season of Mad TV saw more changes in show format and cast members.

Repertory players Ike Barinholtz, Frank Caeti, and Nicole Randall Johnson and feature player Lisa Donovan were let go from the cast (Barinholtz left due to creative differences while Caeti, Johnson, and Donovan were fired). Johnny Sanchez (the first Latino male hired since season six's Nelson Ascencio) joined the cast as a repertory player, while Dan Oster, Anjelah Johnson (the second Latina cast member since Jill-Michele Meleán's departure from season eight and the only Native-American cast member to join the show), and Daheli Hall were hired as feature players.

The show format had also undergone major changes. Brian Fairlee giving an episode preview was phased out and replaced with the return of the cold opening sketches (mostly music video parodies, fake commercials, mock movie trailers, and TV show promos). John Crane and Bruce Leddy—the series showrunners, head writers, and executive producers — directed most of the episodes. The show itself was relocated to a new studio (The Henry Fonda Music Box Theater) in order to give the show the feel of a live event, due in part to FOX's extensive budget cuts and competition from Saturday Night Live and its growing popularity from The Lonely Island's "Digital Shorts" on that show. MADtv's pretaped sketches shown this season were very minimal, using little to no elaborate props, settings, or costumes.

Between November 24 and February 2, MADtv became one of many scripted, current (at the time) television shows to be put on hiatus due to the 2007–2008 Writers Guild of America strike. Even though the strike did not end until February 12, 2008, three "new" episodes aired on February 2, February 9, and February 16. These "new" episodes were little more than pretaped sketches from canceled episodes and repeats of old sketches from seasons eight to ten (with no segments from the Music Box Theater). The show returned to its normal format on March 29, 2008.

This season was also the first of only two seasons to have "Best of..." clip shows a la Saturday Night Live, four of which aired prior to the show's official season premiere: Mad TV Ruined My Life (where Nicole Parker appears on a fictional episode of The Jerry Springer Show to defend the audience's claims that the sketch show's raunchy and politically incorrect sketches have traumatized and disgusted them), Survivor: Mad TV (where Jeff Probst and Keegan-Michael Key host a collection of the show's best TV and movie parodies), I Want My Mad TV (Perez Hilton and Bobby Lee's Johnny Gan character host a collection of MADtv's best celebrity caricatures and swipes at pop culture), and Mad TV's Most Wanted (where Michael McDonald and Susan Sarandon host a collection of the show's best recurring sketches and characters).

Notable celebrity appearances this season (besides the ones from the clip show episodes) include: Carlos Mencia, Neil Patrick Harris, Dave Navarro, John Reep, Kathy Griffin, Serena Williams, and former MADtv cast members Debra Wilson and Mo Collins.

== Opening montage ==
The opening title sequence for season thirteen has been dramatically redesigned. Rather than show pictures of the cast, the cast are seen around Los Angeles, similar to how Saturday Night Live has opening sequences featuring its cast members around New York City. The original Mad TV song used for the previous twelve seasons has been completely replaced by an instrumental rock guitar version. The show also has a new announcer.

== Cast ==
Repertory cast members

- Crista Flanagan (12/16 episodes)
- Keegan-Michael Key (13/16 episodes)
- Bobby Lee (13/16 episodes)
- Michael McDonald (13/16 episodes)
- Arden Myrin (12/16 episodes)
- Nicole Parker (13/16 episodes)
- Jordan Peele (12/16 episodes)
- Johnny Sanchez (12/16 episodes)

Featured cast members

- Daheli Hall (5/16 episodes)
- Anjelah Johnson (4/16 episodes)
- Dan Oster (9/16 episodes)

== Episodes ==
| No. overall | No. in season | Title | Guest(s) | Original release date |
|---|---|---|---|---|
| 289 | 1 | "Mad TV Ruined My Life: The Sketches That Shocked a Nation" | Jerry Springer | September 15, 2007 |
Jerry Springer hosts a fictitious episode of his talk show about viewers who have been offended by Mad TV's content and Nicole Parker appears to defend the show. Sketches include: "UPS: Brown Innuendo" fake commercial, "Flashlight Masturbators", "The Zapruder Home Movies", "Wizard of Oz Deleted Scene: The One-Legged Slave", "Mary Poppins Deleted Scene: Illegal Mexican Housekeepers"; the music video parody of Nelly's "Hot in Herre" about pedophilic Catholic priests, "RU-486: Motherly Regrets" fake commercial, "Ace Hardware: John Madden's Birdhouse Injuries", "Sesame Street: Big Bird Gets the Bird Flu", "Closeted Gay Football Fans", and "Brian's Scented Farts". NOTE: This episode also mentions a banned sketch called "Schindler's Lost" that was originally supposed to air during the show's first season, but was pulled for being too offensive. The sketch can now be seen on most online video sites and on the season one DVD set of Mad TV. Absent: Crista Flanagan, Keegan-Michael Key, Bobby Lee, Michael McDonald, Arden Myrin, Jordan Peele, Johnny Sanchez
| 290 | 2 | "Mad TV's All-Time Best TV Parodies" | Jeff Probst | September 22, 2007 |
Jeff Probst and Caress the Prostitute (Keegan Michael-Key) hosts a clip show of Mad TV's best TV show parodies, including parodies of Survivor ("Survivor: Cook Island: Racial Teams"), I Love Lucy ("I Love Lucy 98: Lucy Meets Prince"), The Sopranos ("The Sopranos on PAX"), House ("House Crosses Over with Grey's Anatomy"), COPS ("CLOPS: Paddington Bear The Flasher; Rock 'Em, Sock 'Em Robot Brawl; and The Pillsbury Doughboy's Rampage"), The Honeymooners ("The Honeymooners 03: Ralph and the Terrorist"), Lost ("Larry King Reviews Lost"), The Oprah Winfrey Show ("Oprah and Dr. Phil Help a Tornado Victim"); a fake commercial for the iPad menstrual pad; the Korean soap opera Attitudes and Feelings, Both Desirable and Sometimes Secretive; a fake commercial for Coors Beer; and a parody of The Montel Williams Show. Absent: Crista Flanagan, Bobby Lee, Michael McDonald, Arden Myrin, Nicole Parker, Jordan Peele, Johnny Sanchez
| 291 | 3 | "I Want My Mad TV" | Perez Hilton | September 29, 2007 |
Perez Hilton and Bobby Lee (as Johnny Gan from "Johnny Gan's Movie Reviews") hosts a clip show episode centered on Mad TV's best swipes at all things pop culture. Sketches include: "Kenny Rogers' Jackass", the P. Diddy/Kim Jong-Il music video parody "Bomb, Bomb, Bomb", "Britney Spears Cooks Thanksgiving Dinner", "High School Musical: The Other Students' Secrets", "The Apple iRack", the My Chemical Romance music video parody "The Black Tirade", the movie trailer parody for Memoirs of a Geisha, the music video parody of James Blunt's "You're Beautiful" ("I'm Beautiful"), "MTV's TRL: M.C. Escher Featuring Julie Andrews", the fake commercial "Tickle Me Emo", and a parody of Bravo's Project Runway. Absent: Crista Flanagan, Keegan-Michael Key, Michael McDonald, Arden Myrin, Nicole Parker, Jordan Peele, Johnny Sanchez
| 292 | 4 | "Mad TV's Most Wanted" | Susan Sarandon | October 6, 2007 |
Susan Sarandon and Michael McDonald host this clip show episode, highlighting Mad TV's most popular recurring characters, like Stuart Larkin (McDonald), Miss Swan (Borstein), and Lorraine Swanson (Collins). Absent: Crista Flanagan, Keegan-Michael Key, Bobby Lee, Arden Myrin, Nicole Parker, Jordan Peele, Johnny Sanchez
| 293 | 5 | "Episode 5" | Carlos Mencia | November 3, 2007 |
Britney Spears (Parker) comes to the new studio and gives the same lackluster trainwreck of a performance she did at the 2007 VMAs; on "24 with Bobby Lee", Lee and guest star Carlos Mencia try to stop a terrorist on an airplane who isn't a Muslim; 50 Cent (Peele) cries over being famous in his latest music video; a teen girl's (Myrin) new boyfriend is Master Chief (Peele) from the video game Halo; parody of To Catch a Predator has idiot Melvin Dufrane (Peele) admit to Chris Hansen (McDonald) that he's here for underage sex and, later, Master Chief gets busted; Arden Myrin goes on the red carpet for Family Guy's 100th episode celebration.
| 294 | 6 | "Episode 6" | Joey Fatone | November 10, 2007 |
iPod commercial parody features Feist (Parker) singing about Apple constantly changing their iPods; Joey Fatone meets an old woman who knows about the history of the Music Box Theater and stars in a reality show about air guitar musicians becoming famous; parody of NBC's The Bionic Woman is rife with lesbian undertones; tabloid news show Hollywood Lip Service catches older, more mature and established celebrities exposing themselves; Jordan Peele, Bobby Lee, and Johnny Sanchez show racially stereotypical takes on a pancake commercial; an airline outlines new ways to gouge money from its passengers; Anjelah Johnson does stand-up. Featuring: Angelah Johnson Notes: Johnny Sanchez's first episode as a cast member. Anjelah Johnson's first episode as a featured cast member.
| 295 | 7 | "Episode 7" | Mo Collins, Debra Wilson, Steve Byrne | November 17, 2007 |
Lorraine Swanson (Collins) visits Universal Studios; Whitney Houston (Wilson) performs "Pulling Through"; Gotcha! Action News (Peele, Parker); Rice and Beans: The Heartland Tour (Lee, Sanchez); thanks to the success of the movie Beowulf, fans can own the original Cliff Notes version of it; a parody of Bravo's Project Runway; parents (Parker, Peele, McDonald, Flanagan) concerned over news reports about kids getting high in bizarre, barely-legal ways decide to do it themselves so they'll have a frame of reference when they warn their own children against it. Absent: Angelah Johnson
| 296 | 8 | "Episode 8" | Kathy Griffin, Jon Reep | November 24, 2007 |
Music video parody of Rihanna's "Umbrella" has Hillary Clinton (Parker) madly in love with Barack Obama (Key); new feature player Dan Oster reads a snippet of a romance novel he wrote himself; Coach Hines fields questions from students; promo for a new cable channel dedicated to "dangerous job" reality shows in the same vein as The Deadliest Catch and Ice Road Truckers; a deleted scene reel from Kathy Griffin: My Life on the D-List; AT&T now has service for people in suggestively-named towns; another installment of Johnny Sanchez and Bobby Lee's Rice And Beans: The Heartland Tour; Bon Qui Qui (Johnson) annoys her customers at King Burger; a couple (McDonald, Parker) try to explain themselves to a police officer (Key) over a speeding charge; Jon Reep does stand-up. Featuring: Angelah Johnson, Dan Oster Note: Dan Oster's first episode as a featured cast member.
| 297 | 9 | "Episode 9" | Serena Williams | February 2, 2008 |
Parody of Avril Lavigne's music video "Girlfriend" has L'il Mama (Hall) teaming up with Lavigne (Myrin) to give her street cred and save her from being sued for using Toni Basil's "Mickey" in her new song; Bobby Lee does motion capture for a fantasy Sega video game; claymation auditions for fight scenes and love scenes; an unseen viewer switches between a Spanish variety show and news of a meteor on a collision course with Earth; Prison Break promo exposes the show's repetitive storyline; a black poet (Hall) uses spoken word to call out her ex-boyfriend (Peele); 24 parody where Jack Bauer (Oster) uses his brutal interrogation skills on an old man, an orangutan, and a little boy; parody of Criss Angel's Mindfreak has Flava Flav (Peele) ruining Criss Angel's (McDonald) tricks. Featuring: Daheli Hall, Dan Oster Note: Daheli Hall's first episode as a featured cast member.
| 298 | 10 | "Episode 10" | TBA | February 9, 2008 |
Crista Flanagan and Bobby Lee train to be surfers; Native American former weatherman Eddie Thundercloud (Key) runs for President in 2008; spoof of MTV's Hannah Montana has the teen singer (Flanagan) invited to a drug-fueled after-party with Matthew McConaughey (Oster), P. Diddy (Peele), and Amy Winehouse (Parker); two friends (Key and Peele) get involved in an over-the-top knock-knock joke contest; a Chinese man (Lee) is hired to test American toys for traces of lead. Featuring: Angelah Johnson, Dan Oster
| 299 | 11 | "Episode 11" | TBA | February 16, 2008 |
A spoof of BBC news featuring a parade of ugly British anchors; parody of crime drama Women's Murder Club where the women act too stereotypically feminine to get any work done; claymation sketches for monster and superhero auditions; Bobby Lee stars in his own survival reality show; a husband (Peele) thinks his wife (Flanagan) hired a teenage babysitter (Myrin) to come over for a threesome; a black man (Key) with a spot-on Bill Cosby impression gets upstaged by a white man (Oster) with a better one; Bobby Lee and Johnny Sanchez continue their Rice And Beans tour; a convenience store clerk (Sanchez) thinks one of his customers (Key) is a Muslim. Featuring: Daheli Hall, Angelah Johnson, Dan Oster Notes: Anjelah Johnson's last episode as a featured cast member.
| 300 | 12 | "Episode 12" | TBA | March 29, 2008 |
Juno sequel has quirky teen (Flanagan) harvesting organs; Barack Obama (Key) and Oprah (Hall) sing about how the former beat Hillary Clinton in the polls; in a thinly-veiled parody of the Eliot Spitzer scandal, press conference reporters criticize a deposed governor's (McDonald) cuckolded wife (Flanagan) for being oblivious to his infidelity and sexual misconduct; Fun With Clip Art shows a depressingly awkward conversation between bicyclists; Celebrity Rehab with Dr. Drew features burnt-out D-list celebs and a bad performance of "Greased Lightning"; Hilarry Clinton (Parker) gets a ride from The Depressed Persian Tow Truck Man (McDonald); Bobby Lee and Arden Myrin go to an American Idol party; a white shopper (Parker) can't describe a saleswoman who disappeared without bringing up the fact that the missing saleswoman was black; a depressed self-help author (Flanagan) speaks at a women's empowerment seminar; Roger Clemens' (Oster) interview about his steroid abuse is filled with innuendo about "getting fingered". Featuring: Daheli Hall, Dan Oster
| 301 | 13 | "Episode 13" | Kat Von D, Hugh Laurie, Chris Evans, Cedric the Entertainer | April 5, 2008 |
A parody of Snoop Dogg's video, "Sensual Seduction" focuses on tax time and what celebrities are going to buy with their tax returns; a parody of the E!'s Keeping Up with the Kardashians has Kardashian sisters posing and stepfather Bruce Jenner (McDonald) wondering what happened to his career; Pat Beth and Dontel LaMontrose from Inside Looking Out sing songs supporting Barack Obama; another installment of the Korean soap opera Attitudes and Feelings, Both Desirable and Sometimes Secretive; a complicated new game show on NBC is the product of the writers' strike and the dumbing down of America; Eugene the janitor (Key) meets Hugh Laurie, Chris Evans, and Cedric the Entertainer; Arden Myrin helps Bobby Lee get women in a bar and gets beat up by Kat Von D; a little person (Sanchez) is a member of an investigative news team; Fun with Stock Footage shows a dilapidated building being put up for sale. Featuring: Dan Oster
| 302 | 14 | "Episode 14" | Neil Patrick Harris | April 19, 2008 |
Parody of Pussycat Dolls' reality show Search for a New Doll; a former Vietcong (Lee) appears in a political ad attacking John McCain; parody of will.i.am's (Peele) video "Yes, We Can" about Kim Jong-Il (Lee); the Mannequin Killer (McDonald) returns, with Neil Patrick Harris as a fellow mannequin trying to stop him; parody of The Moment of Truth with Connie Chung and Maury Povich; Melvin Dufrane (Peele) calls the cops about a missing bag of marijuana and a driver killing his friend, all the while confessing to crimes he committed; a fashion makeover show where the hosts (Parker, Peele) kidnap and torture a fashion victim (Oster); a fat woman (Flanagan) can't understand a simple diet plan; The Rude Jew (Michael McDonald) sells mattresses. Featuring: Dan Oster
| 303 | 15 | "Episode 15" | Dominic Monaghan | April 26, 2008 |
An American Idol parody from Eastern Europe called Albanian Idol; Bobby Lee and Dominic Monaghan star in a Lost parody; Jordan Peele records a YouTube video message in response to a Star Wars parody; Johnny Gan (Lee) and Pongo return to review superhero movies; T-Mobile commercial parody where Charles Barkley (Key) calls Dwyane Wade (Peele) about covering up a death; a FOX News anchor (Myrin) interviews Latino hoodlums on the 2008 Presidential election; a fantasy film movie trailer parody has a boy's trip to a magical forest world undercut with real-world panic over the son's disappearance and his father (McDonald) accused of murdering him; a boss (McDonald) interviews a candidate (Key) while on the toilet; a commercial featuring abused dogs in a kennel is really a commercial for chain-link fences. Featuring: Daheli Hall, Dan Oster
| 304 | 16 | "Episode 16" | Dave Navarro | May 17, 2008 |
Spoof of the FreeCreditReport.com commercials has the singing spokesman (Oster) in jail and homeless after not paying off his credit cards; Dr. Phil (McDonald) tricks Britney Spears (Parker) and her family (Flanagan, Myrin, and Oster) into appearing on his show; on the latest installment of 24 with Bobby Lee: Dave Navarro discovers that Bobby Lee has a boil he got from lying to a blind girl; new movie Spin Up centers on sign spinners preparing for a dance-off; Sesame Street parody shows the fun side to living on the brink of economic collapse; a three-part Moms parody shows Mom Asparagus (voice of Flanagan) gets the Explosive Sneezies; Coach Hines (Key) returns to teach his class the art of war while on a paintball course; Luann Lockhart (Flanagan) does stand-up; the notorious Grand Theft Auto video game series is now a board game the whole family can play; in a send-up of American Idol, Bobby Lee and an old man are chosen as finalists over who will stay on MADtv as a cast member; a "Feed the Children" commercial parody has the announcer promising stronger kids with more donations. Featuring: Daheli Hall, Dan Oster Notes: Michael McDonald and Jordan Peele's last episode as cast members; McDonald would, however, remain behind the scenes as a writer and director. Daheli Hall and Dan Oster's last episode as featured cast members.

== Home release ==
Much like seasons 11 and 14, this season aired on HBO Max with no episodes removed for copyright issues. This also applies to the versions shown on Howdy and Tubi.
