= Jeanne Bice =

American fashion designer (1939–2011)

- Born: July 20, 1939; Fond Du Lac, Wisconsin, U.S.
- Died: June 10, 2011 (aged 71); Boca Raton, Florida, U.S.
- Occupations: entrepreneur, businesswoman, and television personality

Jeanne Bice (July 20, 1939 – June 10, 2011) was an entrepreneur, businesswoman and television personality. Bice was the founder of the Quacker Factory clothing line, which led to frequent appearances on QVC beginning in 1995. Her company, Quacker Factory, has grossed more than $50 million in sales, as of March 2011. She was also a frequent guest on The Soup, appearing opposite host Joel McHale.

== Early life ==
Bice was born on July 20, 1939, in Fond du Lac, Wisconsin, where she was also raised. She later moved to the nearby town of Ripon, Wisconsin as an adult. Bice and her husband, Arlow "Butch" Bice Jr., had a son and a daughter, Tim and Lee. She opened her first store, a women's apparel and gift shop called The Silent Woman, with friend Maryanne Diedrich, as a hobby. Her original store, which was bankrolled by both of their husbands, was located at Ransom and East Fond du Lac Streets in Ripon.

== The Quack and QVC ==
Bice's husband, Butch Bice, died of a sudden heart attack in 1981 at the age of 42, leaving her a widow with two children to support. Now a widowed housewife at 40 years old, Bice needed a source of income and had few career skills at the time. Bice, with the help of business partner Maryanne Diedrich, who divorced around the same time, and other friends from Ripon, began creating a seasonal clothing line which she designed and decorated. The clothing line would become Quacker Factory. In 2007, Bice elaborated on the early days of her business with the Palm Beach Post, "I never wanted to be in business. Mary Ann and I went into business on an absolute lark, and the result became the mainstay and support of our lives. Our shop was truly a gift from God. Mary Ann and I helped raised each other's kids, and helped each other figure out where we were going and how to get there."

Bice relocated to Florida in 1983, but continued to work on the Quacker Factory line and its eventual parent company, The Quack, Inc. She made her first appearance in QVC, a home shopping network based in Pennsylvania, on February 4, 1995. Her QVC debut proved a financial success, with her entire product line selling out in a few minutes while the show was still on the air. The first show created a sixteen-year relationship with QVC and led to Bice's numerous appearances on the network. Viewers began watching her QVC not only for her products, but also for Bice's stories as well. Bice was known on-air for her trademark headbands and sequined, decorated clothing. Her partnership with QVC transformed Quacker Factory from a small company into a multimillion-dollar business, grossing more than $50 million as of March 2011.

Bice's appearances on QVC and her Quacker Factory line made her a cult figure to her fans. Her core group of more than two million fans and customers call themselves "quackers." She frequently filmed guest appearances on The Soup and kept a Soup Award given to her by Joel McHale in her office, according to a 2011 interview with the Huffington Post.

== Death ==
Jeanne Bice died of complications from uterine cancer on June 10, 2011, at the age of 71. She was a resident of Boca Raton, Florida.

== In popular culture ==
Nicole Parker portrayed Bice in three comedy sketches lampooning Quacker Factory during seasons 11 and 12 of Mad TV.
