= Matt Braunger =

American comedian and actor (born 1974)

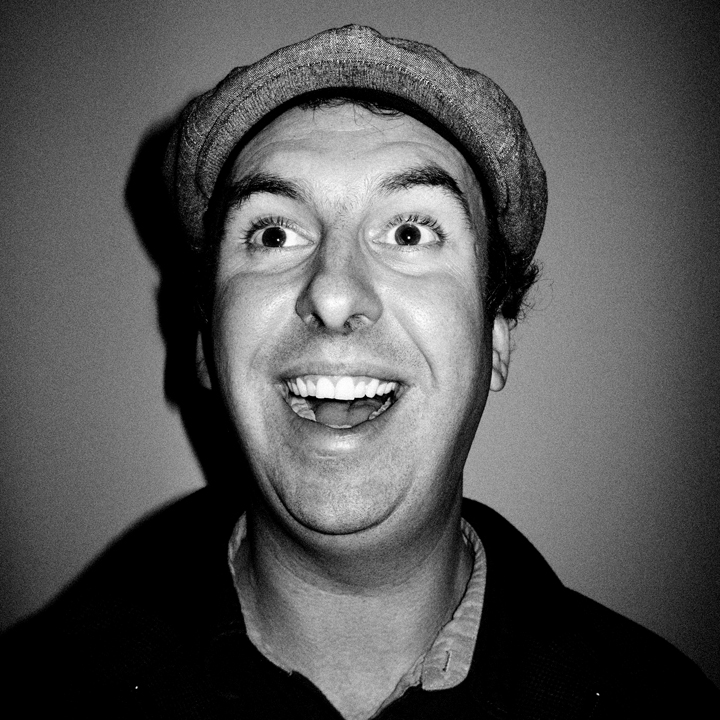
- Braunger in 2012
- Born: Matthew Braunger; August 1, 1974 (age 52); Chicago, Illinois, U.S.
- Spouse: Married

Comedy career
- Years active: 1997–present
- Medium: Stand-up comedy; film; television; podcast
- Website: www.mattbraunger.com

Matthew Braunger (born August 1, 1974) is an American stand-up comedian, actor, and writer. His most recent special Finally Live In Portland was launched by Comedy Dynamics in 2019. Outside of performing stand-up, Braunger is noted for being a cast member on MADtv during its final season in 2008–2009, numerous guest star roles (NBC's Up All Night, Marvel's Agent Carter, Netflix' Disjointed), and numerous voice over roles (Amazon's The New VIPs, Netflix' BoJack Horseman).

== Early years ==
Braunger was born August 1, 1974, in Chicago, Illinois. His family moved to Portland, Oregon, when he was young. After graduating from Portland's Grant High School, Braunger studied theater at Manhattanville College, in Purchase, New York. After earning his bachelor's degree, he moved to Chicago to develop his career in comedy.

== Career ==
=== Comedian ===
Matt Braunger has three hour comedy specials: Shovel Fighter (Comedy Central, 2012), Big Dumb Animal (Comedy Dynamics for Comedy Central and Netflix, 2015), and Finally Live in Portland (Comedy Dynamics for Amazon Prime, 2019). He also has six comedy albums: Soak Up the Night (Comedy Central, 2009), Shovel Fighter (Comedy Central, 2012), Big Dumb Animal (Comedy Dynamics, 2015), Going Way Back (800lb Gorilla Records, 2019), Finally Live in Portland (Comedy Dynamics, 2019) and "Please Hold Me" (800lb Gorilla Records, 2020). His late night appearances include Late Show with David Letterman, The Tonight Show with Conan O'Brien, The Late Late Show, Conan, John Oliver's New York Stand Up Show and Live at Gotham on Comedy Central. He tours regularly.

Braunger has been featured at the Just For Laughs Festival in Montreal 2007, The Las Vegas Comedy Festival 2007, South By Southwest, and won "Best Of The Fest" at the inaugural Rooftop Comedy Festival in Aspen. He co-founded the popular Bridgetown Comedy Festival that takes place annually in Portland. His debut stand-up comedy album 'Soak up The Night' was released digitally on July 14, 2009, on Comedy Central Records. In 2009, he was named to Variety's Top 10 Comics to Watch and Comedy Central's Hot 9 in '09 list. 'Soak up the Night' was named to the iTunes REWIND Top 20 Albums of 2009. In 2010, he recorded his half-hour Comedy Central Presents special, and in 2012 his hour-long special, Shovel Fighter, aired on Comedy Central. He released his third comedy album Big Dumb Animal in 2015 along with a special aired on Netflix. Matt released a fourth album and third hour long special Finally Live in Portland in 2019, the special now streaming on Amazon Prime.

His television credits include Mad TV, Up All Night, Agent Carter, The Michael J. Fox Show, BoJack Horseman, Happy Endings, Blue Mountain State, Maron, The New VIPs, Disjointed, Take My Wife, Man with a Plan, Fuller House, Superstore; and various roles on The Tonight Show with Conan O'Brien, the Late Show with David Letterman, United States of Tara, Pushing Daisies, Carpoolers, The Late Late Show with Craig Ferguson, Acceptable TV, and Live at Gotham. He also was regular guest on the Chelsea Lately roundtable.

MADtv Braunger joined the cast of MADtv in 2008 as a feature performer, during the show's final season on FOX (14th season; 2008–2009). Despite the short tenure (often not appearing in episodes), Braunger had a recurring character (Careco, one of Coach Hines' troublemaking students), a sizeable number of celebrity impressions, his most popular including Nick Jonas (with Eric Price and Johnny A. Sanchez as the other two Jonas brothers), Charlie Sheen, Jimmy Kimmel, William Shatner, William Frawley (as Fred Mertz in an I Love Lucy parody), and J.D. Power of J.D. Power and Associates.

==== Characters and impersonations ====
Celebrity	Sketch	Season of first appearance	Notes
Careco	Coach Hines	14	Another student in Coach Hines' class
Roger Stuart	"Drunk Newsman"	14	Newsman
Tom Bergeron	Various	14	Game show host
William Frawley	Various	14	As his character Fred Mertz from I Love Lucy.
Andy Griffith	Various	14	As his character Andy Taylor from The Andy Griffith Show.
Nick Jonas	Various	14	Musician; member of the Jonas Brothers
Jimmy Kimmel	Various	14	Comedian and late night talk show host.
John Mayer	Various	14	Musician.
Al Michaels	Various	14	Television sportscaster
J.D. Power III	Various	14	Founder of the J.D. Power and Associates Marketing firm.
William Shatner	Various	14	Actor
Charlie Sheen	Various	14	Actor

=== Other projects ===
Braunger and comedian Matt Dwyer hosted a weekly comedy podcast called MATTs Radio on mattsradio.com, they taped their final episode on September 30, 2010.

In 2012, Braunger starred in a pilot he created for Comedy Central titled Braunger, which he co-wrote with The Office writer Brent Forrester. The pilot was not picked up to series.

Since 2013, Braunger has hosted Ding-Donger with Matt Braunger, a podcast on the Nerdist Podcast Network which ended in 2018. He is now running Advice From A Dipshit with Matt Braunger, a podcast independently produced by Matt with his podcasting partner Amanda Rosenberg.

In 2014 he starred in Steel Panther's video for the song "The Burden of Being Wonderful". He has also appeared in Episodes 11 and 12 of Steel Panther TV's internet smash Demolicious!.

Braunger is a podcast guest favorite, and has been featured on Never Not Funny w/ Jimmy Pardo, Comedy Bang! Bang!, The Joe Rogan Experience, The Nerdist Podcast, You Made it Weird with Pete Holmes, The Bertcast with Bert Kreischer, All Fantasy Everything, Your Mom's House with Tom Segura and Christina Pazitski, Bullseye with Jesse Thorn, and Ryan Sickler's The Honeydew, among others.

== Filmography ==
=== Television ===
Year	Title	Role	Total episodes	Notes
2007	Carpoolers	Patient	1	
2007	iCarly	Gary	1	
2007	Pushing Daisies	Rick	1	
2008–2009	MADtv	Various Characters	12	
2008	Late Show with David Letterman	Himself	1	
2010	Blue Mountain State	Darrell	1	
2010	John Oliver's New York Stand Up Show	Himself	2	
2010	United States of Tara	Jarrett	2	
2010	Nick Swardson's Pretend Time	Various	1	
2011	Mash Up	Himself	1	Standup and sketch comedy
2011–2012	Up All Night	Gene Martin	19	
2013	Happy Endings	Kevin	1	
2013	@midnight	Himself	4	
2014	Garfunkel & Oates	Jesse	1	
2016	Agent Carter	Aloysius Samberly	5	
2016	Take My Wife	Bob	3	
2018	My Dead Ex	Officer Mitch Maloof	3	
2018	Man with a Plan	Reggie	1	
2018	I'm Dying Up Here	Reuben		
2018	Stan Against Evil	Dr. Barlow		
2018	Fuller House	Ralph	1	
2019	Superstore	Terry	1	
2019	Carol's Second Act	Gary	1	
2020	Upload	Brad		
