= Dahéli Hall =

American actress, stand-up comedian, writer and director

- Born: Gainesville, Florida, U.S.
- Occupations: Actress, stand-up comedian, writer, director
- Years active: 2003–present

Dahéli Hall is an American actress, stand-up comedian, writer, and director. Hall is most notable for her membership in the recurring cast of comedians on sketch comedy series MADtv during its 13th season.

== Biography ==
Dahéli Hall was born in Gainesville, Florida, on June 17 and grew up in Miami, FL. She is the only child of her Jamaican father and Haitian mother.

She earned both a Bachelor of Fine Arts degree from New York University's Tisch School of the Arts (1998) —in the Experimental Theater Wing—and a Master of Fine Arts degree in Producing for Film and TV from the University of Southern California.

== Career ==
Hall is a writer, director and comic actress, best known as a cast member on Season 13 (5 episodes 2008) of MADtv, and as the zaniest cast member on BET's prank dating show Hell Date. Her body of work also includes several web series created under the banner www.Tickles.Tv; a documentary short film and a finalist in the HBO short films awards, for The Memo 2004 and Mandingo in a Box 2006.

She says about comedy "... comedy is my primary vehicle for expressing myself. I describe my style as a special blend of humor and intelligence. I think of comedy as "the great diplomat": "I believe people are most open when they laugh, and that's perfect time to get them thinking and communicating."

A common theme in hall's film and stand-up comedy is the range of social issues that black people face. Her first work of note, a short film entitled The Memo, explores in comedic fashion the misadventures of Ted, who does not "get the memo" that the black revolution has begun. Mandingo in a Box features a life-sized, black, male "lover doll" that supposedly represents the ideal man for black women. Hall made a slight creative departure as creative producer of The Peace Process, a documentary that centers on a young man who tries to set a positive example in his heavily gang-influenced community.

Hall has also lent her talents to teaching acting as a substitute instructor at the LA County High School for the Arts, where she taught and created a curriculum for 10th- to 12th-grade high-school students on the basic principles of improvisation. Her first foray into teaching began in Spring 2005 as a documentary film instructor at the Zeitgeist Community Learning Center, where she taught Crenshaw area high-school students how to shoot, direct and edit their own short documentary films. Dahéli continued lending her talents in the classroom serving as a guest lecturer at several colleges and universities including Los Angeles Valley College as well as, Clark Atlanta and the University of Georgia, both in Atlanta. Most recently, she returned to New York to give a lecture at the Fieldston School (College Prep Academy), on "Gender Politics in the Performing Arts".

In 2013 Hall was involved as a mentor at the NYUinLA Mentorship Program for 8 months.

Hall now puts on her own comedy variety show every month called Dahéli Live! with episodes searchable on YouTube.

=== MADtv ===
Hall joined the cast of MADtv in 2008 as a featured performer during the show's 13th season, which was shortened due the 2007-08 Writer's Guild of America strike. She became the fourth African-American female cast member in the show's history (Debra Wilson, Daniele Gaither and Nicole Randall Johnson were the first three), and the only one to be Afro-Caribbean. Hall only appeared in five episodes of the show's thirteenth season.

== Selected filmography ==
- The 10th Date (tv movie) (2017)
- Angry Black Women (short) (2016)
- I Was a Teenage Wereskunk (2016)
- Mascots (stage hand) (2016)
- Exchange (2016)
- Fall Into Me (tv Series) (2016)
- The Late Night Experiment with Motown Maurice (tv series) (2015)
- Grace and Frankie (tv series) (2015)
- Cain Enabled (tv series) (2015)
- Sam & Cat (tv series) (2014)
- Little Knockers (video short) (2013)
- BioShock Infinite (video game) (2013)
- You, Me & The Circus (2012)
- 6Gun (short) (2011)
- Yacht Rock (tv series short) (2010)
- Hot Yoga (video short) (2009)
- MADtv (tv series) (2008)
- Mandingo in a Box (short) (2006)
- The Memo (short) (2003)
- Wonder Man (tv series) (2026)

== Other Credits ==
- Angry Black Women (co-writer, executive producer, producer)
- Exchange (creator, executive producer, director)
- Mandingo in a Box (writer, director)
- Peace Process (writer, creative producer)
- The Memo (writer, executive producer, director)
- The Memo (2003) was shown at the 2004 Tiburon Film Festival.
- Mandingo in a Box (2006) was chosen for inclusion in the second series of ABFF Independent in 2013.

With our partner ABFF, we are proud to bring 'ABFF Independent' back for an exciting second season," said Paul Butler, general manager, ASPiRE. "The series continues to provide an important spotlight for a variety of fun, provocative and moving independent projects from talented African-American voices.'

- Angry Black Women (2016) was chosen as one of 63 independent Pilots at the 12th Annual New York Television Festival.
- Exchange (2016) created, directed, and produced by Hall was one of 12 shorts on Disney Channel's aimed at young views. It was shown on the ad-supported online services and YouTube.
