= Significant Others (2004 TV series) =

- Created by: Rob Roy Thomas; Peter Tortorici
- Starring: Faith Salie; Herschel Bleefeld; Andrea Savage; Brian Palermo; Jane Edith Wilson; Fred Goss; Nicole Randall Johnson; Chris Spencer
- Composer: Al Wolovitch
- Country of origin: United States
- Original language: English
- No. of seasons: 2
- No. of episodes: 12

Production
- Camera setup: Single-camera
- Running time: 22 minutes
- Production companies: Thomas/Tortorici Productions; NBC Studios

Original release
- Network: Bravo
- Release: March 9 – December 19, 2004

Significant Others is an American sitcom that aired on Bravo for two seasons in 2004. Following four couples from various backgrounds in and out of therapy, it focused on issues of adultery, parenthood, impending parenthood, and the chore of behaving like an adult. Adopting the tone of many British comedies, it was almost entirely ad-libbed, without a laugh track, and put the viewer in the position of therapist, as the couples addressed the camera directly during the therapy sessions featured during each episode.

Produced by NBC, it was distributed by Bravo, the cable network on which it aired until its last episode on December 19, 2004. While it primarily flew under the radar during its short run, it was heralded by many critics for its originality, dark humor, and fresh take on the pains of wedded "bliss." Its entire two-season, twelve-episode run was released on DVD by Shout Factory on February 14, 2006.

== The Couples ==
- Ethan (Herschel Bleefeld) and Eleanor (Faith Salie): hipsters coping with her pregnancy, and the fact that they have yet to grow up themselves
- James (Brian Palermo) and Chelsea (Andrea Savage): yuppies married after an all-too-short courtship, trying to balance their busy lives... and actually getting to know one another
- Alex (Chris Spencer) and Devon (Nicole Randall Johnson): a successful African-American couple trying to be the best parents they can be, whenever they're not arguing with each other (or anyone in earshot)
- Bill (Fred Goss) and Connie (Jane Edith Wilson): a loveless couple, barely sharing an existence after Bill loses his job and all motivation whatsoever, until he finds motivation comes in very unexpected shapes and sizes

== Episodes ==
=== Series overview ===
Season	Episodes	Originally released	
Season	Episodes	First released	Last released
1	6	March 9, 2004	April 6, 2004
2	6	December 5, 2004	December 19, 2004

=== Season 1 (2004) ===
No. overall	No. in season	Title	Directed by	Written by	Original release date
1	1	"The First Time"	Rob Roy Thomas	Jordana Arkin, Rob Roy Thomas & Peter Tortorici	March 9, 2004
2	2	"A Dad, An Affair & A Blind Date"	Unknown	Unknown	March 9, 2004
3	3	"Intercourse, An Official Gathering & A Big Fat Lie"	Unknown	Unknown	March 16, 2004
4	4	"A Breck, A Brother & A Funeral"	Unknown	Unknown	March 23, 2004
5	5	"A School, Not Cool & A Fool"	Unknown	Unknown	March 30, 2004
6	6	"The Right House, The Wrong Gender & A Turn"	Unknown	Unknown	April 6, 2004

=== Season 2 (2004) ===
No. overall	No. in season	Title	Original release date
1	7	"A Date, Fate & Jail Bait"	December 5, 2004
2	8	"Crying, Lying & Still Trying"	December 5, 2004
3	9	"Rejection, A Connection & An Erection"	December 12, 2004
4	10	"An Ache, A Fake & Forgot to Brake"	December 12, 2004
5	11	"Related, Berated & Emasculated"	December 19, 2004
6	12	"Fright, Smite & Hindsight"	December 19, 2004

== Reception ==
DVD Talk, reviewing the "Complete Series DVD" said, "This show flew way too far under the radar, considering how entertaining it is. Despite making it through two seasons, for a total of 12 episodes, you'd be hard-pressed to find anyone who knows about it. That's a real shame, though the concept might have been hard to keep going without changing the cast regularly."

== Home media ==
The entire series was released on DVD in Region 1 on February 14, 2006.
