= Connie Chung Tonight =

American television newsmagazine

- Genre: Newsmagazine
- Presented by: Connie Chung
- Country of origin: United States
- Original language: English
- No. of seasons: 1

Production
- Running time: 45 minutes

Original release
- Network: CNN
- Release: June 24, 2002 – March 2003

Connie Chung Tonight is an American television newsmagazine hosted by Connie Chung. The hour-long series premiered on CNN on June 24, 2002. At first the show was live, then previously taped in a move the network hoped would improve the program's flow. The series focused less on hard news than some other CNN programming.

Although it achieved moderate audience ratings, Chung's show was suspended with the start of the 2003 Iraq War, and Chung's role shifting to reading news headlines. When CNN generally resumed regular programming, they did not bring Connie Chung Tonight back to air. The program was canceled in March 2003, and Chung did not return to air on the network, despite still being under contract with CNN.
