= Weekends with Maury and Connie =

American television news series

- Presented by: Maury Povich; Connie Chung
- Country of origin: United States

Production
- Executive producer: Lizz Winstead
- Running time: 30 minutes

Original release
- Network: MSNBC
- Release: January 7 – June 17, 2006

Weekends with Maury and Connie is an MSNBC television news series hosted by Maury Povich and Connie Chung. Featuring light-hearted take on news of the week, it aired for six months from January 7 until June 17, 2006, when it was cancelled for low ratings.

== Broadcast history ==
The show was announced on November 7, 2005, as a half-hour program in which talk show host Maury Povich and his wife television news anchor Connie Chung reviewed the week's news. Lizz Winstead was executive producer. In the announcement, MSNBC president Rick Kaplan said that "This could be the kiss of death, but for me they have almost a Tracy and Hepburn relationship".

The show was the first time that Chung had appeared on television as a host since 2003, and was the first time that she had worked with Povich on a national news program.

It premiered on January 7, 2006. Dan Abrams was appointed the new general manager of MSNBC in June 2006. Due to the show's low ratings, near the bottom of the charts, Abrams canceled the show. The last broadcast aired June 17, 2006. On the final episode, Chung, dressed in an evening gown and white gloves, sat atop a piano and sang a parody to the tune of the song "Thanks for the Memory". Chung was known for singing off-key parodies of songs, which she claimed were meant as "self-parody". A video clips of the performance was posted on YouTube, where it became the most popular clip of the week on June 20, 2006. At the time, it had 413,000 views, higher than the 232,000 views averaged by episodes of the show broadcast on MSNBC. and have been seen by more people than viewed Weekends with Maury and Connie during its run.

== Reception ==
The show received mostly negative reviews. In her autobiography, Chung called it "a dud, but, thankfully, no one watched, and we were off the air after six months."
