= Frank Caeti =

American actor and comedian

- Born: Frank Caeti; August 11, 1973 (age 52); Chicago, Illinois, U.S.
- Occupations: Actor, comedian
- Years active: 2001–present

Frank Caeti (born August 11, 1973) is an American actor and comedian, known for his time as a cast member on the FOX sketch-series MADtv from 2005 to 2007. Caeti is also an alumnus of The Second City and Comedysportz in Chicago.

== Early life ==
Caeti was born in Chicago, Illinois on August 11, 1973. He graduated from Standley Lake High School in Westminster, Colorado, and from Colorado State University in Fort Collins, Colorado. He trained at The Second City Training Center in Chicago and eventually became a cast member on a stage there.

== Career ==
Caeti joined the cast of MADtv during the eleventh season as a featured cast member along with Nicole Randall Johnson, and was moved up to repertory cast member in season twelve. His contract was not renewed before the start of the show's 13th season.

Caeti has appeared in the films Bad Meat, UP, Michigan, The Lake House and Stranger than Fiction; has done multiple television commercials, and has worked as a sports correspondent for PGA Tour Sunday and Smash Tennis.

Caeti wrote the New Looney Tunes episode "Bugs Over Par".

=== Impressions on MADtv ===
- Bob McGrath
- Gerard Way
- Jimmy Johnson
- Miguel Sandoval (as D.A. Davoros on Medium)
- Nick DiPaolo
- Seth Green (as Chris Griffin on Family Guy)
- Sylvester Stallone
- Truman Capote
- Zach Braff (as J.D.)
- Tony Sirico (as Paulie Walnuts)

=== Recurring characters on MADtv ===
- Baby Joey, a baby who performs on-camera when his parents aren't looking or are too distracted to care for him.
- Toby, a little kid who reports on adult news items, such as Mel Gibson's anti-Semitic and sexist remarks, Hollywood divorces in the mid-to-late 2000s, Michael Richards' racist rant at the Laugh Factory, and the controversy over steroid abuse in Major League Baseball.
- Merlin Pebsworth, the host of a Discovery Kids' science show called Who'da Thunk?, showing kids the wonders of the modern science world and revealing disturbing personal secrets that are tangentially related to the lesson at hand.
