= Connie Chung =

American TV journalist (born 1946)

Connie Chung Povich
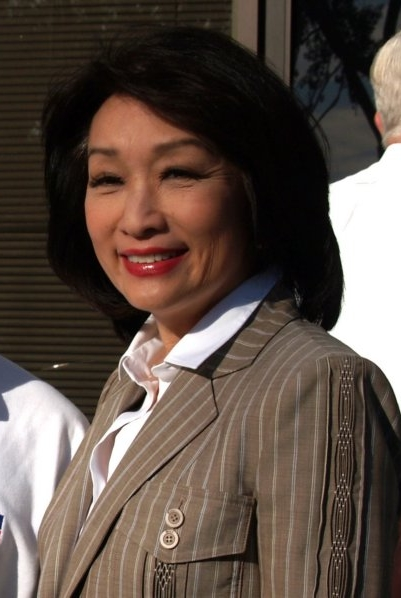
- Chung in 2008
- Born: Constance Yu-Hwa Chung; August 20, 1946 (age 80); Washington, D.C., U.S.
- Education: University of Maryland, College Park (BA)
- Occupations: Television news anchor; reporter; journalist
- Spouse: Maury Povich (m. 1984)
- Children: 1

Connie Chung
- Traditional Chinese: 宗毓華
- Simplified Chinese: 宗毓华
Transcriptions
Standard Mandarin
- Hanyu Pinyin: Zōng Yùhuá
- Wade–Giles: Tsung1 Yü4-hua2

Constance Yu-Hwa Chung Povich (née Chung; born August 20, 1946) is an American journalist who has been a news anchor and reporter for the U.S. television news networks ABC, CBS, NBC, CNN, and MSNBC. Some of her more famous interview subjects include Claus von Bülow and U.S. representative Gary Condit, whom Chung interviewed first after the Chandra Levy disappearance, and basketball legend Magic Johnson after he went public about being HIV-positive. In 1993, she became the second woman to co-anchor a network newscast, as part of CBS Evening News.

== Early life and education ==
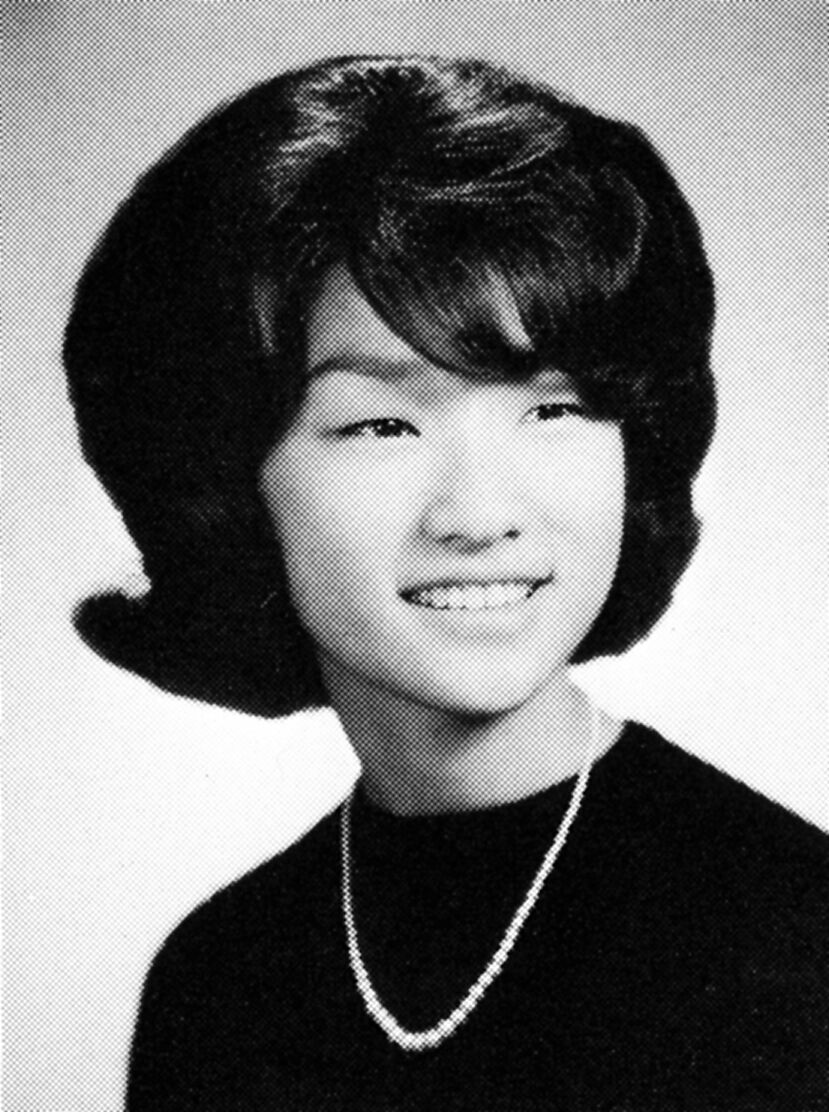
Chung in 1964

The youngest of ten children, Chung was born in Washington, D.C., less than a year after her family emigrated from China, and was raised in Washington, D.C. Her parents were in an arranged marriage. Her father, William Ling Chung, was an intelligence officer in the Chinese Nationalist Government, and five of her siblings died during wartime. She was named after singer and actress Constance Moore.

Chung attended Montgomery Blair High School in Silver Spring, Maryland. In 1969, she graduated from the University of Maryland, College Park with a degree in journalism. She was a summer intern for New York congressman Seymour Halpern.

== Career ==
=== Early career ===
Chung began her career as a copier at WTTG-TV until a position as newsroom secretary opened up. In 1971, Chung became a Washington, D.C.–based correspondent for the CBS Evening News with Walter Cronkite in the early 1970s during the Watergate political scandal. Chung left to anchor evening newscasts for KNXT, a CBS owned and operated station in Los Angeles (now KCBS-TV). Her co-anchors at KNXT included Joe Benti, Brent Musburger and Jess Marlow. The Los Angeles Times TV columnist said Chung "helped give Channel 2 an agreeable, respectable, middle-road identity". Chung also anchored CBS's primetime news updates (CBS Newsbreak) for West Coast stations from the KNXT studios at Columbia Square during her tenure there. During this time, Chung also served as the presenter for the Maryland Instructional Television series Terra: Our World, which won a Peabody Award.

In early 2018, Chung was asked if she was sexually harassed in her career. She replied, "Oh, yeah! Oh, sure. Yeah. Every day. I mean, a lot. Especially when I started out". Later that year, following Christine Blasey Ford's testimony to the Senate Judiciary Committee alleging she was sexually assaulted by Brett Kavanaugh, Chung was motivated to publicly share some details. She wrote an open letter to Blasey-Ford in which Chung said she was assaulted in college by the doctor who delivered her, during an appointment when she approached him for birth control.

=== NBC ===
In 1983, Chung returned to network news as anchor of NBC's new early program, NBC News at Sunrise, which was scheduled as the lead-in to the Today program. She was also anchor of the Saturday edition of NBC Nightly News and filled in for Tom Brokaw on weeknights. NBC also created two newsmagazines, American Almanac and 1986, which she co-hosted with Roger Mudd.

=== CBS ===
In 1989, Chung returned to CBS to host Saturday Night with Connie Chung (later renamed Face to Face with Connie Chung) (1989–90) and anchor CBS Sunday Evening News (1989–1993). The former show was also planned to move to Mondays, but Chung's increasing health commitments and pregnancy led to the show being replaced by The Trials of Rosie O'Neill. On June 1, 1993, she became the second woman (after Barbara Walters with ABC in 1976) to co-anchor a major network's national weekday news broadcast. (Note: Katie Couric would become the first woman to serve as the sole anchor of a major network's national weekday newscast in 2006, also at CBS.) While hosting the CBS Evening News, Chung also hosted a side project on CBS, Eye to Eye with Connie Chung. After her co-anchoring duties with Dan Rather ended in 1995, Chung left CBS. She eventually jumped to ABC News, where she co-hosted the Monday edition of 20/20 with Charles Gibson and began independent interviews.

==== Kathleen Gingrich interview ====
In an interview by Chung on Eye to Eye with Kathleen Gingrich on January 5, 1995, (mother of Republican politician Newt Gingrich), Mrs. Gingrich said she could not say what her son thought about First Lady Hillary Clinton on the air. Chung asked Mrs. Gingrich to "just whisper it to me, just between you and me"; Mrs. Gingrich's microphone volume was turned up as she replied, "She's a bitch". Many people interpreted Chung's suggestion to Mrs. Gingrich that she whisper her response as a promise that it would be off the record. Bill Carter for The New York Times reported, "Ms. Chung had become the object of some of the most ferocious criticism, justified or not, ever directed at any network anchor as a result of her now infamous interview with Speaker Newt Gingrich's mother, Kathleen". The interview was parodied on Saturday Night Live.

==== Oklahoma City bombing interview ====
A few months later, in the wake of the April 1995 Oklahoma City bombing, Chung was widely criticized for sarcasm as she asked an Oklahoma City Fire Department spokesman, "Can the Oklahoma City Fire Department handle this?" Many Oklahomans felt the question was insensitive to the situation. A few women created "Bite Me, Connie Chung" shirts in response to the interview. Thousands of viewers in Oklahoma and elsewhere called and wrote letters of protest over the tone of the questions. Moreover, co-anchor Dan Rather took particular offense that Chung was sent from New York to the assignment, as he was already nearby in his home state of Texas. Consequently, after public outcry, and Rather's complaints, Chung left the network after being removed as co-anchor of CBS Evening News.

=== ABC ===
In 1997, Chung moved to ABC News as a reporter on 20/20 and co-host of the Monday edition of the program alongside Charles Gibson. In 2001, she conducted an interview with Gary Condit on Primetime Thursday, focusing on his relationship with murdered Washington, D.C., intern Chandra Levy.

She was a guest host of the morning program Good Morning America. After short-lived host Lisa McRee left the program, Chung declined to take over on a permanent basis. She also was on ABC 2000 Today in Las Vegas.

=== CNN ===
Between 2002 and 2003, Chung hosted her own show on CNN titled Connie Chung Tonight, for which she was paid $2 million per year. Though her arrival at CNN was heavily hyped by the network, her show was panned by critics. CNN changed her show from live to tape-delay to improve its continuity. Although it performed moderately well in the ratings (a 500,000 increase in viewers), her show was suspended once the 2003 Iraq War began. During the war, she was reduced to reading hourly headlines. Once CNN resumed regular programming, Chung requested that CNN resume broadcasting her show as soon as possible. The network responded by cancelling it, even though her contract had not yet expired. In an interview, CNN founder Ted Turner called the show "just awful".

==== Martina Navratilova interview ====
In July 2002, Chung interviewed tennis player Martina Navratilova, who at that time had been a naturalized U.S. citizen for more than 20 years, about her recent criticisms of the U.S. political system. Chung labeled these criticisms "un-American" and "unpatriotic" and suggested Navratilova should "go back to Czechoslovakia" (which had ceased to be a united nation nine years earlier) rather than use her celebrity status to gain a platform for her complaints. When Navratilova asked why it was unpatriotic to speak out, Chung replied, "Well, you know the old line, love it or leave it".

=== MSNBC ===
In January 2006, Chung and Maury Povich began hosting a show titled Weekends with Maury and Connie on MSNBC. It was Chung's first appearance as a television host since 2003. The show was canceled after six months on air; in its final episode that aired June 17, 2006, Chung—dressed in a white evening gown and dancing on top of a black piano—sang a parody to the tune of "Thanks for the Memory". Video clips of the off-key farewell performance circulated on internet video sites. Chung commented, "All I want to be sure of is that viewers understood it was a giant self-parody. If anyone took it seriously, they really need to get a life". Chung has not made a return to network television in an official capacity since this final episode.

== Interview style ==
Chung's interviews were largely gentle, but often they were punctuated by a rapid-fire barrage of sharp questions. Consequently, her interviews were often used as a public relations move by those looking to overcome scandal or controversy. Some of her more famous interview subjects include Claus von Bülow and U.S. representative Gary Condit, whom Chung interviewed first after the Chandra Levy disappearance.

== Teaching ==
Chung accepted a teaching fellowship at the John F. Kennedy School of Government at Harvard University. While at Harvard, she wrote a discussion paper titled The Business of Getting "The Get": Nailing an Exclusive Interview in Prime Time.

== Personal life ==
Chung has been married to talk show host Maury Povich since 1984. They have one son, Matthew Jay Povich, whom they adopted on June 20, 1995. They live in Montana. Chung had several pregnancies, but they would all end through miscarriages.

On September 17, 2024, Chung released a memoir, Connie.

== Impact ==
In her early career, Chung was only the second woman and the first American of Asian descent to anchor a major nightly news program in the U.S. As such, for the growing number of new Chinese immigrants to the U.S. from the late 1970s to the mid-1990s, she was a rare, nationally visible representative. Many of these immigrant families, wanting their daughters to achieve and succeed, named their girls Connie after the one woman on mainstream media who could be seen as a role model for them. In 2024, Chung received the Hugo Shong Reporting on Asia Award from Boston University.

== Career timeline ==
- 1976–1983: Evening news co-anchor at CBS-owned KNXT in Los Angeles
- 1983–1986: NBC News at Sunrise anchor
- 1983–1989: NBC Nightly News Saturday anchor
- 1989–1990: Saturday Night with Connie Chung/Face to Face with Connie Chung anchor
- 1989–1993: CBS Sunday Evening News anchor
- 1993–1995: CBS Evening News co-anchor (with Dan Rather)
- 1993–1995: Eye to Eye with Connie Chung anchor
- 1998–2000: 20/20 anchor
- 1999–2000: ABC 2000 Today correspondent
- 2002–2003: Connie Chung Tonight anchor
- 2006: Weekends with Maury and Connie anchor

== Notable awards and honors ==
- 1974 Doctor of Journalism — Norwich University
- 1987 Doctor of Humane Letters — Brown University
- Honorary Doctorate — Providence College
- Honorary Doctorate — Wheaton College
- Honorary Doctorate — California Pacifica University

== Book ==
- Chung, Connie (September 17, 2024). Connie: A Memoir. New York: Grand Central Publishing. ISBN 978-1-538-76698-9. OCLC 1437542522.

== See also ==
- Chinese Americans in New York City
- New Yorkers in journalism

== Explanatory notes ==
Media offices
Preceded by Dan Rather	CBS Evening News co-anchor 1993–1995 with Dan Rather	Succeeded by Dan Rather
