= Johnny A. Sanchez =

American stand-up comedian and actor (born 1968)

- Born: May 14, 1972 (age 54); Los Angeles, California, U.S.
- Occupations: Stand-up comedian, actor
- Years active: 2000–present
- Notable work: Various roles in MADtv

Johnny A. Sanchez (born May 14, 1972) is an American stand-up comedian and actor, best known as a repertory player on MADtv from 2007 until 2009.

== Career ==
Johnny A. Sanchez has spent many years as a stand-up comedian and is a veteran of many Los Angeles comedy clubs. He has also done voiceover work, most notably as the voice of Lombardo in Happy Feet and he reprised the role in the 2011 sequel.

He has occasionally been confused with New York City native actor/producer Johnny Sanchez, usually due to the omission of the middle initial which differentiates both artists.

=== MADtv ===
Sanchez was on MADtv from 2007 until its conclusion in 2009. He was the show's fifth Latino cast member (after Pablo Francisco, Nelson Ascencio, Jill-Michele Meleán, and Anjelah Johnson) and the first male Latino cast member hired since season six's Nelson Ascencio.

==== Characters ====
- Nacho Hernandez, also known as "Lil’ Joker", a Latino thug who often appears on the news
- Farhid, an Iranian kite salesman

=== Rock Feud ===
In 2001, Sanchez hosted (and announced) an unsold musically-themed spinoff pilot of the classic game show Family Feud called Rock Feud for cable channel VH1. The bands Save Ferris and Lit were the participants.

== Awards and nominations ==
Year	Association	Award Category	Result
2008	ALMA Awards	Outstanding Male Performance in a Comedy Television Series	Nominated
