= Nicole Randall Johnson =

American actress, writer and producer

- Born: Los Angeles, California, U.S.
- Occupations: Actress, writer, producer
- Years active: 1998–present

Nicole Randall Johnson is an American actress, writer and producer. Johnson is best known for her work on the sketch comedy series MADtv.

== Biography ==
Johnson was born in Los Angeles, California, United States, North America. When she turned seven, Johnson's family left Los Angeles and she spent time growing up in Phoenix, Arizona and later, Portland, Oregon. She attended the University of Arizona, where she majored in theater. While pursuing her degree, Johnson performed in a number of plays and was a member of the school's sketch and improv group, Comedy Corner.

After college, Johnson moved back to Los Angeles and began studying at The Groundlings School and Theatre, whose alumni include fellow MADtv cast members Phil LaMarr, Michael McDonald, and Daniele Gaither. She became a member of the school's Sunday Company, where she wrote and performed for a year before becoming a series regular on the acclaimed Bravo comedy series Significant Others.

Johnson has had recurring roles on Key & Peele, Reno 911!, and Andy Barker, P.I.. A few of her other television credits include guest-starring roles on Single Parents, Prime Suspect, Weeds, Curb Your Enthusiasm, Monk, CSI: Crime Scene Investigation, The Shield, Hannah Montana, and Hot in Cleveland.

Johnson has had supporting roles in such films as In Her Shoes (2005), The 40-Year-Old Virgin (2005), Transformers (2007), Role Models (2008), and Murder Mystery (2019).

== MADtv ==
Johnson joined the cast of MADtv in 2005 as a feature performer and writer in the show's eleventh season. She became the third black female cast member in the show's history (Debra Wilson and Daniele Gaither were the first two respectively). She was promoted to repertory status for the show's twelfth season. Frequently recurring characters include Ka-Son and Darell, while her impersonations include Condoleezza Rice, Oprah Winfrey, Queen Latifah and Randy Jackson.

=== Original characters ===
- Ka-son: A customer service rep who gets in verbal confrontations with unruly customers. Her many jobs include: Komkast Kable phone rep, 1-800-Gifts-and-Flowers phone rep, Nightclub Door-Person and TSA Airport Security.
- Darell: A man who relentlessly asks women for their phone number. The character is exceptionally recognized as one of the most popular characters on the show.

=== Celebrity impersonations ===
- Oprah Winfrey
- Queen Latifah
- Chris Rock
- Condoleezza Rice
- Randy Jackson
- Star Jones
- Tyra Banks
- Beyoncé Knowles (as Deena Jones from Dreamgirls)
- Chandra Wilson (as Dr. Miranda Bailey from Grey's Anatomy)
- Eddie Murphy (as Mama Klump from The Nutty Professor)
- Isabel Sanford (as Louise Jefferson from The Jeffersons)
- Mo'Nique
- New York

== Filmography ==
=== Film ===
| Year | Title | Role | Notes |
|---|---|---|---|
| 1998 | Open 'til 3 | Diana | Short |
| 2004 | Reaction | The Acting Partner | |
| 2005 | The 40-Year-Old Virgin | Speed Dater | |
| 2005 | In Her Shoes | Rose's Assistant | |
| 2006 | Jimmy and Judy | Prostitute | |
| 2006 | School for Scoundrels | Shanice | |
| 2007 | Transformers | ASI Security Woman | |
| 2007 | License to Wed | Louise | |
| 2007 | The Brothers Solomon | Birthing Instructor | |
| 2007 | Truth Be Told | - | Video Short |
| 2008 | Have Tig at Your Party | Kaotanda Jefferis - Black Person | Video |
| 2008 | Role Models | Karen | |
| 2010 | Lez Chat | Disappointed Woman | Short |
| 2019 | Murder Mystery | Marisol | |
| 2019 | American Skin | Tammi | |

=== Television ===
| Year | Title | Role | Notes |
|---|---|---|---|
| 2002 | Felicity | Resident | Episode: "Ben Don't Leave" |
| 2002 | CSI: Crime Scene Investigation | Nurse | Episode: "The Hunger Artist" |
| 2003 | Miss Match | Nicole | Episode: "Who's Your Daddy?" |
| 2004 | The Parkers | Mrs. Carter | Episode: "Can Two Wrongs Make a Right?" |
| 2004 | Dragnet | Uni Cop | Episode: "Frame of Mind" |
| 2004 | Still Standing | Karen Gault | Episode: "Still Champions" |
| 2004 | Reno 911! | Bridesmaid/Stolen Hair Victim | Episodes: "Raineesha X" & "Department Investigation: Part 2" |
| 2004 | Significant Others | Alex | Main Cast |
| 2005 | Listen Up | Susan | Episode: "Snub Thy Neighbor" |
| 2005 | Half & Half | Reporter | Episode: "The Big Undercover Lover Episode" |
| 2005 | Monk | Frances | Episode: "Mr. Monk Goes to the Office" |
| 2005 | Inconceivable | Dana | Episode: "Balls in Your Court" |
| 2005 | Curb Your Enthusiasm | Omar's Receptionist | Episode: "Lewis Needs a Kidney" |
| 2005–07 | MADtv | Herself/Cast Member | Featured Cast: Season 11, Main Cast: Season 12 |
| 2007 | Andy Barker P.I. | Clerk/Nicole | Episodes: "Pilot" & "Fairway, My Lovely" |
| 2007 | The Shield | Leticia Gregory | Episode: "Back to One" |
| 2008 | Kath & Kim | Suzette | Episodes: "Respect" & "Old" |
| 2008 | Hannah Montana | Lorraine | Episode: "Ready, Set, Don't Drive" |
| 2010 | Hot in Cleveland | Eleanor | Episode: "It's Not That Complicated" |
| 2011 | Traffic Light | Cop | Episode: "Pilot" |
| 2012 | Prime Suspect | Diane Carey | Episode: "Stuck in the Middle with You" |
| 2012 | Weeds | Detective Crowley | Episode: "God Willing and the Creek Don't Rise" |
| 2012 | Greetings from Home | Emma | Main Cast |
| 2012–13 | Key & Peele | Rap Video Mom/Katendra | Episodes: "I'm Retired" & "Obama Shutdown" |
| 2013 | The Crazy Ones | Debbie | Episode: "The Spectacular" |
| 2013 | I Hate My Teenage Daughter | Ginger | Episode: "Teenage Cheerleading" |
| 2016 | The Crossroads of History | Prudence | Episode: "Smallpox" |
| 2019 | Single Parents | Dr. Rhonda | Episode: "The Shed" |
| 2022 | The G Word | Various characters | Supporting role |

== Commercial spokesperson campaigns ==
- Sierra Mist - In 2006, the lemon-lime flavored soft-drink line Sierra Mist by PepsiCo hired Johnson to join five other comedic performers—Michael Ian Black, Tracy Morgan, Jim Gaffigan, Guillermo Diaz, and Eliza Coupe—to portray the Sierra Mist comedy team, the Mist Takes, in a nationwide, multi-spot television ad campaign. Three commercials from the campaign, “Karate”, “Combover” and “Hospital Beds” debuted during Super Bowl XLI in 2007.
- DriveTime - In 2013, auto financing company DriveTime hired Johnson, along with comedienne/actress Katie Crown, for a "DriveTime Girls" ad campaign, each actress portraying one half of a comically eccentric duo of mobile credit approval agents "rescuing" potential car buyers rejected for financing by other auto dealers.
