= Maury Povich =

American television personality (born 1939)

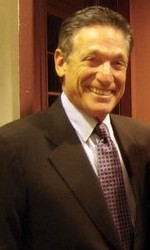
- Povich in 2006
- Born: Maurice Richard Povich; January 17, 1939 (age 87); Washington, D.C., U.S.
- Education: University of Pennsylvania (BA)
- Occupations: Television personality; podcaster
- Years active: 1962–present
- Notable credit: Maury (1991–2022)
- Political party: Democratic
- Spouses: Phyllis Minkoff (m. 1962; div. 1979); Connie Chung (m. 1984)
- Children: 3
- Father: Shirley Povich
- Relatives: Lynn Povich (sister)

Maurice Richard Povich (born January 17, 1939) is an American former television personality, best known for hosting the tabloid talk show Maury which aired from 1991 to 2022. Povich began his career as a radio reporter, initially at WWDC and later as host of a daytime Washington, D.C., talk show Panorama. In the late 1980s, he gained national fame as the host of tabloid infotainment TV show A Current Affair, based at Fox's New York flagship station WNYW. In 1991, he co-produced his own show The Maury Povich Show, which in 1998 was rebranded as Maury.

== Early life and education ==
Povich was born on January 17, 1939, into a Jewish family in Washington, D.C., the second of three children born to Ethyl (née Friedman) and Washington Post sportswriter Shirley Lewis Povich. His paternal grandfather, Nathan Povich, emigrated from Russia to the United States in 1878 at age 12. Maury graduated from the Landon School in 1957, and from the University of Pennsylvania in 1962 with a degree in television journalism.

== Career ==
=== 1962–1986 ===
Not long after graduation, Povich got his first job on Washington radio station WWDC, where he did publicity and worked as a reporter. By 1966, he was a news reporter and sportscaster for WTTG, the independent station owned by Metromedia. In 1967, he became the original co-host of the station's popular midday talk show, Panorama, which brought the rising star widespread acclaim and national recognition.

Seeking to further his career, Povich left Washington in late 1976 for what would become a series of high-profile, short-lived television jobs, beginning with WMAQ-TV in Chicago in January 1977. Hired to co-anchor evening newscasts, he joined the NBC-owned station to much fanfare—ahead of his arrival, WMAQ-TV produced promotions featuring testimonials from U.S. senator Hubert Humphrey and actress Carol Channing, among others, touting Povich's credentials. But Povich left after only eight months when, after being promised a long-term contract, the station's management failed to present him one.

Povich then headed to CBS-owned KNXT in Los Angeles—where he co-anchored alongside Connie Chung—but was ousted after a six-month stint following a change in the station's news management. Povich moved next to San Francisco, where he co-hosted AM San Francisco and co-anchored news for ABC-owned KGO-TV.

Povich returned to the East Coast in April 1980, when Group W–owned KYW-TV in Philadelphia hired him to anchor newscasts and host AM/PM, a midday audience-participation talk show which, in February 1981 would be retitled People Are Talking. He departed KYW-TV after three years and brought his career full-circle with a return home to Washington in June 1983, resuming as host of Panorama and anchoring The 10 O'Clock News for WTTG.

=== 1986–1990: A Current Affair ===
When Australian media mogul Rupert Murdoch and 20th Century Fox acquired WTTG and the rest of Metromedia's television station group in 1986 to form the new Fox network, one of the first moves made by the newly christened Fox Television Stations was to bring Povich to New York to host A Current Affair. Initially launching on WNYW in July 1986 before landing on the other Fox-owned stations, and into national syndication in 1988, A Current Affair was considered a tabloid infotainment show that often focused on celebrity gossip, but it also made time for compelling human-interest stories. Critics praised the show for trying to be both informative and entertaining, much like "a good afternoon newspaper." Povich hosted Affair until 1990. While at WNYW, Povich also anchored the station's 7:00 p.m. newscasts. He also served two consecutive terms as president of the New York chapter of the National Academy of Television Arts and Sciences.

=== 1991–1998: The Maury Povich Show ===
In September 1991, he began to host The Maury Povich Show, which was nationally syndicated and distributed by Paramount Domestic Television in partnership with his own production company, MoPo Productions, from 1991 to 1998. For raising awareness of National Adoption Month, Povich was honored by New York City mayor Rudolph Giuliani in 1995.

=== 1998–2023: Maury, Twenty One, and Weekends with Maury and Connie ===
In 1998, the show was taken over by Studios USA (then a division of USA Networks, later renamed Universal Television after being sold to Vivendi Universal; and NBCUniversal Television Distribution after VU Entertainment was sold to NBC owner General Electric). When Studios USA took over production of the show, it was renamed simply Maury. The show often veered into what critics called trash TV, and in 1998 it became known for a segment called "Who's the Daddy?" during which men who were denying or trying to establish paternity were given DNA tests and the results were revealed on the air.

On January 9, 2000, Povich hosted the short-lived primetime revival of the classic game show Twenty One on NBC. Reruns of the show have been aired on GSN.

In November 2005, MSNBC announced Povich would co-host a weekend news program with his wife, Connie Chung. The program titled Weekends with Maury and Connie debuted on January 7, 2006, but was canceled due to low ratings. The final episode aired on June 17, 2006.

He appeared as himself in the fourth episode of the sixth season of the sitcom How I Met Your Mother. He is portrayed as a New Yorker who is apparently seen everywhere in the city—often in several places at once. He also appeared as himself in the film Madea's Big Happy Family.

In May 2007, he launched the Flathead Beacon, a weekly print newspaper and online news source in Montana's Flathead County, where he has a home and is a member at the Eagle Bend Golf Club.

In 2015, Povich made a guest appearance on the Adult Swim show The Jack and Triumph Show. In March 2022, Povich announced his retirement and the end of his talk show after 31 seasons, making it the longest-running daytime talk show with a single host in American television history. Povich discussed his career with Greg Braxton of the Los Angeles Times that June, noting that he had accomplished all he had wanted to do during his career, was proud of what he had created with Maury (especially in maintaining the show's ratings in a time when daytime television audiences were shrinking rapidly), and had no further desire for any other television projects. In 2023, Povich made a guest appearance on the Disney+ animated show The Proud Family: Louder and Prouder.

== Personal life ==
From 1962 to 1979, Povich was married to Phyllis Minkoff. Maury and Phyllis have two daughters together, Susan Anne and Amy Joyce Povich. Their daughter Amy is married to physician and author David Agus.

In 1984, he married news anchor Connie Chung, whom he had met while working in the news department at WTTG. In 1995, Chung and Povich adopted a son, Matthew Jay Povich. Though Chung would have several pregnancies through her marriage to Povich, each of these pregnancies would end as a result of miscarriages.

Povich believes in the superiority of the nuclear family as a family model and believes that children are best served when both parents are in the child's life; this was a major factor in Maury's frequent emphasis on paternity testing. Povich took a journalistic approach to each story and took pride when an appearance on Maury would lead to the father and mother of a child reconciling.

In 2017, Povich became an investor and part owner of the Washington, D.C., bar and restaurant Chatter, along with other D.C. notables Tony Kornheiser and Gary Williams.

He is a fan of University of Central Florida football.

Povich owns a ranch just outside of Bigfork, Montana, where he lives for part of the year.

== In popular culture ==
Povich was mocked in a 2002 South Park episode called "Freak Strike". He also appeared in a mock episode of his show in the film Madea's Big Happy Family. On Jimmy Kimmel Live! Povich was spoofed overseeing a paternity testing involving Matt Damon, Kimmel, and Kimmel's wife Molly McNearney as Martin Short stood in for Povich.

In 2021, musician Lil Nas X collaborated with Povich to create a full-length faux episode of Maury, featuring Nas X performing as his Montero character, in a love triangle with his football playing teammate lover who is revealed to have a wife.

== Filmography ==
- The Imagemaker (1986)—Talk-Show Host
- Roseanne (1995)—Himself (episode "The Last Date")
- The Swinger (2001)—Himself
- How I Met Your Mother (2010)—Himself (episode "Subway Wars")
- Madea's Big Happy Family (2011)—Himself
- The Jack and Triumph Show (2015)—Himself
- The Proud Family: Louder and Prouder (2023)—Himself (episode "Puff Daddy")
