= Paul C. Vogt =

American actor and comedian (born 1964)

Paul Vogt
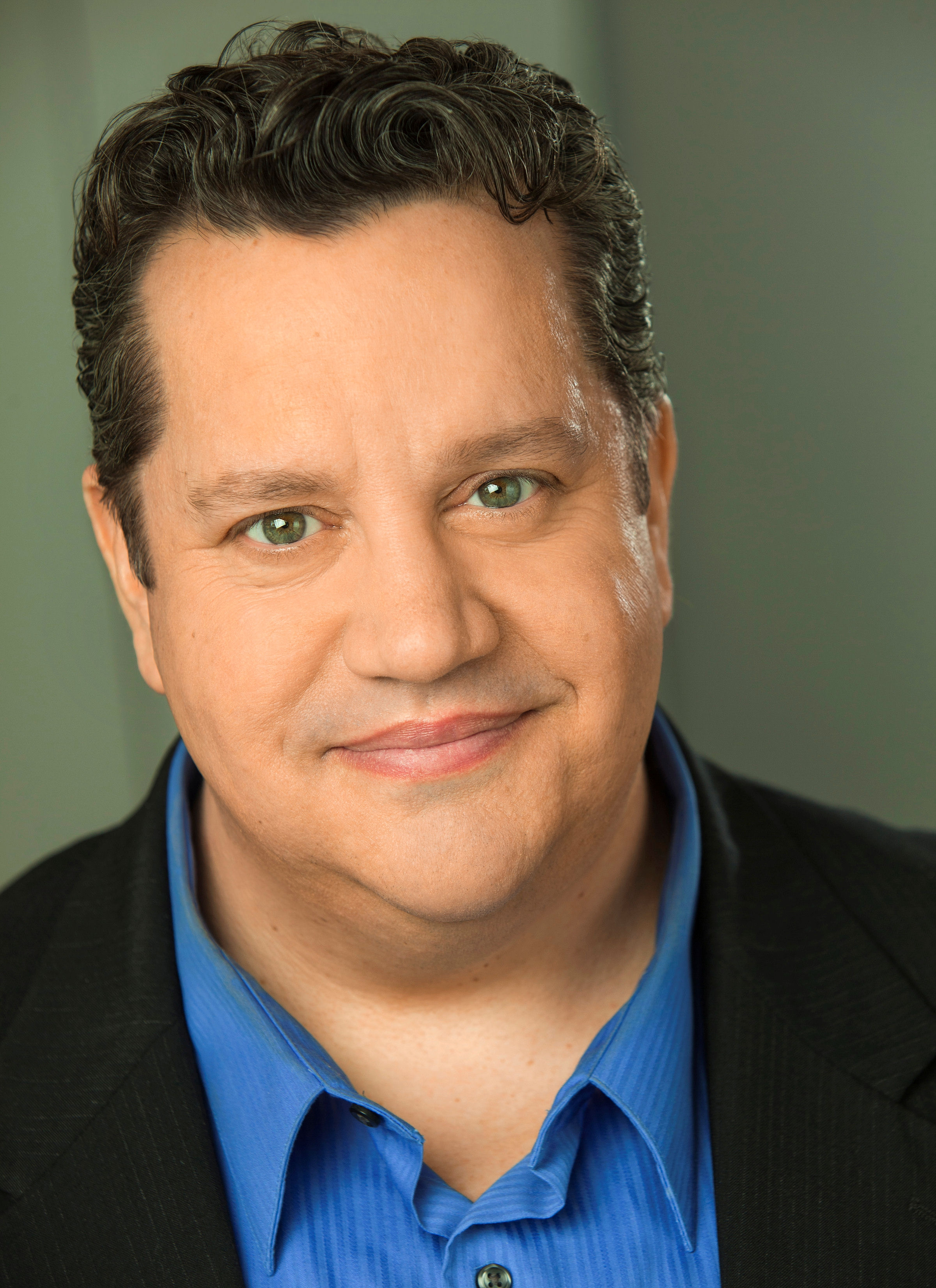
- Vogt in March 2013
- Born: December 16, 1964 (age 61); Buffalo, New York, U.S.
- Occupations: Actor, comedian
- Years active: 1987–present
- Relatives: Peter Allen Vogt (twin brother)

Paul Calvin Vogt (born December 16, 1964) is an American actor and comedian, best known for his work as a cast member on the sketch comedy programs Mad TV, The Big Gay Sketch Show, and The Rerun Show.

== Life and career ==
Paul C. Vogt was born in Buffalo, New York. He graduated from Kenmore East High School in 1982. Most famous for appearing on TV and film in Mad TV, episodes of Arrested Development, Reno 911!, Hannah Montana, and Maximum Bob, and the films The Princess Diaries 2: Royal Engagement and Valentine's Day.

Vogt has guest starred on Chicago Hope, Hannah Montana, In-Laws, Grey's Anatomy, and Glee. He was a regular cast member of the NBC summer series The Rerun Show. He has also starred in several commercials, independent films, and stage work. He also acted as Jimbo Milachi in Happy Days, a musical based on the hit television series by Garry Marshall at the Falcon Theater in Burbank. He also appeared in Marshall's film Raising Helen.

In January 2007, he took over the lead role of Edna Turnblad in the Broadway production of Hairspray (the role created by Divine in the John Waters film and then by Tony winner Harvey Fierstein on Broadway). Previously, he played the role in the Las Vegas production (succeeding Harvey Fierstein) in May 2006, as well as the regional theatre premiere at the North Shore Music Theatre (Beverly, Massachusetts) in the fall of 2006. He appeared in the movie Blonde Ambition, filming his scenes in between Hairspray performances. Paul voiced the character Buzz Offmann in the 2008 animated film Igor.

In August 2008, he reprised his role as Edna Turnblad in Hairspray for 12 performances at the Sacramento Music Circus. He also reprised the role in August 2009 at The Muny.

In 2011, appeared as Ursula in the summer production of The Little Mermaid at The Muny in St. Louis.

In January 2013, he once again reprised his role as Edna Turnblad with the Indianapolis Symphony Orchestra's production of Hairspray in Concert. The concert also played the Baltimore Symphony Orchestra the same month. He went on to appear in Hairspray Live! playing Harriman F. Spritzer, broadcast on December 7, 2016.

In 2019, Vogt joined the cast of Perfect Harmony on NBC.

=== Mad TV ===
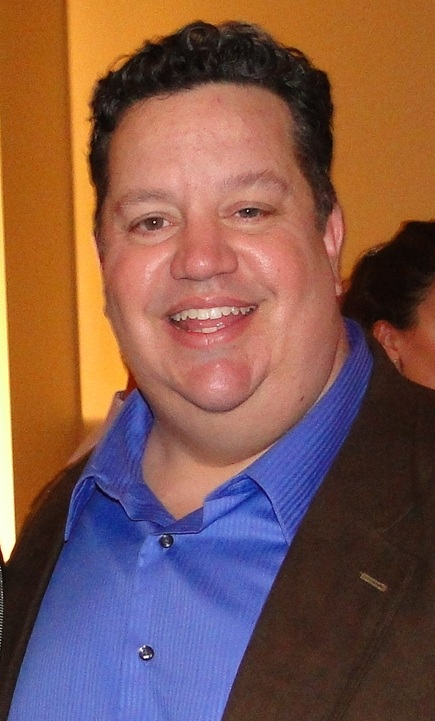
Vogt in 2011

Vogt joined the cast of Mad TV during the eighth season as a featured player, then was promoted to repertory status the following. He created characters such as flamboyant Lillian Verner Game Show host Dale Briskett and Angela Wright's Canadian cousin Natalie. His celebrity impersonations included Charlotte Rae (a reprisal of Mrs. Edna Garrett from The Rerun Show), Dick Cheney, James Lipton, and Richard Simmons. He left the TV show because he had an out in his contract after three years. Vogt is the second cast member (after Nelson Ascencio) to have a twin sibling appear with each other in a sketch in the show. Vogt was also the only known openly gay cast member.

Characters

- 2-Litre Beth (Fantanas)
- Cynthia "Cindy" Delmont (Big Lady), a plus-sized woman who is oblivious to being discriminated against due to her size.
- Dale Briskett (Lillian Verner Game Show)
- Ernie "Ernest" (The B.S.)
- Harvey Muckenthaler (Stuart Larkin)
- Carlton "Carl" Swanson, Sr. (Lorraine Swanson)
- Natalie Wright
- Nurse (7:00 AM Condo Report)
- Officer Rufus Champagne, a police officer who keeps getting attacked by midgets.
- Sister Mary (Coach Hines)

=== Celebrity impressions ===
- Ben Franklin
- Bert Lahr (as the Cowardly Lion on The Wizard of Oz)
- Bruce Vilanch
- Camryn Manheim
- Charlotte Rae
- David White (as Larry Tate in Bewitched)
- Diana DeGarmo
- Dick Cheney
- Ed Asner
- Ethan Suplee
- Franklin Cover (as Tom Willis on The Jeffersons)
- Jackie Gleason
- James Lipton
- Jeff Garlin
- Jorge Garcia
- Kevin James
- Kirstie Alley
- Les Moonves
- Michael Moloney
- Michael Moore
- Melissa McCarthy
- Queen Elizabeth II
- René Angélil
- Richard Simmons
- Steve Harwell
- Thom Filicia
- Tom Poston
- Willard Scott

== Personal life ==
Vogt was diagnosed with non-Hodgkin's lymphoma in 2013. As of April 2015, Vogt is now a stage 4 lymphoma survivor and is in recovery.

== Filmography ==
- 1987: My Dark Lady as Tweedle Dee
- 1997: Kenan & Kel as Waiter
- 1998: Maximum Bob as Bogart Crowe
- 1999: The First of May as Tom (or Hank)
- 1999: The Blair Clown Project as Fisherman
- 2000: Chicago Hope as Earl Pepper
- 2000: Five Wishes as Big Guy #2
- 2002: The Rerun Show as Various
- 2002: In-Laws as Bruce Sherman
- 2002–05: Mad TV as Various
- 2003: Spanish Fly as Brick's Manager #1
- 2003: An American Reunion as Big Will Grunger
- 2003: Good Boy! as Bob the Dog Catcher
- 2003–05: Reno 911! as Paintball Sniper
- 2004: The Princess Diaries 2: Royal Engagement as Lord Crawley
- 2005: Lilo & Stitch 2: Stitch Has a Glitch as Gator Guard
- 2005: Arrested Development as Twin #1
- 2006–08: Hannah Montana as Mr. Dontzig
- 2007: Blonde Ambition as Floyd
- 2008: The Big Gay Sketch Show as Various
- 2008: Happy Wednesday as Handsy Agent
- 2008: Igor as Buzz Offmann
- 2008: Precious Meadows as Brad Bolhuis
- 2009: Rise and Fall of Tuck Johnson as Oliver Bone
- 2010: Grey's Anatomy as Aaron Mafrici
- 2010: Valentine's Day as Shouting Sheldon
- 2010: Glee as Herb Duncan
- 2011: Kung Fu Panda: Secrets of the Masters as Pig Announcer
- 2012: Pack of Wolves as The Thin Man
- 2013: Raising Hope as Saul
- 2016: Mother's Day as Tiny
- 2016: Hairspray Live! as Mr. Harriman F. Spritzer
- 2017: The Orville as Horbalak Captain
