= Once Upon a Forest =

1993 film by Charles Grosvenor

- Theatrical release poster
- Directed by: Charles Grosvenor
- Written by: Mark Young; Kelly Ward
- Based on: A Furling's Story by Rae Lambert
- Produced by: David Kirschner; Jerry Mills
- Starring: Michael Crawford; Ben Vereen
- Edited by: Pat A. Foley
- Music by: James Horner
- Production companies: Hanna-Barbera; Endangered Film Company; HTV Cymru/Wales
- Distributed by: 20th Century Fox
- Release dates: June 18, 1993 (United States); October 22, 1993 (United Kingdom)
- Running time: 71 minutes
- Countries: United States; United Kingdom
- Language: English
- Budget: $13–16 million
- Box office: $6.6 million (US)

Once Upon a Forest is a 1993 animated musical adventure film produced by Hanna-Barbera and distributed by 20th Century Fox. Based on the Furlings characters created by Rae Lambert, the film was directed by Charles Grosvenor and produced by David Kirschner, and stars the voices of Michael Crawford and Ben Vereen. The film is about a trio of "Furlings" – the story's term for young anthropomorphic animals – who go on an expedition to find a cure for their poisoned friend.

The film's environmental theme divided critics at the time of its release, along with the animation and story. The film grossed $6.6 million in the US against a budget of $13–16 million.

== Plot ==
In a meadow called Dapplewood, a mouse named Abigail, a mole named Edgar, a hedgehog named Russell and a young badger named Michelle are all students of Michelle's uncle, Cornelius. One day, Cornelius takes them on a hike in the woods nearby, accidentally coming across a road. Russell is almost run over by a car and a glass bottle is tossed out of the window. Soon after, a poison gas truck comes down the road and its tire is punctured by the piece of the broken bottle causing the truck to skid off the road. The tank is ruptured and gas begins leaking into the forest, while the driver hurries off to get help.

Dapplewood is devastated by the gas. Michelle runs toward her home, crying out for her parents, and she fails to heed warnings from the others before running inside, and breathing in the deadly gas fumes within. Abigail subsequently runs into the house and retrieves Michelle, who is rendered comatose by the gas. But unfortunately, Michelle's parents are already dead. At his house, Cornelius explains to them of his past encounter with gas spreading humans when he and his sister (Michelle's mother) were forced to flee and leave their parents behind. In order to save Michelle, he explains that the Furlings need to collect plenty of Lung-wort and Eye-bright, herbs that will help with the damage the gas did to her. But because the plants nearby were destroyed by the gas, the Furlings are forced to find another meadow to find them and bring back the herbs in two days or Michelle will die.

On their first night of travelling, Abigail, Edgar and Russell catch the attention of a monstrous one-eyed barn owl after Abigail leads them over an open field. The owl briefly captures Abigail, but she escapes his nest, and they manage to find a safe place to sleep. In the early morning, they encounter a flock of religious wrens preparing to bid farewell to a young wren child, who has gotten his feet stuck in a mud puddle. Recognizing that he can be saved, Edgar stops the "funeral" and devises a plan to free him. They are successful and the wrens celebrate.

Afterward, their leader, Phineas is asked about the meadow and he explains that it lies beyond the land of the yellow dragons, which is actually a construction site with construction vehicles. The three of them manage to escape the site from a sewer grate to safety, later emerging in a pond next to the other meadow. After getting the attention of the locals, they easily find a field full of Eye-bright, but find the Lung-wort high up on a treacherous-looking cliff. While thinking of a plan, Russell finds the designs for a flying machine invented by Cornelius and they build it for real. After taking off, Abigail volunteers to climb out on the wing to grab the herb as they pass. She loses her balance, and Edgar saves her as she loses her grip on the wing. Despairing for a moment, seeing the Lung-wort missing from the cliff, they are relieved when Edgar finds it caught on the wing and then fly off toward home.

Passing through a storm on their way back, they make a crash landing in the woods below and realize that they have made it back home. They hurry to Cornelius, giving him the herbs. Moments later, they hear noises from outside and see humans out the window. Anticipating harm, all of them escape through the back door. Edgar gets separated from the group and gets caught in an animal trap. When one of the humans finds him, Cornelius and his friends are surprised when he frees Edgar, releases him and disposes of the trap, declaring the area clean.

Michelle is given the remedy and she appears unresponsive the next day. After a single tear shed by Cornelius falls on her, she revives to their delight. Cornelius then sees the flying machine and is amazed by how the three of them have matured over the last several days. The surviving Dapplewood residents, who had fled the area to escape the gas, return. Abigail, Edgar and Russell are reunited with their families, and Cornelius takes in Michelle as all reflect on how they still have to work together.

== Cast ==
- Michael Crawford as Cornelius, a badger who is Michelle's uncle and the teacher of the Furlings. Crawford also acts as the film's narrator.
- Ellen Blain as Abigail, a headstrong wood mouse and the leader of the Furlings.
- Benji Gregory as Edgar, a young mole and the planner of the furlings. This was Gregory's final role before his death in 2024.
- Paige Gosney as Russell, a young hedgehog and the doer of the furlings.
- Elisabeth Moss as Michelle, Cornelius' niece who becomes comatose after inhaling poisonous gas.
- Ben Vereen as Phineas, the leader of a flock of religious wrens.
- Will Estes as Willy, a young and tough but sensible mouse from Oakdale who takes a liking to Abigail.
- Charlie Adler as Waggs, an inconsiderate squirrel from Oakdale who acts hostile towards the Furlings when they arrive.
- Rickey D'Shon Collins as Bosworth, a young wren who is saved from a puddle of mud by the Furlings.
- Don Reed as a marshbird
- Robert David Hall as the driver of the tank truck that crashes into Dapplewood.
- Paul Eiding as Abigail's unnamed father
- Janet Waldo as Edgar's unnamed mother
- Susan Silo as Russell's unnamed mother
- Angel Harper as Bosworth's unnamed mother
- Benjamin Kimball Smith as Russell's unnamed brother
- Haven Hartman as Russell's unnamed sister

== Production ==
Once Upon a Forest was conceived as early as 1989, when the head of graphic design at ITV Cymru Wales (at the time known as Harlech Television, HTV), Rae Lambert, devised an environmental tale entitled A Furling's Story as a pitch to the American cartoon studio Hanna-Barbera (owned by Turner Broadcasting since 1991), along with partner Mike Young. Thanks to screenwriters Mark Young and Kelly Ward, the project started as a made-for-TV film with The Endangered as its new name.

At the suggestion of Liz Kirschner, the wife of the film's producer, The Phantom of the Opera's Broadway star Michael Crawford was chosen to play Cornelius. Members of South Central Los Angeles' First Baptist Church were chosen to voice the chorus accompanying the preacher bird Phineas (voiced by Ben Vereen). While filming the live-action references, the crew "was thrilled beyond [...] expectations [as the chorus] started flipping their arms and moving their tambourines", as Kirschner recalled.

William Hanna, co-founder and chairman of Hanna-Barbera, was in charge of the film's production as its executive producer. William told to The Atlanta Journal-Constitution in May 1993 that it was the "finest feature production [we have] ever done", and was happy that the studio accepted his proposal.

Kirscher spoke to The Dallas Morning News' Philip Wuntch a month later on the diversity of the film's production services: "Disney has great animators, and the studio has them locked up for years and years. We got the best worldwide animators available from Sweden [actually Denmark], Asia, Argentina, Spain and England [actually Canada]". Work on the animation was in the hands of Wang Film Productions in Taiwan; Lapiz Azul Animation and Matias Marcos Animation of Spain; the Jaime Diaz Studio of Argentina; Denmark's A. Film; Phoenix Animation Studios in Toronto, Canada; and The Hollywood Cartoon Company. Mark Swanson Productions did computer animation for the "Yellow Dragons" and the Flapper-Wing-a-Ma-Thing.

Because of time constraints and budget limitations, over ten minutes were cut from the film before its release. One of the deleted scenes featured the voice of Glenn Close, whose character was removed entirely from the final storyline. At around the same time, the studio temporarily changed the working title of The Endangered to the less-ominous Beyond the Yellow Dragons, for fear audiences would find the former title too sensitive for a children's film.

The film's advertising at the time promised a new masterpiece "from the creator of An American Tail". The creator in question was David Kirschner, who served as Tail's executive producer, and actually did create the characters and the story of the film, but ReelViews' James Berardinelli and the Times Union of Albany found it misleading, hoping instead for the likes of Don Bluth or Steven Spielberg.

Hanna-Barbera's feature production unit created to produce this film and Jetsons: The Movie (1990), which also carried an environmental theme, was spun off into another unit under parent company Turner Entertainment, Turner Feature Animation, which produced The Pagemaster and Cats Don't Dance. David Kirschner remained as head of the division. No further theatrical animated films were produced by Hanna-Barbera itself (it would license live-action film adaptations of The Flintstones and Scooby-Doo before being dissolved in 2001).

== Music ==
Once Upon a Forest: Original Soundtrack Album

Film score by James Horner
- Released: 1993
- Genres: Film score, orchestral
- Length: 67:18
- Label: Fox Records

Professional ratings
Review scores
Source	Rating
Allmusic	link
Movie Music UK	link

The score for Once Upon a Forest was one of several that composer James Horner wrote for animated films of the late '80s and early '90s. Three songs were written for it: "Please Wake Up", "He's Gone/He's Back", and the closing credits track, "Once Upon a Time with Me". The songs were performed by the London Symphony Orchestra, with contributions from Ben Vereen and Michael Crawford. The soundtrack, released by Fox Records, has been out of print since its publisher went out of business in the mid-1990s.

=== Songs ===
Original songs performed in the film include:

No.	Title	Performer(s)	Length
1.	"Please Wake Up"	Michael Crawford
2.	"He's Gone/He's Back"	Ben Vereen & Andrae Crouch Singers
3.	"Once Upon a Time with Me"	Florence Warner Jones

== Release and reception ==
The Miami Herald took note of the film's potential competition with Universal Studios' already-established summer hit, Jurassic Park; the tabloid wrote that it did not have a chance to compete against the former despite calling Once Upon a Forest a "delightful family film". Ultimately, Once Upon a Forest did poorly in theaters: after opening with $2.2 million at 1,487 venues, it made $6.5 million at the North American box office, just over half its budget. The film holds a 22% rating on Rotten Tomatoes based on 23 reviews. The critical consensus reads: "Inert animation and generically chipper characters rob Once Upon a Forest of any personality despite its well-intentioned message and critter appeal for very young children".

Fox Video's original VHS and laserdisc issue of the film, released on September 21, 1993, proved successful on the home video market for several months. On October 28, 2002, it premiered on DVD, also available on VHS in the UK with the content presented in fullscreen and widescreen formats. The original trailer was included as the only extra on the Australian Region 4 version.

Once Upon a Forest was nominated for an Annie Award for Best Animated Feature in 1993. It won an MPSE Golden Reel Award for Best Sound Editing.

== Merchandise ==
Once Upon a Forest was adapted into book form by Elizabeth Isele, with illustrations by Carol Holman Grosvenor, the film's production designer. The tie-in was issued by Turner Publishing and distributed by Andrews McMeel, a month prior to the film's release (ISBN 1-878-68587-2).

The multimedia company Sanctuary Woods also released a MS-DOS point-and-click adventure game based on the film, on CD-ROM and floppy disk for IBM computers; Beth Agnew served as its adapter. Many elements of the game stayed faithful to the original source material. None of the original voice actors reprised their roles as the voice acting was recorded in Canada.

== See also ==
- List of works produced by Hanna-Barbera Productions
- List of 20th Century Fox theatrical animated feature films
- Lists of animated feature films
- List of American films of 1993
- FernGully: The Last Rainforest, another animated film released by Fox with an environmental theme
