= Bartlett (TV series) =

- Created by: Martin Edwards; Chrissy Mazzeo
- Written by: Martin Edwards
- Directed by: Martin Edwards
- Starring: Anthony Veneziale; Chrissy Mazzeo; Don Reed; Eirinie Carson; Utkarsh Ambudkar; Lin-Manuel Miranda
- Composer: Peter Golub
- Country of origin: United States
- Original language: English
- No. of seasons: 1
- No. of episodes: 6

Production
- Executive producers: Evan Shapiro; Chrissy Mazzeo; Anthony Veneziale
- Producer: Rivkah Beth Medow
- Cinematography: Justin Chin
- Editor: Collin Kriner
- Production company: A Bartlett A Day LLC

Original release
- Network: YouTube TV
- Release: January 30, 2018

Bartlett is a comedy streaming series created by writer/director Martin Edwards and executive producer Chrissy Mazzeo. It was released on January 30, 2018 on Amazon Prime. It is now also available on YouTube, Tubi, and Plex.

The series is a satire of advertising and Silicon Valley culture, set in a failing San Francisco ad agency known as Agency SF. It revolves around a struggling creative director who is desperate to quit his job and become a full time musician, but feels compelled to right several wrongs first.

Bartlett was an official selection of the 2017 New York Television Festival.

== Cast ==
The cast:

- Anthony Veneziale as Roger Newhouse, a creative director ready to follow his musical passion, but held back by the need to “fix things” with all the people he’s wronged.
- Chrissy Mazzeo as Maggie Knowland, Roger's former creative partner and lover who is asked by Bob to come back and fix the mess that her ex has wrought.
- Don Reed as Bob Freeman, Roger's boss who is torn between firing his protege and proving his leadership to his own boss.
- Eirinie Carson as Caitlin Bodley, the only account executive left at Agency SF, whose loyalty to Roger may be her Achilles heel.
- Utkarsh Ambudkar as Sanjay Kahn, Maggie's talented and driven ad executive boyfriend who struggles with empathy.
- Lin-Manuel Miranda as Jesus, a Shakespeare-quoting freelancer on a mission to help Roger win the pitch that could fix everything.
- Irene Sofia Lucio as Mary, Jesus' over-enthusiastic collaborator.
- Nate Duncan as Hans, Roger's German mechanic who literally holds the keys to one of Roger's last happy places—his vintage Porsche 911.
- Michael X. Sommers as Mike the Plant Guy, a passionate horticulturalist who originally inspires Roger to follow his dream, and then gets fired.

== Episodes ==
Season 1
No.	Title	Original air date
1	"Excuse Me While I Find My Pants"	January 30, 2018
Ad agency boss Bob arrives from New York for a showdown with Roger, whose lackluster leadership has sent the San Francisco office into a death spiral. Meanwhile, Maggie is trying to convince current boyfriend Sanjay to attend couples therapy.
2	"The Awesome Wisdom of Sir Richard Branson"	January 30, 2018
Maggie’s unexpected arrival at the agency exposes Bob’s plan to re-install her as the new creative director. Caitlin reveals that she and Roger have secretly landed the coveted Pear pitch, forcing Bob to keep Roger on.
3	"Jesus Saves (Sinners and Ad People)"	January 30, 2018
Maggie declines to work on Roger's Pear pitch, only to have Sanjay invite her to work on his own Pear pitch, which she warily accepts to do. Desperate for help, Roger brings in an oddball creative team. Caitlin begins to question her loyalty to Roger.
4	"Epiphany with a Sunflower Butter Sandwich"	January 30, 2018
Determined to woo back Maggie with a nostalgic drive in his vintage Porsche, Roger visits Hans, his German mechanic. Maggie joins Sanjay’s all-male creative team, only to mock them and then leave. Bob and Caitlin find common ground.
5	"The Healing Power of Maggie's Underwear"	January 30, 2018
Out of time and ideas, Roger arrives at Maggie’s apartment to beg for her help with his pitch. The two play a game of cat and mouse, with Roger trying to show his better side as Maggie reviews all of Roger’s professional and personal missteps.
6	"We Are All Enoch Bartlett -- We Are All Liars"	January 30, 2018
Worried that Maggie has double-crossed him, Roger hurries to Pear Computer with the help of Hans. Bob tries to convince Caitlin to go to New York. Maggie and Roger find opportunities to start over.

== Production ==
Bartlett is an independent production. It was produced by Rivkah Beth Medow and executive produced by Chrissy Mazzeo, Anthony Veneziale and Evan Shaprio, who previously worked with Veneziale, Utkarsh Ambudkar and Lin-Manuel Miranda on the Seeso comedy improv series Freestyle Love Supreme.

The series was written and directed by Martin Edwards and based on his play, Pitch Perfect, which was developed at Berkeley Rep and produced by Central Works Theater in 2013. Both projects were inspired by his time as a creative director at Grey Advertising in New York and San Francisco.
