= Don Reed (comedian) =

American comedian, actor, and writer

- Born: Donald Gene Reed; November 23, 1959 (age 66); Oakland, California, U.S.
- Education: Fremont High School
- Alma mater: Chabot College; UCLA
- Occupations: comedian, television actor and writer
- Years active: 1980–present

Donald Gene Reed (born November 23, 1959) is an American actor, writer, storyteller, author, producer, director and comedian.

== Early life ==
Reed grew up in Oakland, California, and attended Fremont High School. Additionally he attended Chabot Junior College in Hayward, California, before being recruited to UCLA for intercollegiate speech and debate competition, where he became a national champion in competitive events: Speech to Entertain, Poetry and Dramatic readings.

== Career ==
In the fall of 1988, Don Reed was performing stand-up comedy at NACA and impressed comedian Sinbad so much he helped Reed get signed for two episodes of a television spin-off of The Cosby Show, titled A Different World, on which he played "Chip St. Charles", whom Denise Huxtable had a crush on. This was Reed's television debut; he left the show in 1989.

After A Different World, Reed was cast as "Fingers" in a film called Dance to Win, which was released on December 1, 1989, in the United States. Reed also appeared on the HBO television program Dream On in 1990, then he appeared on Robert Townsend's ventures: an HBO television special Robert Townsend and His Partners in Crime (1991) and The Meteor Man (1993) as a drug worker.

=== Impressions ===
- Sherman Hemsley (as George Jefferson from The Jeffersons)
- Mario Lopez
- Todd Bridges
- Ernest Lee Thomas
- Michael Jordan
- Chris Rock
- Bill Cosby
- Richard Pryor
- Bobby Brown
- Michael Jackson
- Mike Tyson
- Luther Vandross

Reed was nominated for three Primetime Emmy Awards: one for Dream On, The Cosby Show and Robert Townsend and His Partners in Crime in 1989.

Reed was an advertising & promotion executive at NBC, for two years, and then he did voice-work for cartoons such as Disney's Gargoyles, Spider-Man and The Real Adventures of Jonny Quest.

Reed's movie credits include: Unleashed Fear of a Black Hat and Once Upon a Forest. Reed also joined the cast of NBC's The Rerun Show. His showcase of impressions included Mike Tyson, Sherman Hemsley, Todd Bridges, Chris Rock, among others.

In 2008, he debuted a solo autobiographical show titled East 14th: True Tales of a Reluctant Player and has presented a total of 5 solo shows altogether. In fall 2009, he became the warm-up comic for The Jay Leno Show. He is the first African American warm-up comedian for a major late night show – The Tonight Show with Jay Leno – and performed stand-up to warm up the studio audience for over 1,000 episodes.

In 2016 he won an award from Snap Judgment for NPR/WNYC Performance of the Year. Later that year Theater Bay Area gave his show East 14th the 2016 TBA award for Outstanding Solo Show. In the same year, Reed co-starred in Amazon Prime streaming comedy series, Bartlett, co-starring Broadway phenom Lin Manuel Miranda, creator of Hamilton. In 2019 Don Reed was approached by writer/director/filmmaker Robert Townsend to co-produce his one man, theatrical hit "Living the Shuffle."

In November 2024, Reed created and began hosting and producing "Redwood Nights: Storytelling Under the Stars" at Deer Park Villa in Fairfax, CA. Most recently in 2025, Don became a Simon & Schuster author. He will write his memoir based on some of his numerous award winning one man shows ("East 14th, Can You Dig It?, The Never Too Late Show").
