= List of SuperKitties episodes =

SuperKitties (known as SuperKitties: Su-Purr Charged in season 2 and SuperKitties: Su-Purr Wild in season 3) is an American animated superhero musical television series created by Paula Rosenthal for Disney Jr. Produced by Sony Pictures Television Kids, the series premiered on January 11, 2023.

Each episode is titled in their beginnings with "The SuperKitties and the..." in the series itself. However, this list will go by the titles shown on online sources to avoid repetition.

== Series overview ==
Season	Subtitle	Episodes	Segments	Originally released	
Season	Subtitle	Episodes	Segments	First released	Last released
1	—N/a	26	50	January 11, 2023	January 19, 2024
2	Su-Purr Charged	24	48	April 5, 2024	August 1, 2025
3	Su-Purr Wild	26	TBA	September 22, 2025	TBA

== Episodes ==
=== Season 1 (2023–24) ===
No. overall	No. in season	Title	Written by	Storyboarded by	Original release date	Prod. code	U.S. viewers (millions)
1	1	"The Great Yarn Caper"	Story by : Evan Gore & Heather Lombard; Teleplay by : Leah Gotcsik & Kris Marvin Hughes	Francisco Avalos	January 11, 2023	101	0.18
1	1	"Get the Boot"	Story by : Evan Gore, Heather Lombard & Mia Resella; Teleplay by : Nick Confalone & Kris Marvin Hughes	Chiara Finotello	January 11, 2023	101	0.18
The Great Yarn Caper: Pets around Kittydale, including Bitsy, have their yarn-based items stolen by Cat Burglar after he loses his favorite blanket. Get the Boot: Lab Rat and Otto invent a giant boot to smush all of the flowers in Kittydale in retaliation for a flower they liked getting stepped on.
2	2	"Fireworks Fright"	Story by : Evan Gore & Heather Lombard; Teleplay by : Leah Gotcsik & Sarah Mullervy	Peter Huggan	January 12, 2023 (Note: This episode was first released on Disney+ on January 11, 2023.)	102	0.10
2	2	"Cheese Trees"	Leah Gotcsik & Sarah Mullervy	Chiara Finotello	January 12, 2023	102	0.10
Fireworks Fright: It is Fireworks Night in Kittydale, and neither Sparks or Mr. Puppypaws are excited because they both dislike loud noises, so the latter steals all the fireworks before the ceremony. Cheese Trees: Lab Rat and Otto are responsible for things suddenly turning into cheese, using a device called the Cheeserator, which is bad news for Ginny because she doesn't like sticky stuff, since an incident involving peanut butter. Now she must stop Lab Rat after the others get stuck in her cheese.
3	3	"Silent Surprise"	Story by : Evan Gore & Heather Lombard; Teleplay by : Nick Confalone & Ghia Godfree	Graeme Lee	January 13, 2023	103	0.20
3	3	"Fufu Snafu"	Story by : Evan Gore & Heather Lombard; Teleplay by : Leah Gotcsik & Corey Powell	Sarrah Campbell	January 13, 2023	103	0.20
Silent Surprise: The Singing Squirrels concert is tonight, but Zsa Zsa uses her Voice-Be-Gone Spray before the event, so everyone will have to hear her sing instead. Sparks, the Squirrels biggest fan, must confront his stage fright to help his teammates stop her. Fufu Snafu: A statue of a famous cat named Fufu is set to be displayed at the Kittydale Museum the next day, but Bitsy is soon accused of stealing it by the museum's guard dog Magda, after she sneaks off to see it for herself. The other Superkitties soon learn that Cat Burglar is the true thief, since he too, could not wait to see the exhibit.
4	4	"Super-Fan"	Ghia Godfree	Sunk-Ik Cho	January 20, 2023	104	0.24
4	4	"Bubble Bother"	Yotam Tubul	Peter Huggan	January 20, 2023	104	0.24
Super-Fan: The SuperKitties find a lost kitten named Pickles. They must take him home, but only after stopping Mr. Puppypaws from robbing a treat truck. Bubble Bother: Zsa Zsa turns the Kittydale water tower into her personal bubble bath, and it affects water across the city as it comes out bubbly causing nobody else to be able to use the water.
5	5	"Groggy Groundhogs"	Laura Kleinbaum & M.A. Larson	Chiara Finotello	January 27, 2023	108	0.17
5	5	"Go Birdy"	David Grubstick	Graeme Lee	January 27, 2023	108	0.17
Groggy Groundhogs: Lab Rat and Otto kick the groundhogs out of their home after their own home disappears. Go Birdy: Using a special spray, Zsa Zsa makes the town behave like birds on Kittydale Day because she feels left out of the celebration.
6	6	"Blueberry Bonanza"	Princess Daazhraii Johnson	Peter Huggan	February 3, 2023	111	0.25
6	6	"Snow Day"	Vera Starbard	Sunk-Ik Cho	February 3, 2023	111	0.25
Blueberry Bonanza: The Blueberry Bonanza is about to begin in Kittydale, but Zsa Zsa and her squad steal all of the blueberries to make Zsa Zsa's own personal foot cream to keep her talons in good condition. Snow Day: It's Bitsy's first snow day in Kittydale. Everything is going fine until Lab Rat gets rid of the snow with her Snow-a-Go-Go ray because she cannot find snow pants for Otto.
7	7	"Have a Ball"	Laura Kleinbaum	Kelli Bort	February 10, 2023	105	0.17
7	7	"Zsa Zsa Zoom"	Kris Marvin Hughes	Graeme Lee	February 10, 2023	105	0.17
Have a Ball: Ginny hurts her left leg while getting Chibi down from a tree where the vet puts a cone on her so that she won't lick her paw. With Ginny disabled, the other Superkitties are forced to carry on without her and stop Mr. Puppypaws' game of catch with his Brazilian Ball Launcher. Zsa Zsa Zoom: A toy car that Peanut was supposed to be watching for her owner Nadia is stolen by Zsa Zsa's budgies. She then takes it for a joyride because she hurt her wing. The SuperKitties must return it before Nadia finishes her lunch.
8	8	"Missing Mr. Greenie"	Sarah Mullervy	Peter Huggan	February 17, 2023 (Note: This episode was first released on Disney+ on February 15, 2023.)	106	0.14
8	8	"Piano Problem"	Patrick Rieger	Kelli Bort	February 17, 2023	106	0.14
Missing Mr. Greenie: Mr. Puppypaws steals Bitsy's favorite toy Mr. Greenie in an effort to trick the SuperKitties into joining his birthday party, since he has no one else to celebrate with. Piano Problem: Cat Burglar snatches the piano of Poochini, the pet of famous pianist named Petcini after his piano is destroyed. To carry it off, he also steals the SuperKitty Copter.
9	9	"Treat Truck Trouble"	Morgan Von Ancken	Sunk-Ik Cho	February 24, 2023	107	0.18
9	9	"Leapin' Laser"	Story by : Monique D. Hall; Teleplay by : Kris Marvin Hughes	Sarrah Campbell	February 24, 2023	107	0.18
Treat Truck Trouble: Mr. Puppypaws uses a device to hypnotize Treat Truck owner Chef Marci into only making dog treats for him since his owner never stops at the Treat Truck to get him treats. Leapin' Laser: Tired of kittens ruining all of her schemes, Lab Rat mesmerizes all the cats in Kittydale with a big laser pointer, so she can mail them away. The SuperKitties try to stop her and Otto, but it proves tough after Buddy accidentally breaks Sparks' SuperKitty Kit, and doesn't tell him.
10	10	"Toy-Tastrophe"	Yotam Tubul	Chiara Finotello	March 3, 2023	110	0.17
10	10	"Night Light"	Charlotte Fullerton	Kelli Bort	March 3, 2023	110	0.17
Toy-Tastrophe: Mr. Puppypaws steals all the toys in Kittydale as part of a plan to impress a new poodle in town named Miss Poochytail. Night Light: Bitsy is afraid of the dark and Ginny gives her advice on how to get over it. Meanwhile, Lab Rat uses a new invention to turn off the power system in Kittydale so that Otto won't get scared by shadows.
11	11	"Burble Bungle"	Scott Gray	Max Salazar	March 10, 2023	112	0.15
11	11	"Sticky Situation"	Amy Keating Rogers	Graeme Lee	March 10, 2023	112	0.15
Burble Bungle: Buddy is fascinated by a new toy called a Burble as he gets fascinated with one that was left behind by Tiana as Amara holds it in the lost and found. When he finds it and more Burbles stealing cheeses, Buddy calls in the rest of the SuperKitties for help. They find that Lab Rat is responsible for the reprogrammed Burbles. When the Burble reprogramming goes wrong, the SuperKitties must work together with Lab Rat to deactivate the Burbles Sticky Situation: After Mr. Puppypaws feels insulted that the other dogs don't find his stick as special as he does, he invents the Chippy-Chopper to devour all the wood in Kittydale to make a stick worth admiring.
12	12	"Lab Rat Lift-Off"	Morgan Von Ancken	Kelli Bort	March 17, 2023	113	0.20
12	12	"Rockin' Rockhound"	Cindy Morrow	Chiara Finotello	March 17, 2023	113	0.20
Lab Rat Lift-Off: Polaris the Astro Cat, who Ginny is a big fan of, is going on a trip to the Moon. Thinking that the Moon is made of cheese, Lab Rat plans to get into the rocket instead of Polaris in order to get to the Moon. After Lab Rat and Otto trap Polaris in a truck, the SuperKitties rescue her and work with her to thwart Lab Rat. Rockin' Rockhound: The SuperKitties are called in by Magda to help guard the Sky Jewel which was found by her nephew Rockland Rockhound and is on display on the museum. Despite Sparks' security system, the Sky Jewel is stolen by Zsa Zsa and her Budgies in order to replace her lost cameo broach.
13	13	"Hole Lot of Trouble"	Kris Marvin Hughes	Graeme Lee	April 28, 2023	114	0.22
13	13	"Roboctopus"	M.A Larson	Sunk-Ik Cho	April 28, 2023	114	0.22
Hole Lot of Trouble: While preparing for the Fun Run, the Superkitties find out that Mr. Puppypaws is using a new invention called Sir Scoops-a-Lot to dig up holes after Quacksley went missing. Roboctopus: After Sparks upgrades the SuperKitty Kit to move faster than Bitsy, she worries she'll be replaced by it. During an encounter with Lab Rat, who has built a new device called Roboctopus in order to steal cheese scraps, Bitsy finds out she and Otto are in the same situation, thinking their friends have replaced them.
14	14	"Bird Bop"	David Grubstick	Peter Huggan	May 12, 2023	115	0.13
14	14	"Pickle Problem"	Ghia Godfree	Jordan Munson	May 12, 2023	115	0.13
Bird Bop: The SuperKitties must stop Zsa-Zsa when she hacks all of the electronics in the city, making them play her music video. Pickle Problem: Pickles keeps making up emergencies to get the SuperKitties to come to his picnic. Then, Cat Burglar steals his food and the SuperKitties are hesitant to believe him.
15	15	"Cat Tree Caper"	Sarah Mullervy	Kelli Bort	June 2, 2023 (Note: This episode was first released on Disney+ on May 17, 2023.)	116	0.12
15	15	"Showstopper"	Vera Starbard	Chiara Finotello	June 2, 2023	116	0.12
Cat Tree Caper: The kittens of Kittydale are having their cat trees stolen including Sparks. The SuperKitties soon discover that Cat Burglar is using the cat trees as a tower to help his grandmother, Granny Catarina get down from a fire escape after she had secretly stolen a collar that belonged to Mr. Puppypaws. Showstopper: After being annoyed by the other noisy animals at Kittydale park during the Singing Squirrels vocal warm up, Mr. Puppypaws kidnaps them and takes them to his home so they can put on a private concert for him. It is up to the SuperKitties to rescue the Singing Squirrels.
16	16	"Sparks vs. Sparks"	Morgan Von Ancken	Graeme Lee	June 9, 2023	118	0.12
16	16	"Poochy Playdate"	Yotam Tubul	Sunk-Ik Cho	June 9, 2023	118	0.12
Sparks vs. Sparks: As the SuperKitties spend time in their playground, an imposter Sparks is going around stealing food from Chef Marci's treat truck. When the SuperKitties are informed of it by Sam and Eddie, they suspect that someone is framing Sparks. More complaints arrive from Peanut and Whiskers upon their stuff getting stolen, the SuperKitties find the imposter Sparks is actually Cat Burglar in disguise to steal some goodies. Poochy Playdate: Buddy is bothered by Bitsy wanting to spend time with him and Sparks. Mr. Puppypaws plans to have a playdate with Miss Poochytail, but does not want other puppies partaking in it, so he makes use of his Yum-Yum-Smell-o-Blaster to cause all the dogs except for himself and Miss Poochytail to be lured into a warehouse with the smell of bacon.
17	17	"Voice With No Choice"	Scott Gray	Kelli Bort	June 23, 2023	117	0.10
17	17	"Brother Battle"	David Grubstick	Peter Huggan	June 23, 2023	117	0.10
Voice With No Choice: The SuperKitties are called in to solve the mysteries of the animals speaking like instruments. They find that Zsa Zsa is responsible where she is using her Musical Instrument Spray to make them her personal instruments after her cell phone, which she calls her "music player", broke. Brother Battle: Sparks and Buddy get into a fight over the recent "Brother Says" rules and have a falling out. The SuperKitties are called in when the Burbles are stealing things. With the Burbles upgraded to emit strong bubbles, Sparks and Buddy must reconcile in order to get out of the bubble and help to defeat Lab Rat.
18	18	"Lost Spark"	Mario López-Cordero	Sunk-Ik Cho	July 14, 2023	119	0.12
18	18	"Bitsy Bellyache"	Nick Confalone & Princess Daazhraii Johnson	Chiara Finotello	July 14, 2023	119	0.12
Lost Spark: Rockland contacts the SuperKitties informing them that Cat Burglar has stolen his pillow. After being knocked off the SuperKitty Kit during a pursuit on Cat Burglar who's been stealing things around Kittydale to make his warehouse lair comfortable for his grandmother's visit, Sparks becomes nervous of riding it again. Now Sparks must work to get back on the SuperKitty Kit when the other SuperKitties fall into Cat Burglar's trap. Bitsy Bellyache: Chef Marci has made new hot air balloon-shaped treats for the Hot Air Balloon Festival. Sick from indulging in the hot air balloon-shaped treats, Bitsy's belly keeps rumbling, letting her know she isn't feeling well, as she is also unable to help her fellow SuperKitties when Lab Rat makes the Treat Truck float away with her No-Stay-Float-Away-Today Laser Ray so she can work on a painting of Otto in peace and quiet.
19	19	"Amara's Tiara"	M.A. Larson	Graeme Lee	July 28, 2023 (Note: This episode was first released on Disney+ on July 19, 2023.)	120	N/A
19	19	"Furball Blooper"	Sarah Mullervy	Chiara Finotello	July 28, 2023	120	N/A
Amara's Tiara: Amara gets a special delivery, a tiara from her mom which soon entices Buddy to try it on. He goes to tell the other Superkitties he took it, knowing what he did was wrong, only for it to vanish, along with a bunch of other sparkly clothes. They soon discover that Zsa Zsa's squad of budgies snatched all of these things, so Zsa Zsa would have something to wear for the Songbird Soirée. Furball Blooper: After the SuperKitties save Sam and Eddie, who got stuck in a runway garbage can, Buddy's suit suffers a rip and malfunctions, leaving him unable to do the Furball Blitz. Sparks fixes it up, and adds a new move called the Furball Boing, but the suit ends up being too uncomfortable for Buddy. It becomes a bigger issue when the SuperKitties are called to the museum to stop Lab Rat and Otto, who have used her new invention called the Nappity-Zappity to put everybody to sleep, so they could break into the new space exhibit and steal the blueprints to the first Kittydale rocket, so she could achieve her dream of being the first rat on the moon.
20	20	"Fruit Loot"	Ta'riq Fisher	Graeme Lee	August 18, 2023	122	0.13
20	20	"Buddy Wanna-Be"	Michael Goldberg	Hannah Bosnian	August 18, 2023	122	0.13
Fruit Loot: Zsa Zsa runs out of Orange Juice Feather Fluff, so she asks the Budgies to get some oranges. After they tried and failed to find perfect oranges for her, the Budgies feel unappreciated and fly away forcing Zsa Zsa to steal oranges herself. Meanwhile, Sparks makes a Goldfish Glider for the other SuperKitties who like the glider. They get ideas to change its design while having to contend with Zsa Zsa's orange heist. Buddy Wanna-Be: Mr. Puppypaws and Miss Poochytail come across the scene of Buddy helping get a rock off of a groundhog's tail. This makes Mr. Puppypaws believe that Ms. Poochytail likes superheroes more than she likes him. This leads to Mr. Puppypaws into fooling the animals of Kittydale into taking unsafe balloon rides, pretending to be a superhero named Mr. Super Puppypaws with Quacksley as The Quack and saving the animals when the balloons get caught in trees. Meanwhile, Bitsy, knowing that her super Speed did not help the groundhog, decides to be like Buddy.
21	21	"Bundle of Bitsies"	David Grubstick	Chiara Finotello	September 15, 2023	124	0.10
21	21	"Frantic Flyer"	Sarah Mullervy	Jordan Munson	September 15, 2023	124	0.10
Bundle of Bitsies: After the SuperKitties stop Lab Rat and Otto from stealing mustard for their pretzel, they take her new Copycat device back to their HQ. As they head home, Sparks claims that now all their stomachs are "talking", and all of them except Bitsy goes upstairs. Bitsy then tries using it to make multiple fish treats but accidentally makes two copies of herself that steal the invention and cause chaos in Kittydale by copying everything and everyone. Now the SuperKitties must work to round up the Bitsy copies even when Lab Rat and Otto plan to steal some honey for their pretzel. Frantic Flyer: Zsa Zsa has planned a tropical island vacation for herself and the budgies but doesn't feel like putting in the effort to practice flying for a long trip. So she plans a distraction for the SuperKitties by stealing the water from the park's fountain just as they were perfecting their superhero skills, especially Buddy with his Furball Boing, in order to steal Sparks' SuperKitty Kit. However, she does not know how to operate the SuperKitty Kit and breaks it, sending her zooming through the sky with no way to stop it. Now the SuperKitties must rescue Zsa Zsa and repair the SuperKitty Kit's voice command.
22	22	"Howloween Cat"	Nick Confalone	Hannah Bosnian & Graeme Lee	September 25, 2023	123	0.13
On Halloween, Amara is handing treats out to the children. After Amara leaves for Taylor's Halloween party, the cats give Bitsy her first Howloween as she learns about the Legend of the Howloween Cat where a single cat howling at the Moon to let the pets of Kittydale know that she is on the prowl for their treats. If anyone is caught by the Howloween Cat, they will be turned into a pumpkin. Zippy claims that she had seen the Howloween Cat before as Sparks and Buddy shoot down that claim. When the Howloween Cat is sighted and Howloween treats, the SuperKitties are called in to investigate where the treats have also been stolen from their clients and Cat Burglar. They discover that the Howloween Cat is actually a robot piloted by Lab Rat who stole the Howloween treats for Otto's family who is visiting from the ocean.
23	23	"Cheesenado"	Yotam Tubul	Graeme Lee & Hannah Bosnian	October 6, 2023 (Note: This episode was first released on Disney+ on October 4, 2023.)	126	0.16
23	23	"Talented Troublemaker"	Cindy Morrow	Jordan Munson & Max Salazar	October 6, 2023	126	0.16
Cheesenado: Bitsy is told by Renata that she and her chicks will be flying south for the winter soon and is devastated about the news. She returns to the Cavern, crying to the other SuperKitties about it... until they get a call from the mother robin herself about a weird orange wind that is keeping them from leaving. The SuperKitties go to the park where they encounter a remote-controlled tornado made by Lab Rat and Otto specifically designed to steal cheese. Although Bitsy is reluctant to stop the Cheesenado because she doesn't want Renata and her chicks to leave, she learns that her friends are always in her heart, even when they're far away. Talented Troublemaker: Buddy and Bitsy hold a contest to see who will win a squeaky ball. Buddy pulls a distraction to give himself an advantage, but Ginny tells him that what he did was cheating. When Buddy tries to tell Bitsy the truth, the SuperKitties are called in by Jeebie, Chibi, and Doreen at the Kittydale Pet Talent Contest after the props for their acts get stolen by Mr. Puppypaws who is using his Voice Change-O-Matic to also distract everyone at the event so he can sabotage every other pet's performances and win the trophy for himself.
24	24	"Merry Mousemas"	Sarah Mullervy	Sunk-Ik Cho & Peter Huggan	November 28, 2023	109	0.16
On Christmas Eve, Bitsy is excited in the hopes Santa Claus will bring her a Kitty Castle. But the SuperKitties' holiday fun is interrupted by a thief in a Santa costume stealing everyones presents, including Bitsy's. They soon discover that the thief in question is Cat Burglar and chase him through Kittydale into an alleyway. They find out he stole the presents to give a family of mice named the McWhiskers a home of which he is their uncle. Bitsy lets the mice keep the castle. After returning all the presents, Bitsy gives Cat Burglar a piano-shaped ornament before the SuperKitties head home to the Purr'N'Play.
25	25	"Missing Hot Dog"	Scott Gray & Nick Confalone	Hannah Bosnian & Sunk-Ik Cho	December 8, 2023 (Note: This episode was first released on Disney+ on December 6, 2023.)	125	0.14
25	25	"Mysterious Magician"	Morgan Von Ancken	Chiara Finotello	December 8, 2023	125	0.14
Missing Hot Dog: Bitsy is enjoying some quality time with the Purr'N'Play visitors until Amara brings in a red-furred dachshund pup which they name Hotdog. She's concerned that everyone loves him more than her as even the other SuperKitties get in on adoring the lost dog. They then get a call from Sam and Eddie that actual hot dogs are being snatched and make their way over to the docks with Hotdog as a stowaway. The thief reveals themself to be Mr. Puppypaws who's been stealing the hot dogs to give himself an endless supply of them. After cornering Mr. Puppypaws behind the Purr'N'Play, they find Hotdog's owner and learn that his real name is Frankie. Mysterious Magician: Cat Burglar and Granny Catarina are staking out Abraca-Dan's van with the former planning to use his tricks to steal things. Granny Catarina is uninterested as she's been stealing things from Kittydale since Cat Burglar was a baby, he did not see how magic could help them out. Cat Burglar sets out to prove to her that it has some merit. Meanwhile, all the SuperKitties, except Ginny, are planning to see Abraca-Dan's show when they get a call from his rabbit Valour about the props being stolen. They find their friends in the park watching a magic show performed by Cat Burglar and Granny Catarina which is just a ploy to take their things. The SuperKitties try to take them down, but are thwarted by Cat Burglar's magic skills until Ginny's the only one left. She gets some quick lessons from Bitsy, is able to free her teammates, and put the two thieving cats in their place.
26	26	"Vanishing Valentines"	Ghia Godfree	Sunk-Ik Cho	January 19, 2024	121	0.12
26	26	"Golden Gift"	Yotam Tubul	Chiara Finotello	January 19, 2024	121	0.12
Vanishing Valentines: On Valentine's Day, Ginny, Sparks, Buddy, and Bitsy watch the children make Valentine cards for Amara. Bitsy makes Valentines for Ginny, Sparks, and Buddy. The SuperKitties are contacted by Whiskers and Boomer who state that their Valentines to each other have disappeared like the Valentine cards that Bitsy made. They follow the clues to Kittydale Park where they discover that Mr. Puppypaws has become Prince Puppypaws and has created a robotic dragon called Dragonbreath the Glittery in order to rule Valentine's Day because he and Quacksley never received a Valentine from anyone. Golden Gift: Amara gave some golden bells to Bitsy. Impressed by them, Ginny is allowed to have one of the golden bells as they wear them like friendship bells. That's when Ginny and Bitsy sings about what friendship is like. Unfortunately, Ginny accidentally breaks her bell when challenged to a race by Buddy as Ginny is worried that Bitsy will become upset upon hearing what happened. The SuperKitties are contacted by different animals stating that their golden stuff has been stolen. They discover that Cat Burglar is responsible for the gold theft in order to make a golden dance floor for his lair that he can do his tap dancing on.

=== Season 2: Su-Purr Charged (2024–25) ===
No. overall	No. in season	Title	Written by	Storyboarded by	Original release date	Prod. code	U.S. viewers (millions)
27	1	"Jumbo Rat"	Kris Marvin Hughes	Marlon Deane & Mirco Chen	April 5, 2024	201	0.09
27	1	"New Friend Fiasco"	Yotam Tubul	Nathan Affolter & Alex Leung	April 5, 2024	201	0.09
Jumbo Rat: Lab Rat and Otto appear outside of a store that is selling jelly as she criticizes Otto's claims that it can be served with peanut butter. Using her Go-Big-or-Go-Small Ray, Lab Rat instructs Otto to use the green button to make her small only for Otto to make Lab Rat grow big by pushing the yellow button. Meanwhile, Amara gets a new product for the cats that involves dispensing cat treats as Bitsy declares herself too small to work it. Alerted of Lab Rat's rampage by Chibi, the SuperKitties in their Su-Purr Charged new suits must work to get Lab Rat back to small size. New Friend Fiasco: While climbing a tree, Ginny, Sparks, Buddy, and Bitsy meet a new cat named Ruby who is named after her ruby jewel and is the best climber. Ruby teaches Bitsy some tricks as Ginny is depressed that Ruby is teaching Bitsy instead of her. The SuperKitties get a call from Sam and Eddie about a new pet salon where animals go in and none of them are coming out. They discover that Cat Burglar and Granny Catarina are responsible in order to make a gem-encrusted coat for Granny Catarina. Ruby stumbles upon their scheme as well as Zsa Zsa. Now the SuperKitties must thwart Cat Burglar and Granny Catarina's plot and rescue everyone.
28	2	"Dancing Piggy"	Jeff Poliquin & Sarah Mullervy	Bora Moon & Alicia de Koning	April 12, 2024	202	0.07
28	2	"Super Helpers"	Ghia Godfree	Alicia Kok & Brian Wong	April 12, 2024	202	0.07
Dancing Piggy: The SuperKitties are preparing for the Kittydale Dance Party. For Buddy's dance partner, Sparks creates Wiggles the Dancing Robo-Pig. This is witnessed by Zsa Zsa and the budgies as Zsa Zsa sends them to distract the SuperKitties while she steals Wiggles so that Wiggles can be her dance partner. They get tipped off by Sam and Eddie who inform them which way Wiggles "flew" as the SuperKitties work to reclaim Wiggles from Zsa Zsa. Super Helpers: The SuperKitties train some local animals to become Super Helpers. Pickles has trouble crossing the beam when overseen by Bitsy. Mr. Puppypaws watches from afar as he comes up with a plan to send them far away. Pickles witnesses the claw from Mr. Puppypaws' stroller snatch all the training equipment. The SuperKitties and their helpers fall into Mr. Puppypaws' trap on a boat called the Paddle Paws Express that will take them to a faraway island where they won't bother them. Bitsy and Pickles managed to evade the trap where they make use of the balance beams causing Pickles to master the balance beam to help rescue everyone.
29	3	"Museum Mayhem"	Ta'riq Fisher	Craig George & James Roney	April 19, 2024	203	0.09
29	3	"Big Dig"	David Grubstick	Nathan Affolter & Marlon Deane	April 19, 2024	203	0.09
Museum Mayhem: In the SuperKitty Cavern, the SuperKitties are doing different paintings. Bitsy suggests that they put their artwork in the Kittydale Art Show at the Kittydale Museum as Ginny is worried that nobody will like her picture. At the Kittydale Art Show, Lab Rat is offended when the people laugh at her painting of her and Otto causing Lab Rat to make plans to take down all the paintings. Magda calls in the SuperKitties to save the Kittydale Art Show before Lab Rat can subject them to the Shreddernator which she mostly uses to shred any cheese she has. Big Dig: In the SuperKitty Cavern, Sparks invents the SuperKitty Slide that can move anything up and down. But, as Sparks was planning to go first, Ginny does, which upsets him. Ginny wonders what's wrong, but he doesn't want to talk about it. Meanwhile, Zsa Zsa and the Budgies have established a sunflower garden to harvest their seeds until it gets ruined by a large dirt mountain caused by Mr. Puppypaws digging for his golden bone. When Zsa Zsa orders the Budgies to take down the dirt mountain, Sam and Eddie call in the SuperKitties to inform them about the dirt mountain that is also causing the local animals to not get into their homes. The SuperKitties must work to thwart both Zsa Zsa and Mr. Puppypaws before things get worse.
30	4	"Copy Hats"	Megan Gonzalez	Mirco Chen & Alex Leung	April 26, 2024	204	0.10
30	4	"Telescope Trouble"	Patrick Rieger	Alicia de Koning & Bora Moon	April 26, 2024	204	0.10
Copy Hats: Cat Burglar and Granny Catarina are enjoying food in an alley until they had to duck out of sight when a woman takes a selfie and gets Granny Catarina's hat in the picture where she makes copies of it for the animals. Amara unveils the Purr 'n Go to bring the playing with the cats to all of Kittydale as Bitsy and Buddy get the same hats. Cat Burglar puts his plan into action by stealing the hats from all the animals so that nobody can copy Granny Catarina's look. Telescope Trouble: At night, Sparks tells Buddy about what a telescope is at the time when the Moon will be the Red Super Moon. Upon meeting up with Polaris, they are shown the new Kittydale Telescope as Buddy works to master operating it with comical results. Things get worse when the Kitty Telescope and Polaris are stolen. The SuperKitties discover that Lab Rat and Otto, in their flying cheese cycle, are responsible. They want to use the Kittydale Telescope on their science mission so that Lab Rat can finally find proof that the Moon is made of cheese.
31	5	"Cat's Pajamas"	Yotam Tubul	Alicia de Koning & Bora Moon	May 24, 2024	205	N/A
31	5	"Country Kitty"	Jeff Poliquin	Craig George & James Roney	May 24, 2024	205	N/A
Cat's Pajamas: Ginny mentions to Sparks, Buddy, and Bitsy about the new "Welcome to Kittydale" banner as she explains what that the banner that will be hanged at the pier. Meanwhile, Granny Catarina shows Cat Burglar a photo of Cat Burglar and his country cousin Sassy when they were young as Cousin Sassy will be coming over for a sleepover. Knowing that he won't have matching pajamas, Cat Burglar plans to swipe the "Welcome to Kittydale" banner to convert them into pajamas. The SuperKitties are called in by Whiskers to find the stolen banner. When they find Cat Burglar, he states that someone else has stolen it as it turns out that the burglar is someone that Cat Burglar least suspects. Country Kitty: The SuperKitties find out that the Purr 'n Play is getting repainted, causing them to bunk at the Purr 'n Go. This upsets Bitsy because she is homesick. Meanwhile, Cat Burglar and Sassy are building a hay bale maze on the city streets to remind Sassy of her rural home. In doing so however, several animals are trapped and lost in the maze's walls. The SuperKitties are called in where the Kitty Copter ends up damaged. While Sparks stays behind to repair the Kitty Copter, the others enter the maze to stop Cat Burglar and Sassy. Things get worse when Bitsy and Sassy end up trapped in the maze.
32	6	"Bone Bandit"	Michael Goldberg	Alicia Kok & Brian Wong	June 14, 2024	207	N/A
32	6	"Cheesy Chase"	Mike Kubat	Alicia de Koning & Bora Moon	June 14, 2024	207	N/A
Bone Bandit: The SuperKitties work on their group move called the Flying Furball in the SuperKitty Cavern. Unfortunately, Buddy keeps getting distracted during the training. The SuperKitties are contacted by Magda about a dinosaur bone being found in Kittydale Park which is needed to complete the dinosaur bones at Kittydale Museum and needs their help to keep the dinosaur bone safe. The dinosaur bone is soon targeted by Mr. Puppypaws and takes advantage of Buddy's prone to distraction by using a glitter kite on him. With Mr. Puppypaws getting the bone in his possession, Buddy must fight through different distractions to help the other SuperKitties and Magda reclaim the dinosaur bone. Cheesy Chase: After fixing Renata's nest, Sparks shows off what the SuperKitty Kit can do to Renata's chick until the SuperKitty Kit gets broken colliding with a branch. Sparks works to get the SuperKitty Kit fixed so that they can see Brie Fromage's Great Gouda creation. Meanwhile, Lab Rat and Otto plan to use the Roboctopus to steal the Great Gouda. Cat Burglar arrives and cuts a deal with Lab Rat where he will help them steal the Great Gouda in exchange for Lab Rat building Cat Burglar his own robot helper. Upon being called in by a mouse named Colby Jack who is owned by Brie Fromage that the Great Gouda has been stolen, the SuperKitties spring into action. Sparks then thinks he is the only SuperKitty without superpowers, not knowing that solving problems is what actually makes him super.
33	7	"Seed Stealer"	Morgan Von Ancken	Nathan Affolter & Jessica Goossen	June 21, 2024	208	N/A
33	7	"Dastardly Dumpster"	Vera Starbard	James Roney & Max Salazar	June 21, 2024	208	N/A
Seed Stealer: Sparks informs Ginny, Buddy, and Bitsy that everyone is going to the Kittydale Garden for a Planting Party. Buddy ends up learning that fruits and vegetables grow from seeds. Before they can head out, the SuperKitties are contacted by Sam and Eddie who inform them that all the seeds for the Planting Party are gone and were taken by a gardener operating a pink wheelbarrow as Sparks even informing Eddie that there's no such thing as a hot dog plant. The SuperKitties discover that the gardener clothes are being operated by Zsa Zsa's budgies who stole the seeds so that Zsa Zsa and the budgies can eat the seeds. Dastardly Dumpster: While the SuperKitties help clean up litter near a nest inhabitanted by a family of squirrels on Earth Day, Bitsy suggests to Ginny that the SuperKitties should help clean up litter around. Meanwhile, Lab Rat uses the Otto Launcher to launch Otto to a fish stand at the Kittydale Fish Market to get fish for Otto to eat only to be thwarted by the SuperKitties. Displeased that they didn't get the fish, Lab Rat plans to get Otto his fish by inventing a flying dumpster to dump garbage to keep the SuperKitties busy. The SuperKitties are called in by Harpo and Marvin who inform them about the dumpster. They work to collect all the garbage to dispose of before they can prevent Lab Rat and Otto from stealing some fish.
34	8	"Wacky Weather"	David Grubstick	Alex Leung & Savannah Tait	July 26, 2024	209	N/A
34	8	"Kittydale Racers"	Matt Price	James Roney & Max Salazar	July 26, 2024	209	N/A
Wacky Weather: As Ginny, Sparks, Buddy, and Bitsy are watching the clouds, they see that a lot of people are making their way to the Pawsome Picnic in the park. Soon, squeaky balls come falling out of some green clouds. The SuperKitties are contacted by Sam and Eddie who inform them that squeaky balls and marshmallows are falling from the sky. They discover that Lab Rat and Otto are responsible where Lab Rat has invented the Weather Zapper where it activates the different cards on it. Though the squeaky balls and marshmallows are an accident as Lab Rat was trying to activate the card that would make it rain so that Otto can splash in the puddles. Kittydale Racers: Bitsy is partaking in the first ever Kittydale Super Duper Race alongside the other racers with her race car that Sparks helped to build. The prize is a trophy that the commentators Sam and Eddie found in the dumpster when looking for hot dogs. The racers must follow the red arrows all over town. Mr. Puppypaws is also partaking in the race. When the race begins, Mr. Puppypaws pulls out every trick to sabotage the other racers so that he can win the trophy. Bitsy informs the other SuperKitties of this. With no other choice, Bitsy abandons the race to help the other SuperKitties thwart Mr. Puppypaws and keep the Kittydale Race honorable.
35	9	"Brand New Bestie"	Kris Marvin Hughes	Nathan Affolter & Jessica Goossen	August 23, 2024	210	N/A
35	9	"Cat-o-flauge Kitty"	Nick Confalone	Alex Leung, Savannah Tait & Brian Wong	August 23, 2024	210	N/A
Brand New Bestie: Otto plays the keytar for Lab Rat as they plan to paint their favorite wall. Lab Rat finds that Otto wants to go with blue paint instead of cheese orange paint which affects their friendship enough for Otto to take his leave. Meanwhile, Ginny and Bitsy partake in their bestie day where Bitsy is weary about joining her in sardine chews as she doesn't like sardine chews. The SuperKitties are called in by Sam who states that Eddie has gone missing suddenly until he is returned to them. They discover that Lab Rat is responsible for the abduction as she tries to find someone who likes cheesy orange like him. The SuperKitties must thwart Lab Rat's plot and get her and Otto back together. Cat-o-flauge Kitty: As the SuperKitties play hide and seek in Kittydale Park, Bitsy gets startled by their chameleon friend Callie as Ginny barely saves Bitsy. Callie shows off her camouflage and joins them in hide and seek. Displeased that she can't get anyone to stand still for her group selfie, Zsa Zsa plans to make the animals stand still. Sam and Eddie contact the SuperKitties to inform them that the animals in the park are standing still until they end up frozen as well. The SuperKitties find that Zsa Zsa is using her Please Freeze Spray to make the animals stand still. In order to come up with the right plan to get Zsa Zsa's Unfreeze Spray, Ginny get inspired by Callie as Sparks creates a Cat-o-flauge that would help them get the Unfreeze Spray and set Zsa Zsa straight.
36	10	"Boat Ride Ruckus"	Michael Goldberg	Bora Moon & Alicia De Koning	August 30, 2024	212	N/A
36	10	"Favorite Fishy Cake"	Talia Rothenberg	Savannah Tait & Alicia Kok	August 30, 2024	212	N/A
Boat Ride Ruckus: Miss Poochytail invites the SuperKitties to ride on Mr. Puppypaws' boat much to the dismay of Mr. Puppypaws. Everybody is excited for it except for Sparks who hates getting wet since an incident when he was a kitten. Buddy teaches him a tactic on what to do if he gets water on him. The ride is relaxing until Zsa Zsa's budgies create a windstorm with fan-topped buoys after she thinks that she was not invited. Sparks must use the tactic he learned from Buddy to dodge the waves so that he can deactivate Zsa Zsa's fans. Favorite Fishy Cake: Bitsy feels her birthday card for Ginny, a portrait of them, is not special enough. She hears two cats talking about a fishy cake that will be sold at Chef Marci's food truck. So Bitsy heads to Chef Marci's truck to get a slice of a huge cake which she believes would make a better gift. But the cake is snatched by Lab Rat who traps Bitsy in the food truck and makes off with the fish so that she can give it to Otto for his birthday. When the other SuperKitties are called in, they help to pursue Lab Rat while Biscuit buys them time by delaying the crowd.
37	11	"Flying Piggy"	David Grubstick	James Roney & Max Salazar	September 20, 2024	213	N/A
37	11	"Get the Zoomies"	Jehan Madhani	Nathan Affolter & Jessica Goossen	September 20, 2024	213	N/A
Flying Piggy: Sparks has given Wiggles new wings as the others think he made him make tuna treats. However, Wiggles struggles to learn to fly straight away. The SuperKitties then get a call from Peanut saying that Cat Burglar stole his toy bone, telling Peanut to tell the SuperKitties to meet him on the rooftop. They meet Cat Burglar on his rooftop and they chase him but end up getting tricked into his sticky trap. Sparks calls Wiggles from his power paw and Wiggles gets encouraged to fly and free the team from the sticky trap and prevent Cat Burglar from stealing Mr. Puppypaws' golden bone. Get the Zoomies: The kitties are arrived at a new play park called the Zoomie Zone. Bitsy wants to go straight away but cuts the line by jumping over the fence. Meanwhile, Mr. Puppypaws arrives at the park and notices the line. He then decides to scare the animals in line by using Dragonbreath the Glittery. The SuperKitties soon get a call from Chibi about it as soon as they are about to eat their food. Dragonbreath the Glittery then "lays" eggs that hatch into baby dragons that start as cute but then start battling the SuperKitties. Now they must deal with the baby dragons and set Mr. Puppypaws straight.
38	12	"Super Spooky House"	Ghia Godfree	Bora Moon & Alicia De Koning	October 1, 2024	211	N/A
38	12	"Pumpkin Ball"	Sarah Mullervy	Brian Wong & Alicia Kok	October 1, 2024	211	N/A
Super Spooky House: On Halloween, Ginny, Sparks, Buddy, and Bitsy see every human and animals in their costumes. They soon come across a spooky house as Sam and Eddie claim that there is a ghost inside where they see strange shadows behind the windows. This is enough to frighten Bitsy. The SuperKitties then get a call from Sam and Eddie who inform them that Peanut chased his chew toy into the spooky house and never came out. The SuperKitties must face their fears and go into the spooky house to find Peanut. They soon find that the supposed ghost is actually a bat named Boo who is frightened by the Halloween costumes. Pumpkin Ball: Amara sets up the Pumpkin Ball that she is taking to Taylor's Halloween party at Kittydale Park. Ginny, Sparks, Buddy, Bitsy, Happy, and Yo-Yo come along for the ride in the Purr 'n Go. The Pumpkin Ball attracts the attention of Zsa Zsa, Cat Burglar, and Mr. Puppypaws. After Ginny, Sparks, Buddy, and Bitsy invite some guests, the SuperKitties get a call from Happy and Yo-Yo has been stolen. They see that Zsa Zsa dressed as a witch has taken the Pumpkin Ball for her Halloween party. Mr. Puppypaws dressed as a pirate then steals it from Zsa Zsa to be used for his Halloween party. Then Cat Burglar dressed as a showman steals it from Mr. Puppypaws for his roller-skating Halloween party. The SuperKitties must rescue the Pumpkin Ball and thwart Zsa Zsa, Mr. Puppypaws, and Cat Burglar.
39	13	"New King in Town"	Denise Downer	Michael Alcock, Alicia Kok, & Jordan Munson	October 25, 2024	214	N/A
39	13	"Tiny Trouble"	Ghia Godfree	James Roney & Max Salazar	October 25, 2024	214	N/A
New King in Town: Sparks balances on a robotic vacuum as Buddy attempts to balance on it to get the hug from Amara. Meanwhile, Mr. Puppypaws discovers that his owner has gotten a goldfish named King Fishy Fins. Feeling that he has been forgotten by his owner, Mr. Puppypaws thinks that he can't compete with King Fishy Fins and works to become a king. The SuperKitties are called in by Magda who informs that items from the museum's Royal Pet Palace Exhibit like a pet crown and scepter have been stolen. After Mr. Puppypaws claims the throne, the SuperKitties must reclaim the royal goods and set Mr. Puppypaws straight. Tiny Trouble: In the SuperKitty Cavern, Sparks is preparing to see the rooftop concert at the museum. The SuperKitties are contacted by Otto where Cat Burglar has stolen Lab Rat's Go Big or Go Small Ray. Though Lab Rat was annoyed that Otto called the SuperKitties as they head out to help. The SuperKitties arrive at the museum to find Cat Burglar shrinking the instruments needed for the rooftop concert so that he can give them to his "tiny friends" after accidentally sitting on their instruments. When Buddy tries to stop him, Cat Burglar accidentally drops the Go Big or Go Small Ray where Buddy is accidentally shrunk. Now the rest of the SuperKitties and Marcel must help Buddy realize that he doesn't need to be big to be super as they go after Cat Burglar while keeping it from being reclaimed by Lab Rat and Otto.
40	14	"Runaway Sleigh"	Jeff Poliquin	Nathan Affolter & Marlon Deane	December 4, 2024	206	N/A
40	14	"Hanukkah Rescue"	Yotam Tubul	Alex Leung & Savannah Tait	December 4, 2024	206	N/A
Runaway Sleigh: On Christmas Eve, Ginny, Sparks, Buddy, and Bitsy see the decorations in Kittydale Park. Bitsy is just sad that Christmas happens only once a day as Ginny states that they can hold Chrismtas in their hearts. Meanwhile, Blitzen appoints Comet to watch over Santa Claus' sleigh while he gets the other reindeer ready. When the sleigh is stolen by Mr. Puppypaws as part of his plan to make Christmas happen every day, Comet calls the SuperKitties for help. Now the SuperKitties must reclaim Santa's sleigh when it flies out of control and set Mr. Puppypaws straight. Hanukkah Rescue: Amara takes Ginny, Sparks, Buddy, and Bitsy to Kittydale Park to light the Kittydale Menorah as they learn about Hanukkah from Biscuits as the final light will be lit tonight. Meanwhile, Pickles accidentally breaks his family's menorah and wants to get a replacement. The SuperKitties are contacted by Biscuit who informs them that the Kittydale Menorah. When Pickles loses control of the Kittydale Menorah, they rescue Pickles and the Kittydale Menorah while learning what happened. The Kittydale Menorah is then taken by Zsa Zsa and her Budgies. Now the SuperKitties must rescue the Kittydale Menorah, fix Pickles' menorah, and persuade Zsa Zsa to return the Kittydale Menorah.
41	15	"Bossy Birdy"	Jeff Poliquin	Alex Leung, Brian Wong, & Alicia De Koning	December 13, 2024	215	N/A
41	15	"Brightest Night"	Sam Bissonnette	Bora Moon & Chris Labonte	December 13, 2024	215	N/A
Bossy Birdy: The SuperKitties have been invited by Renata to hear her children Reggie, Rosie, and Ricky prepare for the Songbird Soiree which will be happening tonight. Unfortunately, Ricky's singing voice is different from his siblings as Bitsy gives a pep talk. Meanwhile, Zsa Zsa tells her budgies that she will be partaking in the Songbird Soiress with her Aunt Lola. Secretly noting that Zsa Zsa's voice is better than hers, Aunt Lola manipulates Zsa Zsa and her budgies into getting her some things for her. The SuperKitties are contacted by Sam and Eddie and the Goldfinch family that the stuff they brought for the Songbird Soiree have been stolen. Upon catching up to Zsa Zsa, the SuperKitties must reclaim the stolen items and set Aunt Lola straight. Brightest Night: At the Purr'N'Play, Ginny practices her flips as Chibi, Phoebe, and Bibi want to see a quadruple flip the next day. That night, Ginny has a hard time sleeping. Just then, bright lights cover the city. The SuperKitties are contacted by Sam and Eddie who informs them that a bright light is waking everyone up in Kittydale. They head to Kittydale Park and discover that Lab Rat and Otto have put up the light as part of their no-sleep slumber party prior to Otto having to swim to the ocean to visit his family. This proves to be a problem for the SuperKitties as they fight their own exhaustion, and Lab Rat's fluffy pillow flingers in order to deactivate the lights. With Otto starting to get tired, Ginny must use their Cat-o-flauge to get to the light switch while the others distract Lab Rat and Otto.
42	16	"Mystery Boot Bandit"	Kris Marvin Hughes	Nathan Affolter & Jessica Goossen	January 10, 2025 (Note: This episode was first released on Disney+ on December 18, 2024.)	216	N/A
42	16	"Slippery Situation"	Charlie Bardey	Alex Leung & Brian Wong	January 10, 2025	216	N/A
Mystery Boot Bandit: Following a rainstorm, the SuperKitties are watching Buddy and Wiggles do some dancing in the Kitty Cavern until Wiggles accidentally steps on the rear of one of Bitsy's boots. Sparks works to fix on Bitsy's boots as she will not be able to run fast. Misunderstanding Buddy claiming that Bitsy would've had more boots, Wiggles flies off with some boots to try to replace Bitsy's broken boot. The SuperKitties get a call from Captain FluffNStuff who informs them that her boots have been stolen delaying Sparks' plans to fix Bitsy's boots. Soon, the boots of Miss Poochytail, Earington, and Whiskers get stolen, even Cat Burglar's rollerskating boot. When they find that Wiggles is responsible, the SuperKitties must get Bitsy's boot fixed, set Wiggles straight, and return the boots to everyone. Slippery Situation: In the Kitty Cavern, the SuperKitties are doing their activities. Ginny paints a picture of Sparks and Buddy until Bitsy cools down the Kitty Cavern with cold air as she learns that Ginny, Sparks, and Buddy are not used to being in the cold causing Sparks to have Wiggles activate his pig mode. Meanwhile, Lab Rat and Otto are out for a walk when they slip on the butter that came out of Sam and Eddie's dropped popcorn bag. Finding that this is fun, Lab Rat gets a plan to slide everywhere. The SuperKitties get a call from Sam stating that animals are slipping and sliding all over the park enough that Eddie can't catch his hot dog. They discover that Lab Rat has invented the Butter Blaster to make the city have slippery fun. Now the SuperKitties must stop the Butter Blaster from covering Kittydale in butter from the Kittydale Tower and set Lab Rat and Otto straight.
43	17	"Quests for Nests"	Kamon Naddaf	Michael Alcock & Jordan Munson	February 7, 2025	217	N/A
43	17	"Pretend Piano Player"	Alyson Piekarsky	Alicia De Koning & Chris Labonte	February 7, 2025	217	N/A
Quests for Nests: If there is one thing that Bitsy can't do recently, it's mastering tying a knot. Meanwhile, Zsa Zsa leads a heist on all the nests in Kittydale in light of her budgie George having his cousins come visit as Zsa Zsa doesn't know how to make a nest. Pretend Piano Player: Poochissimo is going to be performing in the park as Bitsy masters playing the floor piano. Meanwhile, Mr. Puppypaws has composed a birthday song for Quacksley and is not good at playing the piano. To remedy this, Mr. Puppypaws drags King Fishy Fins in his plot to have Poochissimo and her piano flown to his rooftop and trick her into performing behind the curtain to make it look like that he is playing the piano.
44	18	"The Never-Ending Rainbow"	David Grubstick	Nathan Affolter & Jessica Goossen	March 7, 2025	221	N/A
44	18	"Lost Leashes"	Robin Stein	Alex Leung & Brian Wong	March 7, 2025	221	N/A
The Never-Ending Rainbow: The kitties are at the beach when Buddy makes a sandcastle with shells as windows. Unfortunately, the castle gets wrecked in the rain as Buddy gets taught that there will be lots of special things later. Meanwhile after the rain stops, Zsa-Zsa sees a rainbow up in the sky, but then it fades away. So she spreads colorful clouds acoss the sky to make a never ending rainbow. Sam and Eddie let them know that the clouds are covering up almost all of Kittydale. Now it's up to the SuperKitties to turn of the cloud making machine and set Zsa-Zsa straight. Lost Leashes: The SuperKitties are practicing Yarn-Blasting skills. Unfortunately, Sparks keeps getting distracted by his new game he made called the Kitty Catch. He gets so distracted that it causes Mr. Puppypaws to escape with leashes he stole after he doesn't want to go on a walk now that he has a new toy he doesn't want to stop playing with.
45	19	"Easter Buddy"	Yotam Tubul	Nathan Affolter & Jessica Goossen	March 28, 2025	223	N/A
45	19	"Egg-Celent Adventure"	Jeff Poliquin	James Roney & Max Salazar	March 28, 2025	223	N/A
Easter Buddy: Tomorrow is Easter as Amara is wrapping up the time with the Purr 'n Go. Buddy is dressed up as the Easter Bunny to help the Bunny Brigade out with the Bunny Bonanza as it is claimed that the Easter Bunny's magic basket is never empty. Overhearing this, the budgies inform Zsa Zsa as they suspect that the real Easter Bunny might be among the rabbits and plan to steal all the baskets so that they can find the Easter Bunny's basket and get a supply of seeds. Unable to get the Easter Bunny suit off, Buddy informs the rest of the SuperKitties of what happened. Now the SuperKitties must work to reclaim the baskets and set Zsa Zsa straight. Egg-Celent Adventure: As children are on an Easter egg hunt in Kittydale Park, Buddy and Bitsy are wanting to find Easter eggs of their own as they find Sam and Eddie keeping Mama Goldfinch's eggs safe while she's away. Meanwhile, Lab Rat and Otto partake in the Easter egg hunt to get to the fruity treats inside and are being outdone by the other animal causing Lab Rat to come up with an idea. The SuperKitties get a call from the other animals who inform them that their Easter eggs have been stolen. In addition, an exercise routine causes Sam and Eddie to lose Mama Goldfinch's eggs. The SuperKitties discover that Lab Rat and Otto are responsible for the Easter egg theft as Mama Goldfinch's eggs also end up in Lab Rat's baskets. The SuperKitties must do an egg-cellent job to rescue the Easter eggs, set Lab Rat and Otto straight, and help Sam and Eddie get Mama Goldfinch's eggs back to her nest.
46	20	"Cheese-cano"	Jehan Madhani	Nathan Affolter & Jessica Goossen	April 25, 2025 (Note: This episode was first released on Disney+ on April 16, 2025.)	219	N/A
46	20	"Super Silly Videos"	Michael Goldberg	James Roney & Max Salazar	April 25, 2025	219	N/A
Cheese-cano: At an invention show and tell in Kittydale Park, Sparks shows off his Kitty Slide invention. It gets upstaged by Zelda's catapult invention. Ginny, Buddy, and Bitsy tell Sparks that there can be room for more than one inventor in Kittydale. Jealous of Zelda's success, Lab Rat comes up with an idea to make a better invention. The SuperKitties are called in by Sam and Eddie to investigate the rumbling in the park. They find that Lab Rat in her Roboctopus and Otto have created a mobile Cheese-cano which will erupt cheese all over Kittydale. Now the SuperKitties enlist Zelda and they must help Sparks to block the hole and set Lab Rat straight. Super Silly Videos: Chef Marci is holding a funny pet contest where the winner will have a treat named after them. Amara films a video of Buddy doing silly stuff. Afterwards, Buddy is told by Ginny, Sparks, and Bitsy that Amara would like him regardless on the outcome of the contest. The SuperKitties are then called in by different pets who mention that their owners' phones that contain their entry for the contest have been stolen. They discover that the budgies are behind the theft as Zsa Zsa plans to have her video be the only one in the contest. With a plan to keep the budgies distracted with humor, the SuperKitties must work to reclaim the phones and set Zsa Zsa straight.
47	21	"Colossal Quacksley"	Ann Austen	Alicia De Koning & Brooke Hendrick	May 16, 2025	218	N/A
47	21	"Great Pizza Chase"	Morgan Von Ancken	Alex Leung & Brian Wong	May 16, 2025	218	N/A
Colossal Quacksley: Lab Rat steals Mr. Puppypaws's Sr. Quacksley and turns him into a giant floatie for Otto to play on, which nearly ruins the Kittydale Summer Party. Great Pizza Chase: The SuperKitties have to save Pizza Night after Cat Burglar steals all of the pizza pies for his new friend: a raccoon named Coco.
48	22	"Purr N Go Rescue"	Maxwell Beaudry	Michael Alcock, Emma Hoffard, & Jordan Munson	June 20, 2025	220	N/A
48	22	"Peanut Butter Problem"	Ghia Godfree	James Roney & Max Salazar	June 20, 2025	220	N/A
Purr N Go Rescue: The SuperKitties switch powers with each other before Lat Rat and Otto steal the Purr n' Go to try to fly it to the moon. Peanut Butter Problem: Ginny and Mr. Puppypaws get stuck in the peanut butter factory after the latter tries to steal some of Peanut the dalmatian's birthday rainbow peanut butter.
49	23	"Robo-Friends"	Sam Bissonnette	Emma Hoffard, Jordan Munson, & Morgan Shandro	July 11, 2025	222	N/A
49	23	"Wacky Wiggles"	Kris Marvin Hughes	Alicia De Koning & Brooke Hendrick	July 11, 2025	222	N/A
Robo-Friends: Right after Lab Rat tries to steal ketchup crunchies, Wiggles and Roboctopus learn how to make a friend. Wacky Wiggles: When a Wiggles update goes wrong, Bitsy and Buddy learn to listen to instructions so they can save Wiggles from Cat Burglar and Granny Catarina after he helps them steal a heart gem from the Kittydale museum, right before the Friendship Fest.
50	24	"Critter Tower Takedown"	David Grubstick	Alex Leung & Brian Wong	August 1, 2025	224	N/A
50	24	"Kickin' Kitty"	Ghia Godfree	Alicia De Koning & Brooke Hendrick	August 1, 2025	224	N/A
Critter Tower Takedown: When Cat Burglar steals the Critter Tower and turns it into a pirate ship for Coco the Raccoon, the SuperKitties and their new wildcat friend Willa have to save it, so everyone can play. Kickin' Kitty: Lab Rat and Otto steal the museum's Moon model by kicking it with their pair of giant boots, leaving the SuperKitties and Willa to go after it.

=== Season 3: Su-Purr Wild (2025–26) ===
No. overall	No. in season	Title	Written by	Storyboarded by	Original release date	Prod. code	U.S. viewers (millions)
51	1	"Mega Mouse"	Yotam Tubul	Renee Howerton, Alex Leung, & Roger Liu	September 22, 2025	301	N/A
51	1	"Wild Jungle"	Michael Goldberg	Morgan Shandro & Brian Wong	September 22, 2025	301	N/A
Mega Mouse: Willa visits Ginny, Sparks, Buddy, and Bitsy in Purr'N'Play where they have a brief game of chasing a rainbow mouse toy. This gets witnessed by Lab Rat and Otto. Displeased that cats chase mice, Lab Rat comes up with a plan involving both the rainbow mouse toy and the Go-Big-or-Go-Small Ray. As Willa unknowingly finds out that her friends are the SuperKitties when they are called in about cats being chased, she helps them out when they find Lab Rat and Otto using the enlarged rainbow mouse toy to chase the cats. The SuperKitties and Willa must work to corral the giant-sized rainbow mouse toy and defeat Lab Rat and Otto. Wild Jungle: The SuperKitties are called in to the Wild Jungle outside of Kittydale by Willa to help save a lizard who had climbed too high. This enables them to test out their new wildcat-themed suits. Afterwards, the SuperKitties explore Willa's local home and set up a satellite base in the Kitty Cat Mountain complete with a rock wall for the lizard and other young animals to climb up of. Meanwhile, Zsa Zsa and her budgies have arrived in the Wild Jungle and plan to turn it into her own resort. To deal with the other locals, Zsa Zsa uses her special nail polish on her budgies to give them the strength to lift rocks. When Zsa Zsa puts her plan into motion, the SuperKitties and Willa must work to dodge the budgies, get their hands on the nail polish remover, and set Zsa Zsa straight.
52	2	"Tooth Fairy"	Ghia Godfree	Alicia De Koning & Brooke Hendrick	September 23, 2025	302	N/A
52	2	"Muffin Mess"	Maxwell Beaudry	Roger Liu & David Wiebe	September 23, 2025	302	N/A
Tooth Fairy: Zsa Zsa pretends to be the Tooth Fairy to steal Bitsy's tooth because she was sad Bitsy was gonna get a present and she wasn't. The SuperKitties must get Bitsy's tooth back and set Zsa Zsa straight. Muffin Mess: Otto wants to get rid of Lab Rat's Strawberry and Clam Muffins, but accidentally ends up making more after spilling a multiplication serum. The SuperKitties must stop Otto from making more Muffins.
53	3	"Super Sleepover"	Robyn Brown	Nathan Affolter & Lori Allen	September 24, 2025	303	N/A
53	3	"Unicorn Catchers"	Yotam Tubul	Georgios Chatzellis & Marta Demong	September 24, 2025	303	N/A
Super Sleepover: Willa is staying with Ginny, Sparks, Buddy, and Bitsy at the Purr'N'Play as they have a slumber party. As the kitties settle in for the night, Willa has a hard time sleeping due to it being different from the Wild Jungle. The SuperKitties are contacted by Peanut and Whiskers who inform them that their pet beds are gone and that they can't fall asleep. The SuperKitties and Willa spot Zsa Zsa's budgies stealing the pet beds. They follow them to Zsa Zsa who had the pet beds stolen because she is not comfortable while sleeping over at Aunt Lola's lair. The SuperKitties must find a way to reclaim the pet beds and find a way to get Zsa Zsa and Willa feeling more comfortable to sleep. Unicorn Catchers: In the Wild Jungle, the SuperKitties and Willa are playing around as Bitsy is trying to build Mr. Greenie a house when they are in the Wild Jungle. Ginny gives her the advice to asks the other kitties for help building Mr. Greenie's house. The SuperKitties are contacted by Stella who states that her mangoes are covered in gluey glitter. They help to remove the glue and free the other mangoes. Afterwards, the SuperKitties and Willa discover that the new villains Pamster and Champster Glamster are responsible for the traps as they are trying to catch a unicorn for their owner Evie after accidentally spilling paint and juice on Evie's plush unicorn. The SuperKitties and Willa must work to remove the traps and help get the plush unicorn cleaned up.
54	4	"Vanishing Veggies"	Elise Allen	Nathan Affolter & Marta Demong	September 25, 2025	304	N/A
54	4	"Octo-Gummies"	Kris Marvin Hughes	Renee Howerton & Morgan Shandro	September 25, 2025	304	N/A
Vanishing Veggies: The Glamsters steal the veggies of kittydale because her human Evie doesn't like vegetables. So the SuperKitties must get the veggies back from The Glamsters and set them straight. Octo-Gummies: Lab Rat misses Otto since he went to visit his own family, so Lab Rat makes gummies that look like Otto so she can feel happy again. The SuperKitties must stop Lab Rat, set her straight and convince her Otto will come back soon.
55	5	"Pinktastrophe"	David Grubstick	Alicia De Koning & Brooke Hendrick	September 26, 2025	305	N/A
55	5	"Battle of the Baddies"	Nick Lopez & Robyn Brown	Roger Liu & David Wiebe	September 26, 2025	305	N/A
Pinktastrophe: The SuperKitties are coloring pictures in the SuperKitty Cavern. Though Bitsy has all the green crayons because she is doing a lot of pictures of Mr. Greenie. Before Ginny can talk to Bitsy about it, the SuperKitties are called in by the local animals when various pink items go missing. They find the pink items flying in the sky and trace it to Zsa Zsa's lair who has used a special powder to attract anything pink. When Zsa Zsa accidentally gets covered in the powder, the pink items get attracted to her including Ginny's super-suit. The rest of the SuperKitties must work to protect Ginny and Zsa Zsa from the pink items and get their hands on the antidote while setting Zsa Zsa straight. Battle of the Baddies: When Buddy gets depressed that Wiggles has done a better tower made from tuna cans, Sparks tells him that everybody can be better at everything. Meanwhile in Kittydale Park, Mr. Puppypaws runs into Cat Burglar and they end up in a contest to see who is a better baddie. The SuperKitties are called in by Magda and arrive in the museum where they find Mr. Puppypaws tied up and Cat Burglar making off with a crown. When Mr. Puppypaws is cut down, he challenges Cat Burglar to reach the top of Kittydale Tower which Mr. Puppypaws wins. The final showdown is at the fish cart near the pier as the SuperKitties work to put an end to this contest before things get worse.
56	6	"Franken-Rat"	Jeffrey King	Lori Allen & Georgios Chatzellis	September 30, 2025	306	N/A
56	6	"Pumpkin Parade"	Dana Starfield	Alex Leung & Brian Wong	September 30, 2025	306	N/A
Franken-Rat: On Halloween, Ginny, Sparks, Buddy, and Bitsy observe every human and animal celebrating Hallowing their way. Displeased that nobody is offering cheese when out trick or treating, Lab Rat comes up with a robot version of herself called Franken-Rat to turn the Halloween treats in Kittydale into cheese so that she can do some trick or cheesing as they are too much for her Cheese Blaster. The SuperKitties are contacted by Peanut that someone had swapped Nadia's treats with cheese. When Franken-Rat gets exposed to a fire hydrant and goes berserk, It's up to the SuperKitties to thwart Franken-Rat, restore all the cheesified items, and show Lab Rat how to trick or treat the right way. Pumpkin Parade: On Halloween, Amara is setting up the Purr'N'Play as part of the Pumpkin Pal Parade as she enter's Ginny's witch costume into the costume contest where the winner will win the Pumpkin of the Year award. Due to Pickles being in a pumpkin costume, Ginny worries that Amara's witch costume for her won't win. The SuperKitties are called in by Boomer, Roger, and Pickles who states that their costumes are gone. In addition, Ginny's witch costume is also stolen. The SuperKitties follow the trail of the sparkles from Ginny's costume and other costume parts where they end up discovering that Mr. Puppypaws is responsible where he wants Quacksley to win the costume contest. The SuperKitties must retrieve the costumes and set Mr. Puppypaws straight.
57	7	"Diamond Duckie"	Elise Allen	Brooke Hendrick, David Wiebe, & Alicia De Koning	November 7, 2025	307	N/A
57	7	"Mystery Monster"	Ghia Godfree	Roger Liu, Selena Marchetti, & Candice Prince	November 7, 2025	307	N/A
Diamond Duckie: Willa joins the SuperKitties as they go on a trip to the Kittydale Museum where Willa learns how to look at an artifact while not touching it. When Mr. Puppypaws, who is visiting the museum, hears about a duck-shaped diamond in Willa's jungle, he heads to an echoey crystal cave to take it. The SuperKitties are called in by a family of bats who live in the cave when one of them, Bella, informs them where the Diamond Duckie is. Because the Diamond Duckie is part of the cave, removing it will cause the cave to collapse. The SuperKitties and Willa must work to save the cave and set Mr. Puppypaws straight. Mystery Monster: Zsa Zsa is afraid of some unknown creature in the Kittydale Jungle because of its frightening sounds and moves in with Willa at her treehouse. The SuperKitties are called in by Willa where they help find the unknown creature that is leaving Zsa Zsa frightened. This leads to a search throughout the Kittydale Jungle to find the creature that Zsa Zsa is afraid of. Even when they track down its sound, the SuperKitties find that the creature that is frightening Zsa Zsa with its sounds is something they'd least suspect, turning out to be a frog named Lollihop.
58	8	"Jungle Rose"	Rick Suvalle	Lori Allen & Georgios Chatzellis	November 14, 2025	308	N/A
58	8	"Super Special Stone"	Annabeth Bondor-Stone & Connor White	Alex Leung & Topher Parnell	November 14, 2025	308	N/A
Jungle Rose: Willa invites the SuperKitties over to the Wild Jungle to check out a special jungle rose with purple petals that only blooms at night. Willa is so excited to see the rose bloom that she has a hard time waiting, so the SuperKitties decide to help her wait by playing a game of Patty-Paws with her. Meanwhile, Lab Rat wants Otto to watch the rose, too, so she uses her Weather Zapper to make the rose bloom sooner, causing trouble for most of the jungle animals. Now the Superkitties must clear the dark clouds and set Lab Rat straight. Super Special Stone: When Cat Burglar takes what looks like a colored rock for a souvenir as a remembrance for his visit to the jungle with his grandmother, a large bird goes hysterical in the place.
59	9	"Kittydale Christmas Tree"	Yotam Tubul	Nathan Affolter & Marta Demong	December 4, 2025	309	N/A
59	9	"Skating Buddies"	Annabeth Bondor-Stone	Renee Howerton & Morgan Shandro	December 4, 2025	309	N/A
Kittydale Christmas Tree: Willa celebrates her first Christmas in Kittydale. She will also experience Kittydale's Christmas lighting event. Unfortunately, The Glamsters steal the Kittydale Christmas tree so that Evie can have the best Christmas. So the SuperKitties and Willa must get the Christmas tree back from The Glamsters and set them straight. Skating Buddies: The pets of kittydale are having a skating buddies contest. With Willa visiting and being Ginny's skating buddy, Bitsy must muster up the courage to find a new skating buddy. This gets delayed because Cat Burglar steals the medals since Cousin Sassy is unable to participate. So the SuperKitties and Willa must get the medals back from Cat Burglar, save the skating buddies contest, and set Cat Burglar straight.
60	10	"The Glamping Glamsters"	Lizzie Prestel	Nathan Affolter & Marta Demong	December 12, 2025	310	N/A
60	10	"Trouble in the Jungle"	Kris Marvin Hughes	Renee Howerton, Selena Marchetti, & Morgan Shandro	December 12, 2025	310	N/A
The Glamping Glamsters: Buddy feels nervous about spending the night in Willa's treehouse since the other Superkittes are going out. Meanwhile, The Glamsters are also spending the night in the Wild Jungle but Champster Glamster doesn't want to spend the night away from home because he doesn't think he is ready. Trouble in the Jungle: Mr. Puppypaws puppysits Peanut, but he is making a mess of his rooftop which ends up causing Mr. Puppypaws to go to the Wild Jungle. Though he ends up making a mess of the Jungle. The SuperKitties and Willa must work to clean up the mess, set Mr. Puppypaws straight, and help him set Peanut straight.
61	11	"Tricky Treat Trickster"	Sarah Mullervy	Lori Allen & Georgios Chatzellis	January 9, 2026	311	N/A
61	11	"Jungle Junk Pile"	Ghia Godfree	Alex Leung & Topher Parnell	January 9, 2026	311	N/A
Tricky Treat Trickster: Wiggles hears the SuperKitties wish they could have a different treat instead of the Tuna Treats which Buddy likes. He heads out to find new food for the SuperKitties and stumbles upon Lab Rat and Otto trying to get into the Treat Truck. He helps them out as Lab Rat manipulates him into helping them steal food. The SuperKitties are called in by Magda and Peanut about the missing food. Now they must work to reclaim the food, defeat Lab Rat and Otto, and set Wiggles straight. Jungle Junk Pile: When the SuperKitties plan to visit Willa in the Wild Jungle, Bitsy barely finds Mr. Greenie in a messy pile which her teammates help find. Meanwhile, Cat Burglar and Cousin Sassy are scolded by Granny Catarina for making a mess in their warehouse lair. So Cat Burglar and Cousin Sassy relocate to the Wild Jungle to set up a new lair where they end up making a mess while swiping the other animals items. The SuperKitties and Willa must reclaim the items and work to defeat Cat Burglar and Cousin Sassy even when Granny Catarina catches up to them.
62	12	"Clamshell Coaster"	Jehan Madhani	Brooke Hendrick & Roger Liu	January 16, 2026	312	N/A
62	12	"Zsa-Zsa Spa Spa"	Ghia Godfree	Rodrigo Villareal & David Wiebe	January 16, 2026	312	N/A
Clamshell Coaster: Sparks is feeling tired after playing a game with Ginny, Buddy & Bitsy so he decides to rest. Meanwhile, Lab Rat and Otto are spending the day with Otto's Family, but Lab Rat is feeling tired but she wouldn't wanna spoil Otto's day so she steals the Clamshell Coaster so Otto and his family can have fun while she rests. But things don't go to plan as the coaster goes out of control, The SuperKitties must stop the coaster, save Otto and his family, and set Lab Rat straight. Zsa-Zsa Spa Spa: The SuperKitties and Willa spend the day at the Wild Jungle's Waterfall. But the fun gets disturbed when Zsa Zsa blocks the waterfall to make a spa for the budgies leaving all the animals without the water for fun and drinking. The SuperKitties must stop Zsa Zsa and set her straight.
63	13	"Bubble Bathin' Burbles"	Yotam Tubul	Nathan Affolter & Marta Demong	January 30, 2026	313	N/A
63	13	"Favorite - Favorites"	John N. Huss	Renee Howerton & Morgan Shandro	January 30, 2026	313	N/A
Bubble Bathin' Burbles: Lab Rat commands her Burbles to steal bubble bottles around Kittydale so Otto could have a bubble bath. The Superkitties must stop the Burbles and set Lab Rat straight. Favorite - Favorites: Cat Burglar steals stuffy toys around Kittydale so Coco would have a favorite favorite and she would give Cat Burglar back Little Rainbow which is his favorite favorite. One of the stuffy's stolen is Willa's favorite favorite stuffed koala named Woolly. The Superkitties and Willa must get the stuffy's back and help Coco have a favorite favorite.
64	14	"Fishy Fish Thief"	Sarah Mullervy	Brooke Hendrick & Roger Liu	February 27, 2026	314	N/A
64	14	"Burgled Backpacks"	Ghia Godfree	Rodrigo Villareal & David Wiebe	February 27, 2026	314	N/A
Fishy Fish Thief: Mr. Puppypaws steals the fishy statue from the new Wild Wonders exhibit at the Kittydale Museum so King Fishy Fins wouldn't be lonely. The Superkitties and Willa needs to get the fishy statue, set Mr. Puppypaws straight and help find a way King Fishy Fins won't be lonely. Burgled Backpacks: The Glamsters steal all the backpacks because they don't want Evie or any other kid to go to school because their gonna miss them. The Superkitties must get the backpacks back from The Glamsters and set them straight.
65	15	"Copter Caper"	Lizzie Prestel	Lori Allen, Georgios Chatzellis, & Brooke Hendrick	March 6, 2026	315	N/A
65	15	"Sneaky Statue"	Yotam Tubul	Alex Leung & Topher Parnell	March 6, 2026	315	N/A
Copter Caper: The SuperKitties arrive in the Wild Jungle on their Goldish Glider which Sparks modified to also enable Willa to ride on it. She struggles to get on until the SuperKitties help her out. Meanwhile, Granny Catarina takes Cat Burglar, Cousin Sassy, and Coco on a trip to the Wild Jungle where she claims that she knows about it much to the dismay of Cat Burglar and Cousin Sassy. When Granny Catarina and Coco get stuck up a high tree, Cat Burglar and Cousin Sassy steal stuff to make something to help them get down. This ends up attracting the SuperKitties and Willa. When Cat Burglar and Cousin Sassy confiscate the Kitty Copter, the SuperKitties and Willa must use the Goldfish Glider to catch up to them and then rescue Granny Catarina and Coco. Sneaky Statue: Amara is preparing for a party as she has Buddy guard her tiara. Buddy plans to not lose it unlike last time. Meanwhile, Granny Catarina is celebrating her birthday as she reminisces about the stuff she burgled. As Granny Catarina has been unable to take the tiara from the Purr'N'Play, Cat Burglar and Cousin Sassy plan to do job for her. Arriving outside the Purr'N'Play, they see a large golden Maneki-neko be delivered to the pet shop across the street which gives them an idea. When the SuperKitties are contacted by Sigmund about the stolen Maneki-neko, they find Amara's tiara on top of it as Cat Burglar and Cousin Sassy pilot it to Cat Burglar's lair. Now the SuperKitties must pull a Trojan Horse trick to get in so that they can reclaim the tiara and the Maneki-neko and provide a better birthday present for Granny Catarina.
66	16	"Purdy Birdy Picnic"	Melinda LaRose	Nathan Affolter, Marta Demong, & Brooke Hendrick	March 27, 2026	316	N/A
66	16	"Swimmy Zone"	Ghia Godfree & Robyn Brown	Renee Howerton, Alex Leung, & Topher Parnell	March 27, 2026	316	N/A
Purdy Birdy Picnic: Zsa-Zsa wants her picnic with her Aunt Lola to be just the two of them, but Aunt Lola offers treats to other animals. Swimmy Zone: Mr. Puppypaws turns the Zoomie Zone into a giant fishbowl.
67	17	"Super Glamsters"	Ghia Godfree	Brooke Hendrick & Roger Liu	April 3, 2026	317	N/A
67	17	"Astro-Hamsters"	Lizzie Prestel	Chelsea Woolman & David Wiebe	April 3, 2026	317	N/A
Super Glamsters: Out of fear that Evie loves a fictional superhero more than them, the Glamsters decide to become superheroes, and their "heroic deeds" (which are just spreading stickers around) end up causing even bigger problems for the other animals in need (they even don't care to stop Mr Puppypaws and Lab Rat when they run into their evil schemes at one point). Astro-Hamsters: When Evie gets sick, the Glamsters use a new space shuttle to tow the museum's space exhibit to her place. Meanwhile, Ginny needs to stay behind because she's sick too, so Sparks, Buddy, and Bitsy need to confront them without her.
68	18	"Snow Bird"	Maxwell Beaudry	Lori Allen & Shiyeon Cho	May 8, 2026	318	N/A
68	18	"Rock Out Ray"	Yotam Tubul	Alex Leung & Topher Parnell	May 8, 2026	318	N/A
Snow Bird: While it snows in Kittydale, Aunt Lola decides to spend the winter in the jungle, but Zsa-Zsa opposes her departure, and tries to keep her in town through schemes. Rock Out Ray: Because Otto's rock show is not getting any fans, Lab Rat uses a ray to make animals in the vicinity dance against their will.
69	19	"Fin-tastic Getaway"	Kris Marvin Hughes	Renee Howerton & Roger Liu	May 22, 2026	319	N/A
69	19	"Boo Boo Bandit"	Maxwell Beaudry	Morgan Shandro & Chelsea Woolman	May 22, 2026	319	N/A
Fin-tastic Getaway: When Mr. Puppypaws takes King Fishy Fins on an outing but only focuses on his interests, the fish secretly takes control and drives the stroller across town without him. Boo Boo Bandit: Pamster and Champster have their high-tech hamster ball taken from them by Zsa-Zsa who uses it to ensure her budgie friend George never gets hurt again after a sky swimming incident.
70	20	"Elephantastic Elephant"	Rick Suvalle	Nathan Affolter & Marta Demong	June 12, 2026	320	N/A
70	20	"Glam-tastrophe"	Yotam Tubul	Brooke Hendrick & David Wiebe	June 12, 2026	320	N/A
Elephantastic Elephant: Evie wishes that she could have a baby elephant as her pet, so Pamster and Champster take one named Elvis away from the Wild Jungle to Evie's house in Kittydale by luring him with a banana, and this leads to them making an elephant-sized mess in Kittydale. When they get to Evie's house, Elvis also makes a mess of Evie's room, and the Glamsters' confetti cloud meant to "distract" Elvis scares him, so he busts out of the building, and the loud, busy city makes him feel so overwhelmed that he runs loose through the city. Now, the SuperKitties and Wiggles have to calm Elvis down, return him to the Wild Jungle, clean up the mess and set the Glamsters straight. Glam-tastrophe: The Glamsters make friends with Ms. Poochytail which makes Puppypaws jealous, so he steals a bunch of "glam" stuff to out-glam them, and even renames himself as Mr. Glammypaws. Now it's up to SuperKitties and Willa to stop Mr. Glammypaws from getting too glam, set him straight, return him to normal, and return all the glam stuff.
71	21	"The New SuperKitty!"	Sarah Mullervy	Lori Allen, Renee Howerton, Alex Leung, Roger Liu, Topher Parnell, Morgan Shandro, & Chelsea Woolman	August 6, 2026	322	N/A
Willa officially joins the team and becomes the fifth SuperKitty. But when Cat Burglar joins forces with the Glamsters, Willa's newfound skills and her confidence in herself will ultimately be put to the test.
72	22	"Bistro Bungle"	Laura Sreebny	Lori Allen & Melissa Allen	August 13, 2026 (Note: This episode was first released on Disney+ on August 7, 2026.)	324	N/A
72	22	"Zoomie Ball"	Robyn Brown & Ghia Godfree	Alex Leung & Topher Parnell	August 13, 2026	324	N/A
Bistro Bungle: Willa accidentally breaks the Superkitty copter after trying to kick a crinkle ball and is worried about telling the others. At the same time, Cat Burglar eats a whole cake, unaware it was for Coco's birthday, so he steals Colby Jack's tira-mouse-u cake from his new bistro for pets. Zoomie Ball: Champster Glamster has the zoomies because he is excited for a Singing Squirrels concert, but he accidentally makes a huge mess around all the other participating animals. Now, the Superkitties must stop Champster before the concert is ruined.
73	23	"Howl-o-Ween Charm"	Annabeth Bondor-Stone & Connor White	Nathan Affolter, Marta Demong, Renee Howerton, & Morgan Shandro	September 28, 2026	326	N/A
Zsa Zsa gets her hands on the Howloween cat's collar ornament, and a scuffle between her and the Superkitties results in rambunctious creatures called the Trixters emerging from the jewel. The Superkitties and the Howloween cat must stop the Trixters and their tricky behaviour and save Howloween.
74	24	"Friendsgiving Feast"	Yotam Tubul	Lori Allen, Shiyeon Cho, Alex Leung, & Topher Parnell	November 5, 2026	321	TBD
When Pamster and Champster Glamster find out Evie can’t head over to her Glammy's for Thanksgiving, they steal everything Thanksgiving-related around Kittydale so she won’t need to make a new tradition. The SuperKitties and Willa, with help from Eddie's uncle Tony, must stop the Glamsters, save Friendsgiving and set them straight.
75	25	"Grand Pigeon Poobah"	Ghia Godfree	Nathan Affolter & Marta Demong	November 13, 2026 (Note: This episode was first released on Disney+ on November 6, 2026.)	323	TBD
75	25	"Puppy Pirate"	Ghia Godfree	Brooke Hendrick & David Wiebe	November 13, 2026	323	TBD
Grand Pigeon Poobah: Uncle Tony returns to Kittydale, and mentions about a club he runs called The Pigeon Lounge Club which Zsa-Zsa overhears. But the only way to become a member of the club is by doing a special wingshake but Zsa-Zsa thinks she can’t do the wingshake, so the Budgies steal Uncle Tony’s hat as well as other hats he’s got in his bag. The SuperKitties and Uncle Tony must get the hats back, set Zsa-Zsa straight and help her learn the special wingshake. Puppy Pirate: It’s Pirate Day at Kittydale pier where all the animals must find treasure to share, but Bitsy eats a second treat after already having one, which leaves Mr. Puppypaws feeling sad so he steals all the treasure chests around the city. The SuperKitties must stop Mr. Puppypaws and set him straight.

== Shorts ==
=== Superkitties: Su-Purr Adventures ===
In addition to the main series, a number of shorts, titled Superkitties: Su-Purr Adventures, was released beginning in August 2024.

==== Season 1 ====
No.	Title	Original release date
1	"Dress Like a SuperKitty"	August 7, 2024
2	"Oopsie Kitty"	August 7, 2024
3	"Bitsy’s Tube Trouble"	August 7, 2024
4	"Buddy the Babysitter"	August 7, 2024
5	"Ginny’s Pawsome Party"	August 7, 2024
6	"Sparks Stroller Surfing"	August 7, 2024
7	"Let’s Purr ’N’ Go!"	August 7, 2024
8	"Playing SuperKitties"	August 7, 2024
9	"Quacksey’s Playdate"	August 7, 2024
10	"Catch the Kite"	August 7, 2024

==== Season 2 ====
No.	Title	Original release date
1	"The SuperKitties’ Wild Scavenger Hunt"	August 4, 2025
2	"Let’s Go Su-Purr Wild!"	August 4, 2025
3	"Willa’s Wild Treehouse"	August 4, 2025
4	"Su-Purr Wild Copter Rescue"	August 4, 2025
5	"Ginny’s Su-Purr Wild Chase"	August 4, 2025
6	"Bitsy’s Wild Sleepover"	August 4, 2025
7	"Sparks Pink-tastic Pursuit"	August 4, 2025
8	"Buddy’s Balloon Adventure"	August 4, 2025
9	"Wildcat Cavern Catch"	August 4, 2025
10	"The Jungle Jam"	August 4, 2025
