= Utkarsh Ambudkar =

American actor and rapper (born 1983)

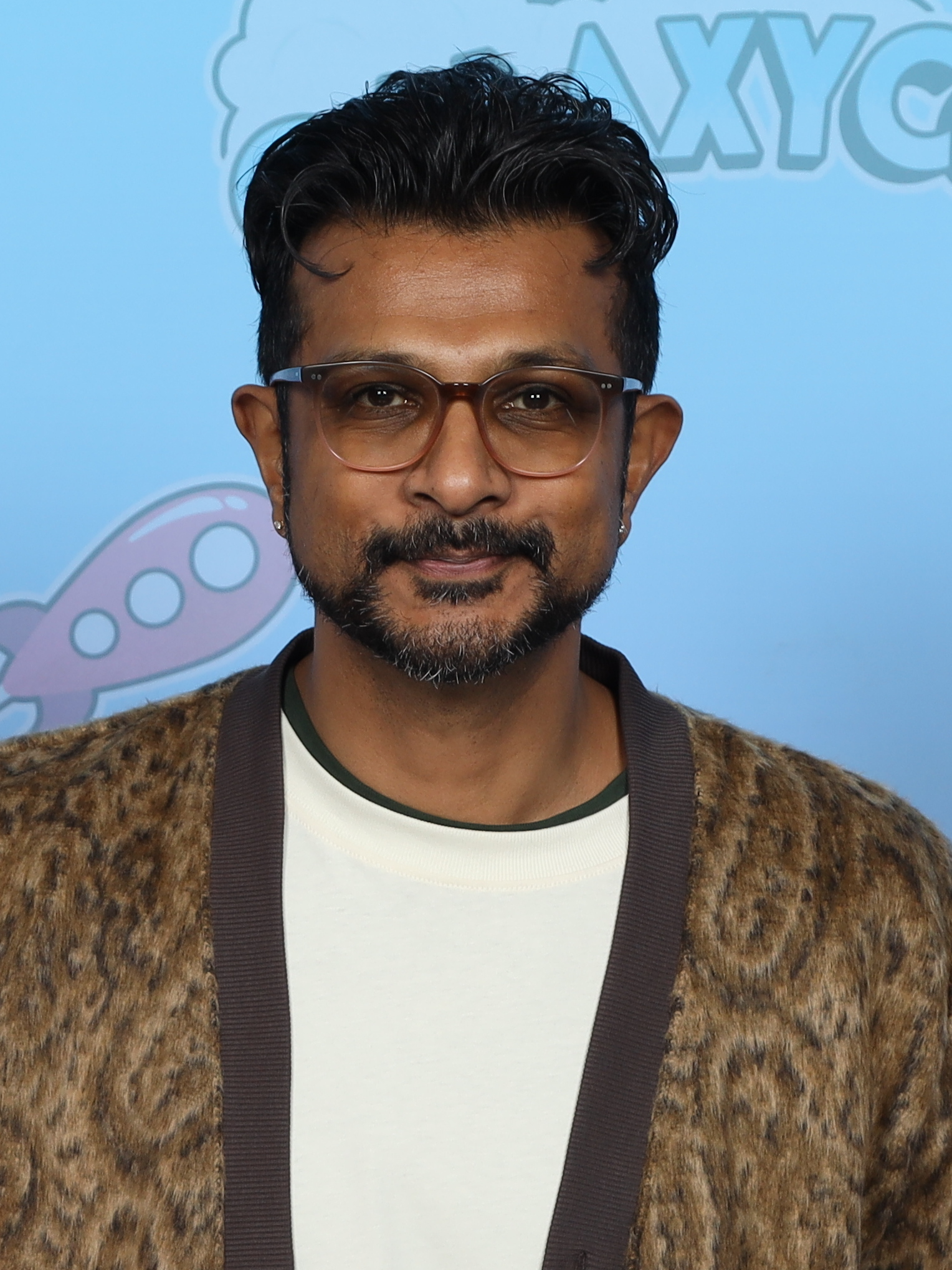
- Ambudkar at the 2025 GalaxyCon Columbus
- Born: December 8, 1983 (age 42); Baltimore, Maryland, U.S.
- Other names: UTK the INC; UTK
- Education: New York University (BFA)
- Occupations: Actor; rapper; singer
- Years active: 2004–present
- Spouse: Naomi Ambudkar (m. 2019)
- Children: 3

Utkarsh Ambudkar (/ˈʊtkɑːrʃ æmˈbʊdkɑːr/ UUT-karsh am-BUUD-kar; born December 8, 1983), also known by his stage name UTK the INC, is an American actor, rapper, and singer. He is known for his film roles including Pitch Perfect (2012), Game Over, Man! (2018), Blindspotting (2018), Brittany Runs a Marathon (2019), The Broken Hearts Gallery (2020), Free Guy (2021), Tick, Tick... Boom! (2021), and World's Best (2023). His television roles include The Mindy Project, White Famous, Never Have I Ever, Mira, Royal Detective, and the male lead role in Ghosts. He also appeared in the Hulu limited series The Dropout (2022).

He made his Broadway debut in Lin-Manuel Miranda's improvisational hip-hop show Freestyle Love Supreme in 2019.

== Early life ==
Utkarsh Ambudkar was born in Baltimore, Maryland, on December 8, 1983, into an Indian family. His father is Marathi and his mother is Tamil. He grew up in Gaithersburg, Maryland, where his parents, who had emigrated from India in the 1980s, were research scientists at the National Institutes of Health. He starred in comedy roles at Thomas S. Wootton High School in Rockville, Maryland, and he earned a Bachelor of Fine Arts (BFA) degree from the Tisch School of the Arts at New York University in 2004.

Through his mother, Ambudkar is a descendant of the lawyer and jurist Sir Vembakkam Bhashyam Aiyangar.

== Career ==
Ambudkar is a former VJ for MTV Desi. He appeared in the comedy film Pitch Perfect, as the character Donald, and in the television shows The Mindy Project and The Muppets. He was set to star in the Fox series Eat, Pray, Thug, but the show was not picked up. Ambudkar originated the role of Aaron Burr in the developmental readings of Hamilton. He formerly played Raj on the sitcom Brockmire. He played Jern in the 2019 film Brittany Runs a Marathon.

He played Skatch, a con artist, in a deleted scene of the 2020 Disney live-action remake of Mulan. That same year, he appeared in Disney's Godmothered, and then in the 2021 action comedy Free Guy. In 2020, Ambudkar debuted as the mongoose Chikku in the Disney Junior animated series Mira, Royal Detective. He is currently starring in the CBS supernatural sitcom Ghosts (2021).

He was a member of the musical group "The Beatards." Since 2005, Ambudkar has been a part of hip-hop improv group Freestyle Love Supreme under the name UTK the INC. As part of the group, he participated in the limited television series for Pivot in 2014 and made his Broadway debut in the group's self-titled show on October 2, 2019.

Ambudkar has appeared in several Youtube sketch comedy skits including the comedy groups CollegeHumor and Key & Peele. Ambudkar starred in Force Grey: Giant Hunters (2016) and Force Grey: Lost City of Omu (2017), a Dungeons & Dragons actual play web series with Matthew Mercer as the Dungeon Master, where he played the character Hitch, a rogue with a nefarious past. In 2023, he appeared as a guest player in Critical Role's third campaign, also hosted by Mercer, as the sorcerer Bor'Dor. In October 2024, he appeared on Eisa Davis and Lin-Manuel Miranda's musical concept album Warriors. He sang the role of Sully.

== Personal life ==
Ambudkar married his wife Naomi in 2019 and has three children.

He struggled with alcoholism in the early 2010s. In a 2023 interview, he revealed that he has been sober for eight and a half years. He also stated that his lack of sobriety at the time was why he was replaced as Aaron Burr in Hamilton. He told The New York Times in 2019: "It was ego, it was being a daily marijuana user, it was partying at night, it was being preoccupied, growing up as a brown person, feeling unattractive, and seeking validation of the opposite sex to sort of fill a hole, my self-worth."

== Discography ==
- The Gold Tusk EP (2006)
- Members Only EP (2012)
- Vanity (2019)
- Petty (2019)
- Self Respect EP (2020)

== Filmography ==
=== Film ===
Year	Title	Role	Notes
2007	Rocket Science	Ram	
2008	Last Call	Nikash	
2012	Pitch Perfect	Donald	
2015	Freaks of Nature	Parminder	
2016	Ride Along 2	Amir	
2016	Barbershop: The Next Cut	Raja	
2017	Basmati Blues	Rajit	
2018	Blindspotting	Rin	
2018	Game Over, Man!	Bae Awadi	
2019	Brittany Runs a Marathon	Jern Dahn	
2020	Mulan	Skatch	Deleted scene
2020	The Broken Hearts Gallery	Max Vora	
2020	Godmothered	Grant	
2021	Tom & Jerry	Real Estate Rat (voice)	
2021	Free Guy	Mouser	
2021	Tick, Tick... Boom!	Todd	
2022	The Ice Age Adventures of Buck Wild	Orson (voice)	
2022	Marry Me	Coach Manny	
2022	The Drop	Robbie	
2023	World's Best	Suresh Patel	Also writer and producer
2024	My Dead Friend Zoe	Alex	
2024	Doin' It	Sohan	
2026	Sender		

=== Television ===
Year	Title	Role	Notes
2010—2011	The Electric Company	UTK; Harry	2 episodes
2011	Danni Lowinski	Rasoul	Television film
2012	Freestyle Love Supreme	UTK	Television film
2013–2017	The Mindy Project	Rishi Lahiri	10 episodes
2013	China, IL	Aladdin (voice)	Episode: "Wild Hogs"
2016	The Simpsons	Jay (voice)	Episode: "Much Apu About Something"
2016	The Muppets	Pizza	3 episodes
2017	White Famous	Malcolm	10 episodes
2017	The Problem with Apu	Himself	Documentary television film
2017	Dimension 404	Alex Kapoor	Episode: "Chronos"
2018	Trolls: The Beat Goes On!	Master Controll (voice)	Episode: "Big Poppy"
2018	Bartlett	Sanjay Kahn	4 episodes
2018–2020	Brockmire	Raj	5 episodes
2018–2020	Harvey Street Kids	Fredo (voice)	17 episodes
2020	Mira, Royal Detective	Chikku (voice)	Main cast
2020	Central Park	—N/a	Songwriter: "The Park Is Mine" (with Rafael Casal)
2021–2023	Never Have I Ever	Mr. Manish Kulkarni	Recurring (season 2-4)
2021–2023	Blindspotting	Niles Turner	2 episodes
2021	Robot Chicken	Aang, Sora, Xenomorph Student (voice)	Episode: "May Cause Numb Butthole"
2021–present	Ghosts	Jay Arondekar	Main role
2021	Special	Ravi	3 episodes
2022	The Dropout	Rakesh Madhava	Recurring role
2023	Moon Girl and Devil Dinosaur	Anand (voice)	Recurring role
2023	Celebrity Jeopardy!	Himself	Contestant (season 2)
2024–present	Avatar: The Last Airbender	King Bumi	4 episodes
2024	Yo Gabba Gabbaland	Himself	Episode: "Little"
2025	Running Point	Malkeet Dasari	Episode: "Doljanchi"
2025	SuperKitties	Champster Glamster (voice)	Recurring role

=== Web ===
Year	Title	Role	Notes
2009	Hardly Working	Self (Freestyle Love Supreme)	Guest role; 2 episodes
2016	Force Grey: Giant Hunters	Hitch	Main role; 6 episodes
2017–2018	Force Grey: Lost City of Omu	Hitch	Main role; 20 episodes
2023	Critical Role (campaign three)	Bor'Dor Dog'Son	Guest role; 5 episodes
2026	Backyard Sports: The Animated Special	Achmed Khan (voice)	Animated special

== Theatre ==
Year	Title	Role	Venue	Ref.
2004	History of the Word	Ali	Crossroads Theatre	
2005	The Me Nobody Knows	Performer	Staged Reading, Vineyard Theatre	
2005	The Snow Queen	Kay	Urban Stages	
2007	History of the Word	Ali	Washington Irving High School; LaGuardia Performing Arts Center	
2008	Rafta, Rafta...	Etash Tailor	Acorn Theater/The New Group, Off-Broadway	
2008	Animals Out of Paper	Suresh	McGinn/Cazale Theatre, Off-Broadway	
2009	Dov and Ali	Ali	Cherry Lane Theatre, Off-Broadway	
2010	The Elaborate Entrance of Chad Deity	Vigneshwar Paduar	Second Stage Theatre, Off-Broadway	
2012	Modern Terrorism, or They Who Want to Kill; Us and How We Learn to Love Them	Rahim	Second Stage Theatre, Off-Broadway	
2013	Hamilton	Aaron Burr	Vassar College, Workshop	
2019	Freestyle Love Supreme	Himself	Greenwich House Theater, Off-Broadway	
2019–20	Freestyle Love Supreme	Himself	Booth Theatre, Broadway	
