= SuperKitties =

American animated television series

- Promotional poster of season 1 featuring the SuperKitties. Clockwise from left to right: Bitsy, Buddy, Sparks, and Ginny.
- Also known as: SuperKitties: Su-Purr Charged (season 2); SuperKitties: Su-Purr Wild (season 3)
- Genre: Superhero; Musical
- Created by: Paula Rosenthal
- Directed by: Chad Van De Keere (season 1); Sebastian Brodin (season 1; episodes 1–5 & 7–9); Andrew Duncan (season 2–present); Jouchelle Miranda (episodic; season 2); Bernice Gordon (episodic; season 2); Craig George (episodic; season 2–present); Kelli Bort (episodic; season 2–present)
- Voices of: Emma Berman; Cruz Flateau; JeCobi Swain (season 1-2); Landon Chase Dubois (season 3-present); Pyper Braun; Thea Gallagher (season 3-present)
- Theme music composer: Keith Harrison Dworkin
- Opening theme: "SuperKitties Theme" by Carmen Carter
- Ending theme: "SuperKitties Theme" (instrumental)
- Composers: Keith Harrison Dworkin (songs); Vidjay Beerepoot (music)
- Country of origin: United States
- Original language: English
- No. of seasons: 3
- No. of episodes: 75 (145 segments) (list of episodes)

Production
- Executive producers: Paula Rosenthal (2023–25); Sarah Mullervy (2024–present); Audu Paden (2024–present); Kirk Van Wormer (2024–present)
- Producers: Rachel Simon (2023–24); Steve Jacobson (2024–present)
- Animators: Bardel Entertainment (Season 1); Rainbow CGI (Season 1); Mainframe Studios (Season 2–present)
- Running time: 23 minutes
- Production company: Sony Pictures Television Kids

Original release
- Network: Disney Jr.
- Release: January 11, 2023 – present

SuperKitties (known as SuperKitties: Su-Purr Charged in season 2 and SuperKitties: Su-Purr Wild in season 3) is an animated superhero television series created by Paula Rosenthal for Disney Jr. Produced by Sony Pictures Television Kids, the series premiered on January 11, 2023. Prior to its premiere, the series was renewed for a second season in January 2023. Ahead of the second season premiere, the series was renewed for a third season in February 2024. Ahead of the third season premiere, the series was renewed for a fourth season in June 2025. Critical reception for the series was positive overall.

== Premise ==
In the city of Kittydale, an indoor playground called the Purr'N'Play is the home of many cats, including superheroes Ginny, Sparks, Buddy, and Bitsy. When trouble occurs in the city, usually at the hands of villains like Cat Burglar, Lab Rat, Mr. Puppypaws, Zsa-Zsa, and The Glamsters, the heroes are called into action by someone out in the town who contacts them. The cats enter their underground headquarters and transform into the SuperKitties, a quartet group who possess special abilities and high-tech tools. They use their superpowers to solve problems while showing kindness to everyone, including the villains causing the problems.

Season 2 has the SuperKitties sporting their new Su-Purr Charged suits that grant them new powers, while a new robotic pig Wiggles, is introduced.

Season 3 has the SuperKitties with their new wildcat friend Willa who is ready to help them in their missions as they sport their wildcat outfits when in the Wild Jungle outside of Kittydale. They also gain new villains in the Glamsters. Willa also became a SuperKitty starting with the episode "The New SuperKitty". Also starting with that episode, the SuperKitties received SuperKitty Cars.

== Characters ==
=== SuperKitties ===
- Ginny (voiced by Emma Berman) is a ginger Tabby cat with a pink SuperKitty suit who is the leader of the SuperKitties. She has claws that allow her to climb and poke objects. In her Su-Purr Charged form, Ginny's agility is enhanced.
- Sparks (voiced by Cruz Flateau) is a yellow Bengal cat with a purple SuperKitty suit who has timid and sensitive feelings, the smartest of the SuperKitties, and Buddy's older brother. He uses a variety of high-tech devices from his SuperKitty Kit to help with cases and connect with citizens. In his Su-Purr Charged form, Sparks can have the SuperKitty Kit assume Turbo Mode, with his boots taking on another form. In his Su-Purr Wild form, Sparks has the SuperKitty Kit assume Wildcat Mode.
- Buddy (voiced by JeCobi Swain in seasons 1-2, Landon Chase Dubois in season 3-present) is a Calico British Shorthair cat with an orange SuperKitty suit who is the largest of the SuperKitties, Sparks's younger brother and serves as comic relief. He possesses super-strength and has the ability to perform a Furball Blitz which turns him into a ball of fur and allows him to roll into objects. In his Su-Purr Charged form, Buddy can perform the Furball Blitz Bounce. In his Su-Purr Wild form, he performs the Wildcat Blitz.
- Bitsy (voiced by Pyper Braun) is a white Munchkin kitten with a sky blue SuperKitty suit who is the second smallest of the SuperKitties. Her Bitsy Boots allow her to move at high speeds. As the newest and second smallest member of the team, Bitsy records cases in vlogs on her tablet. In her Su-Purr Charged form, Bitsy's speed is enhanced. In her Su-Purr Wild form, Bitsy's speed is wild style.
- Willa (voiced by Thea Gallagher) is a magenta wildcat who lives in the Wild Jungle outside of Kittydale, and speaks with an Australian accent. Originally a recurring character, she officially joins the SuperKitties team in the episode "The New SuperKitty", utilizing a red SuperKitty suit. In her Su-Purr Charged form, Willa possesses a powerful sonic roar and performs a strong wildcat kick.

=== Allies ===
- Wiggles (voiced by Eric Bauza) is a robotic pig built by Sparks. He is later upgraded with retractable wings which would give him the appearance of a flying pig.

=== Villains ===
- Cat Burglar (voiced by Justin Guarini) is an anthropomorphic gray tabby cat who loves to swipe items.
  - Granny Catarina (voiced by Kari Wahlgren) is a gray tabby cat and Cat Burglar's grandmother who shares his passion for swiping things.
  - Sassy (voiced by Anika Noni Rose) is a brown tabby cat and Cat Burglar's country cousin who is also a burglar.
- Lab Rat (voiced by Ruth Pferdehirt) is an anthropomorphic rat scientist who creates high-tech devices for her own purposes, usually obtaining cheese.
  - Otto (singing voice provided by Jeremy Jordan) is an octopus who is Lab Rat's assistant and best friend. He usually does not speak, but occasionally sings in certain musical numbers.
  - The Burbles (vocal effects provided by Dee Bradley Baker) are toys that are programmed to do Lab Rat's bidding.
  - Roboctopus (voiced by Kari Wahlgren) is a giant robotic octopus. It later gained the ability to speak in later episodes.
- Mr. Puppypaws (voiced by James Monroe Iglehart) is a small brown and white Papillon dog with a Danish accent who is often seen riding on a motorized pet stroller. He owns a rubber duck named Quacksley that he often speaks to.
  - Dragonbreath the Glittery is a robotic dragon that is often used by Mr. Puppypaws and rides in a customizable side car attachment to his pet stroller.
  - King Fishy Fins is a goldfish who Mr. Puppypaws seems to treat as his brother.
- Zsa Zsa (voiced by Isabella Crovetti) is a vain sulphur-crested cockatoo who loves to sing, dance, and enjoy expensive luxuries. She has a soft spot for cute animals.
  - Lola (voiced by Pamela Adlon) is a sulphur-crested cockatoo who is Zsa Zsa's aunt and is also a singer.
  - Zsa Zsa's Squad (vocal effects provided by Dee Bradley Baker) are the budgie henchmen of Zsa Zsa.
    - George (vocal effects provided by Dee Bradley Baker) is one of Zsa Zsa's budgies.
- Pamster Glamster and Champster Glamster (voiced by Ginnifer Goodwin and Utkarsh Ambudkar respectively) are sibling golden hamsters who love anything fabulous, sparkly, dazzling, stylish and especially glamorous. Pamster is yellow and Champster is orange. They use a high tech hamster ball as a mode of transportation.

=== Recurring ===
==== Residing in Kittydale ====
- Amara (voiced by Carly Hughes in season 1, Kamali Minter in season 2–present) is the owner of the Purr'N'Play. She later creates the mobile Purr 'n Go to bring playing with kittens to all of Kittydale.
- Sam and Eddie (both voiced by Dee Bradley Baker) are a white-headed pigeon and a rock pigeon who are among the SuperKitties' callers.
  - Uncle Tony (voiced by Henry Winkler) is Eddie’s uncle who travels around the world.
- The Kittens Who Lost Mittens are three Siamese kittens who are among the SuperKitties' callers and often come to the Purr'N'Play.
  - Chibi (voiced by Emma Berman) is a dark brown and white cat.
  - Phoebe (voiced by Pyper Braun) is a brown cat.
  - Bibi (voiced by Cruz Flateau) is a brown cat.
- Boomer (voiced by Carly Hughes) is a French bulldog who is among the SuperKitties' callers.
- Captain FluffNStuff (voiced by Jan Johns) is a fluffy Briard dog who is among the SuperKitties' callers.
- Magda (voiced by Kari Wahlgren) is a bloodhound and guard dog of the Kittydale Museum who is among the SuperKitties' callers.
  - Rockland (voiced by Maxwell Simkins) is Magda's nephew who has a skill for sniffing out rocks and gemstones.
- Peanut (voiced by Gracen Newton) is a dalmatian puppy owned by a little girl named Nadia who is among the SuperKitties' callers.
- Brie Fromage (voiced by Ruth Pferdehirt) is a cheese sculptor who makes statues out of cheese that are often targeted by Lab Rat.
  - Colby Jack (voiced by Eric Bauza) is Brie Fromage's pet mouse who is among the SuperKitties' callers.
- Whiskers (voiced by Kari Wahlgren) is a Persian cat who is among the SuperKitties' callers.
- Gwen (voiced by Carly Hughes in season 1, Kamali Minter in season 2–present) is a Jack Russell Terrier who is among the SuperKitties' callers.
- Pickles (voiced by Simon Webster) is a small calico kitten who adores the SuperKitties and hopes to be like them.
- Lulu (voiced by Kari Wahlgren) is a bulldog who is among the SuperKitties’ callers.
- The Singing Squirrels (voiced by Dee Bradley Baker, Justin Guarini, and James Monroe Iglehart) are a trio of squirrels who make up a singing group. Whenever they are in trouble, they sing out their distress calls unless bystanders do not take them seriously.
- Chef Marci (voiced by Jennie Kwan) is a food truck cook who sells pet food.
  - Biscuit (voiced by Jennie Kwan) is a Tabby British Shorthair Cat and is Chef Marci's pet cat and is among the SuperKitties' callers.
- Harpo and Marvin (voiced by Dee Bradley Baker and James Monroe Iglehart) are mallards and are among the SuperKitties' callers.
- Poochini/Poochisimo (voiced by Alba Ponce de Leon) is a piano-playing Bichon Frise dog. The character was named Poochini in the first appearance and Poochisimo in the second appearance.
- Miss Poochytail (voiced by Kari Wahlgren) is a poodle who is friends with Mr. Puppypaws.
- Taylor (voiced by Izzi Rojas) is a hot dog stand owner who makes and sells hot dogs.
  - Frankie (voiced by Pyper Braun) is a Dachshund puppy and is Taylor's pet dog.
- Sigmund (voiced by Justin Guarini) is a turtle that is owned by a pet store owner.
- Renata (voiced by Jennie Kwan) is an American robin who is among the SuperKitties' callers.
- Polaris (voiced by Bahia Watson) is an astronaut cat.
- Coco (voiced by Becca Last) is a young raccoon who is Cat Burglar's friend. She would be the source of some of Cat Burglar's activities.
- Evie (voiced by Zoey Zanai McCrary) is a little girl who is the Glamsters' owner. The Glamsters have a strong bond with Evie and they will do anything to make her happy.

==== Residing in the Wild Jungle ====
- The Hoglets are four young hedgehogs who live in the Wild Jungle.
- Delilah (voiced by Pyper Braun) is a young koala who lives in the Wild Jungle.
- Stella (voiced by Emma Berman) is a young galago who lives in the Wild Jungle.
- Kiwi (voiced by Melissa van der Schyff) is a rainbow lorikeet who lives in the Wild Jungle.
- Bella (voiced by Kennedy Pitney) is a little bat who lives in the Crystal Cave in the Wild Jungle.
- Lollihop (voiced by Norah Nunes) is a colorful little poison dart frog who lives in the Wild Jungle.
- Elvis is a baby African elephant who lives in the Wild Jungle.

== Episodes ==
Season	Subtitle	Episodes	Segments	Originally released	
Season	Subtitle	Episodes	Segments	First released	Last released
1	—N/a	26	50	January 11, 2023	January 19, 2024
2	Su-Purr Charged	24	48	April 5, 2024	August 1, 2025
3	Su-Purr Wild	26	TBA	September 22, 2025	TBA

== Production ==
The series was first announced in April 2022. Season 1 was animated by Bardel Entertainment and Rainbow CGI; Mainframe Studios took over for them starting in season 2, with Infinite Studios providing additional animation assistance

== Release ==
SuperKitties premiered on January 11, 2023, with a simulcast on Disney Jr. and Disney Channel at 10:30 a.m. EST. It was later made available to stream on DisneyNow. The series was also released on Disney+.

In October 2024, SuperKitties was included in the Disney Junior Cinema Club, a UK-based interactive cinema experience aimed at pre-school audiences. The event featured screenings at select cinemas, including Cineworld, Vue, Odeon, Everyman, and Picturehouse locations. Designed to introduce young children to the big screen, the program combined episodes from Disney Junior series with interactive segments such as songs, games, and dancing. As part of the line-up, SuperKitties was showcased alongside other titles like Spidey and His Amazing Friends, Bluey, and Winnie the Pooh shorts.

== Reception ==
=== Critical response ===
Marsella Evans of Plugged In said that SuperKitties is a well-executed and lighthearted preschool series. She complimented the show's positive messages about bravery, kindness, and friendship, noting that the animal villains always learn from their mistakes. Evans found that the series maintains an age-appropriate level of adventure, ensuring a safe and engaging experience for young viewers. She stated that most episodes are wholesome and free of concerns. Ashley Moulton of Common Sense Media gave SuperKitties a grade of four out of five stars and said that the show models social-emotional skills through its team of superhero cats. She complimented the series for promoting empathy, teamwork, and kindness while ensuring that the mild adventure never puts characters in real danger. Moulton found that SuperKitties delivers positive messages about doing the right thing and helping others, with even the villains learning from their mistakes by the end of each episode. She stated that SuperKitties is an adorable program that effectively teaches young viewers about emotions and communication in a safe and engaging way. Marisa Lascala of Good Housekeeping ranked SuperKitties 7th in their "13 Best Toddler TV Shows" list. She said that SuperKitties is a good choice for toddlers and preschoolers, especially for animal lovers and superhero fans. She praised the show's social-emotional focus, highlighting how the superhero cats empathize with the villains' motivations rather than simply defeating them. LaScala found that the series combines adventure with valuable lessons in kindness and understanding, making it both entertaining and educational. She stated that creator Paula Rosenthal carefully studied cat behavior for authenticity and noted that parents might also enjoy the show's James Bond-inspired theme song.

=== Ratings ===
SuperKitties was the newest series among the top 10 most-watched preschool shows in 2024. It achieved significant success, with its toy line helping to expand its reach. By the end of 2024, the series was recognized as the No. 1 new preschool property of the year, according to Circana figures.

=== Accolades ===
Year	Award	Category	Nominee(s)	Result	Ref.
2023	Children's and Family Emmy Awards	Outstanding Main Title	SuperKitties	Nominated	
2023	Children's and Family Emmy Awards	Outstanding Voice Performer in a Preschool Animated Program	James Monroe Iglehart	Nominated	
2024	Kidscreen Award	Preschool Programming – Best New Series	SuperKitties	Won (Note: Tied with Star Wars: Young Jedi Adventures)	
2025	Children's and Family Emmy Awards	Outstanding Voice Performer in a Preschool Program	Kari Wahlgren	Won	
2026	Children’s and Family Emmy Awards	Outstanding Voice Performer in a Preschool Program	Pamela Adlon	Nominated	
2027	Children’s and Family Emmy Awards	Outstanding Music Direction and Composition for an Animated Program	Vidjay Beerepoot	TBA	
2027	Kidscreen Award	Preschool Programming – Best Educational Series	Superkitties	TBA	

== In other media ==
- In 2023, the characters from SuperKitties appeared in the touring live-action arena show Disney Junior Live On Tour: Costume Palooza.
- In August 2025, SuperKitties was featured as part of Disney Jr. Let's Play!, a three-day event held at Disney California Adventure Park and the Downtown Disney District. The celebration included a "Confection Purrfection with the SuperKitties" cupcake decorating activity and limited-time photo opportunities themed around the series. SuperKitties was also highlighted alongside other Disney Jr. shows such as Bluey, Spidey and His Amazing Friends, and Mickey Mouse Clubhouse+ in dedicated event spaces and themed displays.
