= Candy Ford =

American actress and comedian

- Occupations: Actress, comedian
- Years active: 1990–present

Candy Ford is an American actress and comedian. She is best known for starring in the sketch comedy, The Rerun Show, Ford has also appeared in other TV programs including: Curb Your Enthusiasm (Season 1, Episode 2), Will & Grace, and she provided voicework for the video games Law & Order and True Crime: New York City, and starred on the short-lived NBC sketch comedy, The Rerun Show and voiced Trixie in the film The Country Bears and later starred in Girls Behaving Badly.

== Impressions ==
- Sweet Brown
- Mary J. Blige
- Mary McLeod Bethune
- Bill Cosby
- Gary Coleman (as Arnold Jackson in Diff'rent Strokes)
- Richard Pryor
- Phylicia Rashad
- Roxie Roker (as Helen Willis in The Jeffersons)
- Danielle Spencer (as Dee Thomas in What's Happening!!)
