= The Rerun Show =

2002 American television series

- Genre: Sketch comedy/parody
- Created by: David Salzman; John Davies
- Directed by: Bruce Leddy
- Starring: Paul Vogt; Daniele Gaither; Brian Beacock; Danielle Hoover; Ashley Eckstein; Candy Ford; Donald Gene Reed; Mitch Silpa
- Composers: Scott Clausen; Rich Ragsdale; Jonathan Wolff
- Country of origin: United States
- Original language: English
- No. of seasons: 1
- No. of episodes: 7

Production
- Executive producers: John Davies; David Salzman
- Producers: Bruce Leddy; Annette Sahakian Davis; Roxie Wenk Evans
- Running time: 30 mins.
- Production companies: David Salzman Enterprises; John Davies Productions; NBC Studios; Columbia TriStar Domestic Television

Original release
- Network: NBC
- Release: August 1 – August 20, 2002

The Rerun Show is an American sketch comedy television series that aired on NBC from August 1, 2002 until August 20, 2002. VH1 also aired the show on Fridays at 11:30 P.M. The series was created by John Davies and David Salzman.

== Synopsis ==
The Rerun show spoofed many popular classics including The Jeffersons, The Facts of Life, Married... with Children, What's Happening!!, Saved by the Bell, Diff'rent Strokes, Bewitched, The Partridge Family, and One Day at a Time. Each episode consisted of two sitcom parodies poking fun at the actors who originally played the roles while twisting the original episodes' subtext. On some episodes, the original actors would make appearances (i.e. Gary Coleman in a Diff'rent Strokes parody).

The series started with strong ratings, debuting in the Top 10. However, ratings soon dropped off and NBC canceled the series after seven episodes. Cast members Paul Vogt and Daniele Gaither would later join the cast of MADtv, with Vogt joining the cast in season 8 shortly after Rerun's cancellation and Gaither joining the cast the following season.

== Cast ==
- Paul Vogt
- Brian Beacock
- Ashley Eckstein
- Candy Ford
- Daniele Gaither
- Danielle Hoover
- Donald Gene Reed
- Mitch Silpa

=== Guest stars ===
- Aries Spears
- Marla Gibbs
- Gary Coleman
- David Faustino
- Erik Estrada
- Dennis Haskins
- Todd Bridges
- Dustin Diamond
- Fred 'Rerun' Berry
- Alfonso Ribeiro
- Danny Bonaduce
- Alex Michel

== Episodes ==
Nº	Title	Air date
1	Diff'rent Strokes: "The Rivals" / The Partridge Family: "Keith and Lauriebelle"	1 August 2002
2	The Facts of Life: "Shoplifting" / The Jeffersons: "A Bedtime Story"	6 August 2002
3	What's Happening!!: "Rerun Gets Married" / Bewitched: "Divided He Falls"	8 August 2002
4	Saved by the Bell: "Jessie's Song" / The Jeffersons: "Florence in Love"	13 August 2002
5	One Day at a Time: "Pressure" / Saved by the Bell: "Miss Bayside"	15 August 2002
6	The Partridge Family: "My Son, the Feminist" / Married... with Children: "The Dance Show"	20 August 2002
7	"Married... with Children: "Weenie Tot Lovers & Other Strangers" / Bewitched: "A Bunny for Tabitha"	20 August 2002

== Ratings ==
- Episode 1 (2002-08-01) - 9.4 million viewers
- Episode 2 (2002-08-06) - 5.8 million
- Episode 3 (2002-08-08) - 6.6 million
- Episode 4 (2002-08-13) - 5.0 million
- Episode 5 (2002-08-15) - 5.9 million
- Episode 6 (2002-08-20) - 4.7 million
- Episode 7 (2002-08-20) - 4.5 million
