= Mad TV season 6 =

Season of television series

Mad TV
- Season 6
- No. of episodes: 30

Release
- Original network: Fox
- Original release: October 7, 2000 – June 23, 2001

Season chronology
- ← Previous; Season 5 Next → Season 7

The sixth season of Mad TV, an American sketch comedy series, originally aired in the United States on the Fox Network between October 7, 2000, and June 23, 2001.

== Summary ==
Mad TV began its 6th season with several cast changes. Pat Kilbane and original cast member Phil LaMarr left the show at the end of the 5th season. Returning repertory players Alex Borstein, Mo Collins, Michael McDonald, Will Sasso, Aries Spears, Nicole Sullivan, and Debra Wilson were joined by Nelson Ascencio (a featured player from last season) and newcomer Christian Duguay. Andrew Daly, Dannah Feinglass, Jeff Richards, and Stephnie Weir were added as featured players.

Cast members reprised many of their well-known characters and schticks. Alex Borstein and Will Sasso interviewed celebrities at red-carpet events, while Sasso performed celebrity impersonations of Robert De Niro, Lance Bass of NSYNC, Arnold Schwarzenegger, Louie Anderson, and Fred Durst of Limp Bizkit. Mo Collins appeared as Doreen Larkin, Trina Moss, Lorraine Swanson, and Liz Whitman-Goldfarb. Debra Wilson and Aries Spears appeared frequently as Whitney Houston and Bobby Brown.

The cast also added several new characters. Michael McDonald portrayed the Depressed Persian Tow Truck Man (later named Mofaz), an irritable American immigrant who uses pop culture references to illustrate his and his family's shortcomings. Stephnie Weir played Dot Goddard, a 7-year-old girl whose intelligence pales next to her twin sister, Karen (Alex Borstein), a child genius who has written several books, found cures for diseases and planned NASA expeditions. Michael McDonald and Mo Collins played Dot's parents, who treasure Karen but despise and often shun and abuse Dot. Stephnie Weir also unveiled the characters Mrs. Campbell, a curious old lady, and Dr. Kylie, an immature, party-loving doctor. Season 5 guests Seth Green and Susan Sarandon returned periodically during season 6.

Christian Duguay impersonated Jay Leno, President George W. Bush, and NSYNC member Joey Fatone. Duguay also played hyperactive teen Edward and Loopgarue of "Loopgarue & Hulahoop," with Mo Collins as Hulahoop.

At the end of season six, another original cast member (Nicole Sullivan) left while Nelson Ascencio and Dannah Feinglass were fired. Jeff Richards famously left in the middle of season six and was hired as a cast member on Mad TV's rival show, Saturday Night Live (becoming one of only two cast members to do so) and stayed on SNL for two and a half years.

Season six is the show's longest, with 30 episodes, as extra episodes were created in the event that a Writers Guild of America strike halted production. The episodes ended up airing in season seven as bonus episodes, but the streaming versions shown on HBO Max, Howdy, and Tubi have them as season six episodes. Viewers who saw these episodes during the seventh season can tell these are season six episodes because of the appearances of former cast members, Nicole Sullivan, Christian Duguay, and Nelson Ascencio.

Additionally, repeat sketches began airing under the Mad TV Encore banner, dropping the previous Mad TV Classic banner.

== Opening montage ==
The Mad TV logo appears and the theme song begins. Each member of the repertory cast, followed by the featured cast, is introduced alphabetically. The screen is divided into three live-action clips of each cast member performing recurring characters and celebrity impersonations during the introductions. When the last featured cast member is introduced, the music stops and the title sequence ends with the phrase "You are now watching Mad TV."

== Cast ==
Repertory cast members

- Nelson Ascencio (30/30 episodes)
- Alex Borstein (30/30 episodes)
- Mo Collins (30/30 episodes)
- Christian Duguay (23/30 episodes)
- Michael McDonald (30/30 episodes)
- Will Sasso (30/30 episodes)
- Aries Spears (30/30 episodes)
- Nicole Sullivan (24/30 episodes)
- Debra Wilson (30/30 episodes)

Featured cast members

- Andrew Daly (17/30 episodes; first episode: November 4, 2000)
- Dannah Feinglass (6/30 episodes; first episode: October 14, 2000/final episode: January 27, 2001)
- Jeff Richards (4/30 episodes; final episode: November 4, 2000)
- Stephnie Weir (17/30 episodes; first episode: November 18, 2000)

== Writers ==
- Bryan Adams (eps. 1–30)
- Tom Agna (eps. 21–30)
- Dick Blasucci (eps. 1–30)
- Alex Borstein (eps. 7, 9, 12, 30)
- Jeff Bushnell (eps. 1–5, 7)
- Garry Campbell (writing supervisor) (eps. 1–30)
- Xavier Cook (eps. 1–30)
- Steven Cragg (eps. 1–30)
- John Crane (eps. 21–30)
- Lauren Dombrowski (eps. 1–30)
- Christian Duguay (ep. 12)
- Brian Hartt (eps. 3, 13) (both Season 05 Encore)
- Michael Hitchcock (eps. 1–30)
- Jennifer Joyce (eps. 1–30)
- Scott King (eps. 11–30)
- Michael Koman (eps. 1–30)
- Lanier Laney (eps. 20, 22, 30) (All Encore)
- Bruce McCoy (eps. 1–30)
- Michael McDonald (eps. 1, 2, 5–9, 11, 13, 14, 16–18, 23–25, 28, 29)
- J.J. Philbin (eps. 1–30)
- Will Sasso (ep. 23)
- Devon Shepard (eps. 1–30)
- Bob Smith (ep. 14) (Season 05 Encore)
- Emily Spivey (eps. 1–12, 14, 29) (14, 29: both Season 05 Encore)
- Nicole Sullivan (eps. 28, 30)
- Terry Sweeney (eps. 20, 22, 30) (All Encore)
- Stephnie Weir (eps. 8, 14, 17, 23)

== Episodes ==
No. overall	No. in season	Title	Guest(s)	Original release date
117	1	"Episode 1"	Dave Holmes, Snoop Dogg, No Doubt	October 7, 2000
Britney Spears (Sullivan) meets her boyfriend Justin Timberlake (Sullivan) at his home on MTV Cribs; Sisqó (Spears) sings about fat ladies wearing skimpy bikinis; Oprah Winfrey (Wilson) hosts a reading of The Vagina Monologues with former First Ladies Betty Ford (Borstein), Nancy Reagan (Sullivan), and Barbara Bush (Collins); Will Sasso's little sister (Borstein) annoys him at a party; Kathie Lee Gifford (Sullivan) puts her children on Live with Regis; a doctor (Collins) has the misfortune of seeing Marvin Tikvah (McDonald) naked; Latina troublemakers Lida (Sullivan) and Melina (Wilson) are contestants on MTV Say What? Karaoke; a parody of Sex and the City featuring the empowered protagonists (Borstein, Collins, McDonald, Sullivan) taking it from behind. No Doubt perform "Bathwater". Featuring: Jeff Richards Notes: Christian Duguay's first episode as a cast member. Jeff Richards' first episode as a featured cast member.
118	2	"Episode 2"	Blythe Danner, Kathy Bates, Robert De Niro, Teri Polo, Jay Roach	October 14, 2000
A parody of Madonna's (Collins) "Music" about the singer's lackluster turn as an actress; an incoherent Whitney Houston (Wilson) re-records her classics for a compilation album; David Letterman (Richards) interviews Meg Ryan (Sullivan); drama ensues on a Mexican soap opera; a 1950s film warns viewers about premarital sex; Kathy Bates guest stars as Stuart Larkin's (McDonald) grandmother; a crippled stripper (Spears) entertains two women (Sullivan, Wilson) at a bachelorette party; film clips of his comeback concert reveal Elvis Presley (Sasso) was too drugged out to remember the names of his bandmates (Duguay, Richards); Will Sasso and Alex Borstein interview the stars and director of Meet the Parents. Featuring: Dannah Feinglass, Jeff Richards Notes: Dannah Feinglass' first episode as a featured cast member.
119	3	"Episode 3"	Barenaked Ladies	October 21, 2000
Bill Cosby (Spears) adjusts to life behind bars on the HBO prison drama Coz; a Fox executive (Collins) auditions comedians (Duguay, Richards, Sasso, Spears) to be the commentator for Fox NFL Sunday to compete with ABC hiring Dennis Miller for Monday Night Football; a Dateline NBC special shows scientific evidence that money and alcohol cause violent reactions in black rappers; a man (Duguay) fumes that he was not invited to a pizza party; Bunifa (Wilson) sends an audition tape to Survivor; a man (Ascencio) keeps interrupting a workplace seminar about sexual harassment with questions on what is and isn't considered appropriate behavior; the "Literally" couple, Judith (Sullivan) and Clyde (McDonald), argue with parents (Collins, Duguay) while riffing on a school play. Barenaked Ladies perform "Pinch Me". Featuring: Jeff Richards Absent: Dannah Feinglass
120	4	"Episode 4"	Snoop Dogg	October 28, 2000
Trick-or-treaters get a scare when they ask Cher (Collins), Enrique Iglesias (Ascencio), Macy Gray (Wilson), Angelina Jolie (Feinglass), and Janeane Garofalo (Borstein) for candy in a five-part sketch; Penny Marshall (Collins) directs and stars in a remake of The Exorcist with Rosie O'Donnell (Borstein) and Arnold Schwarzenegger (Sasso); a dim-witted kid (Duguay) struggles with geometry; an Herbal Essences commercial parody devolves into a Lifetime TV drama about a woman (Borstein) becoming a domestic abuse victim to her shampoo; when Bryant Gumbel (Spears) discovers why his show has low ratings, he makes a fool of himself before viewers; Direct TV cable checkers (Duguay, McDonald, Sasso) encounter problems with Diana Ross (Wilson). Snoop Dogg performs with Doggy's Angels. Featuring: Dannah Feinglass Absent: Jeff Richards
121	5	"Episode 5"	Chyna, Rebecca Herbst, Jacob Young, Jackie Zeman	November 4, 2000
George W. Bush (Duguay) sentences criminals to fry in the electric chair in a parody of Nelly's "Country Grammar"; Steven Seagal (Sasso) talks about voting; Al Gore (McDonald) visits Mo Collins backstage; Bill Clinton (Sasso) appears on General Hospital; on a special Reading Caboose, kids reveal who they would choose for President; Chyna and The Rock (Sasso) are interviewed backstage at a WWF event; Fighting Ron (McDonald) plans to get his girlfriend (Collins) to stop working overtime; George W. Bush (Duguay) appears on Reality Check; an animated short features George W. Bush and Al Gore in a rap battle. Featuring: Andrew Daly, Jeff Richards Absent: Dannah Feinglass Notes: Andrew Daly's first episode as a featured cast member. Jeff Richards' last episode as a featured cast member.
122	6	"Episode 6"	Mandy Moore	November 11, 2000
Nelson Ascencio talks about how honored he is to be the show's first Latino cast member; a parody of NYPD Blue; Mandy Moore takes questions from Mickey (McDonald); Lorraine Swanson (Collins) annoys a father (McDonald) and son at a miniature golf course; a black hall monitor (Spears) teaches Shirley Temple (Feinglass) how to dance like a black girl; Will Sasso and Alex Borstein interview celebrities at the premiere for Charlie's Angels; Ms. Swan (Borstein) goes through customs (Duguay); an amateur songwriter (Sasso) wins a date with Mandy Moore; the murdering mannequin (McDonald) commits a murder that leave two detectives (Ascencio, Duguay) stumped. Mandy Moore performs "Candy". Featuring: Andrew Daly, Dannah Feinglass Absent: Nicole Sullivan
123	7	"Episode 7"	Outkast	November 18, 2000
Lil' Kim (Wilson) promotes a salon that makes women look exactly like her; a parody of Britney Spears' "Lucky" has Hillary Clinton (Sullivan) dodge political scandal in her bid to become U.S. President; new game show Win Your Land Back screws over an African-American man (Spears), a Native American woman (Collins), and a Mexican-American (Ascencio) who have been promised a piece of the American pie after years of subjugation; 1950s puberty film Girly Time teaches a girl (Borstein) about the less-than-magical moment when a girl gets her first period; Trina Moss (Collins) celebrates Thanksgiving with her neighbors (Ascencio, Spears, Weir, Wilson); Allison (Borstein) breaks into song in front of a therapist (Daly); new birth control device is a miniature pilgrim (Sasso) who slut-shames anyone who engages in any sexual activity; Jack (McDonald) and Susan Caydel (Sullivan) trade insults while hosting This Cold House. Outkast perform "B.O.B". Featuring: Andrew Daly, Dannah Feinglass, Stephnie Weir Notes: Stephnie Weir's first episode as a featured cast member.
124	8	"Episode 8"	Cypress Hill	November 25, 2000
The camera won't stop cutting to James Gandolfini (Sasso) during a nominee's (Borstein) speech at The Excellence In Television Awards; M.C. Hammer (Spears) hosts his own talk show; Lida (Sullivan) and Melina (Wilson) become firefighters; an elderly woman (Weir) curiously asks hospital visitors (Borstein, Collins, Wilson) and patients (Sasso) questions; Stuart Larkin (McDonald) gets kidnapped and held for ransom by a white-trash couple (Duguay, Sullivan); Will Sasso and Alex Borstein conduct red-carpet celebrity interviews at the premiere for How the Grinch Stole Christmas; two blind singer siblings (Duguay, Collins) perform at a subway station. Cypress Hill perform "(Rap) Superstar" and "Can't Get the Best of Me". Featuring: Stephnie Weir Absent: Andrew Daly, Dannah Feinglass
125	9	"Episode 9"	Richard Lewis	December 9, 2000
Arnold Schwarzenegger (Sasso) is interviewed on the set of Stolen Identity; commercial parody for the Boogie Bass; a Persian tow truck driver (McDonald) complains to his passenger (Daly) about his life; a psychic (Weir) uses telekinesis in bizarre ways; Mad TV executives (Collins, McDonald, Sasso) hound Richard Lewis; Shaunda (Borstein) becomes a lounge singer in the employee bathroom; upset over losing the 2000 election to George W. Bush, Al Gore (McDonald) handcuffs himself to the Oval Office; Tiger Woods (Spears) promotes his new restaurant that reflects his Afro-Asian heritage; a postal worker (Ascencio) annoys his customers (Borstein, Daly, Feinglass) and co-worker (McDonald). Featuring: Andrew Daly, Dannah Feinglass, Stephnie Weir Absent: Christian Duguay, Nicole Sullivan
126	10	"Episode 10"	Everclear	December 16, 2000
A parody of "This I Promise You"; critics debate how cute the new TV series Ed is; Randy Newman (Sasso) records a Christmas duet with Madonna (Collins); Alex Borstein dreams of living in an age where full-figured women were considered attractive, only to find that it's no different than the modern age; the Grinch (Spears) attacks the baby Jesus; Dolemite Jr. (Spears) and his posse (Collins, Wilson) celebrate Christmas and retrieve his pimp cane; Michael McDonald, Nicole Sullivan, and Debra Wilson conduct interviews at the Billboard Awards in Las Vegas; James Brown (Spears) stars in Funky Xmas Story. Everclear performs "When It All Goes Wrong Again" and "AM Radio". Absent: Andrew Daly, Dannah Feinglass, Stephnie Weir
127	11	"Episode 11"	Lennox Lewis	January 13, 2001
On "This Week in Latin History", Nelson Ascencio talks about the creation of the piñata; the Gap troll (Borstein) goes on trial for attempted murder; Bunifa (Wilson) co-hosts Live with Regis; mob henchmen (Ascencio, McDonald, Sasso) suspect their new don (Daly) is gay; Lennox Lewis is taunted by Mike Tyson (Spears); on Dateline NBC, Jane Pauley (Borstein) interviews a high school counselor (McDonald) who has been implicated in ruining three students' (Ascencio, Spears, Wilson) lives with his irresponsible advice; a middle-aged couple (Borstein, Sasso) have some trouble ordering "Yanni: Live from Stonehenge" off of Pay-per-view; a woman (Collins) regrets online dating when she meets her date (McDonald). Featuring: Andrew Daly, Stephnie Weir Absent: Christian Duguay, Dannah Feinglass, Nicole Sullivan
128	12	"Episode 12"	Vitamin C	January 20, 2001
George W. Bush (Duguay) has difficulty reciting the Pledge of Allegiance; a Spanish-dubbed episode of Gilligan's Island; Michael McCleod (Sasso) and Jasmine Wayne-Wayne (Borstein) recap their singing career and sing a song saluting America; Loopgarue (Duguay) and Hulahoop (Collins) sing songs at a cineplex; two crackheads (Collins, Spears) try to repair their house on Crack House Calls; Bill Clinton (Sasso) prepares to vacate the Oval Office; Melanie Griffith (Sullivan) shares her plastic surgery recovery journal with Antonio Banderas (Ascencio). Vitamin C performs "The Itch". Absent: Andrew Daly, Dannah Feinglass, Stephnie Weir
129	13	"Episode 13"	TBA	January 27, 2001
George W. Bush (Duguay) and Dick Cheney (Daly) lose Air Force One after a night of partying in a parody of Dude, Where's My Car?; news reporters (Daly, Spears) predict the winner of Super Bowl with Mike Ditka (Sasso); a man (Sasso) does not understand that his girlfriend (Borstein) wants to break up with him; a parody of What Women Want has Helen Hunt (Sullivan) reading men's minds; a cop (McDonald) and a thief (Duguay) are trapped in a Mexican standoff; Antonia (Sullivan) screws up making a help wanted sign; two women (Borstein, Feinglass) fall for a handsome waiter (McDonald) who does not exist; a woman (Sullivan) pushes party guests (Ascencio, Borstein, Duguay, Wilson) to try her macaroni salad. Featuring: Andrew Daly, Dannah Feinglass, Stephnie Weir Notes: Dannah Feinglass' last episode as a featured cast member.
130	14	"Episode 14"	David Boreanaz, Incubus	February 3, 2001
Jesse Jackson (Spears) sings about his extramarital affair in a send-up of OutKast's "Ms. Jackson"; a parody of The West Wing; Radio Shack commercials feature Howie Long (Duguay) and a string of spaced-out actresses, like Teri Hatcher (Collins), Farrah Fawcett (Weir), and Whitney Houston (Wilson); an interview with a child prodigy (Borstein) is fondly interrupted by her non-prodigious twin sister Dot (Weir); Robert De Niro (Sasso) goes from big-screen movies to a small-screen comedy; the depressed Persian tow truck man (McDonald) complains to his customer (Weir) about his family; Rusty Miller (McDonald) interviews David Boreanaz. Incubus perform "Drive" and "Pardon Me". Featuring: Stephnie Weir Absent: Andrew Daly
131	15	"Episode 15"	Seth Green, Susan Sarandon	February 10, 2001
Ricky Martin (Ascencio) introduces his new music video dedicated to Cesar Chavez; Denzel Washington (Spears) speaks out against movies that were snubbed for an Oscar; Stuart Larkin (McDonald) gets a visit from the tooth fairy (Sarandon); Seth Green returns as mean boss Brightling; Trina Moss (Collins) thinks she's finally found love (McDonald); Susan Sarandon appears in a sketch as an annoying stewardess; a driver (Sullivan) gets a ticket for parking in a handicapped spot. Absent: Andrew Daly, Christian Duguay, Stephnie Weir
132	16	"Episode 16"	Dave Holmes, Freddie Prinze Jr., St. Lunatics	February 17, 2001
Whitney Houston (Wilson) and Bobby Brown (Spears) display their ramshackle house on MTV Cribs; Dave Holmes presents a collection of the best Mad TV music video parodies; NSYNC members (Ascencio, Duguay, McDonald, Sasso, Sullivan) star in their own movie; Rusty Miller (McDonald) accosts Freddie Prinze Jr.; Bill Clinton (Sasso) goes to the Grammy Awards; an Ally McBeal parody where Robert Downey, Jr. (McDonald) performs his role while in prison and Calista Flockhart (Sullivan) collapses from anorexia; a 1950's safety film has parents (Collins, Sasso) and a superintendent (Daly) show two teenagers (Borstein, Duguay) the dangers of listening to rock n' roll music. St. Lunatics perform "Ride wit Me" and "Country Grammar". Featuring: Andrew Daly, Stephnie Weir
133	17	"Episode 17"	Tony Hawk, Regis Philbin, Jay-Z	February 24, 2001
Fred Durst (Sasso) raps about how white guys can be rap-rocking poseurs like him; Regis Philbin hosts a celebrity edition of Who Wants to Be a Millionaire with Jay Leno (Duguay), Lance Bass (Sasso), Catherine Zeta-Jones (Collins), and Macy Gray (Wilson); Leona Campbell (Weir) talks with George W. Bush (Duguay) about recent votes in his favor; Marvin Tikvah (McDonald) goes on a date with his secretary Shelly (Collins); Will meets his idol Tony Hawk while looking after his annoying little sister (Borstein); Bernard Shaw (Spears) has an emotional meltdown on his last day at CNN. Jay-Z performs "I Just Wanna Love U (Give It 2 Me)". Featuring: Andrew Daly, Stephnie Weir Absent: Nicole Sullivan
134	18	"Episode 18"	O-Town, Green Day	March 10, 2001
Commercial for an anti-anxiety pill; promo for the new season of ER featuring an ever-changing cast; Fightin' Ron (McDonald) wants to learn why Kathy's (Collins) son has been called to the principal's (Daly) office; two doctors (Daly, McDonald) promote their engineering clinic; O-Town guest stars on Buenos Dias San Diego; Julia Stiles (Weir) gives away Save the Last Dance DVDs on Reality Check; Debra Wilson displays her Buddhist meditation garden, which turns out to be her cat's litter box. Green Day perform "Warning". Featuring: Andrew Daly, Stephnie Weir Absent: Christian Duguay
135	19	"Episode 19"	Patrick Fugit	March 24, 2001
The Dixie Chicks (Borstein, Collins, Weir), Charlotte Church (Sullivan), Bob Dylan (Duguay), Whitney Houston (Wilson), and Randy Newman (Sasso) perform a medley of movie songs that were overlooked by the Oscars; on Entertainment Tonight, Mary Hart (Collins) interviews Steven Seagal (Sasso); Hannibal Lecter (Sasso) stars in a parody of The Andy Griffith Show; Lorraine Swanson (Collins) takes a tour of Hollywood; Louie Anderson (Sasso) and Brandy (Wilson) host an awards show; a lost clip from the short-lived talk show Men Are from Mars, Women Are from Venus; Patrick Fugit reprises his Almost Famous role as William Miller, who is now given the assignment of interviewing Fred Durst (Sasso); Happy Folger (McDonald) reviews his adventures on a stranded island with Robert Zemeckis (Duguay) on The Charlie Rose Show. Featuring: Andrew Daly, Stephnie Weir
136	20	"Episode 20"	TBA	April 14, 2001
Erin Brokovich becomes a musical; Queen Latifah (Spears) screws up while hosting her own talk show; wannabe singers (Borstein, Collins, Sullivan, Weir, Wilson) audition for Popstars; what inspired Arnold Schwarzenegger (Sasso) to appear in movies is revealed; a modern-day revival of All in the Family has Archie Bunker (Sasso) struggling to be more politically correct; Lorraine Swanson (Collins) joins a couple (McDonald, Weir) in a hot tub; Darlene McBride (Sullivan) tries rapping with Dido (Weir) in her newest album. Featuring: Stephnie Weir Absent: Andrew Daly, Christian Duguay
137	21	"Episode 21"	TBA	April 21, 2001
In response to his controversial duet with Eminem, Elton John (Sasso) releases an album where he duets with other infamous bigots, like Saddam Hussein (Ascensio), Louis Farrakhan (Spears), and a posthumous duet with Adolf Hitler (Duguay); Jay Leno (Duguay) interviews Jennifer Lopez (Wilson); Edward (Duguay) works at a fast food joint; Julie Andrews (Collins) shows a lost scene from Mary Poppins in which Poppins uses illegal Mexican immigrants (Ascencio) to do housework for her charges; NBC's new programming schedule looks pretty disappointing; a couple (Spears, Wilson) thinks that their plumber (Sasso) is gay; Trina Moss (Collins) thinks she may finally have sex; a couple (Borstein, McDonald) has a tough time discussing their problems. Featuring: Andrew Daly Absent: Nicole Sullivan, Stephnie Weir
138	22	"Episode 22"	Tom Green, Green Day	April 28, 2001
Bill Clinton (Sasso) gives himself a Reality Check after Belma (Spears) and Tovah (Wilson) conclude that Clinton is too self-deprecating; Tom Green opens the show by sucking a cow's udder; Ms. Swan (Borstein) has an admirer (Daly); a driving instructor (Sullivan) gives a student (McDonald) no choice but to obey her commands; Bob Eubanks (Duguay) hosts a new version of The Newlywed Game; a man (McDonald) has trouble trying to return clothes; Dan Rather (Duguay) interviews Survivor contestants (Collins, Sasso, Sullivan). Green Day performs "Blood, Sex & Booze". Featuring: Andrew Daly Absent: Stephnie Weir
139	23	"Episode 23"	Ray Allen, Dwayne Johnson, Jay-Z, Memphis Bleek	May 5, 2001
George W. Bush (Duguay) shows off The White House on MTV Cribs; Kenny Rogers (Sasso) hosts his own Jackass-style stunt show; Karen Goddard (Borstein) shows off her cloning machine; a movie trailer blends every cheerleader-themed teen movie that's been released; Will Sasso interviews The Rock; Ray Allen makes a special appearance in a 1-800-CALL-ATT commercial with Mike Tyson (Spears); Marvin Tikvah (McDonald) sells his home to a couple (Duguay, Weir); Vera Mangus (Weir) returns for more psychic shenanigans. Memphis Bleek and Jay-Z perform "Do My...". Featuring: Andrew Daly, Stephnie Weir Absent: Nicole Sullivan
140	24	"Episode 24"	Cindy Margolis, Bob Newhart	May 12, 2001
A PAX TV-syndicated episode of The Sopranos is severely toned down for Mafia violence, offensive language, and a raunchy lap-dance scene; a depressed Louie Anderson (Sasso) bungles his way through Family Feud; Stuart Larkin (McDonald) torments his babysitter (Sullivan); Bob Newhart plays a psychotherapist with a tough love cure for depression; Cindy Margolis plays a restaurant hostess contending with waitresses Lida (Sullivan) and Melina (Wilson); while examining a patient (Borstein), an immature doctor (Weir) critiques her sense of fashion. Featuring: Stephnie Weir Absent: Andrew Daly, Christian Duguay
141	25	"Episode 25"	Chris Kirkpatrick	May 19, 2001
A parody of Will & Grace; the Vancome Lady (Sullivan) realizes she's performing the same schtick she did years ago; Arnold Schwarzenegger (Sasso) lends his voice to the sequel for Tarzan; Will Sasso and Alex Borstein conduct interviews at the Blockbuster Awards; Lorraine Swanson (Collins) is a contestant on The Weakest Link; Rusty Miller (McDonald) interviews Chris Kirkpatrick; Whitney Houston (Wilson) is honored on MTV Icon. Featuring: Andrew Daly, Stephnie Weir
142	26	"Episode 26"	TBA	May 26, 2001
Lorraine Swanson (Collins) torments her dance instructor (McDonald) before launching into a Flashdance-style performance; Steven Seagal (Sasso) plugs his new movie, When Harry Met Sally 2, on The Tonight Show with Jay Leno; Oprah (Wilson) forces Stedman (Spears) into being a butler while hosting her book club; James Lipton (Sasso) hosts a live performance of Death of a Salesman starring Regis Philbin (Borstein); the Depressed Persian Tow Truck Man (McDonald) complains of heartburn to his customer (Duguay); a bickering couple (Sasso, Sullivan) pretends to be happy while hosting company (Ascencio, Wilson). Featuring: Stephnie Weir Absent: Andrew Daly
143	27	"Episode 27"	TBA	June 2, 2001
Melanie Griffith (Sullivan) talks about her troubles in The More You Know; Rusty Miller (McDonald) wreaks havoc while working at a cafeteria; two hippies (Collins, McDonald) share their parenting techniques with a woman (Sullivan) at the park; a hall monitor (Duguay) tries to socialize with other students (Ascencio, Borstein, McDonald, Spears) and teachers (Collins, Sasso); a young girl named Angela (Weir) has a crush on an older man (Sasso); a father (McDonald) confronts his son (Duguay) about playing pranks on their neighbors; Bunifa (Wilson) gets her tonsils removed; a personal trainer (Sasso) gets too physical with his client (Ascencio). Featuring: Stephnie Weir Absent: Andrew Daly
144	28	"Episode 28"	TBA	June 9, 2001
Lance Bass (Sasso) and Tom Cavanagh (McDonald) share their thoughts in The More You Know; Denzel Washington (Spears) makes speeches to get cable; a teenage girl (Weir) visits a doctor (Sullivan) who reveals to be her boyfriend's mother; a Wal-Mart greeter (Collins) is taken to task for being complicit with Hollywood; a janitor (Spears) reveals that the Mannequin Killer (McDonald) has struck again in court; Bunifa (Wilson) disturbs movie theater patrons while on a date with a guy (Daly); The Rosie O'Donnell Show toasts The Lion King; a 1950's family (Ascencio, Borstein, Daly, Sullivan) uses double-entendres during dinner. Featuring: Andrew Daly, Stephnie Weir
145	29	"Episode 29"	TBA	June 16, 2001
Two doctors (Daly, McDonald) promote their clinic where they help people conquer their fears; The More You Know features Maya Angelou (Spears) performing spoken word; Stuart Larkin (McDonald) is the best man at his aunt's (Sullivan) wedding; two superheroes try to fight crime, but one is blind (Sasso) and the other (Daly) has a faulty voice box; the GAP Troll (Borstein) lets younger kids answer riddles; Bunifa (Wilson) goes to the Antiques Road Show; crackheads Walter (Spears) and Amber Hemphill (Collins) report a crime to a reporter (Daly) on the news; the "Literally" couple, Judith (Sullivan) and Clyde (McDonald), riff on a parade. Featuring: Andrew Daly Absent: Christian Duguay, Stephnie Weir
146	30	"Episode 30"	TBA	June 23, 2001
George W. Bush (Duguay) orders people to exercise their vote on The More You Know; Olympics clips showcase the Berukian team (Borstein, McDonald, Sasso, Sullivan, Wilson) performing unimpressively; Ms. Swan (Borstein) goes on a double date with her sister; a couple (McDonald, Sullivan) compare each other's orgasm faces; students (Ascencio, Borstein, Collins, Duguay, McDonald, Sasso, Spears, Wilson) auditioning to be background actors learn the ropes from a professional (Daly); a man (Ascencio) reveals to his family (Borstein, Collins, Duguay, McDonald) that he is gay, even though they already know. Featuring: Andrew Daly Absent: Stephnie Weir Notes: Nelson Ascensio, Christian Duguay, and Nicole Sullivan's last episode as cast members.

== Home release ==
When HBO Max streamed the series, episodes 1, 2, 3, 4, 5, 6, 7, 8, 10, 12, 13, 14, 16, 17, 18, 22, 23, 24, and 26 were omitted. This version is the same version that streamed on Howdy and is now streaming on Tubi.
