= Mad TV season 5 =

Season of television series

Mad TV
- Season 5
- No. of episodes: 25

Release
- Original network: Fox
- Original release: September 25, 1999 – May 20, 2000

Season chronology
- ← Previous; Season 4 Next → Season 6

The fifth season of Mad TV, an American sketch comedy series, originally aired in the United States on the Fox Network between September 25, 1999, and May 20, 2000.

== Summary ==
Season 5 of Mad TV began with only a few changes to the cast: Nelson Ascencio joined the cast along with Brooke Totman who became a featured player. This was the last season for Pat Kilbane and original cast member Phil LaMarr, and would be the only season for Brooke Totman. This would also be the final season for the Spy vs. Spy shorts.

The previous year's newcomers, Michael McDonald and Mo Collins, reprised their wacky mother/son duo Stuart and Doreen Larkin; separately, Collins played Lorraine Swanson and McDonald played Marvin Tikvah and Rusty Miller. Alex Borstein's Ms. Swan starred in the multi-part sketch "Swan: The Homecoming," which featured special celebrity appearances in each episode by Garry Marshall, Mark Hamill, Dennis Hopper, Susan Sarandon, and Tony Shalhoub. After a noticeable weight loss, Will Sasso began to impersonate more celebrities such as Elvis Presley, George Lucas, James Lipton, Richard Simmons, and James Gandolfini. Nicole Sullivan would be the first cast member to portray pop star Britney Spears. Aries Spears and Debra Wilson introduced a sketch called Reality Check, a fictitious talk show on BET.

Former Mad TV alumnus Artie Lange made a special appearance, as well as celebrities Carmen Electra, Catherine O'Hara, George Carlin, Regis Philbin, Tim Robbins, and Alex Borstein's Family Guy co-star Seth Green (as recurring character Mr. Brightling).

== Opening montage ==
The Mad TV logo appears and the theme song, which is performed by the hip-hop group Heavy D & the Boyz, begins. Cast members are introduced alphabetically. When the last cast member is introduced, the music stops and the title sequence ends with the phrase "You are now watching Mad TV."

== Cast ==
Repertory cast members

- Alex Borstein (25/25 episodes)
- Mo Collins (25/25 episodes)
- Pat Kilbane (25/25 episodes)
- Phil LaMarr (15/25 episodes; last episode: April 15, 2000)
- Michael McDonald (25/25 episodes)
- Will Sasso (25/25 episodes)
- Aries Spears (25/25 episodes)
- Nicole Sullivan (20/25 episodes)
- Debra Wilson (25/25 episodes)

Featured cast members

- Nelson Ascencio (4/25 episodes; first episode: November 27, 1999)
- Brooke Totman (6/25 episodes; first episode: January 15, 2000/ last episode: April 15, 2000)

== Episodes ==
No. overall	No. in season	Title	Guest(s)	Original release date
92	1	"Episode 1"	Lisa Loeb	September 25, 1999
In honor of reaching the show's fifth season, the cast opens the show with a musical number; Ted Koppel (Kilbane), Diane Sawyer (Collins), and Bernard Shaw (LaMarr) run for their lives in a parody of The Blair Witch Project; babies get their own T-shirts stamped with insults; Lisa Loeb sings the theme song for Pretty White Kids with Problems; Stuart Larkin (McDonald) gets trapped in a well; Britney Spears (Sullivan) argues with the crew (Collins, LaMarr, Sasso, Wilson) on the set of her new music video; Will Sasso and Alex Borstein conduct red-carpet interviews at the Emmys; Billy Blanks (Spears) stars in his own movie; a commercial parody for the Bible involves a married couple (Spears, Wilson) physically arguing with each other over their good news.
93	2	"Episode 2"	Busta Rhymes	October 2, 1999
Mo Collins' thank you speech to Fox is interrupted by various promos for their other shows; PBS tries to compete with The Sopranos with its own gritty drama starring The Three Tenors (Borstein, McDonald, Sasso); in a loose parody of The Sixth Sense, Hallie Kate Eisenberg (Borstein) realizes everyone in a Pepsi commercial is a ghost; Lida (Sullivan) and Melina (Wilson) get tickets to see Ricky Martin; a parody of American Pie takes place in Albania; John (McDonald) and Patsy Ramsey (Borstein) appear on Hollywood Squares; Ms. Swan (Borstein) has a trainee (McDonald) tend her store while she's away in Swan: The Homecoming; Phil LaMarr and Aries Spears see who can do a better Busta Rhymes impression. Busta Rhymes performs "Do the Bus a Bus".
94	3	"Episode 3"	TBA	October 9, 1999
Rick (LaMarr) reads a quote from The Book of Rick; Chris Rock (LaMarr) and Gerald Levert (Spears) star in "No Blacks on the TV Screen," a music video parody of "No Sex in the Champagne Room" about the lack of African-American actors on American television; on Politically Incorrect, Bill Maher (LaMarr) discusses sexuality with Britney Spears (Sullivan), Janeane Garofalo (Borstein), Bill Clinton (Sasso), and Chris Burke (McDonald); Spishak promotes a game where family members (Kilbane, McDonald, Wilson) trade insults; the Stick Chicks (Borstein, Sullivan, Wilson) confront a Russian mobster (Sasso); Jane Pauley (Borstein) interviews George Lucas (Sasso); a father (LaMarr) challenges his son (Spears) to some one-on-one basketball; Bunifa (Wilson) cuts in line to get some fly clothes.
95	4	"Episode 4"	TBA	October 16, 1999
Jesse Ventura (Sasso) dispels rumors about himself; what happens when the Scared Straight program is used beyond prison walls; Alex Borstein introduces a new Scandinavian pop group (Collins, Kilbane, McDonald, Sasso, Sullivan); Rusty Miller (McDonald) is a peer counselor probing his patient (Sullivan); VH1 goes Behind the Music to reveal how Eddie Murphy's (Spears) "Party All the Time" became a success; Kenny Rogers (Sasso) hosts his own psychic show; at a press conference, Hillary Clinton (Sullivan) makes some personal observations; a handless masseur (Kilbane) prepares to massage a client (Collins).
96	5	"Episode 5"	TBA	October 23, 1999
Due to budget cuts, Will Sasso and Aries Spears become DJ's; inspired by Eddie Murphy, Charlton Heston (Kilbane) stars in a new film where he plays every character in it; Lida (Sullivan) and Melina (Wilson) compete in a beauty pageant; Will Sasso and Aries Spears eventually get their jobs back; Steven Seagal (Sasso) meets the Dalai Lama (Kilbane); Mickey (McDonald) annoys a fellow passenger (Sasso) on a plane; more drama ensues in Pretty White Kids with Problems; a job applicant (LaMarr) constantly whines during his job interview.
97	6	"Episode 6"	Illeana Douglas	October 30, 1999
Alex Borstein's scary story is constantly interrupted by audience member Mickey's (McDonald) uncontrollable laughter; pandemonium erupts outside The Today Show while Katie Couric (Sullivan) interviews Debra Wilson; Illeana Douglas regrets appearing on Mad TV after studio executives (Kilbane, McDonald, Sasso) embarrass her in the green room; the Vancome Lady (Sullivan) insults trick-or-treaters (Borstein, Collins, McDonald, Spears) and gets run out of town; Scandinavian supergroup Hoppy Potty (Collins, Kilbane, McDonald, Sasso, Sullivan) performs a special Halloween song; Richard Simmons (Sasso) tries to make a hapless woman's (Sullivan) dreams come true; Lenny Kravitz (LaMarr) reads stories and performs new songs.
98	7	"Episode 7"	Rebecca Gayheart, Martin Short, Bush	November 6, 1999
Martin Short mistakes the cast of Mad TV for the cast of Saturday Night Live while giving them a warm up speech; on an updated parody of I Love Lucy, Lucy (Sullivan) and Ethel (Borstein) use the Internet with disastrous results; Swan: The Homecoming continues as Ms. Swan (Borstein) annoys the fellow passengers (LaMarr, Sasso) and flight attendant (Sullivan) on an airplane; on Entertainment Tonight, Mary Hart (Collins) interviews actors Rebecca Gayheart and Sean Connery (Kilbane) on the set of Blue Heat; Stuart Larkin (McDonald) befriends an ape at the zoo; MTV FANatic invites Will Sasso to meet his idol, Nicole Sullivan. Bush performs "The Chemicals Between Us".
99	8	"Episode 8"	Artie Lange, Mitch Pileggi	November 13, 1999
In a parody of Fight Club, the men (Kilbane, McDonald) fight like girls; Lorraine Swanson (Collins) competes on Who Wants to Be a Millionaire; the hosts of Reality Check (Spears, Wilson) interview Martha Stewart (Collins); Reading Caboose recalls how JFK was killed; Mitch Pileggi is hounded by UBS deliveryman Jaq (LaMarr); a couple (McDonald, Sullivan) encounters troubles before sex; Andie MacDowell (Collins) appears on Inside the Actors Studio; Artie Lange talks to remaining original cast members Phil LaMarr, Nicole Sullivan, and Debra Wilson about how he's been doing since he left the show.
100	9	"Episode 9"	TBA	November 20, 1999
Lida (Sullivan) and Melina (Wilson) force Michael McDonald to perform his Stuart Larkin character; the first gay rapper, Def Con 1 (LaMarr), is introduced; the O'Malley parents (Collins, McDonald) embarrass their daughter Mimi (Sullivan) with their nudity at Thanksgiving; Will Sasso and Alex Borstein interview celebrities at the premiere of The World Is Not Enough; the son of Dolemite (Spears) matches wits with Blackbelt Jones (LaMarr); Michael McLoud (Sasso) and Jasmine Wayne-Wayne (Borstein) perform a new song that sounds completely identical to their previous one; Antonia (Sullivan) falls in love with her pottery teacher (Kilbane).
101	10	"Episode 10"	TBA	November 27, 1999
Aries Spears invites an audience member to perform a sketch with him onstage; Melanie Griffith (Sullivan) and Antonio Banderas (Kilbane) are interviewed; Lida (Sullivan) and Melina (Wilson) accost Ricky Martin (Ascencio) in his apartment; a parody of Martial Law; Dateline NBC examines a new black teen drama modeled on Dawson's Creek; the Gap troll (Borstein) initiates a new trainee (Sasso); on Buenos Dias, San Diego, hosts and guests (Ascencio, Collins, Sasso) speak a mixture of Spanish and English; a director (Sullivan) gets frustrated when two actors (LaMarr, McDonald) keep flubbing their lines while filming a serious scene in a movie. Featuring: Nelson Ascencio Notes: Nelson Ascensio's first episode as a featured cast member.
102	11	"Episode 11"	Blondie	December 11, 1999
Ms. Swan (Borstein) performs with Blondie; a youngster (Borstein) visits Santa's (Sasso) third-world workshop; a parody of Mariah Carey's (Wilson) "Heartbreaker"; a woman (Sullivan) insults her husband (Kilbane) while he tries to string Christmas lights; Darlene McBride (Sullivan) promotes her new Christmas album; William Shatner (Sasso) recalls Martin Lawrence's (Spears) brushes with death; Debbie Harry plays a mini-mart owner whose customers are Doreen (Collins) and Stuart Larkin (McDonald); a man (LaMarr) sends his friend (Sasso) on a blind date with a girl (Borstein) who randomly bursts out into song whenever she's nervous. Blondie performs "Maria" and "Call Me". Absent: Nelson Ascencio
103	12	"Episode 12"	98 Degrees	January 8, 2000
Steven Seagal (Sasso) wishes everyone a Happy New Year; Fox introduces a new show about a teenage president (Borstein); Tovah McQueen (Wilson) and Belma Buttons (Spears) interview Donald Trump (Kilbane) on Reality Check; Monica Lewinsky (Borstein) gets hounded about her affair with Bill Clinton while promoting her new handbags; Will Sasso and Alex Borstein interview celebrities at the Billboard Music Awards; Lorraine (Collins) goes to a second-hand gift shop; TRL premieres a new music video with pop group 98 Degrees and The Three Tenors (Borstein, McDonald, Sasso); Judith (Sullivan) and Clyde (McDonald) insult little league baseball players; a street gang consisting of Teletubbies, a drunken California Raisin, and a suicidal Furby are featured on a new installment of Clops. Absent: Nelson Ascencio
104	13	"Episode 13"	TBA	January 15, 2000
Melissa Etheridge (Collins) and Julie Cypher (Borstein) share the news about David Crosby (Sasso) being the new father of their children; Bill Clinton (Sasso) sings about his many trysts in a send-up of the one-hit wonder song "Mambo No. 5"; Spishak promotes a board game based on Angela's Ashes; an alien-in-disguise (Kilbane) runs for President; Marvin Tikvah (McDonald) hits on his yoga instructor (Collins); Kenny Rogers (Sasso) and Dolly Parton (Borstein) star in a Broadway version of Grease; some college frat boys (Kilbane, Sasso, Spears) have a crazy night out driving; the background singers for the Time of Your Life theme song reveal that Jennifer Love Hewitt (Totman) made a bad career choice leaving Party of Five; two scary thugs (Sasso, Spears) show a couple (Kilbane, Sullivan) that they're good at taking care of babies; behind the scenes of her new show, Tactical Intelligence Team, Pamela Anderson (Collins) acts like a prima donna; two coffee house singers (Borstein, Collins) perform on stage. Featuring: Brooke Totman Absent: Nelson Ascencio, Phil LaMarr Notes: Brooke Totman's first episode as a featured cast member.
105	14	"Episode 14"	Tim Robbins	January 29, 2000
Aries Spears appears as Jesse Jackson sans makeup; on Blind Date, host Roger Lodge (Kilbane) sets up O.J. Simpson (Spears) with a woman (Collins) who's afraid that she'll be his next victim; Linda Ellerbee (Borstein) presents a color episode of the Rocket Revengers; the first African-American country singer (LaMarr) appears on Crook & Chase; another installment of Stick Chicks sees Echo (Borstein) as the odd woman out; Martha Stewart (Collins) appears as a guest on The Captain Kirk Show; Tim Robbins appears on Reading Caboose; a sketch where a woman (Sullivan) gets herself in trouble with her boss (LaMarr) has three different endings. Absent: Nelson Ascencio, Brooke Totman
106	15	"Episode 15"	Todd Bridges, Carmen Electra, Mark Hamill, Third Eye Blind	February 5, 2000
Lorraine Swanson (Collins) wins the "Introduce an Episode of Mad TV" contest; a parody of Being John Malkovich has a woman (Borstein) going inside the mind of singer James Brown (Spears); skanky slut Rosa (Collins) interferes with Lida's (Sullivan) marriage plans; Todd Bridges stars in one of three ads for a candy bar; while Will Sasso makes a video letter to his crush, his sister (Borstein) makes embarrassing comments about him; Mark Hamill guest stars as the father of Ms. Swan (Borstein); during her driving test, Bunifa (Wilson) gets her teacher (McDonald) in trouble with some gangsters; Carmen Electra is a guest on Funky Walker, Dirty Talker. Third Eye Blind performs "Never Let You Go". Absent: Nelson Ascencio, Brooke Totman
107	16	"Episode 16"	David James Elliott, Regis Philbin, Q-Tip	February 12, 2000
Regis Philbin has some problems with the writing staff (Kilbane, Sasso) and hosts a special political edition of Who Wants to Be a Millionaire where the contestants are Al Gore (Kilbane), Alan Keyes (Spears), and Jesse Ventura (Sasso); Tommy Hilfiger (Kilbane) offers Tovah (Wilson) and Belma (Spears) plus-sized clothing on Reality Check; David James Elliott appears on an episode of Reading Caboose; Stuart Larkin (McDonald) goes to the pet shop; a murderer (McDonald) poses as a mannequin; a man (Ascencio) has a dinner date with himself. Q-Tip performs "Vivrant Thing". Featuring: Nelson Ascencio Absent: Phil LaMarr, Nicole Sullivan, Brooke Totman
108	17	"Episode 17"	Tyra Banks, Seth Green, Earth, Wind & Fire	February 19, 2000
Michael McDonald re-enacts his brief scenes from the first two Austin Powers movies for Seth Green; two talk-show hosts (Borstein, Wilson) talk about a foundation for single unwed mothers; Rusty Miller (McDonald) plays arcade trivia with his soon-to-be girlfriend (Collins); Seth Green plays a boss who terrorizes employees (Sasso, Spears, Wilson) with the help of his equally deranged mother (Borstein); Tyra Banks plays one of many club members who use the names of Disney characters as nicknames; while on an alien planet, the son of Dolemite (Spears) calls upon legendary funk group Earth Wind & Fire to stop the forces of earth, wind, and fire. Earth, Wind & Fire perform "Shining Star" and "September". Featuring: Brooke Totman Absent: Nelson Ascencio, Phil LaMarr, Nicole Sullivan
109	18	"Episode 18"	George Carlin, Tony Shalhoub, The Cure	February 26, 2000
Fox's newest sitcom has Malcolm X (Spears) as the sane man in a trashily casual family; Paul Timberman (Sasso) suffers bloody mishaps while plugging the Wondertool 2000; Lorraine Swanson (Collins) bothers an employee (McDonald) at an all-you-can-eat bar; Michael McDonald and Nicole Sullivan audition for the crime drama Law & Order; a redneck named Ron (McDonald) makes an ass of himself at a bar; Tony Shalhoub appears as a cab driver and performs a musical number with Ms. Swan (Borstein); George Carlin appears in a Touched by an Angel parody for those who don't believe in God. The Cure perform "Maybe Someday" and "In Between Days". Absent: Nelson Ascencio, Phil LaMarr, Brooke Totman
110	19	"Mad TV's Night at the Movies"	Marc Anthony	March 18, 2000
Michael McLoud (Sasso) and Jasmine Wayne-Wayne (Borstein) open Mad TV's Night at the Movies with a medley of songs they've written for various films; now you can enjoy the atmosphere of movie theaters in your own home courtesy of Spishak Industries; Steven Seagal (Sasso) stars in a movie with an entire scene filmed in letterbox format; Charlton Heston (Kilbane) is a guest on Reality Check; a parody of Girl, Interrupted features Ginger Spice (Borstein); lost footage from The Wizard of Oz has Dorothy (Collins), The Scarecrow (Kilbane), The Tin Man (McDonald), and The Cowardly Lion (Sasso) joined by a one-legged slave (Spears); Elvis Presley (Sasso) stars in a musical version of Planet of the Apes; Master P (Spears) and Mystikal (Wilson) play the leads in a remake of Casablanca. Marc Anthony performs "You Sang to Me" and "I Need to Know". Featuring: Brooke Totman Absent: Nelson Ascencio, Phil LaMarr, Nicole Sullivan
111	20	"Episode 20"	Creed	April 8, 2000
Celine Dion (Collins) announces her replacement (Borstein) during a farewell tour; William Shatner (Sasso) promotes his own sperm bank; Elvis Presley (Sasso) reminisces with his bandmates (Kilbane, McDonald) in a three-part sketch; the Stick Chicks (Borstein, Sullivan, Wilson) confront a plutonium thief (Sasso); a Turkish man (Kilbane) posts a personal ad; a woman (Sullivan) interrupts a funeral with incessant phone calls; a crime drama focuses on two cops, one entirely covered in white (Borstein) and another covered in black (Spears). Creed performs "Higher". Featuring: Nelson Ascencio, Brooke Totman Absent: Phil LaMarr
112	21	"Episode 21"	Judge Joe Brown	April 15, 2000
Luke Perry (Kilbane), Method Man (Spears), Martha Stewart (Collins), Dionne Warwick (Wilson), John Ramsey (McDonald), and Patsy Ramsey (Borstein) list their favorite one-hit wonders on The List; Jewel (Collins) hosts her own show; Jack Nicholson (Kilbane), Prince (LaMarr), and Steven Seagal (Sasso) will not let Eddie Murphy (Spears) join their slumber party; a Scotsman (Sasso) reveals antiques' past uses at an Antiques Roadshow; a nerd (Totman) is ecstatic to meet Shania Twain (Collins) on MTV FANatic; during a wedding reception, a woman (Totman) makes out publicly with her lover (Sasso); Allison (Borstein) sings before being promoted to chairwoman; Bunifa (Wilson) goes to trial on Judge Joe Brown. Featuring: Brooke Totman Absent: Nelson Ascencio, Nicole Sullivan Notes: Phil LaMarr's last episode as a cast member. Brooke Totman's last episode as a featured cast member.
113	22	"Episode 22"	David Arquette, Sting, Goo Goo Dolls	April 29, 2000
David Arquette becomes the new El Asso Wipo and faces against Sting; the Sopranos (Sasso, Collins, Kilbane) are contestants on Family Feud and frequently act impolite; scaredy-cat Mickey's (McDonald) laugh causes another patient (Borstein) to have a heart attack; Lida (Sullivan) and Melina (Wilson) roller-skate into a gym with several buff members; Stuart Larkin (McDonald) joins his mother Doreen (Collins) and her coworker Linda (Sullivan) at work; John (McDonald) and Patsy Ramsey (Borstein) receive hostile comments from callers while hosting their own talk show; the Power Friends (Arquette, Kilbane, Sasso) promote their gym at a Baptists' church. Goo Goo Dolls perform "Broadway". Absent: Nelson Ascencio Notes: Phil LaMarr is featured in the opening credits for the remainder of the season, despite no longer being part of the cast as of the previous episode.
114	23	"Episode 23"	Dennis Hopper, Garry Marshall, Susan Sarandon	May 6, 2000
Mad TV executive producer Andy Kessler (Kilbane) hires Susan Sarandon as a new cast member; Rusty Miller (McDonald) loses his virginity to a hooker (Sarandon); reporter Sam Donaldson (Kilbane) shows home movies and footage of murder attempts of the Zapruder family on This Week; Ms. Swan (Borstein) pitches Swan: The Homecoming to director Garry Marshall; James Brown (Spears) breaks into a woman's (Wilson) house to tell her kids a bedtime story; Lorraine Swanson (Collins) annoys a salesman (Sasso) while shopping for a bed. Absent: Nelson Ascencio, Nicole Sullivan
115	24	"Episode 24"	George Carlin, Catherine O'Hara, Tony Shalhoub	May 13, 2000
Will Sasso becomes fat again in order to get more laughs; Cocoa Latite (Wilson) promotes a breakfast cereal made of afro hair; a modern-day parody of Laverne & Shirley; Aries Spears hosts his own show where he questions Will Sasso and Tony Shalhoub about their love lives; Catherine O'Hara plays a divorcee on a blind date at a karaoke bar; George Carlin disputes the veracity of the Apollo 11 landing on this installment of Reading Caboose; Judith (Sullivan) and Clyde (McDonald) attend a diving meet and get into arguments with parents (Kilbane, Wilson). Featuring: Nelson Ascencio
116	25	"Episode 25"	Tyra Banks	May 20, 2000
An episode of Love Connection set in the 1980s profiles the relationship between a Betamax provider (Sullivan) and a DeLorean dealer (Sasso); an employee (McDonald) reveals he has a crush on his boss (Sullivan); Tyra Banks plays a store manager who clashes with Bunifa (Wilson); Marvin Tikvah (McDonald) realizes that he cannot direct a film; a woman (Borstein) breaks her ankle and wants her date (McDonald) to get rid of her; Trina Moss (Collins) appears on Collecting Collectables; Miss Sylvia (Wilson) embarrasses students (Borstein, Sasso, Spears) again by announcing their prescriptions aloud; Antonia (Sullivan) tries to get a British guard to laugh. Absent: Nelson Ascencio Notes: Pat Kilbane's last episode as a cast member.

== Home release ==
When HBO Max streamed the series, episodes 2, 7, 11, 12, 13, 15, 16, 17, 18, 19, 20, 22, and 24 were omitted. The same version is used on Howdy and Tubi.
