= Mad TV season 7 =

Season of television series

Mad TV
- Season 7
- No. of episodes: 25

Release
- Original network: Fox
- Original release: September 22, 2001 – May 18, 2002

Season chronology
- ← Previous; Season 6 Next → Season 8

The seventh season of Mad TV, an American sketch comedy series, originally aired in the United States on the Fox Network between September 22, 2001, and May 18, 2002.

== Summary ==
During this season, Debra Wilson became the only member left from the original 1995-1996 cast, following Nicole Sullivan's departure at the end of season six. The previous season's feature players, Andrew Daly and Stephnie Weir were promoted to repertory players. New cast members hired this season include: Frank Caliendo, Kathryn Fiore, Jill-Michele Meleán (the first Latina to join the show and the third Hispanic cast member overall, after Nelson Ascencio in 1999 and Pablo Francisco in 1997), Taran Killam (the youngest Mad TV cast member at 19 years old, the only Mad TV cast member to get his start on a children's television show [Nickelodeon's The Amanda Show], and the second MADtv cast member after Jeff Richards to later be hired as a Saturday Night Live cast member), and Bobby Lee (the first, and only, East Asian-American cast member).

Guest stars this season included David Carradine, Michelle Trachtenberg, Todd Bridges, Vivica A. Fox, Frankie Muniz, Amanda Bynes, *NSYNC members Lance Bass and Joey Fatone, wrestlers Triple H and Stone Cold Steve Austin, The Man Show hosts Adam Carolla and Jimmy Kimmel, and rappers DMX, Ja Rule, Insane Clown Posse, Master P., Method Man, Redman, and the RZA. Trachtenberg's appearance is notable, as her performance in a Buffy the Vampire Slayer parody sketch netted Tratchenberg a nomination for a Young Artist Award for Best Performance in a TV Comedy Series.

This season is the last for Alex Borstein, Will Sasso, and Andrew Daly and the only season for Kathryn Fiore and Taran Killam.

== Opening montage ==
The Mad TV logo appears on the screen and the theme song, which is performed by the hip-hop group Heavy D & the Boyz, begins. A voice announces "It's Mad TV! Starring...," and then alphabetically introduces each repertory cast member, followed by the featured cast. The screen splits into several different live-action clips of cast members performing recurring characters. When the last cast member is introduced, the music stops and the title sequence ends with the phrase "You are now watching Mad TV."

This was also the first season to have an announcer for the show's opening titles.

== Cast ==
Repertory cast members

- Alex Borstein (13/25 episodes; last episode: April 13, 2002)
- Frank Caliendo (16/25 episodes)
- Mo Collins (25/25 episodes)
- Andrew Daly (25/25 episodes)
- Michael McDonald (25/25 episodes)
- Will Sasso (25/25 episodes)
- Aries Spears (25/25 episodes)
- Stephnie Weir (25/25 episodes)
- Debra Wilson (25/25 episodes)

Featured cast members

- Kathryn Fiore (16/25 episodes; first episode: September 29, 2001/ last episode: May 11, 2002)
- Taran Killam (13/25 episodes; first episode: November 10, 2001/ last episode: May 11, 2002)
- Bobby Lee (13/25 episodes; first episode: October 6, 2001)
- Jill-Michele Meleán (2/25 episodes; first episode: April 27, 2002)

== Writers ==
- Bryan Adams (eps. 1–25)
- Dick Blasucci (eps. 1–25)
- Alex Borstein (eps. 11, 13, 15)
- Garry Campbell (writing supervisor) (eps. 1–25)
- Kal Clarke (eps. 15–25)
- Chris Cluess (eps. 1–25)
- Gabrielle Collins (WGA Trainee) (eps. 4, 17)
- Steven Cragg (eps. 1–25)
- John Crane (eps. 1–25)
- Lauren Dombrowski (eps. 1–25)
- Michael Hitchcock (eps. 1–25)
- Jennifer Joyce (eps. 1–25)
- Kevin Kataoka (eps. 1–9)
- Scott King (writing supervisor) (eps. 1–25)
- Michael Koman (eps. 5, 23) (both Season 05 Encore)
- Bruce McCoy (eps. 1–25)
- Michael McDonald (eps. 2, 3, 5, 6, 8, 9, 12–17, 19–22, 25)
- Tami Sagher (eps. 1–25)
- Will Sasso (eps. 13, 22)
- Devon Shepard (eps. 1–25)
- Rich Talarico (eps. 1–25)
- Bryan Tucker (eps. 1–25)
- Mike Upchurch (eps. 1–9)
- Stephnie Weir (eps. 1, 4, 6, 17, 20, 22, 25)
- Jim Wise (eps. 12–25)

== Episodes ==
| No. overall | No. in season | Title | Guest(s) | Original release date |
|---|---|---|---|---|
| 147 | 1 | "Episode 1" | Joyce Brothers, Jennifer Aniston | September 22, 2001 |
A parody of "Lady Marmalade" featuring four of Mad TVs hottest recurring female characters (Borstein, Collins, Weir, Wilson); in this installment of Blind Date, a naive woman (Collins) goes on a date with disgraced politician Gary Condit (McDonald); Al Pacino (Caliendo) and Robert De Niro (Sasso) add star power to the Mariah Carey (Wilson) flop Glitter; Trina Moss (Collins) runs into former flame Jim (McDonald); Will Sasso and Alex Borstein conduct red-carpet interviews at the premiere of Rock Star; on Family Feud, Louie Anderson (Sasso) makes the family teams' (Collins, Daly, Spears, Weir, Wilson) last names sound racist; a woman (Weir) watches her pre-wedding video, where her pre-wedding jitters drive her insane. Notes: Frank Caliendo's first episode as a cast member.
| 148 | 2 | "Episode 2" | TBA | September 29, 2001 |
TRL premieres a music video parody of Sugar Ray's (Caliendo, Sasso) "When It's Over" about MTV abandoning its music videos for sleazy programming; Chris Tucker (Wilson), Sisqó (Spears), Rosie O'Donnell (Borstein), and Kenny Rogers (Sasso) compete on Fear Factor; Craig Kilborn gets his own fan club that only has two members (Caliendo, Daly); in the same vein as George Foreman, Mike Tyson (Spears) promotes his own grill; a hitman (Sasso) has trouble getting money from Ms. Swan (Borstein); a man (McDonald) tells his girlfriend (Weir) and her family (Borstein, Caliendo, Sasso) that he passes custom-scented gas; Björk (Borstein) becomes the spokeswoman for K-Mart; Whitney Houston (Wilson) and Bobby Brown (Spears) host a telethon for victims of "celebrity exhaustion," featuring actress Angelina Jolie (Collins) and actor Robin Williams (Caliendo). Featuring: Kathryn Fiore Notes: Kathryn Fiore's first episode as a featured cast member.
| 149 | 3 | "Episode 3" | Alien Ant Farm | October 6, 2001 |
Lance Bass (Sasso) hosts a talk show where his guests are Chris Tucker (Wilson) and Jackie Chan (Lee); Rusty Miller (McDonald) persuades moviegoers (Collins) to see the films he recommends; Jesse Helms (Daly) causes problems on the set of a commercial; Tovah (Wilson) is disgruntled that her Reality Check co-host Belma (Spears) has lost weight; Karen Goddard (Borstein) is interviewed on Good Morning, Phoenix; a man (McDonald) shows his girlfriend (Weir) video footage of him abusing his intellectually disabled brother as training for the Special Olympics; Michael Jackson (Spears) tries and fails to show everyone that he's still got the moves. Alien Ant Farm perform "Smooth Criminal". Featuring: Kathryn Fiore, Bobby Lee Absent: Frank Caliendo Notes: Bobby Lee's first episode as a featured cast member.
| 150 | 4 | "Episode 4" | Lance Bass, Emmanuelle Chriqui, Joey Fatone | October 20, 2001 |
Denzel Washington (Spears) tries his hand at a "black guy in drag" movie a la Eddie Murphy and Martin Lawrence; Mofaz (McDonald) displays his patriotism to his customer (Wilson); Liz Allen (Weir) runs into a childhood bully (Collins) who is now handicapped; Alex Borstein interviews the stars of On the Line; homeless couple Walter Hemphill (Spears) and his wife (Collins) volunteer to fight in Afghanistan; a bratty teenage girl (Fiore) cannot stand her so-called embarrassing parents (McDonald, Collins); on 20/20, Connie Chung (Lee) investigates the secret behind Aaron Spelling's (McDonald) hit shows. Featuring: Kathryn Fiore, Bobby Lee Absent: Frank Caliendo
| 151 | 5 | "Episode 5" | David Carradine, Drew Barrymore, Penny Marshall | November 10, 2001 |
Morris Chestnut (Spears) and Vivica A. Fox (Wilson) star in yet another urban romantic comedy; Kung Fu becomes a film starring Steven Seagal (Sasso) with special appearance by David Carradine; Oprah Winfrey (Wilson) interviews Kate Hudson (Fiore) and Jeannie Fanucci (Borstein); Rusty (McDonald) interviews Drew Barrymore and Penny Marshall; Bill Maher (Daly), Bill Clinton (Sasso), Tobey Maguire (Killam), Condoleezza Rice (Wilson), and Al Michaels (Caliendo) discuss Michael Jordan's return to basketball on Politically Incorrect; Mo Collins is offended when Stephanie Weir performs in a sketch that makes fun of her childhood. Featuring: Kathryn Fiore, Taran Killam Absent: Bobby Lee Notes: Taran Killam's first episode as a featured cast member.
| 152 | 6 | "Episode 6" | Todd Bridges, Mark-Paul Gosselaar, Christopher Titus, Jessica Simpson | November 17, 2001 |
George W. Bush (Sasso) conducts a manhunt on Saturday Night Live's Chris Kattan after seeing the flop comedy Corky Romano; Mark-Paul Gosselaar reprises his role as Detective John Clark in a spoof of NYPD Blue; Leona Campbell (Weir) asks Miss Cleo (Wilson) if she knew beforehand about the September 11th attacks; Todd Bridges guest stars in a parody of "You Rock My World"; Will Sasso shows everyone that kids love wigs; a paranoid TV executive (Titus) and his wife (Weir) are interviewed by Jane Pauley (Borstein) about the popularity of reality TV; Stuart Larkin (McDonald) is jealous when a newborn baby gets more attention than him; Fred Durst (Sasso) hosts an episode of MTV Spring Break; a commercial announcer (McDonald) tells three sad people (Borstein, Daly, Weir) that the best cure for depression is nothing. Jessica Simpson performs "A Little Bit". Featuring: Kathryn Fiore, Bobby Lee Absent: Frank Caliendo, Taran Killam
| 153 | 7 | "Episode 7" | Michelle Trachtenberg, Blink 182 | November 24, 2001 |
Senior citizens (Borstein, Collins, Weir, Wilson) complain about their new Bingo caller; NSYNC (Caliendo, Killam, Sasso) sings about irritable bowel syndrome; Lorraine Swanson (Collins) is a contestant on The Price Is Right; Oprah (Wilson) and Dr. Phil (McDonald) field questions from the audience (Borstein, Caliendo, Weir); Michelle Trachtenberg reprises her role as Dawn Summers from Buffy the Vampire Slayer in a sketch where she and her friends (Collins, Daly, Weir) meet Ms. Swan (Borstein); John Madden (Caliendo) reports from Iraq; on The Weakest Link, D-list celebrities (Caliendo, Collins, Killam, Spears, Weir, Wilson) play for their charities; a parody of Leave It to Beaver featuring Blink-182 as troublemaking kids from the 1950s; Will Sasso and Alex Borstein conduct interviews at the premiere for Harry Potter and the Sorcerer's Stone. Featuring: Kathryn Fiore, Taran Killam Absent: Bobby Lee
| 154 | 8 | "Episode 8" | Brian McFayden | December 1, 2001 |
Brian McFayden hosts the latest Family Values Tour event with Kenny Rogers (Sasso); a parody of 7th Heaven; Noah Slotnick (Caliendo) and supermodel Amber Valletta (Fiore) star in a new sitcom called Yes, Noah; Marvin Tikvah (McDonald) buys a Miata for his bratty daughter (Borstein); Randy Newman (Sasso) records an album of duets with Beyoncé Knowles (Wilson), Barry Gibb (McDonald), and Chaka Khan (Spears); Fox shamelessly promotes their various TV shows with the use of a green screen during Fox Nighttime; a store owner (Sasso) holds a going-out-of-business special; a washed-up actress (Weir) teaches a drama class; a Fox reporter (played by Mad TV writer Michael Hitchcock) asks Mad TV audience members what they think about the show. Featuring: Kathryn Fiore, Taran Killam Absent: Bobby Lee
| 155 | 9 | "Episode 9" | Method Man, Redman, Triple H | December 8, 2001 |
Triple H competes against Stone Cold Steve Austin (Sasso) to determine who will appear on Mad TV; a man (McDonald) is forced to shave and change his clothes after neighbors repeatedly mistake him for Osama bin Laden; a parody of Destiny's Child's cover of "Emotion" centered on Beyoncé Knowles (Wilson) stealing the spotlight; George W. Bush (Sasso) enlists the help of Triple H to fight in Afghanistan; Michael Jordan (Spears) is hounded by news reporters (Killam, Lee) for his poor performance on the court; a high school wrestler (Triple H) goes against an overconfident lightweight (Lee); Method Man and Redman appear on Real Motherf***ing Talk; Fightin' Ron (McDonald) enters anger management; Dorothy Lanier (Weir) prepares for her role in a commercial. Featuring: Kathryn Fiore, Taran Killam, Bobby Lee Absent: Alex Borstein, Frank Caliendo
| 156 | 10 | "Episode 10" | TBA | December 15, 2001 |
George W. Bush (Sasso) and Colin Powell (Spears) rap about world events; Santa's elves (Borstein, Collins, McDonald, Weir) are worried that envelopes addressed to the North Pole might contain anthrax; Kenny Rogers (Sasso) and his son Benny (Caliendo) wish the audience a Merry Christmas; Trina Moss (Collins) may give birth to a newborn baby in a manger; Destiny's Child (Wilson) and MC Hammer (Spears) send messages to the troops in Iraq; Will Sasso and Alex Borstein conduct interviews at the VH1 Music Awards; parents (McDonald, Collins) forget to buy Christmas presents on Christmas morning; a woman (Wilson) regrets begging Jesus (McDonald) to spare her husband's (Spears) life; Sandy Pym (McDonald) gives a pun-filled review on Lord of the Rings; a mother (Weir) is upset that her family (Borstein, Collins, Daly) doesn't like the Christmas presents she gave them. Featuring: Kathryn Fiore Absent: Taran Killam, Bobby Lee
| 157 | 11 | "Episode 11" | Ja Rule | January 12, 2002 |
Tovah McQueen (Wilson) and Belma Buttons (Spears) interrupt a speech by Tom Ridge (Sasso) and give him a Reality Check; Sydney Bristow (Collins) narrates her life in a parody of Alias; Shakira (Collins) shakes her rump and babbles in a parody of "Whenever, Wherever"; a rapper (Ja Rule) co-hosts Miss Cleo's (Wilson) psychic show; the Olsen twins (Fiore) star in a movie as Helen Keller; Bill O'Reilly (McDonald) makes fun of author Elizabeth Crane (Weir); the life of Andrew Daly is chronicled on an episode of MTV Diary; a student (Weir) pretends to be a werewolf to get out of trouble with her professor (Daly). Ja Rule performs "Always on Time". Featuring: Kathryn Fiore Absent: Alex Borstein, Frank Caliendo, Bobby Lee
| 158 | 12 | "Episode 12" | Usher | January 26, 2002 |
Cuba Gooding, Jr. (Spears) further sells out with his latest in a series of bombs; a convict (Sasso) plugs a new dating service for prisoners; a three-part parody of Antiques Roadshow where people from the year 3005 (Collins, Daly, McDonald, Sasso, Weir, Wilson) get late 20th/early 21st century artifacts appraised; Tovah (Wilson) and Belma (Spears) give fitness guru Richard Simmons (Sasso) a reality check; a former rapper (Spears) is now an office worker; director Chris Columbus (McDonald) rushes through sequels to Harry Potter; Mickey (McDonald) gives an audience member a standup therapy session. Usher performs "U Don't Have to Call". Featuring: Taran Killam Absent: Alex Borstein, Frank Caliendo, Kathryn Fiore, Bobby Lee
| 159 | 13 | "Mad TV's Rockin' Super Bowl Eve Spectacular" | Amanda Bynes, Frankie Muniz, Andy Dick, Wu-Tang Clan | February 2, 2002 |
John Madden (Caliendo) and Pat Summerall (Sasso) host Mad TV's Rockin' Super Bowl Eve Spectacular; Wayne Brady (Spears) performs an American salute to sanitation workers; William Coors (McDonald) reveals how his beer is made; an episode of Happy Days is filmed in Spanish; Ms. Swan (Borstein) causes a line hold-up at Starbucks; Whitney Houston (Wilson) and Bobby Brown (Spears) star in a commercial for a soft drink; Frankie Muniz and Amanda Bynes are interviewed by James Lipton (Sasso) on Inside the Actors Studio; Alex Borstein and Andy Dick get into a backstage fight with Christina Aguilera's insane cousin (Andy Dick) at the Teen Choice Awards. Wu-Tang Clan perform "Uzi (Pinky Ring)". Featuring: Kathryn Fiore, Bobby Lee Absent: Taran Killam
| 160 | 14 | "Episode 14" | Chris Klein, Rebecca Romijn | February 9, 2002 |
Baby GAP's new clothing line is modeled after racy attire from Britney Spears, Li'l Kim, and Jennifer Lopez; Wheel of Fortune has oddball pairings of celebrity contestants (Fiore, McDonald, Sasso, Spears, Weir, Wilson); Stuart Larkin (McDonald) makes a creepy video for his teacher (Weir); Chris Klein plays an executive who plugs a non-electric notepad; the Kappa Kappa Kappa girls (Collins, Fiore, Weir, Wilson) show highlights of their charity work; Rebecca Romijn and Jason Alexander (Caliendo) co-star alongside Arnold Schwarzenegger (Sasso) in a musical adaptation of Terminator 2; a man (McDonald) accidentally kills his best friend's (Daly) bird and targets any and all witnesses; Mad TV execs (Collins, Daly, McDonald) accost the stars of Rollerball. Featuring: Kathryn Fiore Absent: Alex Borstein, Taran Killam, Bobby Lee
| 161 | 15 | "Episode 15" | Stone Cold Steve Austin, Martin Short, Debra McMichael | February 16, 2002 |
Malcolm X (Spears) plugs a new brand of talcum powder for African-American men; Stone Cold Steve Austin sings with MC Hammer (Spears) and plays a neighbor of Fightin' Ron (McDonald); Public Schoolhouse Rock talks about using interjections when dealing with school overcrowding and a lack of good resources; Bill Maher (Daly), Roseanne Barr (Borstein), Penny Marshall (Collins), Robert De Niro (Sasso), and Jiminy Glick (Martin Short) discuss movie violence in a post-9/11 world; an episode of Family Feud with Steve Austin and Mike Tyson (Spears); Ms. Swan (Borstein) belts out a variation of "Dancing Queen"; Steve Austin (Sasso) and Debra McMichael star in Tony Little's (Steve Austin) push-up machine infomercial. Absent: Kathryn Fiore, Taran Killam, Bobby Lee
| 162 | 16 | "Episode 16" | Adam Carolla, DMX, Melissa Joan Hart, Jimmy Kimmel | February 23, 2002 |
New Barbie dolls are modeled after the spring break antics of Girls Gone Wild; Crossroads and A Walk to Remember merge in a new film; Dot (Weir) is a guest on Oprah; DMX gets advice from his similar-sounding mother (Spears); Stuart Larkin (McDonald) gets a new bicycle for his birthday; Adam Carolla and Jimmy Kimmel play figure-skating color commentators who join Scott Hamilton (McDonald) in harassing the performers with their crass remarks; a vodka commercial's promise not to glamorize alcohol for teenage audiences is broken; George W. Bush (Sasso) summons sorcerers Melissa Joan Hart, Jeannie (Fiore), and Glinda (Collins) to solve world problems. Featuring: Kathryn Fiore, Taran Killam, Bobby Lee Absent: Alex Borstein
| 163 | 17 | "Episode 17" | Danny Masterson, Wilmer Valderrama, Shakira | March 16, 2002 |
A contestant (Collins) is at the mercy of a probing machine on a dangerous game show; on a special episode of Friends, the gang (Caliendo, Collins, Daly, McDonald, Weir) deals with an African-American girl (Wilson); a parody of "Wherever You Will Go" has Alex Band (Killam) singing off against Scott Stapp (Sasso), Eddie Vedder (McDonald), and Ray Charles (Spears); Danny Masterson and Wilmer Valderrama play Jon and Ponch in a parody of CHiPs; Public Schoolhouse Rock teaches the correct use of nouns when being transferred to an American public school; Angela Wright (Weir) films a documentary about construction workers catcalling female passersby's; Rusty Miller (McDonald) interviews musical guest Shakira; Al Pacino (Caliendo) and Robert De Niro (Sasso) hold up a line in an ice cream shop. Shakira performs "Underneath Your Clothes". Featuring: Taran Killam, Bobby Lee Absent: Alex Borstein, Kathryn Fiore
| 164 | 18 | "Episode 18" | Corey Holcomb, Earthquake, Tara Reid | March 23, 2002 |
An installment of the hip-hop fantasy Lord of the Blings; a parody of "The World's Greatest" music video has R. Kelly (Spears) lusting after underaged girls; a Casio keyboard player (Sasso) is hired to compose the score for an action film; Corey Holcomb and Earthquake discuss the Enron scandal and Oscar nominees on Real Motherf******* Talk with Dollar Bill Montgomery (Spears); Tara Reid guest stars as a homeless single mother on an unfair game show; on Inside the Actors Studio, James Lipton (Sasso) gets hit with a stage light while interviewing Tara Reid; the Pussycat Bijou Theater features X-rated takes on popular pre-movie ads from the 1950s; Robert De Niro (Sasso) and Joe Pesci (Caliendo) use violence to promote various products in their newest film. Featuring: Taran Killam, Bobby Lee Absent: Alex Borstein, Kathryn Fiore
| 165 | 19 | "Episode 19" | Greg the Bunny, Insane Clown Posse, Master P | April 6, 2002 |
The Kappa Kappa Kappa sorority sisters (Collins, Fiore, Weir, Wilson) throw a spring festival; Robin Williams (Caliendo) and Whoopi Goldberg (Wilson) continue their long streak of starring in sappy tearjerkers; Mad TV gets retooled as a live-action Saturday morning kids' show; Insane Clown Posse, Master P, and Barry Gibb (McDonald) perform duets of "Love of My Life" with Michael McLoud (Sasso) and Jasmine Wayne-Wayne (Borstein); Dorothy Lanier (Weir) auditions as an extra for Greg the Bunny; MC Hammer (Spears) appears in a parody of Who Knows the Band; Jenny Jones (Collins) gives a stripper (Fiore) a makeover; a furious boss (Sasso) calms down whenever he is injured by his employees (Borstein, Daly, Fiore, Weir). Featuring: Kathryn Fiore, Bobby Lee Absent: Taran Killam
| 166 | 20 | "Episode 20" | TBA | April 13, 2002 |
New sitcom about two siblings (Borstein, Sasso) has an overly long opening sequence; two princesses (Collins, Weir) fight for the love of Prince William (Killam); two bald, socially awkward outcasts (McDonald, Weir) entertain themselves after getting kicked out of a party; Dorothy Lanier (Weir) runs into her former boyfriend (Daly) while going on a date with a senior citizen; Wayne Brady (Spears) sings a ditty about cotton; Lorraine (Collins) jams with a Dixieland band in New Orleans; a couple (Borstein, Sasso) spot Alex Borstein and Will Sasso at a restaurant; Bunifa (Wilson) causes havoc at an airport when she gets detained by security (Spears). Featuring: Taran Killam Absent: Frank Caliendo, Kathryn Fiore, Bobby Lee Notes: Alex Borstein's last episode as a cast member.
| 167 | 21 | "Episode 21" | Melina Kanakaredes | April 20, 2002 |
Melina Kanakaredes dreams that she's stuck in four variations of her show Providence; Walter (Spears) and Amber Hemphill (Collins) are contestants on Change of Heart; a man (Sasso) thinks his Asian friend (Lee) can remove stains from his silk shirt; Katie (Fiore) whines and complains on her family camping trip; potheads (Collins, Lee, Spears) laugh uncontrollably and discuss topics on a news show made for stoners; a defendant (McDonald) uses raunchy words to clear his guilt; a heckling father (Lee) berates his son into winning a baseball game. Featuring: Kathryn Fiore, Taran Killam, Bobby Lee Notes: Alex Borstein is featured in the opening credits for this episode and onward the rest of the season, despite no longer being part of the show's cast as of the previous episode.
| 168 | 22 | "Episode 22" | Preston Lacy, Chris Pontius, Steve-O, Jason Acuña, Tenacious D | April 27, 2002 |
A parody of "I'm Not a Girl, Not Yet a Woman" features clichéd visual sexual metaphors and a now-legal Britney Spears (Meleán); Joe Namath (McDonald) stars in a '70s sex ed. film on what to do if you have VD; Bill Maher (Daly), Bill Clinton (Sasso), Kelsey Grammer (Caliendo), Oprah Winfrey (Wilson), and Drew Barrymore (Meleán) discuss marriage in the modern age on Politically Incorrect; Dot (Weir) searches for her glove inside the dryer; the cast of Jackass joins Kenny Rogers (Sasso) in a series of outrageous stunts on Kenny Rogers' Jackass; a quartet of prisoners (Caliendo, Killam, Sasso, Spears) sings a ditty about recycling at a school. Tenacious D perform "Tribute" and "Lee". Featuring: Taran Killam, Bobby Lee, Jill-Michele Meleán Absent: Kathryn Fiore Notes: Jill-Michele Meleán's first episode as a featured cast member.
| 169 | 23 | "Episode 23" | TBA | May 4, 2002 |
Mofaz (McDonald) makes other psychotherapy patients (Daly, Killam) feel better about themselves; Public Schoolhouse Rock centers on the use (and overuse) of behavior-modifying drugs for children; an office manager (Sasso) with mental retardation annoys his coworker (Killam); a yoga teacher (McDonald) demonstrates creepy yoga poses and techniques on his morning show; a man (Killam) inspects guitars for sale, but is pestered by the music store staff (Daly, Lee, Sasso); after winning an award, James Gandolfini (Sasso) goes on a rampage when he can't find a way off the stage; an old, overweight man (Spears) complains to his neighbors (Collins, Daly, Lee, Sasso) that he passed out while masturbating. Featuring: Taran Killam, Bobby Lee Absent: Frank Caliendo, Kathryn Fiore, Jill-Michele Meleán
| 170 | 24 | "Episode 24" | Vivica A. Fox, Gay Men's Chorus of Los Angeles | May 11, 2002 |
A parody of JAG features accidental innuendo whenever someone interrupts someone saying "JAG officer"; women from the present (Collins, Fiore, Weir, Wilson) get transported to the past and fight beasts in campy action series Glamazon Huntresses; Bunifa (Wilson) is a contestant on Dismissed; a TV writer (Daly) pitches a stereotypically black sitcom to a UPN executive (Vivica A. Fox) who thinks she still works at CBS; a sketch about arguing neighbors (Collins, McDonald, Sasso, Weir) becomes a commercial parody for Sony cameras; Jenny Jones (Collins) tries to host a more respectable episode of The Jenny Jones Show by having Laura Bush (Weir) and her daughters (Fiore, Meleán) as guests; two guys (Lee, Sasso) pretend to be gay to pick up girls, only to end up being a gay couple; the Gay Men's Chorus of Los Angeles bring gravitas to the Mad TV stage by singing suggestive war songs. Featuring: Kathryn Fiore, Taran Killam, Bobby Lee, Jill-Michele Meleán Absent: Frank Caliendo Notes: Kathryn Fiore and Taran Killam's last episode as featured cast members.
| 171 | 25 | "Episode 25" | Method Man, RZA, Teri Garr, Eve Plumb | May 18, 2002 |
A patient (Sasso) suffers from pixelation when he gets naked; Rod Roddy (Caliendo) is the new announcer for The Lance Bass Show; a realistic parody of The West Wing features everyone (Collins, Daly, Spears, Weir, Wilson) in The White House enduring George W. Bush's (Sasso) speech on stem cell research; Ms. Campbell (Weir) doesn't make things any easier for the woman (Collins) who ran her over; Wayne Brady (Spears) welcomes actor Richard Dreyfuss (Caliendo) to his show; Teri Garr, Eve Plumb, Method Man, and RZA discuss the life of sleazy producer Marvin Tikvah (McDonald) on an episode of E! True Hollywood Story; Trina Moss (Collins) is about to marry her fiancé Jim (McDonald) until a guest (Spears) makes a shocking revelation; a man (Daly) finds the will to perform stand-up comedy after taking anti-depressants. Absent: Bobby Lee, Jill-Michele Meleán Notes: Andrew Daly and Will Sasso's last episode as cast members.

== Home Release ==
When HBO Max streamed this series, episodes 4, 6, 8, 11, 12, 13, 15, 16, 17, 20, 21, 22, and 25 were omitted. The versions shown on Howdy and Tubi also omitted episode 3.
