= List of Mad TV cast members =

The following is a complete list of Mad TV cast members which includes both featured and repertory cast members. The dates given are the dates of the season in which they first appeared as a player and the season when they left. Cast members who were only featured (never promoted to contract player) are highlighted. The original cast are listed in alphabetical order and all subsequent cast members are listed in chronological order.

== List of cast members ==
Cast member	Cast appearance		Guest appearance		Season		Episodes
Cast member	First	Last	Last	Total	Span	Total	Episodes
Craig Anton	October 14, 1995	December 13, 1997	—N/a	—N/a	1–3	3	23
Bryan Callen	October 14, 1995	May 17, 1997	—N/a	—N/a	1–2	2	42
David Herman	October 14, 1995	December 13, 1997	—N/a	—N/a	1–3	3	53
Orlando Jones	October 14, 1995	May 17, 1997	November 8, 2003	1	1–2	2	45
Phil LaMarr	October 14, 1995	May 20, 2000	September 20, 2003	1	1–5	5	112
Artie Lange	October 14, 1995	January 4, 1997	May 16, 2009	5	1–2	2	48
Mary Scheer	October 14, 1995	May 16, 1998	—N/a	—N/a	1–3	3	67
Nicole Sullivan	October 14, 1995	June 23, 2001	May 21, 2005	6	1–6	6	141
Debra Wilson	October 14, 1995	May 17, 2003	May 16, 2009	4	1–8	8	196
Tim Conlon	February 15, 1997	March 28, 1998	—N/a	—N/a	2–3	2	12
Pablo Francisco	February 15, 1997	May 17, 1998	—N/a	—N/a	2	1	4
Alex Borstein	September 20, 1997	May 18, 2002	May 16, 2009	4	3–7	5	122
Chris Hogan	September 20, 1997	May 16, 1998	—N/a	—N/a	3	1	
Pat Kilbane	September 20, 1997	May 20, 2000	—N/a	—N/a	3–5	3	75
Lisa Kushell	September 20, 1997	May 16, 1998	—N/a	—N/a	3	1	
Will Sasso	September 20, 1997	May 18, 2002	May 16, 2009	3	3–7	5	121
Aries Spears	September 20, 1997	May 21, 2005	—N/a	—N/a	3–10	8	198
Andrew Bowen	September 12, 1998	May 22, 1999	—N/a	—N/a	4	1	
Mo Collins	September 12, 1998	May 15, 2004	May 16, 2009	3	4–9	6	150
Michael McDonald	September 12, 1998	May 17, 2008	March 21, 2009	1	4–13	10	239
Nelson Ascencio	November 27, 1999	June 23, 2001	—N/a	—N/a	5–6	2	35
Brooke Totman	January 15, 2000	April 15, 2000	—N/a	—N/a	5	1	
Christian Duguay	October 7, 2000	June 23, 2001	—N/a	—N/a	6	1	29
Jeff Richards	October 7, 2000	November 4, 2000	—N/a	—N/a	6	1	
Dannah Feinglass	October 14, 2000	January 27, 2001	—N/a	—N/a	6	1	
Andrew Daly	November 4, 2000	May 18, 2002	—N/a	—N/a	6–7	2	41
Stephnie Weir	November 18, 2000	May 6, 2006	—N/a	—N/a	6–11	6	120
Frank Caliendo	September 22, 2001	May 20, 2006	—N/a	—N/a	7–11	5	117
Kathryn Fiore	September 29, 2001	May 11, 2002	—N/a	—N/a	7	1	
Bobby Lee	October 6, 2001	May 16, 2009	—N/a	—N/a	7–14	8	147
Taran Killam	November 10, 2001	May 11, 2002	—N/a	—N/a	7	1	
Jill-Michele Meleán	April 27, 2002	April 5, 2003	—N/a	—N/a	7–8	2	11
Ike Barinholtz	September 14, 2002	May 19, 2007	—N/a	—N/a	8–12	5	112
Josh Meyers	September 14, 2002	May 22, 2004	—N/a	—N/a	8–9	2	48
Ron Pederson	November 2, 2002	May 21, 2005	—N/a	—N/a	8–10	3	68
Simon Helberg	November 16, 2002	February 22, 2003	—N/a	—N/a	8	1	
Paul Vogt	December 21, 2002	May 21, 2005	—N/a	—N/a	8–10	3	66
Christina Moore	January 18, 2003	May 10, 2003	—N/a	—N/a	8	1	
Daniele Gaither	September 13, 2003	May 20, 2006	September 28, 1996	1 (Note: Gaither appeared in a sketch in the second season, making her the only cast member to make a guest appearance before joining the cast.)	9–11	3	65
Gillian Vigman	September 13, 2003	May 15, 2004	—N/a	—N/a	9	1	
Nicole Parker	November 1, 2003	March 28, 2009	—N/a	—N/a	9–14	6	113
Jordan Peele	November 15, 2003	May 17, 2008	—N/a	—N/a	9–13	5	95
Melissa Paull	December 20, 2003	February 7, 2004	—N/a	—N/a	9	1	
Keegan-Michael Key	February 7, 2004	May 16, 2009	—N/a	—N/a	9–14	6	106
Crista Flanagan	February 5, 2005	May 16, 2009	—N/a	—N/a	10–14	5	81
Spencer Kayden	February 26, 2005	May 21, 2005	—N/a	—N/a	10	1	4
Arden Myrin	September 17, 2005	May 16, 2009	—N/a	—N/a	11–14	4	76
Frank Caeti	September 17, 2005	May 19, 2007	—N/a	—N/a	11–12	2	39
Nicole Randall Johnson	September 17, 2005	May 19, 2007	—N/a	—N/a	11–12	2	37
Lisa Donovan	February 17, 2007	May 5, 2007	—N/a	—N/a	12	1	
Johnny A. Sanchez	November 3, 2007	May 16, 2009	—N/a	—N/a	13–14	2	28
Anjelah Johnson	November 10, 2007	February 16, 2008	—N/a	—N/a	13	1	
Dan Oster	November 24, 2007	May 17, 2008	—N/a	—N/a	13	1	
Daheli Hall	February 2, 2008	May 17, 2008	—N/a	—N/a	13	1	
Erica Ash	September 13, 2008	April 25, 2009	—N/a	—N/a	14	1	12
Matt Braunger	September 13, 2008	April 25, 2009	—N/a	—N/a	14	1	11
Eric Price	September 13, 2008	April 25, 2009	—N/a	—N/a	14	1	12
Lauren Pritchard	September 13, 2008	April 25, 2009	—N/a	—N/a	14	1	11
