= Mad TV season 8 =

Season of television series

Mad TV
- Season 8
- The Best of MadTV Seasons 8, 9 & 10 DVD cover, which partially features this season
- No. of episodes: 25

Release
- Original network: Fox
- Original release: September 14, 2002 – May 17, 2003

Season chronology
- ← Previous; Season 7 Next → Season 9

The eighth season of Mad TV, an American sketch comedy series, originally aired in the United States on the Fox Network between September 14, 2002, and May 17, 2003.

== Summary ==
With fan-favorite cast members Alex Borstein, Will Sasso, and Andrew Daly gone, MADtv scrambled to find new talent to fill the void. Jill-Michele Meleán and Bobby Lee were upgraded to repertory status (though Meleán left in the middle of the season for undisclosed reasons) while previous season's featured performers Kathryn Fiore and Taran Killam were let go. New faces in the cast for this season include: Ike Barinholtz, Simon Helberg (before he became more well-known for The Big Bang Theory), Josh Meyers (younger brother of SNL cast member, Seth Meyers, making this the only time a Saturday Night Live cast member has had a family member be hired as a cast member on a competing sketch show), Christina Moore, Ron Pederson (who would become the show's third Canadian cast member after Will Sasso and Tim Conlon, and the only one to be from an indigenous Canadian tribe), and Paul Vogt (MADtv's only male homosexual cast member and the second cast member after season six's Nelson Ascencio to have an identical twin brother who frequently appeared on the show as an extra).

With Sasso gone, Frank Caliendo became the latest cast member to play George W. Bush. Newcomer Ron Pederson played Dick Clark, Woody Allen, Saddam Hussein, and Entertainment Tonight anchor Mark Steines. Vogt replaced Will Sasso as James Lipton and impersonated classic sitcom stars, such as Edward Asner (The Mary Tyler Moore Show), Jackie Gleason (The Honeymooners), and Charlotte Rae (Diff'rent Strokes and The Facts of Life). Like their counterparts Jimmy Fallon and Horatio Sanz on Saturday Night Live, long-time pals Ike Barinholtz and Josh Meyers would frequently appear in sketches together and play off each other's chemistry. Separately, Barinholtz performed celebrity impersonations such as Joe Millionaire's Evan Marriott, Nick Nolte, and Mark Walberg. At the same time, Meyers offered offbeat impersonations of Eminem, Matthew McConaughey, Owen Wilson, Johnny Depp as Captain Jack Sparrow, Anna Nicole Smith's son, Daniel, and some *NSYNC members. In her short time on the show, Jill-Michele Meleán was known for her Drew Barrymore impression and her recurring turn as one of the Glamazon Huntresses.

This would be the last season for longtime original cast member Debra Wilson, who would leave the show after 8 years following the season finale; making her the show's longest-serving original cast member.

Guests this season included: former In Living Color cast members Tommy Davidson and David Alan Grier; former Saturday Night Live cast member, Jay Mohr; former Monty Python cast member Eric Idle; comic actor Fred Willard, That '70s Show cast members Mila Kunis, Danny Masterson, and Wilmer Valderrama; and former MADtv cast member, Nicole Sullivan.

== Opening montage ==
The title sequence begins with the Mad TV logo appearing above the Los Angeles skyline. The theme song, performed by the hip-hop group Heavy D & the Boyz, begins and each repertory cast member is introduced alphabetically, followed by the featured cast. The screen dissolves into three live-action clips of an individual cast member. The three screens multiply until they occupy the entire screen. A shot of the cast member slightly moving appears on the screen with a caption of his/her name superimposed on it. When all cast members and guests are introduced, the music stops and the title sequence ends with the phrase "You are now watching Mad TV".

== Cast ==
Repertory cast members

- Frank Caliendo (23/25 episodes)
- Mo Collins (24/25 episodes)
- Bobby Lee (20/25 episodes)
- Michael McDonald (25/25 episodes)
- Jill-Michele Meleán (8/25 episodes; last episode: April 5, 2003)
- Aries Spears (22/25 episodes)
- Stephnie Weir (25/25 episodes)
- Debra Wilson (25/25 episodes)

Featured cast members

- Ike Barinholtz (20/25 episodes)
- Simon Helberg (6/25 episodes; first episode: November 16, 2002/ last episode: February 22, 2003)
- Josh Meyers (23/25 episodes)
- Christina Moore (9/25 episodes; first episode: February 1, 2003/ last episode: May 10, 2003)
- Ron Pederson (16/25 episodes; first episode: November 2, 2002)
- Paul Vogt (12/25 episodes; first episode: December 21, 2002)

== Writers ==
- Bryan Adams (eps. 1–25)
- Ike Barinholtz (eps. 3, 17)
- Dick Blasucci (eps. 1–25)
- Kal Clarke (eps. 1–25)
- Chris Cluess (eps. 1–25)
- Steven Cragg (eps. 1–25)
- John Crane (eps. 1–25)
- Lauren Dombrowski (eps. 1–25)
- Brian Hartt (ep. 20) (Season 05 Encore)
- Michael Hitchcock (eps. 1–25)
- Jennifer Joyce (eps. 1–25)
- Bill Kelley (eps. 1–25)
- Scott King (writing supervisor) (eps. 1–25)
- Karen Maruyama (ep. 8)
- Bruce McCoy (eps. 1–25)
- Michael McDonald (eps. 2, 3, 5, 7–9, 14–16, 19–25)
- Josh Meyers (eps. 3, 17)
- Sultan Pepper (eps. 1–25)
- Tami Sagher (eps. 1–25)
- David Salzman (eps. 12–25)
- Devon Shepard (ep. 23) (Season 06 Encore)
- Dino Stamatopoulos (eps. 1–25)
- Rich Talarico (eps. 1–25)
- Bryan Tucker (ep. 24) (Season 07 Encore)
- Stephnie Weir (eps. 2, 8, 9, 15–17, 19, 22)
- Maiya Williams (eps. 1–25)
- Jim Wise (eps. 1–25)

== Episodes ==
| No. overall | No. in season | Title | Guest(s) | Original release date |
|---|---|---|---|---|
| 172 | 1 | "Episode 1" | Paula Abdul, Randy Jackson, Kelly Clarkson, Ryan Seacrest, Brian Dunkleman | September 14, 2002 |
"Without Me" parody has Eminem (Meyers) rapping about the lackluster fall TV line-up; Daniel Smith (Meyers) and Howard K. Stern (McDonald) put up with Anna Nicole Smith (Weir) on an episode of her reality show; in a new XXX sequel, Vin Diesel (Barinholtz) repairs cars for the AAA; Jenny Jones (Collins) interviews a white trash mother (Weir) who accuses her infant son of being a slacker; Paula Abdul and Randy Jackson appear in an all-star American Idol sketch; Kelly Clarkson is interviewed by Ted Koppel (Caliendo), then performs a duet with Whitney Houston (Wilson); as part of his community service, Allen Iverson (Spears) runs a camp for underprivileged kids; a doctor's (Meyers) attempt to remove his patient's (Barinholtz) infected toenail turns violent and disgusting. Featuring: Ike Barinholtz, Josh Meyers Note: Ike Barintholtz and Josh Meyers' first episode as featured cast members.
| 173 | 2 | "Episode 2" | Jay Mohr | September 21, 2002 |
The Koppel family (Caliendo, Collins, Weir) star in their own Osbournes style reality show; Angela (Weir) records a documentary about racism; an educational short film shows how different Americans reacted to war back then compared to now; Jay Mohr stars as Chris Penn in a parody of buddy action comedies; policemen (Barinholtz, Caliendo) chase gay criminals (Lee, McDonald, Meyers, Spears) in new police reality show World's Queeniest Criminals; Catherine Zeta-Jones (Collins) fears she's selling out her A-list celebrity image; Dr. Kylie Johnson (Weir) prepares to deliver a baby; Bill O'Reilly (McDonald) interviews Condoleezza Rice (Wilson); Oprah Winfrey (Wilson) turns into a vampire after an audience member (Weir) objected her ways on saving the economy; Martha Stewart's (Collins) prison sentence is turned into a new season of HBO's Oz. Featuring: Ike Barinholtz, Josh Meyers
| 174 | 3 | "Episode 3" | Jackie Chan | September 28, 2002 |
Parody of Nelly's "Hot in Herre" has priests (McDonald, Meyers, Barinholtz, Lee) lusting after little boys at a Christian camp; Jackie Chan stars in his own reality show a la The Anna Nicole Show with Chris Tucker (Wilson) and Owen Wilson (Meyers); Stuart Larkin (McDonald) receives piano lessons; Public Schoolhouse Rock shows us the secret behind public school lunches; Michael McDonald and Debra Wilson interview celebrities at the 2002 Emmys; four friends (Collins, McDonald, Spears, Wilson) go to a 1950s diner that takes historical authenticity a bit too far when the staff (Barinholtz, Meyers, Weir) openly discriminates against black patrons; the Glamazon Huntresses (Collins, Meleán, Weir, Wilson) must face off against acid rain; a jock named Steve Wellington (Barinholtz) makes friends with a nerd named Albert (Meyers) while in detention; Al Pacino (Caliendo) and Robin Williams (Caliendo) discuss their experience filming Insomnia. Featuring: Ike Barinholtz, Josh Meyers
| 175 | 4 | "Episode 4" | Tony Hawk, WC, Xzibit | November 2, 2002 |
A parody of "Gangsta Lovin'" shows the downside of having a thug lover; a woman (Weir) goes over her wedding story with her husband; an urban parody of the Peanuts specials called Chocolate-Covered Peanuts; an angry coach (Barinholtz) yells at his basketball team (Caliendo, Lee, Meyers, McDonald, Spears) for doing poorly, only to learn a horrible secret behind his team's lack of talent; two similar-sounding senators (McDonald, Pederson) have a heated debate; Anna Nicole Smith (Weir) meets Tony Hawk; WC and Xzibit are guests on Real Mother****ing Talk; a religious superhero known as Bible Dude (McDonald) stops some teenagers (Collins, Lee, Pederson) from drinking at a party. Xzibit performs "Multiply". Featuring: Ike Barinholtz, Josh Meyers, Ron Pederson Note: Ron Pederson's first episode as a featured cast member.
| 176 | 5 | "Episode 5" | Bryan Cranston, Ja Rule, Shaggy | November 9, 2002 |
Ozzy (McDonald) and Sharon Osbourne (Collins) have a run in with Anna Nicole Smith (Weir) and Jay Leno (Caliendo) while filming their reality show; Bryan Cranston plays a guy whose wife (Weir) hires a lesbian (Collins) to join them in a threesome; John Madden (Caliendo) struggles with a popcorn maker that he is promoting; during a press conference about an upcoming civil case, Leona Campbell (Weir) wonders if the defendant (Caliendo) of a class-action suit against a fast food restaurant was aware of what he was eating; Wayne Brady (Spears) interviews Ja Rule on The Wayne Brady Show; commercial parody for Walmart; John Edward (McDonald) tries to speak to the dead relatives of his audience (Barinholtz, Caliendo, Meyers, Weir); Shakira (Collins) sings about her incoherent speech; Earl Scheib (Barinholtz) offers his services to fix up squad cars that have been dented due to police brutality; Bobby Lee gives hugs to everyone who leaves the studio. Shaggy performs "Strength of a Woman". Featuring: Ike Barinholtz, Josh Meyers Absent: Ron Pederson
| 177 | 6 | "Episode 6" | David Alan Grier, Jim Rome, The Strokes | November 16, 2002 |
A parody of Eminem's "Cleanin' Out My Closet" has George W. Bush (Caliendo) running scared from his mom, Barbara (Collins), and Barbara rapping about having an incompetent son; Lorraine Swanson (Collins) checks out a college for her son; Dr. Phil (McDonald) insults his female guests (Caliendo, Collins, Weir), including a disguised Oprah Winfrey (Wilson); the remaining members of NSYNC (Barinholtz, Caliendo, Meyers) unveil their new music video; office workers (Pederson, Lee, Weir, Wilson) are curious to a growth spurt of one of their fellow employees (Caliendo); David Alan Grier plays 60 Minutes reporter Ed Bradley, who assaults and insults Eminem (Meyers) and Andy Rooney (Caliendo); a group of friends (Barinholtz, Caliendo, Collins, Weir) are annoyed by a group of singing waiters (Helberg, Meyers, Pederson, Wilson) at Fuddermuckers; on a special Spears on Sports episode, Jim Rome interviews Shaq (Spears), Evander Holyfield (Spears) talks nonsense, and John Madden (Caliendo) talks about what he had for breakfast; the Bushes (Caliendo, Collins) watch the show from the White House. The Strokes perform "Is This It?" and "New York City Cops". Featuring: Ike Barinholtz, Simon Helberg, Josh Meyers, Ron Pederson Absent: Jill-Michele Meleán Note: Simon Helberg's first episode as a featured cast member.
| 178 | 7 | "Episode 7" | Mila Kunis, Danny Masterson, Jack Osbourne, Kelly Osbourne, Wilmer Valderrama | November 23, 2002 |
Marvin Tikvah (McDonald) trashes Mad TV after finding out his son (Barinholtz) loves the show; Jack Osbourne sings "Danny Boy"; McDonald's promotes its newest menu item; a promo for Indiana University highlights the school's wild partying image; Danny Masterson and Wilmer Valderrama return for another CHiPs parody with Mila Kunis; Jack and Kelly Osbourne appear in an episode of 7th Heaven; Mo Collins and Debra Wilson interview celebrities at the premiere for Die Another Day; Stuart Larkin (McDonald) has a chaotic day at the park; animal owners (Collins, McDonald, Weir) insult each other in the waiting room of a veterinarian's office. Kelly Osbourne performs "Shut Up". Featuring: Ike Barinholtz, Simon Helberg, Josh Meyers, Ron Pederson Absent: Jill-Michele Meleán
| 179 | 8 | "Episode 8" | Sum 41 | December 7, 2002 |
On The Price is Right, all the products have sexually suggestive names; a more realistic parody of The Bachelor; Tovah (Wilson) and Belma (Spears) host a special episode of Reality Check aboard an airplane; a talk show host (Pederson) looks back at his recently cancelled show; an HBO First Look for a remake of Snow White and the Seven Dwarfs with miscast voice actors (Barinholtz, Caliendo, Collins, Meleán, Meyers, Spears); commercial parody for a salon specializing in lesbian hairdos; Cloret (Wilson) doesn't do so well at the juice bar; a game show parody where geeky contestants (Sum 41, Wilson) lose to dim-witted public school students (Collins, Lee, McDonald, Meyers, Spears) thanks to social promotion; average Asian Hideki (Lee) is assumed he's the best at math and playing musical instruments because of his heritage; Rev. Jesse Jackson (Spears) and Rosa Parks (Wilson) discuss the controversy of their actions mentioned in the movie Barbershop. Sum 41 performs "Still Waiting". Featuring: Ike Barinholtz, Josh Meyers, Ron Pederson Absent: Simon Helberg
| 180 | 9 | "Episode 9" | Puddle of Mudd | December 14, 2002 |
Justin Timberlake (Meyers) is revealed to be a copycat of Michael Jackson in his newest video; the Lord of the Bling saga continues; Sears's portrait studio has new themed portrait creations for children; Trina (Collins) interviews for a job at IHOP; the Kappa Kappa Kappa sisters (Collins, Meleán, Weir, Wilson) invite a college student (Lee) to be a member for a day; on The O'Reilly Factor, a scroll goes by criticizing the wave of liberal celebrities speaking out against the Bush administration while Bill O'Reilly (McDonald) insults Janeane Garofalo (Caliendo); Bunifa (Wilson) auditions to be a Lakers cheerleader; on a religious talk show, Dot (Weir) claims that she saw Jesus Christ in her school photo; Ike Barinholtz hits on some women after the show. Puddle of Mudd performs "She Hates Me". Featuring: Ike Barinholtz, Simon Helberg, Josh Meyers, Ron Pederson
| 181 | 10 | "Episode 10" | Bon Jovi | December 21, 2002 |
The Epstein Brothers (Helberg, Vogt) sell Christmas tree patches; Diane Sawyer (Collins) discusses the holidays with Whitney Houston (Wilson) and Bobby Brown (Spears); an animated parody of How the Grinch Stole Christmas has Winona Ryder (voice of Wilson) as the Grinch; a perky elf (Weir) frustrates her fellow co-worker (Vogt); Santa Claus (McDonald) threatens to kill a young girl (Weir) and makes the audience forget that Saturday Night Live exists; Lorraine Swanson (Collins) goes Christmas shopping; Matthew the Bible Dude (McDonald) has to deal with a kid (Caliendo) who didn't get his favorite shirt; an office worker (Vogt) plots to bring the holiday spirit to an overly politically-correct office. Bon Jovi performs "Bounce". Featuring: Simon Helberg, Paul Vogt Absent: Ike Barinholtz, Bobby Lee, Jill-Michele Meleán, Josh Meyers, Ron Pederson Note: Paul Vogt's first episode as a featured cast member.
| 182 | 11 | "Episode 11" | Tommy Davidson, Queens of the Stone Age | January 18, 2003 |
A commercial for Scrabble has Aries Spears as Little Richard, Don King, Evander Holyfield, and Bill Cosby; John Madden (Caliendo), Shaq (Spears), and Madonna (Collins) announce their New Year's resolutions; Oprah (Wilson) gives out free money; Tommy Davidson guest stars as a news correspondent in Real Motherf**king Talk: News Edition; an intervention goes bad when a drunk (McDonald) goes sober without the help of his concerned friends (Collins, Helberg, Pederson, Weir, Wilson); Jenny Jones (Collins) hosts a clip show episode of her talk show that spans back to the dawn of time. Queens of the Stone Age performs "No One Knows" and "Go with the Flow". Featuring: Ike Barinholtz, Simon Helberg, Josh Meyers, Ron Pederson Absent: Paul Vogt
| 183 | 12 | "Episode 12" | Anthony Anderson, Jillian Barberie, Jerry O'Connell | January 25, 2003 |
John Madden (Caliendo) previews the line-up of shows on Fox; a parody of The Love Boat has seasick cast members (Caliendo, Lee, McDonald, Spears, Weir, Wilson, Vogt) puking; Spishak promotes their latest product: a realistic toy oven; a mother (Weir) shows off her adopted Korean baby (Lee) who's actually a farmer who has been abducted from his homeland; Jillian Barberie plays Glamazon Huntress Mikayla in an episode of Glamazon Huntresses; a woman (Weir) faces the consequences of leaving Las Vegas; a rich mother (Weir) demonstrates self-defense on her slacker son (McDonald); Evander Holyfield (Spears) shows off his latest clothing style on QVC; Jerry O'Connell and Anthony Anderson play employees who look to discover a cure for hiccups. Featuring: Ike Barinholtz, Josh Meyers, Ron Pederson, Paul Vogt Absent: Jill-Michele Meleán
| 184 | 13 | "Episode 13" | Jamie Kennedy, St. Lunatics | February 1, 2003 |
A new Hooked on Phonics video game only exacerbates a boy's violent tendencies; The Dating Game has Saddam Hussein (Pederson) and Kim Jong-Il (Lee) as potential suitors; LL Cool J (Spears) raps about his rumored steroid use and career decline; Bunifa (Wilson) switches places with an unlikely man (McDonald) on an episode of Trading Spaces; commercial parody for the video series Girls Gone Wild has boys (Barinholtz, Lee, Meyers, Pederson, Spears) flashing their chests and making out for the cameras; Connie Chung (Lee) interviews Evan Marriott (Barinholtz) and Trista Rehn (Moore); a man (Vogt) gets a colonoscopy from Dr. Kylie Johnson (Weir); the Baldacs (Collins, McDonald) have a dispute with one of their neighbors (Jamie Kennedy). St. Lunatics performs "Air Force Ones". Featuring: Ike Barinholtz, Josh Meyers, Christina Moore, Ron Pederson, Paul Vogt Absent: Simon Helberg, Jill-Michele Meleán Note: Christina Moore's first episode as a featured cast member.
| 185 | 14 | "Episode 14" | TBA | February 8, 2003 |
Fighting Ron (McDonald) testifies against Marvin Tikvah (McDonald) on an episode of The People's Court; Fox promotes new reality shows that involve lying to people; the Kappa Kappa Kappa sisters (Collins, Weir, Wilson) face off against a rival sorority (Caliendo, Spears, Vogt); a Looney Tunes parody featuring Saddam Hussein and George W. Bush; obese men on CBS sitcoms get their own line-up; Belma (Spears) and Tovah (Wilson) give Senator Trent Lott (McDonald) a Reality Check; Spishak promotes a new machine to make excuses for you; Shaq (Spears) hosts his own TV show with sportscaster Marv Albert (Caliendo); Dorothy Lenier (Weir) reports a robbery to the police (Caliendo, Vogt). Featuring: Ike Barinholtz, Josh Meyers, Ron Pederson, Paul Vogt Absent: Simon Helberg, Bobby Lee, Christina Moore, Jill-Michele Meleán
| 186 | 15 | "Episode 15" | Paul Hogan, Evan Marriott | February 15, 2003 |
Christina Aguilera (Moore) abandons her sleazy pop image in a music video parody of "Beautiful"; Mofaz the Depressed Persian Tow Truck Man (McDonald) whines about his ugly wife to a couple (Meyers, Weir); another installment of Chocolate-Covered Peanuts has Chuckie Brown (voice of Spears) trying to have sex on Valentine's Day; a parody of Joe Millionaire has Mad TV recurring female characters Anna Nicole Smith (Weir), Bunifa (Wilson), and Lorraine (Collins); Bill O'Reilly (McDonald) has a debate with himself; Ike Barinholtz and Debra Wilson interview celebrities at the premiere for Daredevil; Connie Chung (Lee) interviews Tom Brokaw (Caliendo) and a stripper-turned-reporter (Collins); Dot (Weir) entertains the elderly (Caliendo, Vogt, Wilson) at a nursing home. Featuring: Ike Barinholtz, Josh Meyers, Christina Moore, Paul Vogt Absent: Simon Helberg, Jill-Michele Meleán, Ron Pederson
| 187 | 16 | "Episode 16" | Andy Dick, Ryan Seacrest, Supergrass | February 22, 2003 |
Michael Jackson (Spears) abuses his children in a parody of Look Who's Talking; Angela (Weir) uses her cousin Natalie (Vogt) as a guinea pig for a video project about middle school bullying; Ryan Seacrest counts down Mad TVs best music video parodies; the Larkins (Collins, McDonald) cause havoc at a Chinese restaurant; Andy Dick returns as Christina Aguilera's demented cousin Daphne Aguilera; a commercial promotes the drug ecstasy as a cure for depression; a suave piano player (Vogt) has a painfully effeminate singing voice. Supergrass performs "Rush Hour Soul". Featuring: Ike Barinholtz, Simon Helberg, Josh Meyers, Christina Moore, Ron Pederson, Paul Vogt Absent: Jill-Michele Meleán Note: Simon Helberg's last episode as a featured cast member.
| 188 | 17 | "Episode 17" | t.A.T.u. | March 8, 2003 |
Kim Jong-Il (Lee) raps about his use of nuclear weapons with P. Diddy (Spears) in a Bump, Bump, Bump parody; detectives Grissom (McDonald) and Willows (Collins) reopen a closed case in a parody of CSI; Angela (Weir) records a love message to her next-door neighbor (McDonald); Doug Heffernan (Vogt) goes from king to queen in a parody of King of Queens; James Brown (Spears) shows commercials and clips from around the world; Saddam Hussein (Pederson) throws a party with other world leaders (Lee, McDonald, Meyers); George W. Bush (Caliendo) and Barbara Bush (Collins) teach exercises; two friends (Barinholtz, Meyers) reunite. t.A.T.u. performs "All the Things She Said". Featuring: Ike Barinholtz, Josh Meyers, Ron Pederson, Paul Vogt Absent: Jill-Michele Meleán, Christina Moore
| 189 | 18 | "Episode 18" | Eric Idle, Trish Stratus | March 15, 2003 |
Belma (Spears) and Tovah (Wilson) give Michael Jackson (Spears) and Deborah Rowe (Caliendo) a reality check; Trish Stratus plays one of the Kappa Kappa Kappa sorority sisters; on The Other Half, Danny Bonaduce (Caliendo) and Dick Clark (Pederson) interview a child psychologist (Collins); two bullies (Barinholtz, Meyers) host a talk show in a high school bathroom; contestants (Lee, Vogt, Weir) literally gun for the chance to win cash and prizes on a game show based on the Grand Theft Auto video games; on Entertainment Tonight, Just Married gets a glowing review and Mary Hart (Collins) quits after tolerating the shallow celebrity news for too long; Eric Idle plays a pianist who sings about sexually deviant animals on The Tonight Show with Jay Leno. Featuring: Ike Barinholtz, Josh Meyers, Christina Moore, Ron Pederson, Paul Vogt Absent: Jill-Michele Meleán
| 190 | 19 | "Episode 19" | Tommy Davidson, Fred Willard | March 22, 2003 |
Connie Chung (Lee) interviews Catherine Zeta-Jones (Collins) and Queen Latifah (Spears) about Chicago; Jack Nicholson (Caliendo) introduces a clip from The Hours where Nicole Kidman's (Collins) nose prosthetic won't stay on; Miramax promotes a movie that has not yet been in the writing process; Leona Campbell (Weir) has a chat with a woman (Moore) preparing to get breast implants; a movie trailer for a generic Hollywood romcom called Just Made in Ten Days; Tommy Davidson and Fred Willard play guests on Real Mother****ing Talk; Rusty Miller (McDonald) pitches his movie to Hollywood; Al Pacino (Caliendo) hosts his version of The Jamie Kennedy Experiment; Woody Allen (Pederson) directs a new teen sex comedy. Featuring: Josh Meyers, Christina Moore, Ron Pederson, Paul Vogt Absent: Ike Barinholtz, Jill-Michele Meleán
| 191 | 20 | "Episode 20" | OK Go | April 5, 2003 |
John Madden (Caliendo) hosts a celebrity version of Man vs. Beast with Reba McEntire (Weir), Little Richard (Spears), and Oprah Winfrey (Wilson); Mariah Carey (Wilson) sings with Whitney Houston (Wilson) in her latest music video; Jenny Jones (Collins) thinks she might have found her long, lost daughter; a woman (Weir) decides to leave her disgusting husband (McDonald); Johnny Woo (Lee) promotes his own liquor store; Ted Koppel (Caliendo) interviews crime syndicate bosses (Collins, McDonald, Vogt) about their thoughts on The Sopranos; Bob Ross (McDonald) broods about his former family; a 21st-century revival of The Mary Tyler Moore Show; a bratty pre-teen (Meleán) fights with her mother (Weir) over prom dresses. OK Go performs "Get Over It". Featuring: Paul Vogt Absent: Ike Barinholtz, Josh Meyers, Christina Moore, Ron Pederson Note: Jill-Michele Meleán's last episode as a cast member.
| 192 | 21 | "Episode 21" | Countess Vaughn, The Folksmen | April 12, 2003 |
Dr. Phil (McDonald) runs into a disguised Oprah (Wilson); Anna Nicole Smith (Weir) ranks the best commercial parodies of Mad TV; Mickey (McDonald) is an eyewitness to a crime and brags about it on the news; psychic Vera Mangus (Weir) makes a return; Christopher Guest, Michael McKean, and Harry Shearer perform as The Folksmen; Happy Folger (McDonald) disgusts a poetry group with his poem about aging; Countess Vaughn has to put up with lazy clerk Cloret (Wilson) at the airport. Featuring: Christina Moore, Paul Vogt Absent: Ike Barinholtz, Mo Collins, Josh Meyers, Ron Pederson, Aries Spears
| 193 | 22 | "Episode 22" | Mandy Moore, Godsmack | April 26, 2003 |
A closeted gay man (Pederson) hopes to use a pill to have an erection with a woman (Collins); one of Oprah's (Wilson) cameras makes her look thin; two commentators (McDonald, Meyers) witness a golfer (Barinholtz) have a meltdown during a golfing tournament; a wedding where the parents (Pederson, Weir) perform some dirty dancing; Rusty Miller (McDonald) interviews Mandy Moore; on Star Dates, two hopefuls (Meyers, Collins) date Charlotte Rae (Vogt) and Nick Nolte (Barinholtz); a 21st-century take on The Honeymooners. Godsmack performs "Straight Out of Line". Featuring: Ike Barinholtz, Josh Meyers, Christina Moore, Ron Pederson, Paul Vogt Absent: Frank Caliendo, Bobby Lee, Aries Spears
| 194 | 23 | "Episode 23" | Missy Elliott | May 3, 2003 |
A commercial for a correspondence school; a homeless man (voice of McDonald) sings about how he became a substitute teacher on Public Schoolhouse Rock; a father (McDonald) and daughter (Weir) fight while preparing for a garage sale; Stuart Larkin (McDonald) has a few reservations about visiting his estranged father; James Lipton's (Vogt) interview with Matthew McConaughey (Meyers) is interrupted by Dorothy Lenier (Weir); a wall-hanging pest (McDonald) annoys his brother (Meyers) and his date (Weir). Missy Elliott performs "Work It". Featuring: Josh Meyers, Paul Vogt Absent: Ike Barinholtz, Frank Caliendo, Bobby Lee, Christina Moore, Aries Spears
| 195 | 24 | "Episode 24" | Tom Arnold | May 10, 2003 |
A mime (Pederson) performs sexually suggestive acts; Mofaz (McDonald) compares his mother-in-law troubles with another traveler (Caliendo); the Seven Buddy Cops (Barinholtz, Caliendo, Lee, Meyers, Spears, Wilson) head out West to fight crime; a religious program extols the virtues of atheism; Patrick (McDonald) intervenes with a man (Barinholtz) trying to get a phone number; on a new Spears on Sports, Marv Albert (Caliendo) interviews Barry Bonds (Spears) and Tom Arnold interviews Oscar De La Hoya (Spears); Michael McDonald and Debra Wilson offer to give a needy family gifts, but the needy family thinks they're on Saturday Night Live; a rookie cop (Pederson) with bad aim shoots his veteran partner (McDonald). Featuring: Ike Barinholtz, Josh Meyers, Christina Moore, Ron Pederson, Paul Vogt Note: Christina Moore's last episode as a featured cast member.
| 196 | 25 | "Episode 25" | Steve-O, Nicole Sullivan, Jason Acuña | May 17, 2003 |
Johnny Woo (Lee) holds his own paralegal for African-Americans; Spishak Cars for Kids can be attached to real cars; Oprah (Wilson) invites the cast of Jackass to prank Stedman (Spears); Nicole Sullivan plays Marvin Tikvah's (McDonald) equally sleazy daughter Mindy; Lorraine (Collins) gets her teeth checked by a dentist (McDonald); a married couple (Barinholtz, Collins) do nothing but fight in front of their daughter (Weir) and her friend (Wilson); Ted Koppel (Caliendo) goes from newscaster to Herbal Essence shampoo spokesperson. Featuring: Ike Barinholtz, Josh Meyers Absent: Ron Pederson, Paul Vogt Note: Debra Wilson's last episode as a cast member.

== Home releases ==
As of 2024, there is no season 8 complete season DVD release. However, this season's best sketches and segments have been used in the compilation DVD Mad TV: The Best of Seasons 8, 9, and 10.

When HBO Max streamed this series, episodes 1, 2, 4, 5, 6, 7, 8, 9, 10, 11, 13, 16, 17, 20, 21, 22, and 23 were omitted, making this the shortest season shown on streaming. This is the same version that was released on Howdy and Tubi.
