= Jill-Michele Meleán =

American actress and stand-up comedian

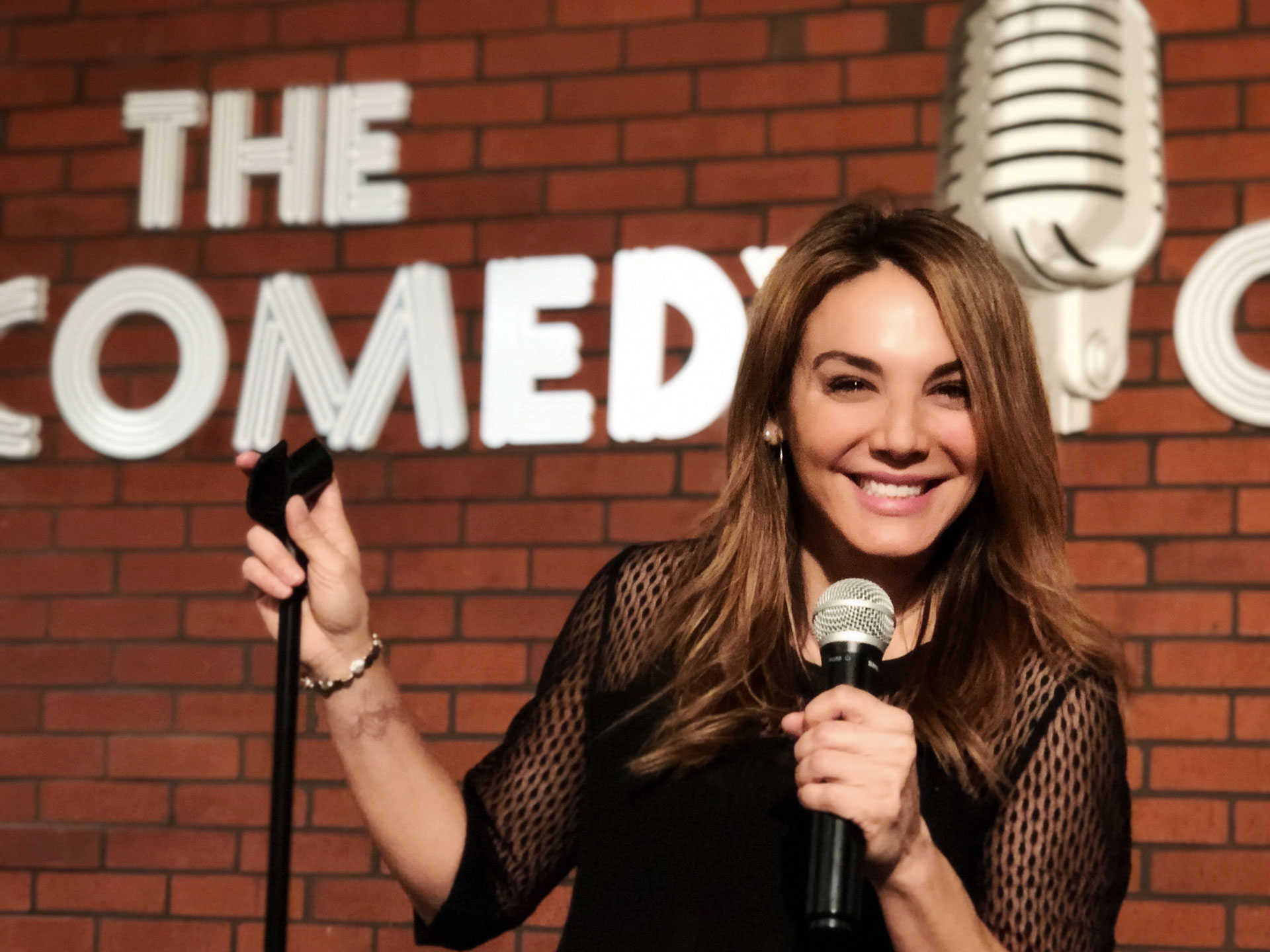
- Meleán performing in 2019
- Born: Miami, Florida, U.S.

Comedy career
- Years active: 1992–present
- Medium: Stand-up, film, television
- Genres: Sketch comedy, improvisational comedy
- Website: www.jillyonline.com

Jill-Michele Meleán is an American actress and stand-up comedian. She was a cast member of the sketch comedy series MADtv from 2002 to 2003.

== Early life ==
Meleán was born and raised in Miami, Florida, the daughter of a Bolivian father and Irish American mother. Meleán was raised Catholic.

== Career ==
Meleán (aka "Jilly") is a national touring headlining comedienne. After meeting Carlos Alazraqui on Reno 911! (she played his sister on the show), they toured together for years as standup comics. They also wrote and produced Witness Infection, a comedy/horror feature film on Amazon Prime.

=== MADtv ===
Meleán joined the cast of MADtv in 2002 as a featured performer in its seventh season, and was hired as a regular in June that year for the eighth season. She was the third Hispanic cast member to join the show (after Cuban-born Nelson Ascencio in 1999 and Chilean-American cast member Pablo Francisco in 1997) and the first Latin female. She impersonated Britney Spears and Drew Barrymore, and replaced Kathryn Fiore's character in the Kappa Kappa Kappa Sorority sisters sketch.

== Filmography ==
=== Film ===
Year	Title	Role	Notes
2002	King Rikki	Clara	
2003	Hunting of Man	Ingrid	
2007	Reno 911!: Miami	Southern Spring Breaker	
2016	Love and Hostages	Jackie Chase	
2016	Popstar: Never Stop Never Stopping	Drunk Aunt	
2017	Swing State	Claire	
2017	Varsity Punks	Rosie's Mom	
2017	In Vino	Kristen	
2017	This Is Meg	Meg	Also writer and producer
2018	Taco Shop	Celia	
2019	Richard Jewell	Horde Reporter	
2020	Witness Infection	Gina	Also writer and producer
2021	The F*** Happened	Mrs. Rodriguez	
2025	For Worse	Justine's Mother	

=== Television ===
Year	Title	Role	Notes
2000	Manhattan, AZ	Miss Vega	2 episodes
2002–2003	Mad TV	Various roles	11 episodes
2003	The Parkers	Jennifer	Episode: "The Mack Is Like Wo!"
2005–2009	Reno 911!	Various roles	4 episodes
2006	Mud Show	Willie	Television film
2007	'Til Death	Hockey Girl	Episode: "The Hockey Lie"
2008	Chocolate News	San Diego Kiosk Girl	Episode #1.7
2010	The Fuzz	Denise Sanders	Television film
2011	Big Time Rush	Sylvia Garcia	Episode: "Big Time Moms"
2011	The Love You Save	Consuela	Television film
2015	All Stars	Mall Mom	Television film
2016	TMI Hollywood	Host / Various	Episode: "Grizzly Thunderpunch"
2018	Laugh at LA	Receptionist	Episode #1.1
2018	Most Likely To	Customer	Television film
