= Brooke Totman =

American actor

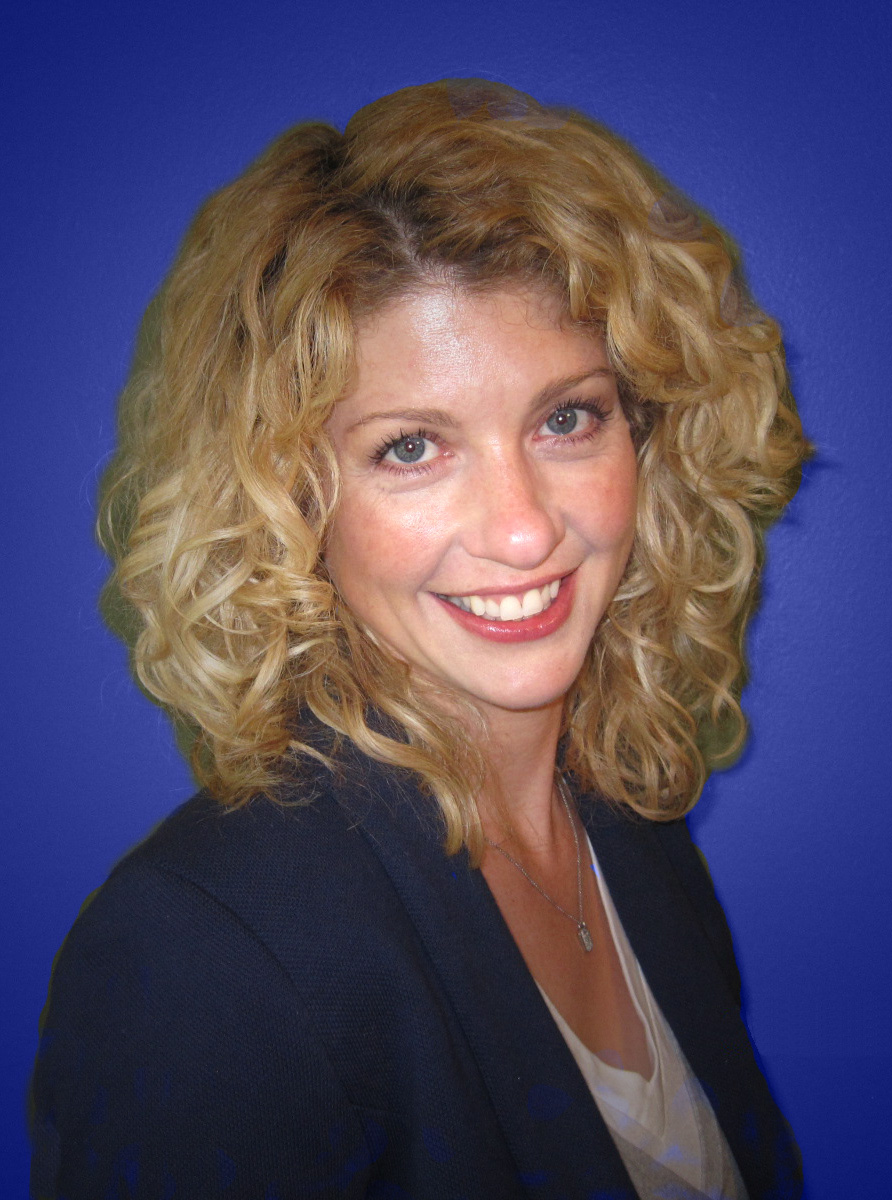
- Occupations: Actress, comedian, writer
- Years active: 1999–present

Brooke Totman is an American actress who is best known for her time as a featured cast member on the television series Mad TV and for starring in the critically acclaimed web-series, The Benefits of Gusbandry.

== Life and career ==
Brooke Totman majored in Theatre Performance at the University of Oregon. She spent her last semester abroad studying Theatre Criticism in London. After college, Totman moved to Los Angeles where she spent four years training at the improv and sketch comedy theatre, the Groundlings, eventually becoming a member of their Sunday company.

During her time in L.A., Totman joined the television series MADtv as a featured cast member. Brooke was noted for her celebrity impressions of Ann-Margret and Jennifer Love Hewitt, and also premiered original characters that she developed during her time at the Groundlings. After her tenure on MADtv, Totman made several guest appearances on The King of Queens, Less Than Perfect, Judging Amy, Life After First Failure, Portlandia, and Documentary Now!. She also starred in the critically acclaimed series The Benefits of Gusbandry on Amazon.

== Television appearances ==
Year	Title	Role	Other notes
1999–2000	MADtv	Cast Member	6 episodes
2002	The King of Queens	Hostess	1 episode
2003	R3	Jill	Feature Film
2003	Less Than Perfect	Joanie Squillante	1 episode
2003	Judging Amy	Mrs. Drake	1 episode
2017	Life After First Failure	Bubbles	1 episode
2017	Portlandia	Connie	1 episode
2016–2018	The Benefits of Gusbandry	Jackie	12 episodes
2019	Documentary Now!	Paula	1 episode
