= Christian Duguay (actor) =

American actor and comedian

- Occupations: Actor; comedian; podcaster
- Years active: 1990s–present
- Spouse(s): Rachel Ramras (divorced) Emily Maya Mills (m. 2019)

Christian Duguay is an American actor and comedian. Duguay is most notable as one of the recurring cast of sketch comedy series MADtv. He currently hosts the Valley Heat podcast.

== Biography ==
=== Early years ===
Christian Duguay was born on January 3, 1970, in Stanford, California. He grew up in Carefree, Arizona, and Readfield, Maine. Duguay attended the Berklee College of Music in Boston, Massachusetts, where he majored in Jazz Theory and Composition. In 1990, Duguay enrolled in the film school at California State University at Northridge, majoring in screenwriting. He performed with the improv comedy group Legitimate Freaks, and later studied at Groundlings Theater. He joined the Groundlings Main Company in 2000.

=== Personal life ===
Christian Duguay is married to Emily Maya Mills. He was formerly married to fellow Groundling Rachel Ramras.

== Career ==
=== MADtv ===
Duguay joined the cast of MADtv in 2000. He soon found popularity for his celebrity impressions which included: Jay Leno and *NSYNC's Joey Fatone, and most notably George W. Bush.

==== Characters ====
Character	Sketch	Season of First Appearance	Catch Phrase	Notes
Edward	Edward	6	"I don't get it!"	He is an extremely hyperactive teenager who finds difficulty in comprehending various tasks.
Loupgarou	Loupgarou & Hulahoop	6		He is a man who was blinded by a chemical fire as a child and now peddles on the street playing music and singing.

Impressions

- Adolf Hitler
- Andy Griffith (as Sheriff Andy Taylor)
- Bob Eubanks
- Colin Quinn
- Dan Rather
- George W. Bush
- Howie Long
- Jay Leno
- Pitbull Patterson
- Jim Backus (as Thurston Howell III)
- John McDaniel
- Joey Fatone
- Martin Sheen
- Robert Zemeckis
- Wolf Blitzer

=== Television projects ===
Aside from MADtv, Duguay has made other television appearances on shows like Arrested Development and Yes, Dear. Duguay also appeared in the HBO special Sketch Pad. As of March 2006, he is still with the Main Company of the Groundlings.

== Filmography ==
Year	Title	Role	Other notes
2007	Krews	Cop	
2020	Valley Heat	Doug Duguay	

=== Television appearances ===
Year	Title	Role	Other notes
1999	Futurama	Various	Animated Sitcom
2000–2001	MADtv	Various Characters	Sketch Comedy
2004	Arrested Development	Man in Bar	Live-Action Sitcom
2017	Mike Tyson Mysteries	Phillip (voice)	1 episode
2018	Nobodies	Kevin Thune	6 episodes
2020	The Dress Up Gang	Christian	8 episodes
2020	Corporate	Daniel	1 episode
