= Jeff Richards (actor, born 1974) =

American actor (born 1974)

- Born: Jeffrey Hanson Richards; October 21, 1974 (age 51); Walnut Creek, California, U.S.
- Education: University of North Carolina, Chapel Hill (BA)
- Occupations: Actor; comedian; impressionist
- Years active: 2000–present

Jeffrey Hanson Richards (born October 21, 1974) is an American actor and stand-up comedian. He was the first person to be a cast member on both FOX's MADtv and its rival sketch show, NBC's Saturday Night Live, appearing on the former in 2000, and the latter from 2001 to 2004. He is perhaps best known for his frequent SNL character "Drunk Girl".

As a standup comedian, Richards has opened for Chris Kattan, Andrew Dice Clay, Rob Schneider, David Spade, Louie Anderson, and Andy Dick. He has appeared as a guest on Marc Maron's WTF podcast, and Kill Tony, as well as on Aqua Teen Hunger Force and NBC's Late Night. In October 2020, Richards launched The Jeff Richards Show, a new podcast - guests have included Alec Baldwin, Bob Saget, Brad Garrett, Tommy Chong and more.

== Early years ==
Richards was born in Walnut Creek, California, and attended Las Lomas High School. At age 17, he created and hosted a public access sketch comedy show called Hanson Live. He later worked for KVHS, a student-run radio station which broadcasts from Clayton Valley High School. He then attended the University of North Carolina at Chapel Hill (UNC) and, in his senior year, he joined the improvisational comedy team CHiPs Improv. Fellow CHiPs member Zach Ward brought Richards to the comedy club Charlie Goodnights in Raleigh, North Carolina, where he performed at an open mic show; Richards would eventually go on to host at the club.

After graduating from UNC, Richards moved to Los Angeles to further develop his comedy career.

== Career ==
After moving to LA, Richards worked the door at The Comedy Store and eventually started to perform stand-up.

In 2000, Richards became a featured player in the cast of MADtv, appearing in 3 episodes of the show's 6th season. The following year Richards joined the cast of Saturday Night Live during its 27th season, making him the first person to be a cast-member of both sketch comedy shows (Taran Killam would later become the only other performer to do so). Richards was promoted to repertory status for SNL's 29th season although he left the show after the 10th episode, which aired on January 17, 2004. In interviews, Richards has stated that he left the show on his own terms.

Perhaps Richards' most popular character on SNL was "Drunk Girl", who appeared on the Weekend Update segment nine times. He based the character on an audience member he encountered while performing stand-up at The Comedy Store in La Jolla, California.

In 2004 Richards appeared in the Comedy Central year-end retrospective special Last Laugh '04 as Fox News commentator Bill O'Reilly. In 2006 he again portrayed O'Reilly in episode of Mind of Mencia titled "Carlos Smoov".

In 2007 he appeared on episode 22 of Comics Unleashed with Byron Allen along with comics Jeff Jena, Natasha Leggero, and Mike Epps.

Richards has also done voice work which includes characters in the 2004 video game EverQuest II, a character in the 2006 MTV animated series Where My Dogs At? and in 2010 he played the voice of Brad Pitt in an episode titled "The Wedding" of the FOX sitcom 'Til Death.

Richards produced a comedic album titled A$$WAX which was released on iTunes on March 3, 2009; a portion of the proceeds from the album's sales was used to fight world hunger. Richard also performed in a series of comedy benefit shows called "Asswax 4 Hunger" in 2009; the shows were hosted by friend Kato Kaelin. Richards and Kaelin also hosted a podcast called In Pod We Trust in 2011.

In 2009 Richards played the character of Jerome Murphy in episode 3 of the ABC science fiction series FlashForward. That same year Richards appeared in the pilot episode of a sitcom created by comedian Bill Burr called The Burr Effect which appeared on Comedy Central; the series did not get picked up by the network.

In an episode of The Big 3 Podcast which was released on June 8, 2012, Jeff Richards made an appearance where he played Dr Tommy Morris, a psychiatrist with a bachelor's degree from The University of Idaho (28:00) This episode became one of the most viewed episodes of the podcast. As reported in Entertainment Weekly, Richards recently launched his own podcast, featuring one of his impressions interviewing celebrity guests. Moviemaker magazine described it as a "very funny, mindbending show where [Richards] uses deepfakes to mimic celebrities interviewing other celebrities".

In 2026, Richards starred, produced and contributed music to the horror comedy Pay to Die, which was Robert Carradine's last movie.

Over his career Richards has also appeared on Late Night with Conan O'Brien, Jimmy Kimmel Live! and The Late Late Show with Craig Kilborn.

== Celebrity impersonations featured on Saturday Night Live ==
- Louie Anderson (whom he also portrayed on MADtv)
- Burt Bacharach
- Lance Bass
- Gary Busey
- Howard Dean
- Fred Durst
- Al Franken
- Josh Gracin
- Dustin Hoffman
- Curly Howard
- Steve Irwin
- David Letterman (whom he also portrayed on MADtv)
- Rush Limbaugh
- Michael Moore
- Bill O'Reilly (whom he also portrayed in an episode of Mind of Mencia)
- Dr. Phil
- Charlie Rose
- Pete Rose
- Karl Rove
- Garry Shandling (whom he also portrayed on MADtv)
- Siegfried from Siegfried and Roy
- Kevin Spacey
- Gene Wilder

== Filmography ==
- The Hand Job (2005)
- Projectorhead (short film) (2006)
- Sheep Man (short film) (2006)
- Bad Mofos (short film) (2011)
- Desert Fiends (2024)
- Pay to Die (2026)
