= Pat Kilbane =

American actor

- Born: Patrick F. Kilbane; Lakewood, Ohio, U.S.
- Occupations: Actor; comedian; screenwriter
- Years active: 1996–present

Patrick F. Kilbane is an American actor, comedian, and screenwriter best known for his three seasons as a cast member on MADtv (1997–2000), as well his memorable appearance in the 1996 "The Bizarro Jerry" episode of Seinfeld. Kilbane's first book, The Brain Eater's Bible: Sound Advice for the Newly Reanimated Zombie, was released on March 18, 2011.

== Life and career ==
Kilbane was born in Lakewood, Ohio, and attended Beloit College, graduating in 1990. He majored in French and he began work as a stand-up comedian. Kilbane is an alumnus of the Sigma Chi fraternity. After graduation, he toured the Midwest for four years, spending over 40 weeks a year on the road. Kilbane would later move to Los Angeles, where he would act in commercials for Budweiser (fighting an "evil" refrigerator), The Single Guy, and HBO's Arli$$.

After spending 3 seasons as a cast member on MADtv, Kilbane appeared with small and supporting roles in films such as Monkeybone, Evolution, and Meet Dave. In 2003, Kilbane was considered for his own sketch comedy show on Comedy Central called The Pat Kilbane Show. A pilot episode was filmed and produced. However, Comedy Central ended up passing on greenlighting the pilot to the series. In late 2004, Kilbane opened Wexford Hill Hobbies on Stroop Road in Kettering, Ohio. The store specialized in gaming hobbies including role-playing, tabletop, and miniature games. In 2007, he sold the store and it was renamed KrystalKeep by new owners. Kilbane currently resides in Woodland Hills, California. In 2008, Kilbane reprised his Howard Stern impersonation on an episode of Frank TV.

More recently, Kilbane spent several years working with DreamWorks helping developing science fiction concepts for television. He also wrote the humorous sci-fi/horror book, "Brain Eaters Bible: Sound Advice for the Newly Reanimated Zombie", which was released on March 18, 2011. In 2012, a "Brain Eaters Bible" app for the iPad was released.

In April 2012, Kilbane moderated a web series for SOFREP.com titled "Inside The Team Room". This web series featured three United States Navy Seals, including the now-deceased Chris Kyle.

== MADtv ==
Kilbane joined the cast of MADtv in 1997 as a featured performer, for the third season. However, when David Herman left the show mid-season, Kilbane was later promoted to a repertory performer status. Kilbane was known for many popular characters, such as the frequently appearing Stan McNer, a coffee addict with bulging eyes. Others include Nick Bendix, actor of Rocket Revengers, the Sheriff's deputy (The Son of Dolemite). He also became the second cast member to portray the Spishak salesman (David Herman was the first).

Kilbane impressed with numerous impersonations, which included Al Gore, Howard Stern, Luke Perry, Marilyn Manson, Sean Connery, Mel Gibson (as Martin Riggs from Lethal Weapon), Arnold Schwarzenegger, Jay Leno, Jack Nicholson, Desi Arnaz (as Ricky Ricardo from I Love Lucy), Michael Richards (as Cosmo Kramer from Seinfeld), Bob Saget, Donald Trump, Tom Bergeron, Ted Koppel, Robin Williams, Antonio Banderas, Leonard Nimoy (as Mr. Spock), Rob Zombie, Charlton Heston, Andy Griffith, Tommy Tune, Michael Imperioli (as Christopher Moltisanti from The Sopranos), Billy Bob Thornton (as Karl Chiders from Sling Blade), Stone Phillips, Michael Eisner, Brad Pitt, Don Knotts (as Ralph Furley from Three's Company), Keith Richards, and Ray Bolger (as the Scarecrow from The Wizard of Oz).

Despite being a cast member on MADtv, Kilbane did not limit himself and often did side projects. While on a summer hiatus from MADtv, he co-starred in the Universal film New Jersey Turnpikes with Kelsey Grammer and former MADtv castmember Orlando Jones. After three years on the show, Kilbane left MADtv at the end of season five.

=== Characters ===
Character	Sketch	Season of first appearance	Notes
Andy Kessler	Various	4	
Nick Bendix/Captain Dutch Anderson	Rocket Revengers	4	
Schtein	Hoppy Potty	5	
Sheriff's Deputy	Son of Dolemite	4	
Spishak Spokesman	Spishak Products	3	
Stan McNer	Stan the Java Man	3	
Taylor Jason Bernard Henry Brown Jacobson/Nolan	Pretty White Kids with Problems	5	

== Filmography ==
Year	Title	Role	Other notes
2019	Wonder Park	Chimpanzombie	
2008	Meet Dave	Number 4	
2008	Semi-Pro	Petrelli	
2008	Day of the Dead	Scientist	
2006	Pucked	Elvis	
2004	EuroTrip	American Robot Guy	
2001	Evolution	Officer Sam Johnson	
2001	Monkeybone	Burger God Representative	
1999	New Jersey Turnpikes	Uncredited	

== Television ==
Year	Title	Role	Other notes
2008	Frank TV	Howard Stern	
2007	My Name Is Earl	Lance "Bagger Lance" Parker	Ep: "Girl Earl"
1997–2000	MADtv	Various Characters	
1997	Arli$$	Damian Niles	
1996	Seinfeld	Feldman	

== Web ==
Year	Title	Role	Other notes
2015	Game Sack	Humor Coach	Ep: "Games We've Always Wanted to Talk About"
2022	Game Sack	co-host	Ep: "Dungeons & Dragons Games"

Preceded by: David Herman; 1995–1997	MADtv's Spishak; Spokesman; 1997–2000	Succeeded by: Josh Meyers; 2002–2004
