= Back From the Shadows: The Firesign Theatre's 25th Anniversary Reunion Tour =

United States, live tour

Back From the Shadows: The Firesign Theatre's 25th Anniversary Reunion Show
- Reunion tour by The Firesign Theatre
- Associated album: Back From the Shadows
- Start date: April 24, 1993
- Legs: 20

Back From the Shadows: The Firesign Theatre's 25th Anniversary Reunion Tour

Live album by The Firesign Theatre
- Released: 1994
- Recorded: April–October 1993
- Venue: Keswick Theatre, Philadelphia PA; Warner Theatre, Washington DC; Berkeley Community Theatre, Berkeley CA
- Genre: Comedy
- Length: 97:43
- Label: Mobile Fidelity Sound Lab
- Producer: Richard Fish

The Firesign Theatre chronology
Shoes for Industry: The Best of the Firesign Theatre (1993)	Back From the Shadows: The Firesign Theatre's 25th Anniversary Reunion Tour (1994)	Pink Hotel Burns Down (1996)

Back From the Shadows was the twenty-fifth anniversary reunion tour of the comedy group the Firesign Theatre, performed at twenty cities across the United States in 1993. A live video CD recording of three performances was released as the group's nineteenth album in 1994 by Mobile Fidelity Sound Lab.

The performance material was loosely adapted and updated from four albums originally issued by Columbia Records: Waiting for the Electrician or Someone Like Him (1968); How Can You Be in Two Places at Once When You're Not Anywhere at All (1969); Don't Crush That Dwarf, Hand Me the Pliers (1970); and I Think We're All Bozos on This Bus (1971). The concert's title comes from lyrics "Back From the Shadows Again" that the group wrote as a parody of Gene Autry's signature song "Back in the Saddle Again" for I Think We're All Bozos on This Bus. The final scene, "Toad Away", is a parody hymn the group wrote to the tune of The First Noel in 1970 for their Dear Friends radio program, which appeared on the 1972 album of the same name.

== Performance venues ==
The reunion concert opened in Seattle, Washington on April 24, 1993. The audience numbered 2,900 and included comic actor Harry Anderson. The tour continued through October, at US cities and venues including:

- Holbrook, Arizona ( Austin, Back From the Shadows liner notes)
- Denver, Colorado Auditorium Theatre
- Omaha, Nebraska
- Chicago, Illinois -- McCormick Place
- Erie, Pennsylvania
- Bennington, Vermont
- Rockland, Maine
- Springfield, Massachusetts -- University of Massachusetts Amherst
- Boston, Massachusetts -- Orpheum
- New York City -- Beacon Theatre
- Philadelphia, Pennsylvania -- Keswick Theatre
- Washington DC -- Warner Theatre
- New York City -- Paramount Theatre
- Somerset, Pennsylvania
- Galesburg, Illinois
- North Platte, Nebraska
- Salt Lake City, Utah
- Reno, Nevada
- Tiburon, California
- Los Angeles, California -- Wiltern Theatre

== Track listing ==
All tracks are written by the Firesign Theatre.

Still Waiting For the Electrician (or Someone Like Him)
No.	Title	Length
1.	"At The Border"	4:49
2.	"Beat The Reaper!"	3:22

Nick Danger in "Cut 'Em Off At the Past!"
No.	Title	Length
3.	"He Walks Again By Night"	10:47
4.	"The Old Same Place"	6:09
5.	"Hold It Right There!"	3:02

How Can You Be In Two Places At Once (When You're Not Anywhere At All)
No.	Title	Length
6.	"Ralph Spoilsport Motors"	3:44
7.	"On The Antelope Freeway"	3:17
8.	"The American Pageant"	9:19
9.	"Bringing The War Back Home"	5:33

I Think We're All Bozos (On This Bus)
No.	Title	Length
10.	"On the Funway"	6:40
11.	"The Breaking of the President"	3:13
12.	"Doctor Memory"	5:15

Don't Crush That Dwarf (Hand Me the Pliers)
No.	Title	Length
13.	"Tirebiter Wakes Up Hungry"	5:17
14.	"Pastor Flash"	5:23
15.	"High School Madness"	8:32
16.	"Parallel Hell"	4:05
17.	"The Court-Martial Scene"	2:25
18.	"George Gets a Wakeup Call"	2:15
19.	"Toad Away"	4:36
