= Not Insane or Anything You Want To =

Live album by the Firesign Theatre
- Released: October 1972
- Venue: Columbia University
- Genre: Comedy
- Length: 43:24
- Label: Columbia
- Producer: Stephen Gillmor

The Firesign Theatre chronology
Dear Friends (1972)	Not Insane or Anything You Want To (1972)	How Time Flys (1973)

Not Insane or Anything You Want To is the sixth album released by the Firesign Theatre on Columbia Records. It was released in October 1972 and includes some material that was recorded in the studio as well as some material that was recorded before a live audience. The full title is listed on the spine of the record album as Not Insane or Anything You Want To. The abbreviated title Not Insane appears on the front of the album cover, while Or Anything You Want To appears on the back cover. It is usually referred to simply as Not Insane.

The album was mixed from parts of a live performance recorded during the Martian Space Party radio broadcast and film, a 1970 live performance of a Shakespeare parody The Count of Monte Cristo, and newly recorded studio material.

The album was a commercial and critical failure, and the group years later would call it "a serious mistake". They immediately went on hiatus for a year, with Proctor and Bergman recording as a duo while Phil Austin and David Ossman worked on solo albums.

== Background ==
In 1996, David Ossman published his diary entries from January through June 1972 when the Firesign Theatre prepared for their 1972 Columbia Records album, the closeout of their radio show Let's Eat!, and a Firesign short film pitched to them by Columbia producer Steve Gillmor.

In 1970, the group performed a Shakespeare parody at Columbia University, The Count of Monte Cristo. For their 1972 album, they decided to write two new scenes (known as "the shipboard scene" and the "Father's Ghost on the battlements" scene) February 9–15 to expand this and call it Anything You Want To.

By March 8, they had decided on the title Martian Space Party for the radio show's final episode, which would be filmed for Gillmor's movie and recorded for use in the next record album.

On March 9, 1972, Columbia signed the group to a second five-year recording contract.

On March 30, the Martian Space Party was performed before an audience, broadcast live on KPFK FM, filmed in 35mm, and recorded on 16-track tape by CBS engineers outside in a mobile bus. On April 16, the Firesigns assembled a miniature set on Phil Austin's porch and filmed insert shots of the monster Glutamoto attacking Monster Island. Final editing was finished by May 4. The movie was screened on June 29 at the Directors Guild of America theatre in Hollywood.

== Production ==
The Firesigns started writing the 1972 album, now to be called Not Insane, on May 1. On May 9, they wrote the first drafts of "Torment of Young Guy in Radio Prison" and "Mark Time's return from Planet X"; and also conceived WALTER, the Watching-And-Listening-To-Everything Robot, to tie things together. On May 15 they recorded an 8-track tape sound collage, "all created from recycled ads, readings of Filipino comic books, gospel music, coverage of the Olympics in Tierra del Fuego and other bits from the "Let's Eat" radio shows", which became the "Radio Prison", random radio and TV transmissions trapped in the space around Earth. The Young Guy torment scene was used in the final product, but the Mark Time material was not. WALTER's voice was used, though the meaning was not explained.

On May 31, the Firesigns decided to "discard portions of work already written and recorded", including the Mark Time material. They had another photo shoot June 1 at Austin's home for the album cover art, using the Monster Island miniatures used for the Martian Space Party. On June 2, they wrote two pages for a new Young Guy scene, which they also discarded. Gillmor arrived on this date for a meeting, which according to Ossman "end[ed] abruptly and TFT goes home" without explanation. On June 10, Ossman says "TFT decides on no further meetings at this time. Phone calls continue throughout June."

The album was mixed from the Martian Space Party soundtrack, the 1970 Count of Monte Cristo recording, and the newly recorded studio material, and released in October. "The contemplated story line and newly-written but un-recorded scenes were never used."

== Critical reception ==
Professional ratings
Review scores
Source	Rating
AllMusic	2/5 stars
The New Rolling Stone Record Guide	1/5 stars

The New Rolling Stone Record Guide only gives the album one star (out of a possible five), while The Goldmine Comedy Record Price Guide only gives it one and a half stars.

In the notes to the group's 1993 greatest hits album, Shoes for Industry: The Best of the Firesign Theatre, Peter Bergman criticized the album, saying Not Insane "was when the Firesign was splitting apart; it was a fractious, fragmented album." David Ossman says that the album “was incomprehensible, basically” and that “it was not the album it should have been and I think that caused us to slope off rapidly in sales."

== Legacy ==
The poor reception and financial performance of Not Insane caused the Firesigns to rethink their method of working which they had evolved. Proctor and Bergman decided to split off and write their own 1973 album, TV or Not TV. Ossman used his Mark Time / return from Planet X material cut from Not Insane to base his own 1973 album How Time Flys, and Austin wrote his own album, Roller Maidens From Outer Space. All four Firesigns acted in these last two albums, and the group reunited to write and perform in 1974.

The Firesigns expanded the Shakespeare parody again in 1981 into a road show, released on the 1982 vinyl LP Shakespeare's Lost Comedie, and re-released on CD in 2001 as Anythynge You Want To.

John Lennon had been photographed wearing a "Not Insane!" button supporting Papoon for President during April 1973, including at his "Nutopia" press conference. Proctor and Bergman gave interviews discussing the "Papoon candidacy" to Steve Marshal of KNX radio, Los Angeles, both before and after the 1972 presidential election. The Firesigns revived Papoon's "campaign" in the 1976 and 1980 presidential elections, and released the compilation album Papoon for President in 2002.

In November 2020, the two surviving Firesigns, Philip Proctor and David Ossman, released a real album with the title of a fictional album mentioned in Not Insane, Dope Humor of the Seventies. This is a compilation of 34 tracks taken from their Dear Friends radio program which were previously released on the 2010 album Duke of Madness Motors.

== Program material ==
=== Side one: "Not Insane" (19:58) ===
The album begins with two and a half minutes of studio chatter before a live performance, in which the background noise of the venue's air conditioning system is discussed. Over this is layered the lilting vocalization of Annalee Austin or Tiny Ossman (wives of Phil and David, who performed with the group in The Martian Space Party). This segues into a commercial by Dexter Fogg (Austin) for a fictional album called Dope Humor of the '70s.

This segues into a recording of Bergman's and Proctor's introduction of their first 1970 Shakespeare parody, "Waiting on the Count of Monte Cristo, or Someone Like Him". This is spliced into the newly written "shipboard scene".

At the end of this scene, Bergman interrupts as continuity announcer Rocky Rokomoto for a commercial break in his Million-dollar Monster Classic "Anything You Want To". This segues into a commercial for "Mr. Yamamoto of Hollywood". The Shakespeare movie returns with the "ghost on the battlements" scene from Martian Space Party.

The next scene is a newly recorded commercial by Austin and Bergman for "La Bomba Shelter", a dive where drug-laced foods are served. Bergman is an African American jazz singer, who taunts WALTER (the Watch-And-Listen-To-Everything Robot, voiced by Ossman) into trying to find him.

=== Side two: "Not Responsible" (23:26) ===
This starts with the sounds of Radio Prison, a cacophony of random trapped radio and TV transmissions enveloping Earth. This segues into the original 1970 recording of The Count of Monte Cristo. Ossman reveals himself as the secret father of Edmund (Proctor); they accidentally stab each other to death; the final couplet is "There's nothing left to say..." "...and no one's left to write an ending to this dumb-assed play."

This segues into more Radio Prison, which now is a real prison in which Japanese detective Young Guy (Austin, a parody of Nick Danger) is being tortured by Lieutenant Bradshaw (Bergman). The radio announcer (Ossman) interrupts for "Puzzle Box", where the show's fans write in to pose trick puzzle questions. Today's question is, "Why does the porridge bird lay his egg in the air?"; Young Guy says the answer will be revealed on tomorrow's show. The show returns with the Martian Space Party scene where Young Guy goes home to his girlfriend Nikki (Proctor) and butler Rotonoto (Ossman). The butler introduces Lieutenant "Brad Shaw" (Bergman), who accuses Young Guy of being all the monsters plaguing the island. Young Guy reveals Brad Shaw to be George Bernard Shaw, "famous author and literary smart-guy", who as a writer, is responsible for all problems he creates. Shaw tries to escape, but Rotonoto knocks Guy and Shaw out with the champagne gong, and takes over the show. He has two tickets for himself and Nikki to the Forbidden City.

This segues into the Natural Surrealist Light People's Party convention which is in the process of nominating George Papoon as its candidate for US president. The convention is covered by newsmen Eric (Ossman), two Walters (Proctor and Austin), and Charles B. Smith (Bergman). (These are named as homage to Eric Sevareid, Walter Cronkite, and Charles Collingwood.) Charles is on Monster Island covering the President's rocket flight to Mars, and its attack by the monster Glutamoto. The rocket's countdown coincides with the convention's countdown for launching the "Papoon Balloon".

As the rocket lifts off, the lilting vocal is repeated, segueing into a reprise of the "Dope Humor of the '70s" commercial, which fades out.

== Release history ==
This album was originally released simultaneously on LP and 8 Track.

- LP - Columbia KC-31585
- 8 Track - Columbia 18C-158

It has been re-released on CD once.

- Laugh.com LGH1075
