= The Firesign Theatre's Box of Danger =

Box of Danger

Box set by The Firesign Theatre
- Released: 2008
- Recorded: 1969–2008
- Genre: Comedy
- Label: Shout! Factory
- Producer: Phil Austin, Peter Bergman, David Ossman, Philip Proctor

The Firesign Theatre chronology
All Things Firesign (2003)	Box of Danger (2008)	Duke of Madness Motors: The Complete "Dear Friends" Radio Era (2010)

The Firesign Theatre's Box of Danger: The Complete Nick Danger Casebook is a four-CD boxed set of most recorded material by comedy group the Firesign Theatre containing their fictional character Nick Danger, portrayed by Phil Austin. Danger is a parody of the hard-boiled detective genre, and is often announced as "Nick Danger, Third Eye", a parody of the term private eye. Danger stories involve stereotypical film noir situations, including mistaken identity, betrayal, and femmes fatales. Danger originally appeared on the 1969 album How Can You Be in Two Places at Once When You're Not Anywhere at All, and was reprised in various live shows, radio appearances and albums, including the 1979 Nick Danger: The Case of the Missing Shoe, 1984 The Three Faces of Al, and 2001 The Bride of Firesign.

== Disc one ==
=== The Further Adventures of Nick Danger ===
Danger debuts in a 28:11 track on side 2 of the 1969 album How Can You Be in Two Places at Once When You're Not Anywhere at All. This is an episode titled "Cut 'Em Off at the Past", of a mock radio program purportedly aired on December 6, 1941. Rocky Rococo comes to Danger's office and attempts to sell him the ring Danger gave Nancy back in college. Danger goes to the mansion where Nancy lives and meets her butler Catherwood. After knocking Danger unconscious, Catherwood and Nancy murder Rococo, who is blackmailing them. They attempt to frame Danger for their crime, but Danger forces Catherwood to reveal the truth, and solves his problem by some means we will never know; the show is interrupted by the news bulletin of President Franklin Delano Roosevelt (Bergman) announcing the Japanese attack on Pearl Harbor.

=== Young Guy Motor Detective ===
On the 1972 live album Not Insane or Anything You Want To, the group presented a self-parody of Nick Danger. This has Austin playing the title role as a Japanese detective Young Guy, Proctor as his Japanese girlfriend Miki, Ossman as the detective's robotic Japanese butler Rotonoto, and Bergman as American police Lieutenant Brad Shaw.

=== School For Actors ===
In 1976, while Proctor and Bergman went on sabbatical from The Firesign Theatre to produce a live show, Austin and Ossman produced a two-act live show, Radio Laffs of 1940. Act one pits Danger against a cabal of Nazi spies conspiring to remake America by converting its radio drama to dadaist surreal humor. Bergman's absence forced the omission of Lieutenant Bradshaw, and Ossman voiced all the non-Danger roles, including several females.

== Disc two ==
=== The Case of the Missing Shoe ===
In 1979, the Firesign Theatre produced five short (2:24) episodes of a prospective comic radio serial. These were released by Rhino Records on a 12:00 EP record.

== Disc three ==
=== The Three Faces of Al ===
This 1984 album was produced without David Ossman, who had temporarily left to produce shows for National Public Radio. This story is inspired by a line in the original "Cut 'Em Off at the Past" where Bradshaw tells Danger, "You're lucky we didn't burn ya on the Anselmo pederasty case." Bradshaw has realized his dream to become District Attorney, and gets his chance to prosecute Danger, who is the apparent suspect in the murder of mob boss Anselmo Von Pederazzi. Nancy and Rocky Rococo also appear.

=== Back From the Shadows ===
All four Firesigns reunited for their second wave in 1993 with a 25th anniversary reunion tour. On November 11, they gave a live performance of the original Nick Danger "Cut 'Em Off At The Past" at Keswick Theatre in Glenside, Pennsylvania. This performance was originally released on the reunion tour album in June 1994.

=== Shack Out On the Alien Highway ===
In October 2001, the Firesign Theatre got a series on XM Satellite Radio titled Fools In Space. They produced seven serial Nick Danger episodes for this show, the first three broadcast on October 27, November 17, and December 15.

== Disc four ==
=== Shack Out On the Alien Highway (continued) ===
The XM Satellite show Fools In Space continued through August 2002. Four more Nick Danger episodes were broadcast on January 26, February 23, April 27, and August 24.

=== All Things Firesign ===
The Firesigns performed approximately once a month on NPR's All Things Considered news program from July 2002 to April 2003, released on a CD album in 2003. Two performances, on October 3 and December 24, featured Nick Danger. The Christmas Eve show featured a parody of the poem A Visit from St. Nicholas.

== Other appearances ==
Nick Danger also appeared on a track of the 2001 album Bride of Firesign, the third installment of the We're Doomed trilogy. This was not included in the Box of Danger. Nick Danger also appeared in the Sparks Media production "Down Under Danger" in which he tackles a case involving the missing continent of Australia.
