= Shoes for Industry: The Best of the Firesign Theatre =

Shoes For Industry! The Best of the Firesign Theatre

Greatest hits album by The Firesign Theatre
- Released: 1993
- Genre: Comedy
- Length: 151:10
- Labels: Laugh.com; Columbia Records (former)
- Producer: The Firesign Theatre

The Firesign Theatre chronology
| Eat or Be Eaten (1985) | Shoes For Industry! The Best of the Firesign Theatre (1993) | Back From the Shadows: The Firesign Theatre's 25th Anniversary Reunion Tour (1994) |

Shoes For Industry: The Best of the Firesign Theatre is the eighteenth comedy album by the Firesign Theatre. Released in 1993 as a two-disk CD on Laugh.com, it is a compilation of tracks from the group's albums recorded during their Golden Age (1968–1975) for Columbia Records. It is an expanded version of the 1976 Columbia compilation LP Forward Into The Past, containing 31 tracks compared to the previous 18. Unlike that LP, it also contains some selections from two solo albums, Proctor and Bergman's TV or Not TV and Phil Austin's Roller Maidens From Outer Space. Its release was coordinated with Back From the Shadows: The Firesign Theatre's 25th Anniversary Reunion Tour.

== Track listing ==
All tracks written by the Firesign Theatre.

=== Disc one ===
| No. | Title | Time | Album |
|---|---|---|---|
| 1 | Temporarily Humboldt County | 9:14 | Waiting for the Electrician or Someone Like Him |
| 2 | Beat the Reaper! | 2:53 | Waiting for the Electrician or Someone Like Him |
| 3 | I Was a Cock-Teaser for Roosterama! | 3:05 | Dear Friends |
| 4 | Ralph Spoilsport Motors | 7:05 | How Can You Be in Two Places at Once When You're Not Anywhere at All |
| 5 | The American Pageant | 9:07 | How Can You Be in Two Places at Once When You're Not Anywhere at All |
| 6 | The Chinchilla Show | 2:38 | Dear Friends |
| 7 | The Further Adventures of Nick Danger | 28:06 | How Can You Be in Two Places at Once When You're Not Anywhere at All |
| 8 | Stab From the Past | 1:16 | Don't Crush That Dwarf, Hand Me the Pliers |
| 9 | Ersatz Bros. Coffee | 0:47 | Don't Crush That Dwarf, Hand Me the Pliers |
| 10 | "High School Madness!" | 6:48 | Don't Crush That Dwarf, Hand Me the Pliers |
| 11 | Napalmolive | 0:52 | Don't Crush That Dwarf, Hand Me the Pliers |
| 12 | Shoes for Industry! | 0:29 | Don't Crush That Dwarf, Hand Me the Pliers |
| 13 | 40 Great Unclaimed Melodies! | 2:26 | Dear Friends |
| 14 | Station Break | 2:14 | Single release |

=== Disc two ===
| No. | Title | Time | Album |
|---|---|---|---|
| 15 | Forward Into the Past | 6:03 | Single release |
| 16 | The Holygram's Song (Back From the Shadows Again) | 1:49 | I Think We're All Bozos on This Bus |
| 17 | The Breaking of the President | 6:16 | I Think We're All Bozos on This Bus |
| 18 | Deputy Dan Has No Friends | 2:27 | Dear Friends |
| 19 | La Bomba Shelter | 1:10 | Not Insane or Anything You Want To |
| 20 | Young Guy, Motor Detective | 8:02 | Not Insane or Anything You Want To |
| 21 | Toad Away | 3:08 | Dear Friends |
| 22 | Not Quite the Solution He Expected | 8:37 | The Tale of the Giant Rat of Sumatra |
| 23 | Bear Whiz Beer | 0:30 | Everything You Know Is Wrong |
| 24 | Happy Hour News | 2:51 | Everything You Know Is Wrong |
| 25 | The Golden Hind | 4:34 | Everything You Know Is Wrong |
| 26 | The Army Training Film | 3:17 | Everything You Know Is Wrong |
| 27 | Police Street | 14:53 | In the Next World, You're on Your Own |
| 28 | Communist Love Song | 4:02 | TV or Not TV |
| 29 | C'mon Jesus | 3:40 | Roller Maidens From Outer Space |
| 30 | Nasi Goring | 2:51 | TV or Not TV |
| 31 | Give Up This Day | 2:01 | TV or Not TV |
