= Humorist =

Intellectual who uses humor in writing or speaking

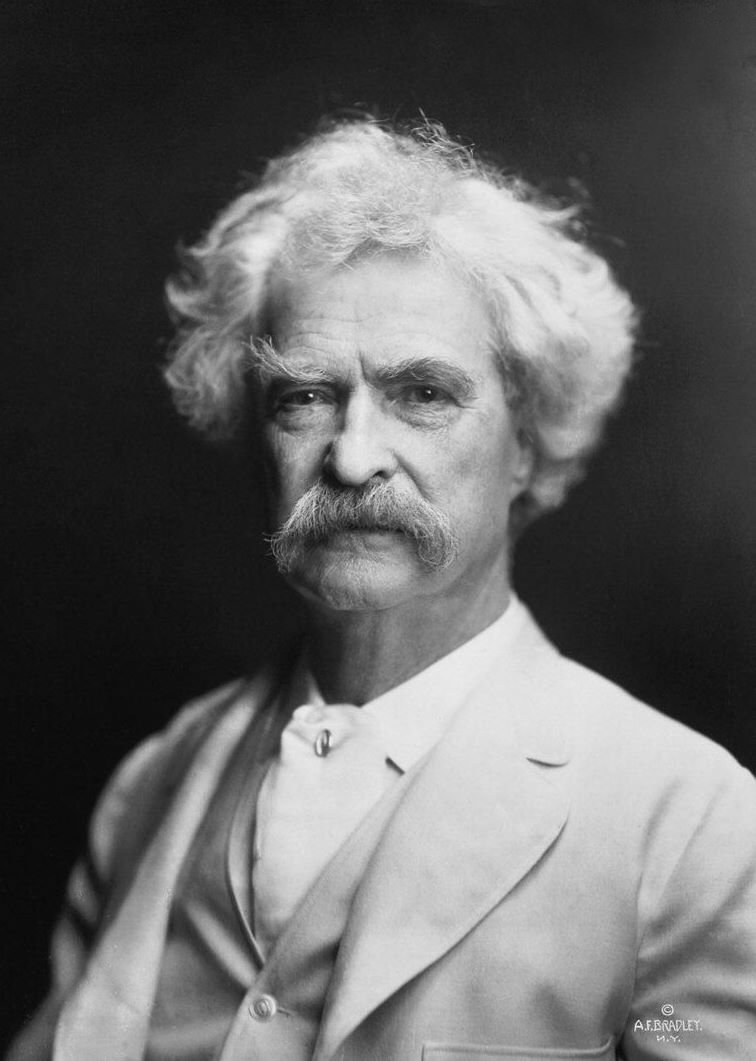
Samuel Clemens, American humorist who wrote under the pen name Mark Twain.

A humorist is an intellectual who uses irony or wit in writing and speaking. A raconteur is one who tells anecdotes in a skillful and amusing way.

Henri Bergson writes that a humorist's work grows from viewing the morals of society.

The term comedian is generally applied to one who is performing to an audience for laughter.

== Distinction from a comedian ==
Humor is the quality which makes experiences provoke laughter or amusement, while comedy is a performing art. The nineteenth-century German philosopher Arthur Schopenhauer lamented the misuse of humor (a German loanword from English) to mean any type of comedy. A humorist is adept at seeing the humor in a situation or aspect of life and relating it, usually through a story; the comedian generally concentrates on jokes designed to invoke instantaneous laughter. The humorist is primarily a writer of books, newspaper or magazine articles or columns, stage or screen plays, and may occasionally appear before an audience to deliver a lecture or narrate a written work. The comedian always performs for an audience, either in live performance, audio recording, radio, television, or film.

Phil Austin, of the comedy group the Firesign Theatre, expressed his thoughts about the difference in 1993 liner notes to the Fighting Clowns album:

To me, there is a great difference between a humorist and a clown, and I had hoped that life for the Firesign Theatre would have led more toward the world of Mark Twain than the world of Beepo. The humorist is a happy soul; he comments from the sidelines of life, safe behind the keyboard or pen; not forced to mold his thinking to the direct response of an audience, he has indirection on his side. He has time to think. Beepo, on the other hand, takes his chances directly facing—or mooning—the audience; a buffoon, a patsy, a performer, he is out in the open and his audience, unlike a humorist's, becomes necessarily half-friend and half-enemy.

== Notable humorists ==
=== Comedians who became humorists ===
Sometimes a comedian will adopt a writing career and gain notability as a humorist. Some examples are:

- Will Rogers (1879–1935) was a vaudeville comedian who started doing humorous political and social commentary, and became a famous newspaper columnist and radio personality during the Great Depression. He is an exception to the education rule, as he only completed a tenth grade education.
- Cal Stewart (1856–1919) was a vaudeville comedian who created the character Uncle Josh Weathersby and toured circuses and medicine shows. He befriended Twain and Rogers, and in 1898 became the first comedian to make sound recordings, on Edison Records.
- Garry Moore (1915–1993), known as a television comedian who hosted several variety and game shows, after his 1977 retirement became a regular humor columnist for the newspaper The Island Packet of Northeast Harbor, Maine, with a column titled "Mumble, Mumble". He later released a book of his columns under the same name in the early 1980s.
- Victor Borge (1909–2000) was a Danish-American comedian known for bringing humor to classical music. He wrote three books, My Favorite Intermissions and My Favorite Comedies in Music (both with Robert Sherman), and the autobiography Smilet er den korteste afstand ("The Smile is the Shortest Distance") with Niels-Jørgen Kaiser.
- Peter Ustinov (1921–2004) was an English comic actor who wrote several humorous plays and film scripts.
- Woody Allen (born 1935), known as a comedian and filmmaker, early in his career worked as a staff writer for humorist Herb Shriner. He also wrote short stories and cartoon captions for magazines such as The New Yorker.
- Steve Martin (born 1945), comedian and actor, wrote Cruel Shoes, a book of humorous essays and short stories, in 1977 (published 1979). He wrote his first humorous play Picasso at the Lapin Agile in 1993, and wrote various pieces in The New Yorker magazine in the 1990s. He later wrote more humorous plays and two novellas.
- Hugh Laurie (born 1959) is an English comic actor who worked for many years in partnership with Stephen Fry. He is a fan of the English humorist P. G. Wodehouse, and has written a Wodehouse-style novel.

== Twain as the iconic American humorist ==
Mark Twain (pen name of Samuel Langhorn Clemens, 1835–1910) was widely considered the "greatest humorist" the U.S. ever produced, as noted in his New York Times obituary. It's a distinction that garnered wide agreement, as William Faulkner called him "the father of American literature".

The United States national cultural center, the John F. Kennedy Center for the Performing Arts, has chosen to award a Mark Twain Prize for American Humor annually since 1998 to individuals who have "had an impact on American society in ways similar to the distinguished 19th century novelist and essayist best known as Mark Twain".
