= Radio Now Live =

Live album by The Firesign Theatre
- Released: 2001
- Recorded: April 25, 1999
- Venue: Aladdin Theater (Portland, Oregon)
- Studio: Arohana Productions
- Genre: Comedy
- Length: Disc 1: 52:40, Disc 2, 65:59
- Label: Firesign Theatre Records
- Producer: Wayne Newitt, Richard Fish

The Firesign Theatre chronology
Bride of Firesign (2001)	Radio Now Live (2001)	Papoon for President (2002)

Radio Now Live is a 2001 comedy album by the Firesign Theatre (Philip Austin, Peter Bergman, David Ossman, and Philip Proctor), recorded from a live performance on a 1999 West Coast tour. Its main concept is based on material from Firesign's studio album Give Me Immortality or Give Me Death, but also contains material based on older albums How Can You Be in Two Places at Once When You're Not Anywhere at All; Don't Crush That Dwarf, Hand Me the Pliers; I Think We're All Bozos on This Bus; and Anythynge You Want To.

== Track listing ==
=== Act one ===
1. Welcome To Portland (2:25)
2. The Wall Of Science (13:15)
3. Babe Buys A New Car (6:00)
4. RadioNow With Bebop Lobo (1:29)
5. Capt. Happy's Traffic Report (3:02)
6. U.S. Plus (2:14)
7. Sports In Your Shorts (3:15)
8. Ralph Spoilsport (2:37)
9. Next To The Last News (1:57)
10. Dr. WinkieDinque (3:00)
11. Goddess Air (1:01)
12. Bebop Works Late (1:27)
13. Trippple Ripppoff (1:28)
14. Bebop The Night Wolf (2:19)
15. Joe Camel Says Goodbye (4:24)
16. Parallel Hell Redux (5:22)

=== Act two ===
1. Nightwhispers (2:33)
2. Nick Danger, Third Eye (19:51)
3. Anythynge You Want To: The Cast (6:12)
4. Anythynge You Want To: The Tower At Dawn (10:35)
5. Anythynge You Want To: The Gravediggers (5:41)
6. Anythynge You Want To: Edmond And Marie (6:31)
7. Anythynge You Want To: Sweet Revenge (9:49)
8. Goodbyes And hellos – 4:46

== Description of the album ==
This album is a recording of a live show performed in Portland, Oregon, April 25, 1999 at the Aladdin Theatre.

== Release history ==
- CD Firesign Theatre Records (Distributed by Whirlwind Media) 2001
- CD Firesign Theatre Records / Lodestone Catatlog MSUG102 2005
