= Giant rat of Sumatra =

Fictional rat

The giant rat of Sumatra is a fictional giant rat, first mentioned by Arthur Conan Doyle in "The Adventure of the Sussex Vampire". As part of the tale, the protagonist, Sherlock Holmes, declares that there is a "story" connected with this rat, presumably a detective case he has handled. The name of the rat and its implied unpublished history were later used in Sherlock Holmes pastiches by many other writers.

== Original reference ==
In "The Adventure of the Sussex Vampire", first published in the January 1924 issues of The Strand Magazine in London and Hearst's International Magazine in New York, Doyle has Sherlock Holmes declare, as an aside, to Dr. Watson:

Matilda Briggs was not the name of a young woman, Watson, ... It was a ship which is associated with the giant rat of Sumatra, a story for which the world is not yet prepared.

How the ship, the rodent, and the island of Sumatra are associated is not specified.

== In Sherlockiana ==
A number of authors of Sherlockiana have endeavoured to supply the missing adventure of the giant rat of Sumatra, either in non-canonical Holmesian fiction, or as references to the tale in other fictional settings:

- In "The Giant Rat of Sumatra", an episode of the radio series The New Adventures of Sherlock Holmes written by Edith Meiser, and first broadcast on 1 March 1942, Professor Moriarty arranges for the titular rodent, infected with bubonic plague, to be transported to England on board the Matilda Briggs. This episode is apparently lost, but is described in some detail by Jim Harmon in his book The Great Radio Heroes.
- In The Spider Woman (1944), Nigel Bruce's Watson briefly reflects on the Giant Rat of Sumatra when looking through a scrapbook of old cases.
- In Pursuit to Algiers (1945), a Holmes film starring Basil Rathbone and Nigel Bruce, Watson tells the story of the Giant Rat of Sumatra to an audience on board a ship. As is typically the case, the plot of the story is not revealed as the scene shifts to the deck outside as soon as Watson begins the tale.
- The Tale of the Giant Rat of Sumatra, a 1974 comedy album by the Firesign Theatre (LP Columbia KC32730) is a pun-filled pastiche featuring the protagonists Hemlock Stones, the 'Great Defective', and his biographer and companion, Dr. John Flotsom, O. D. Part of the narrative takes place aboard the Matilda Briggs and the name of this ship induces the group to perform the song "Frigate Matilda" (to the tune of "Waltzing Matilda"), which has become something of a cult standard.
- "A Father's Tale" is the title of a 1974 short story by Sterling E. Lanier, included in the short story anthologies "Sherlock Holmes Through Time and Space" (published 1984) and "A tale of Brigadier Ffellowes" (published in 1986). The story concerns a mysterious man who identifies himself as Verners, (in Doyle's story The Adventure of the Greek Interpreter Holmes claims to be related to the French painter Horace Vernet). The short story has a similar plot to HG Wells The Island of Doctor Moreau.
- The 1975 novel Sherlock Holmes's War of the Worlds is a sequel to H. G. Wells' science fiction novel The War of the Worlds, written by Manly Wade Wellman and his son Wade Wellman as a pastiche crossover which combines H. G. Wells' extraterrestrial invasion story with Doyle's Sherlock Holmes and Professor Challenger stories. During the course of the narrative, Holmes mentions that Professor Challenger helped solve the case of the giant rat, although the actual name of the case is not stated.
- The Giant Rat of Sumatra is a 1976 novel by Rick Boyer which features the return of The Hound of the Baskervilles villain Stapleton. In this novel, the "giant rat" turns out to be a vicious Malayan tapir. (ISBN 0-586-20087-8)
- In The Talons of Weng-Chiang, a 1977 Doctor Who TV serial set in Victorian London, the hero (dressed in deerstalker and accompanied by a medical doctor with a housekeeper known as Mrs. Hudson) confronts a giant rat in the sewers of London.
- The Holmes-Dracula File is a 1978 novel by Fred Saberhagen in which Holmes and Dracula (who turns out to be related to Holmes) uncover a plot to destroy London with plague-bearing rats, the Giant Rat being a living plague vector.
- "The Giant Rat of Sumatra" is the title of a 1996 short story by Paula Volsky, included in Eternal Lovecraft: The Persistence of H. P. Lovecraft in Popular Culture. (ISBN 978-0-9655901-7-4)
- The Giant Rat of Sumatra is a 1997 title in the Hardy Boys juvenile mystery series, written by Franklin W. Dixon. Frank and Joe Hardy investigate the sabotage of a new musical play based on the Sherlock Holmes story.
- The Giant Rat of Sumatra (1998) is the second novel in the Baker Street Mysteries juvenile series written by Jake and Luke Thoene.
- The Shadow of the Rat is a 1999 novel by David Stuart Davies that deals with the rat, a breed from Sumatra, as part of a biological warfare plot against London, England using the bubonic plague; the Matilda Briggs is the ship that brings the rats to London. The story line echoes the plot of Edith Meiser's radio play mentioned above.
- The 2000 - 2001 television drama series Murder Rooms (featuring the adventures of a young Arthur Conan Doyle and his mentor) includes an episode wherein a circus manager mentions having featured the 'Giant Rat of Sumatra' in his freak show. He confesses that the animal was actually a terrier dog with no fur.
- Sherlock Holmes and the Giant Rat of Sumatra is a 2002 novel by Alan Vanneman. A cousin of Dr. Watson's late wife travels to Baker Street from Singapore to consult Sherlock Holmes regarding her husband's mysterious suicide; the 'Matilda Briggs' does not appear in this book. (Carroll & Graf, ISBN 0-7867-0956-1)
- In Sherlock Holmes and the Giant Rat of Sumatra, a 2010 novel by Paul D. Gilbert, Holmes investigates the mysterious reappearance of the long-overdue clipper 'Matilda Briggs.'
- In 2014, the first episode of the third series of BBC's Sherlock, "The Empty Hearse", features a "giant rat of Sumatra Road", the code name for a villainous politician, Lord Moran, who is acting as a mole for North Korea and plans to detonate a bomb at an abandoned London Underground station called Sumatra Road.
- A chapter in the 2003 book The Oriental Casebook Of Sherlock Holmes by Ted Riccardi relates the story of an Indonesian tribe that worships the still extant giant rat of Sumatra.
- Supernatural giant rats of Sumatra feature heavily in A Case of Possession (2017) by KJ Charles, a British writer of historical and paranormal fiction who often includes Sherlockian allusions in her work.
- The story was performed as a radio script reading, televised on PBS for their Theater of The Mind Radio Drama series.
