= The Three Faces of Al =

Studio album by Firesign Theatre
- Released: 1984
- Recorded: July–December 1983
- Studio: Fred Jones Recording Services, Hollywood CA
- Genre: Comedy
- Length: 33:24
- Label: Rhino Records
- Producer: Fred Jones

Firesign Theatre chronology
Shakespeare's Lost Comedie (1982)	The Three Faces of Al (1984)	Eat or Be Eaten (1985)

Professional ratings
Review scores
Source	Rating
Allmusic	2.5/5 stars

The Three Faces of Al is a 1984 comedy album by the group Firesign Theatre. It features the group members reprising their most popular characters from earlier collaborations, notably hard-boiled detective Nick Danger and his nemesis, Lieutenant Bradshaw.

In earlier albums, the characters refer to the "Anselmo pederasty" case. Even though this album occurs years later than the other albums, it is about that case, but Anselmo Von Pederazzi is a mob boss, and the case is not actually about pederasty.

David Ossman does not appear on the album, having left the group to work as a producer for National Public Radio. Ossman would return in 1998, on the album Give Me Immortality or Give Me Death.

The initial release on Rhino Records was at the dawn of compact discs, and was among or possibly the first comedy CD issued by any record company. The CD wasn't produced in very large quantities, however, and after it went out of print it became something of a collector's item for many years. The album was finally reissued on CD in 2008 as part of The Firesign Theatre's Nick Danger box set, Box of Danger on the Shout! Factory label.
