= Nick Danger: The Case of the Missing Shoe =

EP by The Firesign Theatre
- Released: 1979
- Recorded: January 1979
- Genre: Comedy
- Length: 12:00
- Label: Rhino
- Producer: The Firesign Theatre: Philip Austin, Peter Bergman, David Ossman, Philip Proctor

The Firesign Theatre chronology
Just Folks . . . A Firesign Chat (1977)	Nick Danger: The Case of the Missing Shoe (1979)	Fighting Clowns (1980)

Professional ratings
Review scores
Source	Rating
The Goldmine Comedy Record Price Guide	1.5/4 stars
Allmusic	3/5 stars

Nick Danger: The Case of the Missing Shoe is an EP by the Firesign Theatre. It was released in 1979 by Rhino Records.

== Development ==
The Firesign Theatre introduced its Nick Danger character, played by Phil Austin, in 1969 as a 28:11 track on side 2 of its second album How Can You Be in Two Places at Once When You're Not Anywhere at All.

The character was revived in 1976 for a live show by Austin and David Ossman. In the 1970s, Norman Lear and Bud Yorkin's Tandem Productions bought the rights to Danger for a TV series to star George Hamilton as Danger; and in 1978, New Line Cinema began negotiations to make a movie starring Chevy Chase as Danger. Both projects ended in development limbo, and rights to the Danger character reverted to the Firesigns.

In December 1978, the Firesign Theatre began writing five short (2:24) episodes of The Case of the Missing Shoe for a possible syndicated daily Nick Danger radio series (similar to Chickenman which aired in the late 1960s). When the syndication went unsold, Austin approached Rhino Records and secured a deal to release the five episodes on a 12-minute extended play (EP) record. Recording began in January 1979.

== Plot ==
Five short radio episodes involve Nick Danger's attempt to find out what has happened to his missing left shoe. The plot thickens as he quickly discovers that everyone's left shoe is missing. Each episode begins with a traditional old-time radio style introduction by an announcer with an organ in the background and each show also includes a commercial parody (including commercials for "Ma Rainey's wholesome moleskin cookies" and "Gerald Ford commemorative cheese flags"). Besides Nick Danger himself, some of the other regular Nick Danger characters appear, including Lt. Bradshaw, Nancy, and Rocky Rococo.

== Release history ==
This album was issued simultaneously on EP and Cassette.

- Rhino RNEP 506
- Rhino RNC 506

It was reissued in 2008 as part of The Firesign Theatre's Box of Danger (Shout! Factory 826663–10780),
