= Back in the Saddle Again =

Song performed by Gene Autry

Single by Gene Autry
- B-side: "Little Old Band Of Gold"
- Released: September 22, 1939
- Recorded: April 18, 1939
- Studio: CBS Columbia Square Studio, Hollywood, California
- Genre: Cowboy music, country & Western
- Label: Vocalion 5080
- Songwriters: Gene Autry, Ray Whitley

Gene Autry singles chronology
"Gonna Round Up My Blues" (1939)	"Back in the Saddle Again" (1939)	"South of the Border (Down Mexico Way)" (1939)

"Back in the Saddle Again" was the signature song of American cowboy entertainer Gene Autry. It was co-written by Autry with Ray Whitley and first released in 1939. The song was associated with Autry throughout his career and was used as the name of Autry's autobiography in 1976. Members of the Western Writers of America chose it as fifth of the Top 100 Western songs of all time.

== History ==
Although the song has long been associated with Gene Autry, the original version of "Back in the Saddle Again" was written by Ray Whitley for the film Border G-Man (RKO Pictures, June 24, 1938) starring George O'Brien, Laraine Day, and Ray Whitley in which Ray Whitley and his Six Bar Cowboys sang the song. With Ray Whitley's Rangers, Whitley recorded the song for Decca Records on 26 October 1938, matrix number 64701, issued as Decca 5628 backed with "On the Painted Desert", matrix number 64703.

Gene Autry liked the song and together with Whitley revised it and recorded it in April 1939, then performed "Back in the Saddle Again" on film in Rovin' Tumbleweeds (Republic Pictures, November 16, 1939), and introduced it as his theme song for Gene Autry's Melody Ranch, which premiered over the CBS Radio Network on January 7, 1940, on which the show ran until 1956. The song also became the title song for the Autry film Back in the Saddle (Republic Pictures, March 14, 1941).

Gene Autry recorded "Back in the Saddle Again" for the first time on April 18, 1939, in Los Angeles for American Record Corporation (ARC), which had been acquired by Columbia Broadcasting System (CBS) in December 1938, matrix number LA 1865, released on Vocalion 5080. LA 1865 also issued on the Conqueror, OKeh, and Columbia labels. Early Vocalion and Conqueror labels say "BACK TO THE SADDLE". Conqueror was a private label for Sears. In the U.K. markets LA 1865 issued on the EMI Regal Zonophone label. Gene Autry later made two additional commercial recordings of the song, both for Columbia Recording Corporation (previously ARC). Matrix number HCO 1707 recorded on February 13, 1946, issued on the Columbia label. Matrix number RHCO 10195 recorded on June 19, 1952, also issued on Columbia. The matrix number is found in the run-out groove area of the record and is often also shown on the record label. The prefix indicates the facility where the recording was made. Often there are several takes for a recording. The matrix number in the run-out area may also include a suffix to identify the take used for the issue.

In addition to being used as the theme for Autry's radio program Gene Autry's Melody Ranch, "Back in the Saddle Again" was also used for The Gene Autry Show on television as well as for personal appearances.

In 1971, the comedy group Firesign Theatre wrote lyrics to the parody song "Back From the Shadows Again" for their album I Think We're All Bozos on This Bus. The song was sung by three computer-generated hologram characters when they appeared. The group reused the parody title in 1993 for their 25th anniversary reunion concert tour and its live recording album.

The 1993 film Sleepless in Seattle included "Back in the Saddle Again" as one of "a number of standards" heard in its soundtrack.

== Honors ==
- Autry's 1939 recording of "Back in the Saddle Again" became his second gold record.
- In 1997, the song was inducted into the Grammy Hall of Fame.
- In 2001, a group of voters selected by the RIAA ranked "Back in the Saddle Again" the 98th best song of the Twentieth Century.
- In 2010 Slim Whitman released the track on his Twilight on the Trail album.

== Discography ==
78rpm commercial phonograph recordings and issues of "Back in the Saddle Again"

Session Date	Matrix No.	Artist	Label and Issue Number
26 Oct 1938	64701	Ray Whitley's Rangers	Decca 5628
18 Apr 1939	LA 1865	Gene Autry	Vocalion 05080, OKeh 05080, Conqueror 9341, 9544, Columbia 20036, 37010
25 Feb 1942	DLA 2914	Eddie Dean	Decca 6034
13 Feb 1946	HCO 1707	Gene Autry	Columbia 20084, 37183 (included in Columbia Set C 120 Gene Autry's Western Classics), Columbia Hall of Fame 52026
19 Jun 1952	RHCO 10195	Gene Autry with Carl Cotner's Orchestra and the Cass County Boys	MJV-148, 90168-V
