= How Time Flys =

Studio album by David Ossman and the Firesign Theatre
- Released: 1973
- Recorded: 1973
- Genre: Comedy
- Length: 40:55
- Label: Columbia
- Director: David Ossman and Steve Gillmor
- Producer: Steve Gillmor

The Firesign Theatre chronology
Not Insane or Anything You Want To (1972)	How Time Flys (1973)	Roller Maidens From Outer Space (1974)

How Time Flys is a comedy album written by David Ossman and featuring the voice talents of all four members of The Firesign Theatre plus several other contributors. It was originally released by Columbia Records in 1973.

== Character development ==
David Ossman first created the Mark Time character as a parody of Flash Gordon for a November 1970 episode of The Firesign Theatre's radio show Dear Friends. In 1972, inspired by a news story about a hypothesized tenth Planet X, he wrote a story line with the character being sent on a voyage to Planet X, for use in the radio broadcast and movie Martian Space Party, recorded on the album Not Insane or Anything You Want To. When the Firesigns took a sabbatical from writing as a group in 1973, Ossman adapted the Planet X plot to an album which he wrote solo, but cast the other three Firesigns in important roles.

== Plot ==
Side one: NIGHTSIDE—DECEMBER 31, 1999 (24:10)

1. Mark's Awakening (Midnight) (4:40) Solo astronaut Mark Time, launched from Earth in 1979 on an exploratory voyage to "Planet X", returns to Earth just before midnight on New Year's Eve, 1999. Mark is awakened from hibernation by the rocket's computer system.
2. The Years In Your Ears with Jim & Nellie Houseafire (recorded in May 1995) (6:30) A prerecorded history video plays to bring Mark up-to-date on the events that have taken place on Earth during the latter half of the 20th century while he was away.
3. Tweeny and "The Welcome Home" (pre-programmed in October 1995) (10:55) Mark is unable to communicate with his Earth landing site, but is greeted on landing at the abandoned launch facility by an aged caretaker robot named "Tweeny", the sole inhabitant of what is now the "President's Memorial Space Museum". Society has forgotten all about Mark; there are only holographic recordings of an Air Force general and deceased President William D. Gazatchorn (who sounds like Richard Nixon) left to welcome and congratulate him on accomplishing his mission. As Mark resigns himself to his imminent retirement, he is drugged unconscious by Tweeny, who is then deactivated.
4. Manny, "Shortstop", and Lady Ann (Dawn) (2:05) Mark is kidnapped by Manny and Shortstop, two robotic minions of a mysterious "Mr. M", along with the holographic recordings Mark made of his voyage to Planet X.

Side two: DAYSIDE—DECEMBER 31, 1999 (16:45)

1. Consumer Instruction Section with Patsy Pending & Bruno Uvula (Manditory) (2:10) The commercially prepared instruction header from one of Mark's holographic recording tapes is heard.
2. Mark, Mr. Motion, and The Memory Loops with Manny and "Shortstop" aboard the Gilda (Noon) (8:05) Mark awakens aboard Mr. Motion's zeppelin, to a hologram recording of his landing on Planet X. Motion tells Mark he plans to sell the recordings as entertainment. Mark protests that his research should be made available to the news media and freely disseminated to the public, but Mr. Motion tells him that Mark's news would be judged as no more important than any of the other stories continually published by an "all news, all the time" media. Mark protests his information is "not entertainment, it's real", to which Mr. Motion counters that Mark simply went on location and took photos: that's entertainment. Motion brings the zeppelin above the theme park, "Panoramaland 2000" (similar to 2008 Las Vegas) that features life-sized holographic replicas of world-famous buildings and monuments, and he begins to show Mark's holograms to the public. Mark's holograms combine with the theme park holograms, and the squid-like inhabitants of Planet X appear to cavort around the theme park. Mark escapes from the zeppelin and is interviewed by reporter Chiquita Bandana.
3. Emergency Program Over-Ride with Jim Dundee and W. C. Bingle (Live from Panoramaland 2000) (5:55) Mark's interview is interrupted by an emergency bulletin by Dr. Progresso Sweetheart, who announces that a black hole is approaching the Earth.
4. The System vs. The Black Hole (New Year's Eve) (:45) The black hole puts Mark into a time loop, and he finds himself back in his spaceship just before midnight, repeating his landing approach to Earth.

== Cast ==
- David Ossman as Mark Time
- Philip Proctor as Tweeny and Freddy Burns
- Peter Bergman as Mr. Motion and Dr. Progresso Sweetheart
- Phil Austin as President William D. Gazatchorn
- Wolfman Jack as Jim Dundee
- Harry Shearer and Penny Nichols as Jim and Nellie Houseafire
- Lew Irwin as W. C. Bingle
- Helena Kallianiotes (one of the hitchhikers in Five Easy Pieces) as Roxanne Pavemente
- Jock Livingston (a Hollywood restaurant owner) as Gen. George "Crash" Gorgon, USAF, Ret.
- Tiny (Ossman's wife) as Nurse Angela and Chiquita Bandana
- Richard Paul as Shortstop, Manny Grossero, and Bruno Uvula
- Anna Cheverton Drury as Lady Ann
- Jon Knoll as The Ground Control Dude
- Sheilah Wells as Patsy Pending
- Steve Gillmor as Arnie Zonker
- Mike Rozsa and Scott Weintraub

== Release history ==
- Stereo LP - Columbia KC-32411
- Audio CD - laugh.com 126:LGH1149.2

== LP Contents ==
The Stereo LP includes a stiff paper insert that can be broken apart and assembled to form a "3-D Diorama" of the album cover art, which shows Mark descending from the Zeppelin over Panoramaland 2000.

The LP insert states that the album was written and produced from March 11, 1973 to June 7, 1973 "in Wally Heider Studios 3 & 4 and on location".
