= The Firesign Theatre's Big Book of Plays =

1972 book by The Firesign Theatre

The Firesign Theatre's Big Book Of Plays
- Author: The Firesign Theatre
- Cover artist: Virginia Clive-Smith
- Subject: radio drama, play scripts, sketch comedy
- Publisher: Straight Arrow Books
- Publication date: 1972
- Media type: Paperback
- Pages: 144
- ISBN: 978-0-87932-028-7
- OCLC: 482617
- Followed by: The Firesign Theatre's Big Mystery Joke Book

The Firesign Theatre's Big Book Of Plays is a collection of transcriptions written by The Firesign Theatre for the title tracks of each of their first four albums. The book also contains some introductory material that is serious as well a few pieces that parody introductory material. Photos of the group—childhood photos, casual snapshots, and full-costume publicity shots vaguely related to the written material—are included. The book concludes with "Lt. Bradshaw's Secret Indentity [sic] Roster" which indicates which member of the group performs each major role. Some of the material from the group's first four albums that was not included in this collection can be found in the 1974 book, The Firesign Theatre's Big Mystery Joke Book. A later printing of the "Big Book of Plays" (circa 1980) has a bright yellow cover, with different cover illustrations than the original shown here.

== Table of Contents ==
- A Straight, Forward Look at the Firesign Theatre
- Who Am Us Anyway?
- Waiting for the Electrician or Someone Like Him
  - Revolution or Revelation
  - May I see your Passport, Please?
  - The Script
- How Can You Be in Two Places at Once When You're Not Anywhere at All
  - The Perfect Ralph Williams Mantra
  - Welcome to Side Six
  - The Script
- Don't Crush That Dwarf, Hand Me the Pliers
  - It's Just This Little Chromium Switch Here
  - "A Life in the Day"
  - The Script
- I Think We're All Bozos on This Bus
  - If Bees Lived Inside Your Head
  - Intrat Et Exit Ut Nil Supra!
  - The Script
- Addenda, Appendix and Et Cetera
  - Mark Time's True Chronology of The Firesign Theatre
  - Lt. Bradshaw's Secret Indentity Roster
