= Lawyer's Hospital =

- Cover art by William Stout

Compilation album by The Firesign Theatre
- Released: 1982
- Genre: Comedy
- Length: 37:28
- Label: Rhino Records
- Producer: The Firesign Theatre

The Firesign Theatre chronology
Fighting Clowns (1980)	Lawyer's Hospital (1982)	Shakespeare's Lost Comedie (1982)

Lawyer's Hospital is the fourteenth comedy album by the Firesign Theatre. Released in 1982 on Rhino Records, it is a compilation of live performances (some dating from as far back as 1969), augmented by radio segments recorded for NPR and additional material from various sources.

== Synopsis ==
Side 1 Lawyer's Hospital (18:28)

This contains two performances from the Firesigns' National Tour of 1981.

Side 2 Politics As Usual (19:00)

The first three skits were originally recorded as part of "The Campaign Chronicles," the Firesign Theatre's coverage of the 1980 presidential election on National Public Radio's news program Morning Edition.

- "Profiles in Butter"
- "Jimmy Clicker"
- The Golf Rat Shoot"
- "Thank You, Mr. President" — Writing for this started in 1979, when the group reunited after a sabbatical.
- "The Jack Poet Commercials" — These were advertisement spots for a Highland Park, California Volkswagen dealership, which aired starting in 1969 on the Firesigns' KPFK FM Los Angeles radio program, Radio Free Oz.
