= The Tale of the Giant Rat of Sumatra =

Studio album by The Firesign Theatre
- Released: January 1974
- Genre: Comedy
- Length: 40:41
- Label: Columbia
- Producer: The Firesign Theatre

The Firesign Theatre chronology
Roller Maidens From Outer Space (1974)	The Tale of the Giant Rat of Sumatra (1974)	Everything You Know Is Wrong (1974)

Professional ratings
Review scores
Source	Rating
The New Rolling Stone Record Guide	2/5 stars
Allmusic	3/5 stars

The Tale of the Giant Rat of Sumatra is the seventh comedy album produced by the Firesign Theatre and released in January 1974 by Columbia Records. It is a Sherlock Holmes pastiche story loosely inspired by "The Adventure of the Sussex Vampire" by Arthur Conan Doyle.

== Title and narrative premise ==
A giant rat of Sumatra is briefly mentioned in a throw-away line in "The Adventure of the Sussex Vampire", a story in The Case-Book of Sherlock Holmes by Arthur Conan Doyle. The rat is implied to have been part of an unrelated adventure, but details are not provided. The ambiguity surrounding the rat and its relationship to Sherlock Holmes caused authors of Sherlock Holmes pastiches to create stories based on it. The Tale of the Giant Rat of Sumatra is one such pastiche.

Philip Proctor plays detective Hemlock Stones (Sherlock Holmes) and David Ossman plays Dr. Flotsam (Dr. Watson), his "patient doctor and biographer". The lighthearted tale is full of puns, including a running gag in which Flotsam, eager to chronicle the adventure, tries to write down everything Stones says but mishears it all as something similar-sounding; for example, "rattan-festooned" is written down as "rat-infested." Allusions also are made to Sherlock Holmes's use of cocaine, his violin playing, and other familiar story elements.

== Reception ==
Members of the group themselves have taken varied attitudes towards this album. In the liner notes to Shoes for Industry: The Best of the Firesign Theatre, David Ossman was cheerful when discussing it and said that "I always thought it was the closest thing to the relentlessly pun-filled one-acts we did in clubs." Phil Austin, on the other hand, said, "The Sherlock Holmes album didn't do anybody any good . . . the general public was by that point beginning to tire of psychedelia anyway, and we were unfortunately always going to be associated with that."

The review in 1983's The New Rolling Stone Record Guide calls this album "A halfassed comeback containing only one good joke."

The Firesign Theatre commentary website benway.com calls it "the least understood Firesign album" and notes that "careful listening reveals Firesign in all their glory: poetic ("blackening peasant's houses", "me and the doc on the dock with the dog -- the deadly dog"), silly ("I sat on my pipe!"), strange (the hole in Lake Acme), and filled with meaning and non-meaning alike. It is well worth repeated listenings—it rivals "Bozos" and "Dwarf" in number of listenings—and pays dividends of laughter and insight."

== Notes ==
- Firesign Theatre. The Tale of the Giant Rat of Sumatra. Columbia Records, 1974.
- Firesign Theatre. Firesign Theatre. 19 Jan. 2006 <http://www.firesigntheatre.com/>.
- "FIREZINE: Linques!." Firesign Theatre FAQ. 20 Jan. 2006 <http://firezine.net/faq/>.
- Smith, Ronald L. The Goldmine Comedy Record Price Guide. Iola: Krause, 1996.
