= Give Me Immortality or Give Me Death =

Studio album by The Firesign Theatre
- Released: September 1998
- Recorded: February 3–April 1, 1998
- Studio: Sunburst Recording, Culver City, CA
- Genre: Comedy
- Label: Rhino
- Producer: The Firesign Theatre

The Firesign Theatre chronology
Pink Hotel Burns Down (1996)	Give Me Immortality or Give Me Death (1998)	Boom Dot Bust (1999)

Give Me Immortality or Give Me Death is a comedy album by the Firesign Theatre that was released in 1998 on Rhino Records. Its main theme satirizes 1990s radio formats and public hysteria over the Y2K programming bug. Give Me Immortality... is the first of the Firesign Theatre's Millennium CD trilogy We're Doomed, which includes Boom Dot Bust and Bride of Firesign.

== Synopsis ==
The album takes the form of a fictional radio broadcast on the night of December 31, 1999. Radio Now is a FunFunTown (apparently modeled after Los Angeles, California) radio station whose format changes approximately every hour at the slightest whims of overzealous market researchers and focus groups. The album chronicles Radio Now's attempt to operate normally on the final day before the year 2000, a day riddled with apocalyptic omens, rampant computer errors, and dangerous doomsayers. The station is populated by DJ Bebop Loco (also known as Bebop Lobo) (Phil Austin), his producer Dwayne (Peter Bergman), news anchors Harold Hiphugger (David Ossman) and Ray Hamberger (Philip Proctor), sports commentator Chump Threads (Bergman), and self-help guru O'Nann Winquedinque (Austin). Also reporting from outside the station are celebrity stalker Danny Vanilla (Ossman) and helicopter-bound traffic reporter Col. Happy Pandit (Proctor).

== Themes ==
The album, made in 1998, lampoons the various world-threatening results which were being predicted from the Y2K bug. It also satirizes the media exploitation of the death of Diana, Princess of Wales, the Joe Camel controversy, and Art Bell's radio show Coast to Coast AM.

A running gag involves eyeballs, which at one moment represent binary digits (the digit 1 resembles the letter I, a homophone of "eye", while the digit 0 is in the shape of a ball) and at other times seem to be an allusion to The Residents ("Guyz in Eyeball Hats"). Another is "U.S. Plus", an apparent multi-national conglomerate with intentionally vague commercials that hint at their all-encompassing presence ("We're U.S. Plus. We own the idea...of America!"). The urbane, sophisticated Goddess Airways commercials promise "no bloody babies" on their flights.

== References to earlier Firesign Theatre albums ==
This is the second album by the Firesign Theatre to be set on December 31, 1999. The first was How Time Flys written by Ossman but featuring all four members of The Firesign Theatre in the cast.

Used car dealer Ralph Spoilsport (Proctor), last heard in How Can You Be in Two Places at Once When You're Not Anywhere at All, appears selling used body parts in a "going out of body" sale.

Newscasters Harold Hiphugger (Ossman) and Ray Hamberger (Proctor), introduced in Everything You Know Is Wrong, work at the Radio Now station.

Caroline Presskey (Proctor), a gameshow contestant on Don't Crush That Dwarf, Hand Me the Pliers, is heard in a telephone conversation.

== Track listing ==
1. Unconscious Village: Wake Up
2. Eyeballs In The Sky
3. U.S. Plus: Pork
4. The Celebrity Stalker
5. Sports In Your Shorts
6. Ralph Spoilsport's Going Out Of Body Sale
7. The News Drought Continues
8. Goddess Air Presents 'Hullo, Don't Worry!'
9. A Developing Chase Situation
10. Pull My String
11. Princess Goddess Escapes The Celebrazzis
12. Chump Takes Some Hits
13. Polar Pro: Texas Trots
14. Miss Shelob's Feelin' Poorly
15. Unconscious Village: Last Days Sale
16. Mr. Coffee Comes Up Zeros
17. Glacier
18. Gridlock At Homeless Stadium
19. Polar Ice: Party Vertical
20. Going, Going, Gone á la Blonde
21. Sex With My Hat
22. Trippple Ripppoff
23. Night Whispers
24. Bebop And Dwayne Feel No Pain
25. Smokin' Joe Says Farewell
26. U.S. Plus: Zeros And Ones
27. Chump Makes A Resolution
28. The Doll Drop
29. RadioNow Says Good-By And Hello

== 2025 Reissue ==
Give Me Immortality or Give Me Death was reissued in 2025 by Bandcamp as a digital download with newly remastered album audio, plus 14 bonus tracks including their 1996 piece "Everything You Know Is Wrong...About the Future", their series of fake spots for April Fool's 1997, never-released bits, and a behind-the-scenes eavesdrop on the studio worksession in which Firesign wrote & performed "Good-By And Hello".
