= Bride of Firesign =

Studio album by The Firesign Theatre
- Released: 2001
- Studio: Sunburst Recording, Culver City, CA
- Genre: Comedy
- Length: 64:19
- Label: Rhino
- Producer: Phil Austin, Peter Bergman, David Ossman, Philip Proctor

The Firesign Theatre chronology
Boom Dot Bust (1999)	Bride of Firesign (2001)	Radio Now Live (2001)

Professional ratings
Review scores
Source	Rating
AllMusic	4/5 stars

Bride of Firesign is a comedy album by the Firesign Theatre released in 2001 by Rhino Records. It is the third volume of the Firesign's Millennium Trilogy We're Doomed, following Give Me Immortality or Give Me Death (1998) and Boom Dot Bust (1999).

== Track listing ==
All tracks are written by the Firesign Theatre

Something Old, Something Nude
No.	Title	Length
1.	"Pulling It Off as a Man"	2:26
2.	"Whaz Reeaal!"	6:27
3.	"Nick Danger's L-O-S-T G-A-L-S"	7:16
4.	"The Bride Stripped Bare"	5:53

Something Buried, Something Rude
No.	Title	Length
5.	"Low-Glow Land"	5:55
6.	"Xeno's Paradise"	6:20
7.	"The Haystack in the Needle"	5:16
8.	"Dr. Firesign's Plastic Beauty Saloon"	4:47
9.	"The Graverobber's Roadshow"	5:59
Total length:		64:19
