= Fighting Clowns =

Live album by The Firesign Theatre
- Released: 1980
- Genre: Comedy
- Length: 38:50
- Label: Rhino
- Producer: The Firesign Theatre and Fred Jones

The Firesign Theatre chronology
Nick Danger: The Case of the Missing Shoe (1979)	Fighting Clowns (1980)	Lawyer's Hospital (1982)

Professional ratings
Review scores
Source	Rating
Allmusic	link
The Goldmine Comedy Record Price Guide	2/4 stars

Fighting Clowns is a 1980 concept album by the Firesign Theatre, taking place at a fictional USO-type camp show. It is unique among Firesign Theatre albums because it is primarily made up of songs rather than the group's usual audio theater or sketch comedy pieces. Many of the songs on this album were recorded live in front of an audience while some of the songs and much of the linking material was recorded in the studio. Cover artwork was done by Phil Hartman.

== Track listing ==
=== Side one ===
1. "The Bozos Song"
2. "The Four Gobs"
3. "The 8 Shoes"
4. "In The Hot Tub"
5. "Hey, Reagan"

=== Side two ===
1. "In The War Zone"
2. "Oh, Afghanistan"
3. "In The Alley"
4. "Violent Juvenile Freaks"
5. "In The Hot Tub Again"
6. "This Bus Won't Go To War"

=== Bonus tracks ===
1. "Jimmy Carter"

== Performers ==
- Phil Austin — Vocals and Rhythm Guitar
- Peter Bergman — Vocals
- David Ossman — Vocals
- Philip Proctor — Vocals
- Richard Parker — Keyboards
- Jeff Baxter — Lead Guitar
- Tim Emmons — Bass
- Ed Roscetti — Drums
- John Mitchell — Tenor & Baritone Sax
- Dick Spencer — Alto Sax & Clarinet
- Richard Cooper — Trumpet ^{[3a]}
- Phil Hartman — Album Cover Illustration ^{[4]}

== Release history ==
There have been numerous issues and re-issues of this album (and excerpts from this album) in a variety of formats including a one-sided picture disc.

- LP - Rhino RNLP-018 - 1980
- Cassette — Rhino RNC-018 - 1980
- Picture Disc — Rhino RNPD-904 - 1980
- CD Mobile Fidelity MFCD-748 - 1993
- CD Firesign Theatre Records (distributed through Whirlwind Media) - 2001
- CD Firesign Theatre Records / Lodestone Catalog 2006

== Citations ==
1. Smith, Ronald L. The Goldmine Comedy Record Price Guide. Iola: Krause, 1996.
2. Carruthers, Sean. "Fighting Clowns > Overview." Allmusic. March 4, 2006 – 10:3hq7g4gttvoz.
3. ^{a} ^{b} Firesign Theatre. Fighting Clowns. Mobile Fidelity, 1993.
4. Proctor, Phil (September 1, 2012), "Phil's Fame" (PDF), Planet Proctor: 5
