= Roller Maidens from Outer Space =

Studio album by Phil Austin and the Firesign Theatre
- Released: March 1974
- Genre: Comedy
- Label: Epic
- Producer: Phil Austin

The Firesign Theatre chronology
How Time Flys (1973)	Roller Maidens from Outer Space (1974)	The Tale of the Giant Rat of Sumatra (1974)

Roller Maidens From Outer Space is a 1974 comedy album by Phil Austin, one of the members of the comedy group Firesign Theatre. Although the record is considered to be Austin's "solo" album, the other three Firesigns make vocal contributions throughout, and are thanked by Austin in the liner notes. A complex lampoon on television and society, Austin's record is much in the same vein as the Firesign Theatre's Don't Crush That Dwarf, Hand Me the Pliers and fellow Firesign members Phil Proctor and Peter Bergman's TV or Not TV. The television theme is carried over into the record sleeve, which features liner information displayed as if it were a TV Guide listing, complete with stylized channel numbers and little blurbs of content.

== Track listing ==
=== Side one ===
1. "Lord Jim Crappington - 1:49"
2. "C'mon Jesus - 3:40"
3. "Carhook - 3:34"
4. "The Regular and Ethyl Show - 1:28"
5. "Switchblade Pitchforks - 2:21"
6. "The John Fresno Story - 10:15"

=== Side two ===
1. "The Bad News - 4:12"
2. "T.V. - 1:03"
3. "Celebrity Roller Rassling - 2:56"
4. "A Square Dance - 2:19"
5. "Dick Private's Personal Peril - 3:38"
6. "The Thrilling End - 8:35"

=== Story ===
Like Firesign's Nick Danger, Dick Private (Austin), the hero and narrator of this album is a hard-boiled detective. Normally he is the hero of his own detective show Carhook, but when he takes on client Regular Boinklin (who sounds like Ozzie Nelson), he finds himself crossing channels to Boinklin's Regular and Ethyl Show, a sitcom parody of The Adventures of Ozzie and Harriet. He aids Boinklin, neighbor Tricky Retardo (David Ossman) (who, along with his wife Juicy (Philip Proctor), parodies the principal characters of I Love Lucy), and Tricky's brother Jesus (Austin), who all want to know what Juicy and Ethyl are doing at the weekly meetings of their club, the Roller Maidens From Outer Space.

It turns out the Roller Maidens have been subverted by a plot that involves both malevolent aliens and a character who might actually be the Devil.

The album features contemporary drug references, references to pop culture, and songs in a variety of genres that advance the plot. It ends with an apocalyptic battle, including "...pillars of fire taller than I'd ever seen before."
