= Dear Friends (album) =

Compilation album by The Firesign Theatre
- Released: January 1972
- Recorded: September 1970 – February 1971
- Genre: Comedy
- Length: 74:07
- Label: Columbia
- Producer: The Firesign Theatre

The Firesign Theatre chronology
I Think We're All Bozos on This Bus (1971)	Dear Friends (1972)	Not Insane or Anything You Want To (1972)

Professional ratings
Review scores
Source	Rating
The New Rolling Stone Record Guide	2/5 stars

Dear Friends is the Firesign Theatre's fifth album to be released on Columbia Records. It is a compilation album, collecting the Firesigns' choice of the best comedy sketches from their nationally syndicated radio program produced from September 1970 to February 1971.

== Track listing ==
All tracks by The Firesign Theatre

=== Side One - “A Properly Religious Opening” ===
1. Toad Away – 3:19 - 12/13/70
2. Sodom And Jubilee – 3:15 - 12/13/70
3. Freezing Mr. Foster – 2:38 - 11/1/70
4. I Was A Cock-Teaser For Roosterama! – 3:05 - 11/1/70
5. Deputy Dan Has No Friends – 2:28 - 11/1/70
6. The Someday Funnies – 1:56 - 1/10/71
7. A Funny Thing Happened On The Way To The Inquisition – 1:42 - 10/18/70

=== Side Two - “The T.V. Set” ===
1. The T.B. Guide – 5:50 - 10/25/70
2. 40 Great Unclaimed Melodies! (Live From The Ash Grove 11/15/70) – 2:27 - 11/15/70
3. The Chinchilla Show – 2:39 - 10/11/70 (a rebroadcast of a segment performed on The Firesign Theatre Radio Hour Hour on 2/22/70)
4. Live From The Senate Bar (If You Call That Living) – 2:55 - 10/4/70
5. Minority Street – 1:11 - 12/13/70
6. Dr. Whiplash – 3:24 - 1/24/71

=== Side Three - “Animals Vegetables and Minerals” ===
1. Echo Poem – 2:02 - 1/17/71
2. The Small Animal Administration – 1:54 - 10/25/70
3. The Giant Toad – 1:04 - 10/25/70
4. The T.V. Glide – 3:34 - 12/13/70
5. Balliol Bros. – 0:45 - 11/1/70
6. Poop's Principles – 2:25 - 10/25/70
7. International Youth-Sex On Parade – 1:41 - 10/18/70
8. Brickbreaking – 2:03 - 1/24/71
9. Coal! – 3:00 - 10/25/70

=== Side Four - “It's Sure Realistic!” ===
1. Duke Of Madness Motors – 1:23 - 1/17/71
2. Mark Time! – 3:52 - 10/25/70
3. Driving For Dopers – 4:29 - 1/10/71
4. Praise The Hoove! – 2:22 - 12/13/70
5. Bob's Brazerko Lounge – 0:57 - 1/24/71
6. $100.00 Ben – 3:19 - 1/24/71
7. Sleep – 1:07 - 1/24/71

The dates following the track listing for the tracks on this album indicate the date of the live show at which this track was recorded.

== Production ==
Between September 9, 1970 and February 17, 1971 The Firesign Theatre performed Dear Friends, a one-hour live show on radio station KPFK in Los Angeles. These shows were recorded by the group, and then edited into slightly shorter shows which they syndicated to radio stations across the country on 12 inch white label LPs.

The group later collected what they considered to be the best segments from the radio program and compiled a double album. The tracks on each side were selected thematically, and each side was given its own sub-title.

It is one of the few Firesign albums to mention that individual members wrote some of the pieces (Phil Austin wrote "The T.B. Guide," Philip Proctor wrote "The Chinchilla Show" and "Dr. Whiplash," David Ossman wrote "Mark Time!" and Peter Bergman wrote "$100 Ben" and several commercial parodies he performed individually). However, the label composer credit for all pieces is to the Firesign Theatre.

== Issues and reissues ==
This album was originally released simultaneously on LP, cassette, 8-track, and reel-to-reel.

- LP - Columbia KG-31099
- Cassette - Columbia GA-31099
- 8-Track - Columbia GT-31099
- Reel-to-Reel - Columbia GR-30199

It has been reissued on CD at least twice

- 1992 - Mobile Fidelity MFCD-758
- 2001 - Laugh.com LGH1074

== Related albums ==
The group's 2010 Duke of Madness Motors: The Complete "Dear Friends" Radio Era set is a combination book and data DVD comprising a complete compilation, totaling over 80 hours, of their 1970s radio shows Firesign Theatre Radio Hour Hour, Dear Friends, and Let's Eat (the last two in both original broadcast, and syndication-edited form).

Another album distilled from the Duke of Madness Motors set, Dope Humor of the Seventies, which also collected material from the Dear Friends radio shows, was released in 2020.

== Personnel ==
- Firesign Theatre – composer, producer:
- Philip Austin
- Peter Bergman
- David Ossman
- Phil Proctor
- Phil Cross – engineer
- Bill Driml – engineer
- Vaughn "The Live Earl Jive" Filkins – engineer, Improvisation
- Anne Garner – Cover Tinting
- Bill McIntyre – Broadcast Producer
- John Rose – Photography
- Phil Yamamoto – design, Photo Tinting
