= Anythynge You Want To =

Studio album by The Firesign Theatre
- Released: 1982 (vinyl); 2001 CD
- Genre: Comedy
- Length: 57:40
- Label: Rhino Records (1982); Firesign Theatre Records (2001)
- Producer: Philip Austin

The Firesign Theatre chronology
Lawyer's Hospital (1981)	Anythynge You Want To (1982)	The Three Faces of Al (1984)

Anythynge You Want To is a 2001 CD release by the Firesign Theatre presenting an uncut version of their 1982 comedy LP album Shakespeare's Lost Comedie. It takes the form of a radio play, under the conceit of being a lost work of Shakespeare, using language, plot structure, and characters which parody Shakespeare's original works. It was originally recorded in 1980 as a program for National Public Radio's Earplay.

== Track listing ==
1. Ye Hoste (2:02)
2. Ye Prologue (1:39)
3. Acte I, Scene I. A Nawful Place, A Heathe (3:37)
4. Acte I, Scene II. A Shippe at Sea (5:16)
5. Acte I, Scene III. Ye Rampartes of Castle Pflegem (6:25)
6. Ye Hoste Againne (3:13)
7. Acte II, Scene I. Ye Wilde Beache (3:54)
8. Acte II, Scene II. Ye Closette of ye Counte (4:33)
9. Acte II, Scene III. Ye Bishopp's Celle (2:36)
10. Acte II, Scene IV. A Graveyardde (6:30)
11. Ye Hoste Yett Againne (2:54)
12. Acte III, Scene I. Ye Coronation Roome (4:30)
13. Acte III, Scene II. A Battle Fielde (2:19)
14. Acte III, Scene III. Ye Bishopp's Battle Tente (6:48)
15. Ye Credittes (1:33)

== Release history ==
- LP Firesign / Rhino Rnlp-807(Lp), Rnc-807-4, 1982, (as Shakespeare's Lost Comedie)
- CD Firesign Theatre Records (Distributed by Whirlwind Media) 2001
- CD Firesign Theatre Records / Lodestone Catatlog MSUG090 2005

== Citations and references ==
- Firezine
