= The Firesign Theatre =

American surreal comedy group

- The Firesign Theatre performing at the Magic Mushroom club in 1967: Proctor, Ossman, Bergman, Austin
- Notable work: Nick Danger; Ralph Spoilsport; George Tirebiter; Mark Time; Don't Crush That Dwarf, Hand Me the Pliers (1970); Dear Friends radio program (1970–1971); I Think We're All Bozos on This Bus (1971); Everything You Know Is Wrong (1974); Anythynge You Want To (Shakespeare's Lost Comedie) (1982, 2001); Give Me Immortality or Give Me Death (1998)

Comedy career
- Years active: 1966–1985, 1993–2012
- Medium: Radio; audio recordings; stage; film
- Genres: Surreal humor; inside humor; sketch comedy; word play; blue comedy
- Subjects: Zeitgeist; Golden age of radio; Television; Shakespeare
- Former members: Peter Bergman; Philip Proctor; Phil Austin; David Ossman
- Website: www.firesigntheatre.com

The Firesign Theatre (also known as the Firesigns) was an American surreal comedy troupe who first appeared on November 17, 1966, in a live performance on the Los Angeles radio program Radio Free Oz on station KPFK FM. They continued appearing on Radio Free Oz, which later moved to KRLA 1110 AM and then KMET FM, through February 1969. They produced fifteen record albums and a 45 rpm single under contract to Columbia Records from 1967 through 1976, and had three nationally syndicated radio programs: The Firesign Theatre Radio Hour Hour in 1970 on KPPC-FM; and Dear Friends (1970–1971) and Let's Eat! (1971–1972) on KPFK. They also appeared in front of live audiences, and continued to write, perform, and record on other labels, occasionally taking sabbaticals during which they wrote or performed solo or in smaller groups.

The Firesign Theatre was the brainchild of Peter Bergman, and all of its material was conceived, written, and performed by its members: Bergman, Philip Proctor, Phil Austin, and David Ossman. The group's name stems from astrology, because all four were born under the three "fire signs": Aries (Austin), Leo (Proctor), and Sagittarius (Bergman and Ossman). Their popularity peaked in the early 1970s and ebbed in the Reagan era. They experienced a revival and second wave of popularity in the 1990s and continued to write, record and perform until Bergman's death in 2012.

In 1997, Entertainment Weekly ranked the Firesign Theatre among the "Thirty Greatest Comedy Acts of All Time". Their 1970 album Don't Crush That Dwarf, Hand Me the Pliers was nominated in 1971 for the Hugo Award for Best Dramatic Presentation by the World Science Fiction Society, and their next album I Think We're All Bozos on This Bus received the same nomination in 1972. Later, they received nominations for the Grammy Award for Best Comedy Album for three of their albums: The Three Faces of Al (1984), Give Me Immortality or Give Me Death (1998), and Bride of Firesign (2001). In 2005, the US Library of Congress added Don't Crush That Dwarf to the National Recording Registry and called the group "the Beatles of comedy."

== Before Firesign ==
Peter Bergman and Philip Proctor met while attending Yale University in the late 1950s, where Proctor studied acting and Bergman edited the Yale comedy magazine. Bergman studied playwriting and collaborated as lyricist with Austin Pendleton in 1958 on two Yale Dramat musicals in which Proctor starred: Tom Jones, and Booth Is Back In Town.

In 1965, Bergman spent a year working in England on the BBC television program Not So Much a Programme, More a Way of Life and went to see surrealist comedian Spike Milligan in a play. Bergman went backstage and struck up a friendship with Milligan. Also that year, he saw the Beatles in concert, which gave him the inspiration to form a four-man comedy group.

On returning to the US, Bergman started a late-night listener-participation talk show, Radio Free Oz, on July 24, 1966, on listener-sponsored KPFK FM in Los Angeles, working with producers Phil Austin and David Ossman. According to Austin, the show "featured everybody who was anybody in the artistic world who passed through LA." Guests included the band Buffalo Springfield and Andy Warhol. In November, Proctor was in Los Angeles looking for acting work and watching the Sunset Strip curfew riots. When he discovered he was sitting on a newspaper photo of Bergman, he called his college buddy, who recruited him as the fourth man for his comedy group.

Bergman originally named the group the "Oz Firesign Theatre" because all four were born under the three astrological fire signs (Aries, Leo, and Sagittarius), and the group debuted on his November 17, 1966 show. Bergman had to drop "Oz" from the name after legal threats from Disney and MGM, who owned movie rights to The Wizard of Oz and other associated works.

== Radio Free Oz ==
The Firesigns initially chose an improvisational style and carried it to a level which revolutionized radio comedy. According to Proctor:

We each independently created our own material and characters and brought them together, not knowing what the others were going to pull. And it was all based on put-ons; that is, we were assuming characters that were assumed to be real by the listeners. No matter how far out we would carry a premise, if we were tied to the phones we discovered the audience would go far ahead of us. We could be as outrageous as we wanted to be and they believed us—which was astonishingly funny and interesting and terrifying to us, because it showed the power of the medium and the gullibility and vulnerability of most people.

On nights when he had no guests, Bergman would have the Firesigns come on the air and pretend (including himself) to be outrageously interesting guests. On their November 17, 1966 debut, they pretended to be the panel of an imaginary "Oz Film Festival": Bergman was film critic Peter Volta, "writing a history of world cinema one frame at a time"; Ossman was Raul Saez, maker of “thrown camera” films, who had just won a grant to roll a 70 mm film camera down the Andes Mountains; Austin was Jack Love, making "Living Room Theatre" porn films like The Nun and Blondie Pays the Rent; and Proctor was Jean-Claude Jean-Claude, creator of the "Nouvelle Nouvelle Vague Vague movement" and director of a documentary Two Weeks With Fred, which lasts a full two weeks.

By 1967, Bergman had the Firesign Theatre appear regularly on Radio Free Oz. The Firesigns were strongly influenced by the British Goon Show; Proctor, Austin, and Ossman were big fans since the NBC program Monitor broadcast Goon Show episodes in the late 1950s, and Bergman became a fan after forming the Firesigns. According to Ossman:

We all listened to The Goon Show, Peter Sellers, Spike Milligan and Harry Secombe, at various times in our lives. We heard a lot of those shows. They impressed us when we started doing radio ourselves, because they sustained characters in a really surreal and weird kind of situation for a long period of time. They were doing that show for 10 years, all the way through the 1950s. So we were just listening to them at the end. It was that madness and the ability to go anywhere and do anything and yet sustain those funny characters. So when we first did written radio, where we would sit down and write half hour skits and do them once a week, which we did in the fall of 1967, we did things that were imitative of The Goon Show and learned a lot of voices from them and such.

In the fall of 1967, the Firesign Theatre was broadcasting Sunday nights from The Magic Mushroom, in Studio City, formerly a Bob Eubanks's Cinnamon Cinder. In September 1967, they performed an adaptation of Jorge Luis Borges's short story "La Muerte y La Brujula" ("Death and the Compass") on Radio Free Oz.

In 1969, they created improvised television commercials for Jack Poet Volkswagen in Highland Park, California, with the characters of Christian Cyborg (Bergman), Coco Lewis (Proctor), Bob Chicken (Austin), and Tony Gomez (Ossman).

== Golden age ==
=== Early recording career ===
Bergman coined the term "love-in" in 1967, and he promoted the first Los Angeles Love-In, attended by 40,000 in Elysian Park, on his program. The Firesigns performed there, which led to Radio Free Oz moving to KRLA 1110 AM, which had a much wider audience than KPFK FM. This event also caught the attention of Columbia Records staff producer Gary Usher, who sensed commercial potential for the Firesign Theatre and proposed to Bergman they make a "love-In album" for Columbia. Bergman countered with a proposal for a Firesign Theatre album, and this led to a five-year recording contract with the label. Usher also used the Firesigns' audio collages on songs by The Byrds ("Draft Morning") and Sagittarius (the 45 RPM version of "Hotel Indiscreet") in 1967 and 1968.

The album was given the non sequitur title Waiting for the Electrician or Someone Like Him, from Bergman's undeveloped 1965 idea for a comic film. The Firesigns changed their improvisational style, producing tightly scripted and memorized material. According to Bergman: "There was no leader." The Firesigns always billed themselves alphabetically on their album jackets and other printed materials. "Everything was communally written, and if one person didn't agree about something, no matter how strongly the other three felt about it, it didn't go in." The resulting synergy created the feeling of a fifth Firesign; according to Austin: "It's like, suddenly there is this fifth guy that actually does the writing. We all vaguely sort of know him, and a lot of the time take credit for him." This resulted in the group inventing the name "4 or 5 Krazy Guys Publishing" to copyright their work. Their contract with Columbia, in exchange for a low royalty rate, gave them unlimited studio time, allowing them to perfect their writing and recording.

Electrician revolutionized the concept of the comedy album: it consists of four radio plays. Side one is a trilogy of pieces: starting with "Temporarily Humboldt County", a satire of the Europeans' displacement of the indigenous peoples of the Americas; followed by "W. C. Fields Forever", a satire of the 1960s hippie culture; leading into "Trente-Huit Cunegonde (Returned for Regrooving)", a projected future in which the roles of the hippie counterculture and the Establishment culture are reversed. Side two, the title track, is a stream-of-consciousness play about an American tourist (Austin) to an Eastern Bloc country, who ends up in prison and is rescued by the CIA. It was recorded in CBS's Los Angeles radio studio from which The Jack Benny Program and others had been broadcast; the original RCA microphones and sound effects devices were used. It was released in January 1968, selling a modest 12,000 copies in its first year.

The Firesigns continued to work on the radio and began performing in folk clubs such as the Ash Grove. Radio Free Oz moved again to KMET FM until February 1969. The Firesign Theatre Radio Hour Hour [sic] aired for two hours on Sunday nights on KPPC-FM in 1970. They concentrated their writing on the folk-club material and produced improvisational skit material for the Radio Hour and its successors.

The Firesigns almost lost their recording contract after their first album. According to Bergman: "Columbia was going to kick us off the label, so we scripted the next record and the old guard at Columbia took a look at the script and said 'This isn't funny—this is dirty!' And to our rescue came James William Guercio [producer of the Buckinghams] and John Hammond." Austin says, "With Hammond backing us up, CBS came around." They went on to produce three more Columbia studio albums from 1969 to 1971. Each grew technically more sophisticated, taking advantage of up to 16 tape tracks and Dolby noise reduction by 1970.

How Can You Be in Two Places at Once When You're Not Anywhere at All, released in 1969, consists of a stream-of-consciousness play on side one about a man named Babe (Bergman) who buys a car and goes on a road trip that turns into a parody of Norman Corwin's 1941 patriotic radio pageant We Hold These Truths. Side two, The Further Adventures of Nick Danger, is a parody of 1940s radio, about a hard-boiled detective (Austin) who became possibly the Firesigns' most famous character.

Don't Crush That Dwarf, Hand Me the Pliers (1970) is a single play centered around an actor named George Tirebiter (Ossman), who gradually ages into an old man while watching his old movies on television: a Henry Aldrich parody High School Madness (in which he is named Porgie Tirebiter), and the Korean War film Parallel Hell. Dwarf marked a high point in the Firesign's use of blue comedy: Porgie has explicit sex with a housemaid as creaking bedsprings are heard. This album was nominated for a Hugo Award for Best Dramatic Presentation in 1971 by the World Science Fiction Society,

Dwarf brought a level of success to the Firesigns that started to spoil them. Bergman said, "We toured after Dwarf and we began to realize the extent we were influencing people. We realized that FM radio was playing our albums whole, and that people were memorizing them." Austin said of this period, "At that point we began not to get along with each other that well, and the being taken so seriously—Rolling Stone did a long article on us, and we were being compared to James Joyce—there was a prideful attitude that took over. But we weren't making money; we might as well have been teaching school somewhere and worrying about making tenure for all the money we were making. So in some sense we didn't really understand what we were doing, which is why we were never able to make a second Dwarf, which to me is a real disappointment."

Their fourth album, I Think We're All Bozos On This Bus (1971), also a single play, centers on a young, early-technology computer hacker (Proctor) and an older "bozo" with a large nose that honks like a clown's (Austin), who attend a Disneyesque Future Fair. The blue comedy was dialed back from explicit to suggestive, as a scientist invents a machine that mimics sexual intercourse. This album also received a Hugo nomination in 1972.

Meanwhile, from September 9, 1970, to February 17, 1971, they were performing a one-hour weekly live series on KPFK, Dear Friends. These programs were recorded and then edited into slightly shorter shows and syndicated to radio stations across the country on 12" LP albums. Their fifth album, Dear Friends, was a double-record compilation of what they considered the best segments from the series, released in January 1972. Dear Friends was followed with the KPFK show Let's Eat! in 1971 and 1972. Both titles came from lines uttered by televangelist Pastor Rod Flash (Proctor) on his "Hour of Reckoning" program in Don't Crush That Dwarf.

In 1970, the group had performed a live stage show, the Shakespeare parody The Count of Monte Cristo, at Columbia University. In January 1972 they decided to expand this and retitle it Anything You Want To for their next album. On March 9, Columbia signed them to a second five-year contract. On March 30, they ended Let's Eat! with a live broadcast titled Martian Space Party, which was also recorded on 16-track tape and filmed. The Firesigns combined parts of the two shows with some new studio material to produce their sixth album, Not Insane or Anything You Want To. But before releasing the album in October 1972, they had discarded their original story line idea and some newly written scenes.

=== 1973 split ===
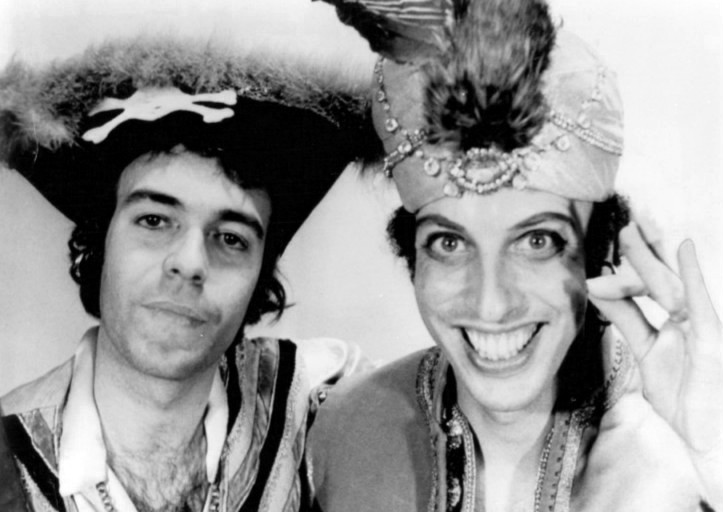
Proctor and Bergman started working as a duo in 1973 on TV or Not TV.

The Not Insane album performed poorly, and the Firesigns later claimed to be disappointed with it. In the liner notes to the group’s 1993 greatest hits album, Shoes for Industry: The Best of the Firesign Theatre, Bergman criticized Not Insane, saying it "was when the Firesign was splitting apart; it was a fractious, fragmented album." Ossman called it "a serious mistake" and said it “was incomprehensible, basically," and "it was not the album it should have been and I think that caused us to slope off rapidly in sales."

The four decided to take a break from the group in 1973 to work in separate directions. Proctor and Bergman decided to perform as a duo, and made a separate record deal with Columbia, producing TV or Not TV: A Video Vaudeville in Two Acts. The record predicts the rise of pay cable TV, and it depicts an amateur station run by two men who must constantly block a group of teenage hijackers. They turned this into a vaudeville-type show which they played on tour. While promoting the show, they did a radio interview with disk jockey Wolfman Jack.

Meanwhile, Ossman wrote a solo album, How Time Flys, based on the Mark Time astronaut character he created for a Dear Friends skit, used on I Think We're All Bozos and cut from Not Insane. He co-directed the album with Columbia producer Stephen Gillmor, and the other three Firesigns starred on it, along with several guest personalities including Wolfman Jack, Harry Shearer of The Credibility Gap, and broadcast journalist Lew Irwin. Mark returns on New Year's Eve, 1999, from a twenty-year round trip to Planet X, only to find the space program has been dismantled, and no one cares about him except for an eccentric impresario (Bergman) who kidnaps him for his video recordings of encounters with alien life.

Austin wrote the solo album Roller Maidens From Outer Space, based on a hardboiled detective in the same vein as his Nick Danger character introduced on the B side of How Can You Be In Two Places.... Roller Maidens, released in March 1974 on Columbia's Epic label, also featured all four Firesigns and included actors Richard Paul and Michael C. Gwynne. The album satirizes series television, televangelists, the 1973 oil crisis, and the presidency of Richard Nixon.

=== Comedy style ===
The Firesigns made use of inside humor. They peppered Waiting for the Electrician and How Can You Be in Two Places At Once with Beatles references not found in the band's top 40 material. Firesign characters quoted lyrics from songs such as "The Word", "I'm So Tired", and "I Am the Walrus". The name of Danger's criminal nemesis Rocky Rococo was a parody of the Beatles' "Rocky Raccoon", and Danger's girlfriend has multiple names but "everyone knew her as Nancy" just like Rocky Raccoon's girlfriend.

Later the Firesigns created their own inside jokes by referring to their own previously released material. A famous example is when a confused caller tries to order a pizza from Nick Danger; the other side of this phone conversation is portrayed in Dwarf, where George Tirebiter is the frustrated, hungry caller trying to get food delivered from "Nick's".

"He's no fun, he fell right over" became a famous catchphrase delivered by Austin in "How Can You Be In Two Places at Once" and repeated on side two in "The Further Adventures of Nick Danger". This line was repeated on the albums Not Insane and How Time Flys.

=== Reunion ===
The group reunited in late August 1973 to produce the Sherlock Holmes parody The Tale of the Giant Rat of Sumatra, based on one of the plays from their 1967 Magic Mushroom broadcasts, By the Light of the Silvery. This was released on vinyl in January 1974. The Firesigns sold this script to science fiction writer Harlan Ellison for Book Three of Ellison's anthology The Last Dangerous Visions, which Ellison never completed.

In October 1974, the Firesigns released their eighth album, Everything You Know Is Wrong, which satirized the developing New Age movement. Ossman said this record "grew out of our basic interest in those parapsychological things ... from Castaneda to the hollow Earth theory to the guy who bends spoons. Originally, when we started writing it, it was going to be a much more complicated and 'cinematic' record; we were trying to write a radio movie." The Firesigns produced a film made by Allen Daviau (who later filmed E.T. the Extra-Terrestrial) using the album as the soundtrack. The film was shown in a live appearance at Stanford University and released on VHS video tape in 1993.

In 1975, they released the black comedy album In the Next World, You're on Your Own, written by Austin and Ossman. The story centers on Random Coolzip (Proctor), an alcoholic dirty cop whose son (Bergman) is a by-the-book cop, whose daughter (Proctor) is a porn actress, and whose police dispatcher wife (Ossman) lives in a soap opera. In a parody of Marlon Brando's 1973 Academy Awards protest, the brother and sister stage a terrorist attack on an Oscar awards ceremony. This album, like Not Insane, also sold poorly, and Columbia declined to offer them a third contract in 1976. This time, the Firesigns didn't protest. Bergman said, "The group had really split apart; we had just burned out. I mean it was five years non-stop work. We would stop one album and start writing the next. Frankly, we didn't have five more albums in us at that point."

=== Second split ===
As Austin looked back on this period from September 1993, he wrote that he saw Proctor and Bergman wanting to take the Firesign Theatre in a different direction than he did, moving away from intensely written albums released one per year, to more live performances with lighter material. Proctor and Bergman turned their attention in 1975 to producing a live show recorded on the Columbia album What This Country Needs, based in part on material from TV or Not TV and named for a song added to the show.

The Firesign Theatre closed out their Columbia Records contract with a greatest-hits compilation Forward Into the Past in 1976. This title came from the A side of a 45 RPM single originally released in November 1969. This track and its B side, "Station Break", were included on the 1976 album. Meanwhile, Austin and Ossman toured the west coast, billing themselves as "Dr. Firesign's Theatre of Mystery". They produced a live stage show Radio Laffs of 1940, which included a second episode of the private eye character Nick Danger, "School For Actors"; and a soap opera "Over the Edge". This was performed at the Los Feliz Theatre in Los Angeles in May 1976 and at the Palace of Fine Arts in San Francisco in June. Austin wrote in 1993 that this tour "was meant to be an antidote to confusion but ... had not turned out to be much fun at all".

The Firesigns took it easy for the rest of the 1970s, producing a 1977 album Just Folks... A Firesign Chat based largely on unreleased Dear Friends and Let's Eat radio material. Proctor and Bergman appeared as regulars on a 1977 summer replacement TV series hosted by the Starland Vocal Band. Proctor and Bergman gave up their road performances after witnessing the September 4, 1977 Golden Dragon Massacre, and in 1978 released another studio album Give Us a Break, which lampooned radio and television. The Starland Vocal Band also performed short comic radio breaks on this album.

Norman Lear and Bud Yorkin's Tandem Productions bought the rights to Nick Danger for a TV series to star George Hamilton; and in 1978, New Line Cinema began negotiations to make a movie starring Chevy Chase. Both projects ended in development hell, and rights to the character reverted to the Firesigns. In December 1978, they began writing five short (2:24) episodes of Nick Danger: The Case of the Missing Shoe for a possible syndicated daily radio series. When the syndication went unsold, Austin approached Rhino Records and secured a deal to release the five episodes in 1979 on a 12-minute extended play (EP) record.

Meanwhile, Proctor and Bergman produced a film, J-Men Forever, using clips from old Republic Pictures movie serials with dubbed dialogue, combined with new footage of them as FBI agents tracking down a villain known as "the Lightning Bug" voiced by disk jockey M. G. Kelly. This became popular on the 1980s late-night TV series Night Flight.

Austin called Bergman in late 1979 to make peace and reunite the Firesigns. This resulted in a series of shows performed at the Roxy Theatre in Los Angeles: "The Owl and the Octopus Show"; "The Joey Demographico Show"; "Nick Danger: Men in Hats"; and "Welcome to Billville". These included songs with music written by Austin, and were recorded; the live recordings were used to produce their last album of the decade, the 1980 Fighting Clowns. They also produced a show, "Presidents in Hell" (FDR, Truman, Eisenhower, and Nixon), which was not recorded.

== Reagan era ==
... there was something about the Eighties – the anti-surrealist politics of the Eighties – that was wrong for the Firesign Theatre. — David Ossman

The popularity of the group cooled off after 1980 as the social and political climate of the United States changed with the election of President Ronald Reagan. In 1982, they produced the album Lawyer's Hospital from a collection of live appearances, National Public Radio (NPR) performances, and the Jack Poet Volkswagen commercials from Radio Free Oz. They also expanded their 1972 Shakespeare parody into a road show, Shakespeare's Lost Comedie and released it on a 1982 vinyl LP, which required editing down; it was re-released uncut on CD in 2001, retitled Anythynge You Want To.

Ossman left the group in early 1982 to take a producer's job for NPR in Washington, DC. The remaining three Firesigns produced a new album in 1984, The Three Faces of Al, with the further adventures of Nick Danger. This received a nomination for the Grammy Award for Best Comedy Album, and was followed in 1985 with the album Eat or Be Eaten, about a character trapped in an interactive video game.

In 1988, Austin was signed by John Dryden to produce over 50 short Nick Danger pieces for his radio satire show The Daily Feed. These were published on cassette tape as The Daily Feed Tapes, and later formed the basis for a 1995 book authored by Austin, Tales of the Old Detective and Other Big Fat Lies.

In the summer of 1990, NPR producer Ted Bonnitt called Proctor and asked him if he wanted to contribute some comedy material to Bonnitt's nightly program HEAT with John Hockenberry. Proctor called Bergman, and the duo agreed to write and perform a serial consisting of 13 five-minute episodes, Power: Life on the Edge in L.A.

== 1990s revival ==
I dreamed it back. Sure enough, when we kicked the fascists out of office it was time for the Firesign Theatre to come back. — Peter Bergman

Following the 1992 United States presidential election, and with Ossman back in the group, the Firesign Theatre reunited in 1993 for a 25th anniversary reunion tour around the US, Back From the Shadows, starting on April 24 in Seattle with an audience of 2,900. The title was taken from a parody of the Gene Autry song "Back in the Saddle Again", which they wrote for I Think We're All Bozos on This Bus. The tour, consisting of live performances of material adapted from their first four Golden Age albums (Electrician, Two Places At Once, Dwarf, and Bozos), was recorded on CD and a DVD video released in 1994. They also released a 1993 greatest hits album, Shoes for Industry: The Best of the Firesign Theatre containing original material from the first nine albums, TV or Not TV, and Roller Maidens From Outer Space.

In 1996, Bergman revived Radio Free Oz as an Internet-based radio station, www.rfo.net, calling it "the Internet's funny bone."

The Firesigns followed this with the 1998 album Pink Hotel Burns Down, a collection of material from two 1967 Magic Mushroom broadcasts, Exorcism In Your Daily Life and their early Sherlock Holmes parody "By the Light of the Silvery"; two cuts, "The Pink Hotel" and "The Sand Bar" from their video game record that eventually became Eat or Be Eaten; the soap opera "Over the Edge" from Austin and Ossman's 1976 Dr. Firesign's Theatre of Mystery tour, and several clips from their radio work, including the earliest recorded appearance on Radio Free Oz.

The Firesigns satirized the turn-of-the-millennium Y2K scare with the 1998 album Give Me Immortality or Give Me Death, in which they revived some of their classic characters such as used car salesman Ralph Spoilsport (Proctor) from How Can You Be In Two Places At Once, news reporters Harold Hiphugger (Ossman) and Ray Hamberger (Proctor) from Everything You Know Is Wrong, and game-show contestant Caroline Presskey (Proctor) from Don't Crush That Dwarf. This earned them their second Grammy nomination, and they developed it into a "millennium trilogy" with the 1999 Boom Dot Bust and 2001 Bride of Firesign, which received a third Grammy nomination. Boom Dot Bust used material from their 1979 Roxy show "Welcome to Billville".

== 21st century ==
They created a live show, Radio Now Live in 2001 using characters from Give Me Immortality and released it on a live album, which also includes updated cuts from Anythynge You Want To.

In December 2001, the Firesigns appeared in a 90-minute PBS television show Weirdly Cool. This contained live, updated performance material based on Waiting for the Electrician, How Can You Be in Two Places..., and Don't Crush That Dwarf; and included interviews and two Jack Poet Volkswagen commercials.

From November 2002 through early 2003, Bergman produced a political satire series True Confessions of the Real World, three times weekly on Pasadena non-commercial KPCC FM. He scripted fake interviews with imaginary "newsmakers".

The Firesigns appeared on the NPR show All Things Considered on US holidays from July 4 to December 31, 2002; these were compiled on a CD, All Things Firesign. They also appeared for President's Day on February 17, 2003, and Saint Patrick's Day on March 17, 2003.

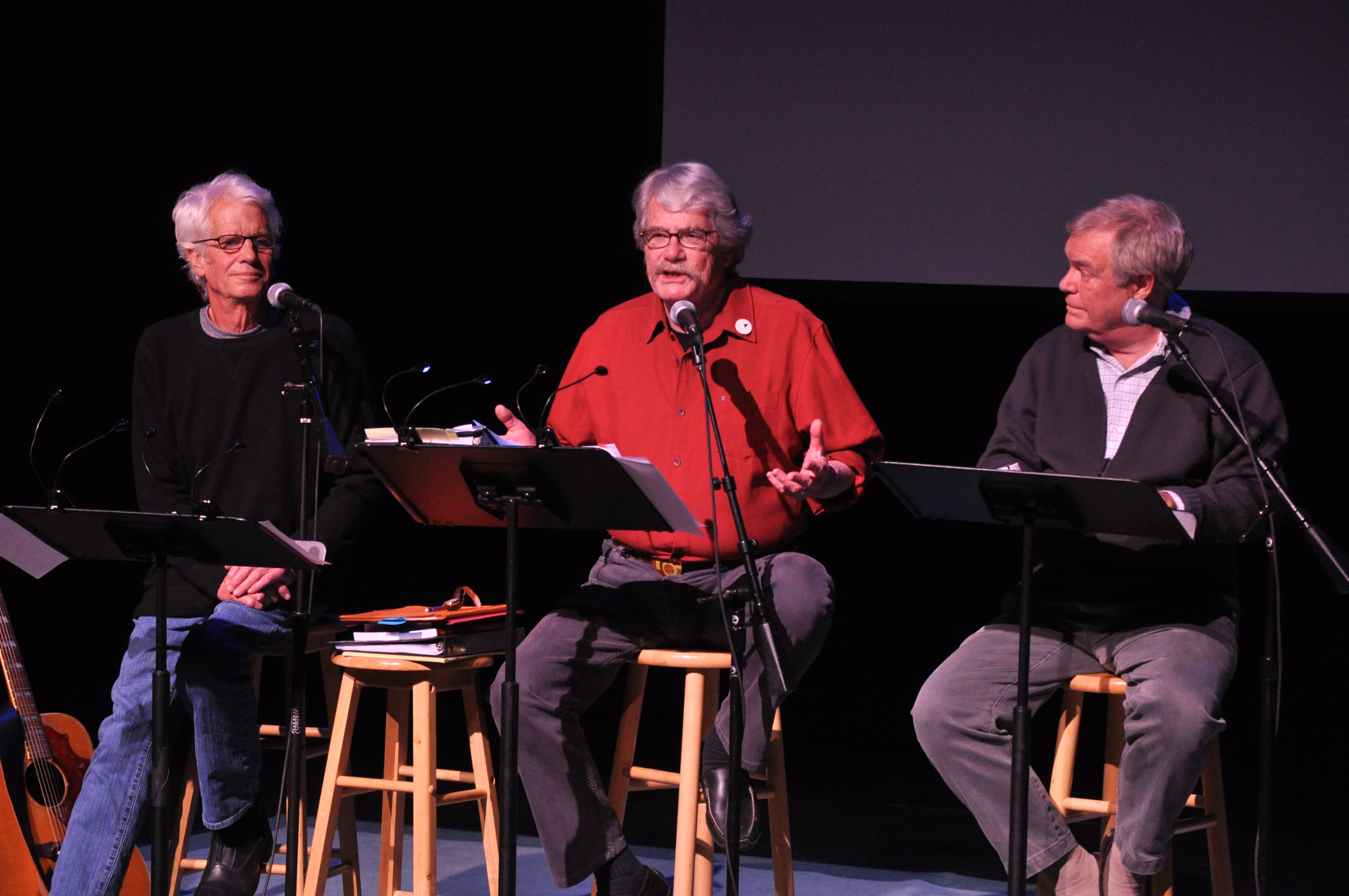
Austin, Ossman, and Proctor pay tribute to Peter Bergman on April 21, 2012.

In 2008, they released a four-CD boxed set The Firesign Theatre's Box of Danger, compiling most material which featured their most famous character, Nick Danger, including a bootleg recording of a 1976 live performance.

Their penultimate album was the 2010 Duke of Madness Motors: The Complete "Dear Friends" Radio Era, a combination book and data DVD comprising a complete compilation, totaling over 80 hours, of their 1970s radio shows Firesign Theatre Radio Hour Hour, Dear Friends, and Let's Eat (the last two in both original broadcast, and syndication-edited form). Their last live performance as a quartet was on December 10, 2011 in Portland, Oregon. They could claim to be the longest surviving group from the "classic rock" era to still be intact with the original members (45 years).

Bergman died in a Santa Monica hospital on March 9, 2012, from complications of leukemia. According to Austin, the remaining three Firesigns' April 21, 2012, memorial for Bergman was their last live performance. Austin died in Fox Island, Washington, on June 18, 2015, from complications of cancer.

A compilation album distilled from the Duke of Madness Motors set, Dope Humor of the Seventies, was released by Stand Up! Records in November 2020. The title is another Firesign inside joke: it was first used in 1972 for a fictional album hawked by Austin as "Dexter Fogg" in Martian Space Party (heard on Not Insane). Ossman called Dope Humor a sort of "dark side" to the Dear Friends album, since both were compiled from the same source, but the sketches on Dope Humor had not been constrained by the desire to keep the material radio-friendly, as had been the case for Dear Friends. Proctor called the release a tribute to Austin and Bergman.

== Firesign members ==
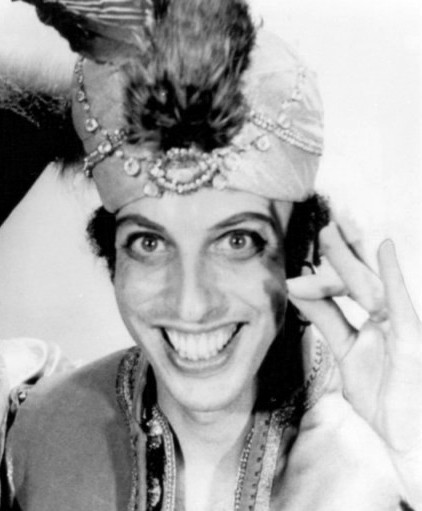

Peter Bergman (born under the fire sign Sagittarius in Cleveland, Ohio, on November 29, 1939; died March 9, 2012) started his radio career on his high school radio system during the Korean War. He was kicked off the air by the principal when, as a prank, he announced a Communist takeover of the school. He studied economics at Yale (class of 1961) and was managing editor of the university's comedy magazine. In his second graduate year he became a fellow in playwriting. As a member of the Yale Dramatic Association, he co-wrote two musical comedies with Austin Pendleton. Later, he considered attending medical school and helped produce a machine for viewing angiocardiograms and measuring blockage of the arteries of the heart. He had a deep voice and frequently took African-American roles in Firesign Theatre and Proctor and Bergman works.

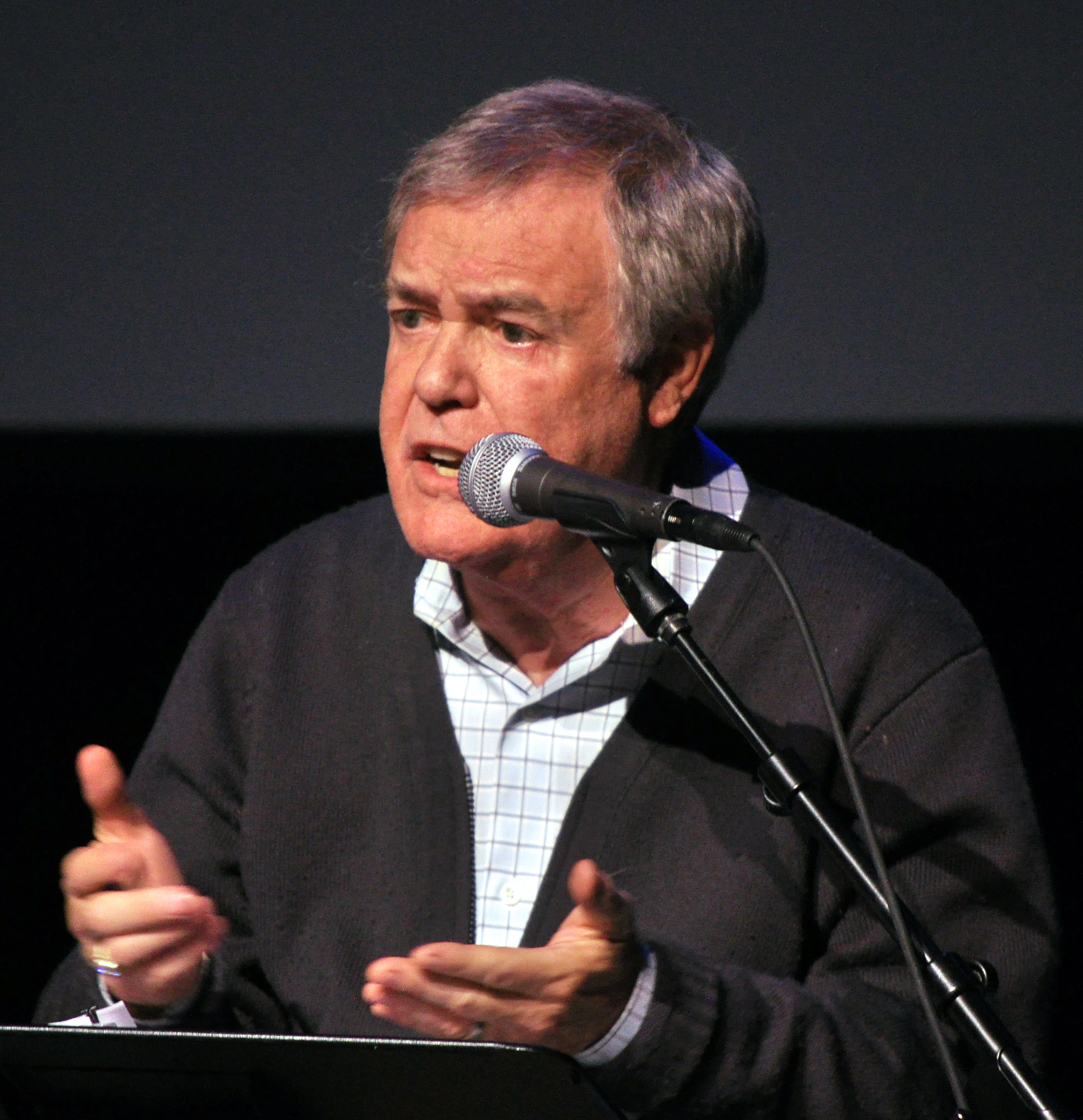

Philip Proctor (born under the fire sign Leo in Goshen, Indiana, on July 28, 1940) was a boy soprano in a children's choir and studied acting at Yale. There, he met his future partner Bergman in the Yale Dramatic Association, where he starred in the two musical comedies written by Bergman and Pendleton. He became a professional actor, with a role on the soap opera The Edge of Night, before contacting Bergman and joining him on Radio Free Oz in 1966. Proctor's adult tenor voice enables him to do a convincing female voice without using falsetto; therefore he usually did most of the female roles in the Firesign Theatre and Proctor and Bergman works, though the other three Firesigns occasionally did female voices. He also has done celebrity voice impersonations on Firesign material, including W. C. Fields (Waiting For the Electrician and How Can You Be In Two Places...), Robert F. Kennedy (Waiting For the Electrician), and a Peter Lorre-like voice for the Nick Danger character Rocky Rococo (Box of Danger). Proctor has also acted and appeared as a voice actor on many television shows and several feature films.

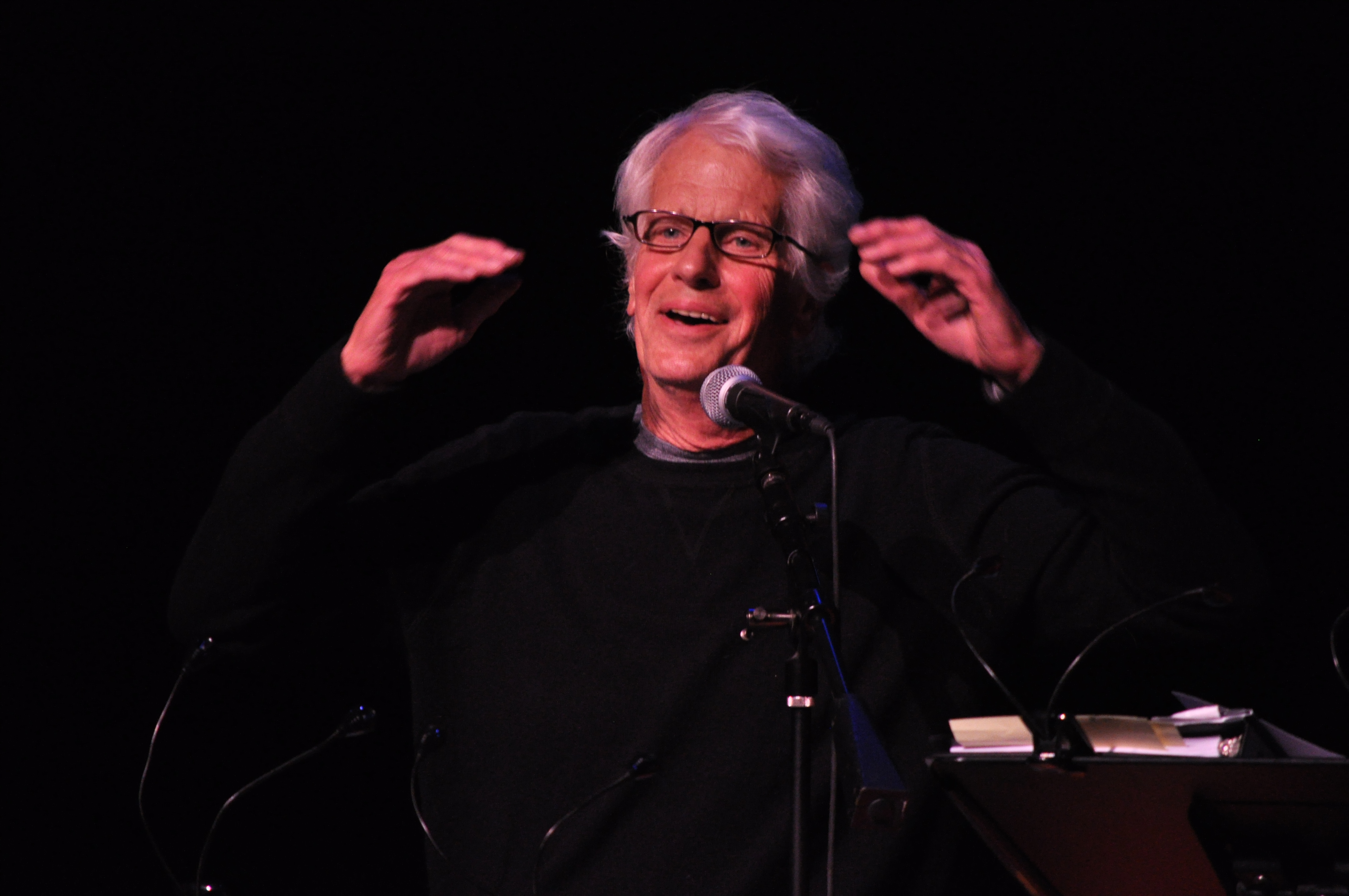

Phil Austin (born under the fire sign Aries in Denver, Colorado, on April 6, 1941; died June 18, 2015), was the youngest Firesign. He attended college but never graduated. He was an accomplished lead guitarist, and he was responsible for adding much of the music to Firesign works. He also appeared as an actor and voice actor on television. He used his natural, sonorous baritone voice for Nick Danger, but affected a phony Japanese accent for his "Young Guy, Motor Detective" self-parody of Danger in Not Insane and a stereotypical, tough-guy voice and accent for the similar hardboiled detective Dick Private in Roller Maidens From Outer Space. He also could do an old-man voice as Doc Technical in the Dear Friends radio "Mark Time" episode, and he applied his impersonation of Richard Nixon as presidents in several Firesign and solo works (Bozos, How Time Flys, Roller Maidens, and Everything You Know Is Wrong). He also did an Elvis Presley impersonation singing the news in the Roller Maidens track "The Bad News".

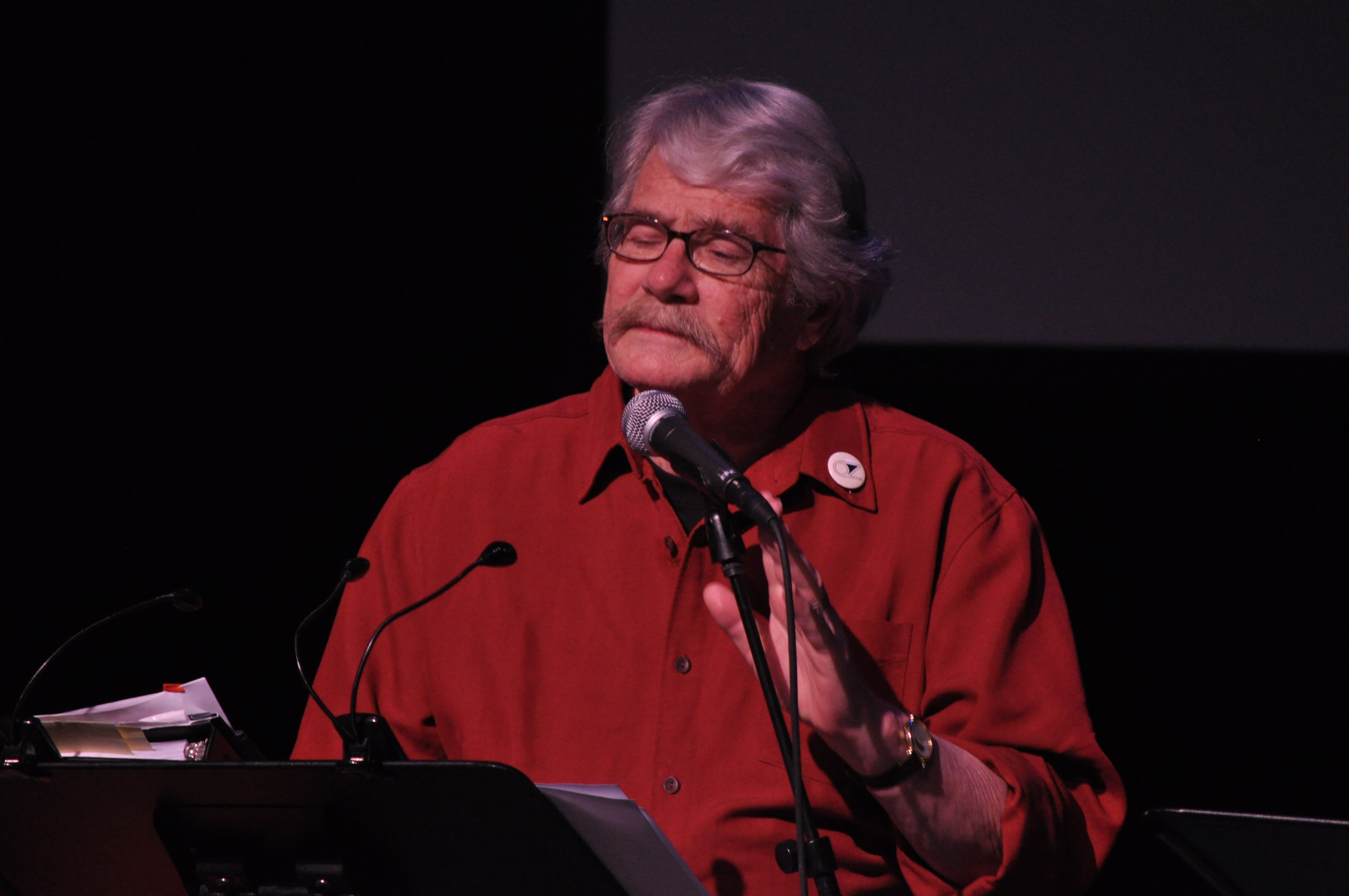

David Ossman (born under the fire sign Sagittarius in Santa Monica, California, on December 6, 1936), the oldest Firesign, is known as the intellectual of the group, and he is known for doing an old-man voice (most famously as Catherwood the butler in the original Nick Danger story, George Tirebiter on Don't Crush That Dwarf and In the Next World You're On Your Own, and as the elder ant Cornelius in Disney Pixar's 1998 A Bug's Life.) He used his natural voice as astronaut Mark Time and newsman Harold Hiphugger. Outside of the Firesign Theatre, he has performed several voices on The Tick animated TV series and worked extensively as a producer and on-air narrator on National Public Radio and several affiliated stations.

=== Associate Firesigns ===
Several people have been accorded unofficial "associate Firesign" status over the years, by virtue of performing on several records with the group.

Austin's first wife Annalee performed in support of the group on several golden age albums. She is credited as a member of "the St. Louis Aquarium Choraleers" (singing the hymn "Marching to Shibboleth") and as "the Wake-Up Lady" and for birdsong on Don't Crush That Dwarf; as "Mickey" and with keyboard stylings on I Think We're All Bozos; with film footage on the Dear Friends album; and organ, piano, and vocals on Not Insane.

Ossman's first wife Tiny (Tinika) performed as a St. Louis Aquarium Choraleer and as part of the "Ambient's Noyes Choral" (singing the Peorgie and Mudhead theme song) on Don't Crush That Dwarf; as "Ann" on I Think We're All Bozos; as Nurse Angela and news reporter Chiquita Bandana on How Time Flys; and vocals and percussion on Not Insane. She and Ossman co-hosted a Sunday night radio program of pre–World War II music on KTYD.

Austin married his second wife Oona née Elliott in 1971. She is credited as an anonymous extra in I Think We're All Bozos; was photographed as one of the Roller Maidens From Outer Space and sang backup vocals for the Austin solo album; and appeared as a Reebus Caneebus groupie in the film version of Everything You Know Is Wrong. She is the model for the blonde femme fatale on the cover art of the Box of Danger CD set, and is credited with performing support functions such as photography and catering on several of the later albums.

Proctor's third wife, actress Melinda Peterson, appeared with Proctor and Bergman on their 1990 NPR serial Power: Life on the Edge in L.A.. She also performed on the Give Me Immortality ..., Boom Dot Bust, and Bride of Firesign albums and supported the group in the Radio Now Live show.

== Cultural influence ==
In 1997, Entertainment Weekly ranked the Firesign Theatre among the "Thirty Greatest Comedy Acts of All Time". In 2005, the US Library of Congress added Don't Crush That Dwarf, Hand Me the Pliers to the National Recording Registry, and called the group "the Beatles of comedy."

Comedians George Carlin, Robin Williams, and John Goodman enjoyed the Firesigns' comedy and lent their comments to the 2001 PBS television special Weirdly Cool. Williams referred to Firesign albums as "the audio equivalent of a Hieronymus Bosch painting."

Beatle John Lennon was photographed wearing the Firesign's "Not Insane – Papoon for President" campaign button they had made for Martian Space Party (Not Insane album).

Musical satirist "Weird Al" Yankovic paid homage to the Firesigns by giving the title "Everything You Know Is Wrong" to an original song on his 1996 album Bad Hair Day.

Steve Jobs paid homage to the Firesigns' I Think We're All Bozos album by programming an "Easter egg" in Apple's Siri intelligent personal assistant. Siri responds to the prompt "This is worker speaking. Hello" with "Hello Ah-Clem. What function can I perform for you? LOL".

On several occurrences of the Association for Consciousness Exploration (ACE)'s Starwood Festival, director Jeff Rosenbaum has organized performances of Firesign Theatre radio plays performed by organizers and guest speakers of the event under the name "Firesign Clones".

=== Copyright infringement ===
In Madison, Wisconsin, in 1974, a pair of University of Illinois students opened the first of a regional chain of pizza restaurants they named "Rocky Rococo" after the Nick Danger character, without any mention of connection to the Firesign Theatre. They hired an artist to design, as their logo, a moustachioed Italian with a white hat and sunglasses, suggested by the White Spy from Mad Magazine, and hired comic actor Jim Pederson to portray this "Rocky Rococo" wearing a white suit.

The Firesigns visited the first Rocky Rococo Pizza when on tour in Madison in 1975 and reacted with good humor, joking around with the owners and giving them pictures that said, "To Rocky, from Rocky" which were hung on the wall. But in 1985, by which time the chain had grown to 62 restaurants and the Firesigns had passed their "golden age", they sent the owners a letter claiming ownership of the name. The pizza chain's lawyers found a similar case where an Austin, Texas pizzeria named Conan's ran afoul of the copyright owners, producers of the 1982 film Conan the Barbarian. Since the creator of the Conan the Barbarian comic had similarly endorsed the restaurant by drawing Conan on its walls, the suit lost in the United States Court of Appeals for the Fifth Circuit, so the Firesigns settled out of court.

=== Mark Time awards ===
Ossman and his second wife Judith Walcutt formed Otherworld Media Productions in 1985 to produce audio theatre. They created an annual "Mark Time award" for best radio science fiction, named after Ossman's astronaut character. In 2015, they added three new awards named after Firesign Theatre characters:

- Nick Danger prize for best mystery/detective fiction
- The Bradshaw prize (after Bergman's cop character) for "service to the field"
- The Betty Jo (But Everyone Knew Her as Nancy) prize, judged by Phil Proctor and his wife, for best "multi-gender" vocal performance

== Media ==
=== Radio ===
- Radio Free Oz (1966–1969)
- The Firesign Theatre Radio Hour Hour (1970)
- Dear Friends (1970–1971)

Syndicated

- Let's Eat (1971–1972)

Syndicated

- A Firesign Chat with Papoon (1972 Columbia)
- The Proctor-Bergman Report (1977–1978)
- The Cassette Chronicles (1980 Rhino Entertainment)

A six-cassette collection of the Firesign Theatre's presidential and campaign commentaries which aired on NPR during the 1980 election season.

- Daily Feed 1988 Newsreel – The Daily Feed (1988, DC Audio)

A solo cassette by Austin

- A Capital Decade Daily Feed 1989 Newsreel – The Daily Feed (1989 DC Audio)

A solo cassette by Austin

- Power: Life on the Edge in L.A. (summer 1990)

Proctor and Bergman on NPR's Heat with John Hockenberry

- True Confessions of the Real World (November 2001 – 2002)

Peter Bergman's commentary and interviews with imaginary "news makers" on KPCC

- All Things Considered (July 2002 – March 2003)

Ten appearances on NPR

=== Podcast ===
- Radio Free Oz Podcast (2010–2012)

=== Albums ===
- Waiting for the Electrician or Someone Like Him (1968, Columbia Records)
- How Can You Be in Two Places at Once When You're Not Anywhere at All (1969, Columbia)
- Don't Crush That Dwarf, Hand Me the Pliers (1970, Columbia)
- I Think We're All Bozos on This Bus (1971, Columbia)
- Dear Friends (1972, Columbia)
- Not Insane or Anything You Want To (1972, Columbia)
- The Tale of the Giant Rat of Sumatra (1974, Columbia)
- Everything You Know Is Wrong (1974, Columbia)
- In the Next World, You're on Your Own (1975, Columbia)
- Forward Into the Past (1976, Columbia) Compilation, includes 1969 singles
- Just Folks . . . A Firesign Chat (1977, Butterfly Records)
- Nick Danger: The Case of the Missing Shoe (1979, Rhino Records EP)
- Fighting Clowns (1980, Rhino)
- Lawyer's Hospital (1982, Rhino)
- Shakespeare's Lost Comedie (1982, Rhino) (re-released 2001 in expanded edition as Anythynge You Want To)
- The Three Faces of Al (1984, Rhino, without David Ossman)
- Eat or Be Eaten (1985, Mercury Records, without David Ossman)
- Shoes for Industry: The Best of the Firesign Theatre (1993, Sony Records)
- Back From the Shadows: The Firesign Theatre's 25th Anniversary Reunion Tour (1994, Mobile Fidelity Sound Lab)
- Pink Hotel Burns Down (1998, LodeStone Media)
- Give Me Immortality or Give Me Death (1998, Rhino) We're Doomed trilogy
- Boom Dot Bust (1999, Rhino) We're Doomed trilogy
- Bride of Firesign (2001, Rhino) We're Doomed trilogy
- Radio Now Live (2001, Whirlwind Media)
- Papoon for President (2002, Laugh.Com)
- All Things Firesign (2003, Artemis Records)
- The Firesign Theatre's Box of Danger (2008, Shout! Factory)
- Duke of Madness Motors: The Complete "Dear Friends" Radio Era (book and data DVD of radio program recordings, over 80 hours) (2010, Seeland Records)
- Dope Humor of the Seventies (Stand Up! Records, 2020)

==== Solo albums ====
- TV or Not TV (1973, Columbia) Proctor and Bergman
- How Time Flys (1973, Columbia) Written and co-directed by Ossman, including all Firesign members plus a cast of guest stars
- Roller Maidens From Outer Space (1974, Epic Records) Written and directed by Austin, including all Firesign members plus a cast of extras
- What This Country Needs (1975, Columbia) Proctor and Bergman live, based on material from TV or Not TV
- Give Us a Break (1978, Mercury Records) Proctor and Bergman
- Nick Danger: The Daily Feed Tapes (1988-1990, Austin)
- Down Under Danger (1994, Sparks Media) a solo cassette by Austin
- David Ossman's Time Capsules (1996, Otherworld Media) a solo cassette by Ossman
- George Tirebiter's Radio Follies (1997, Twin Cities Radio Theatre Workshop) a solo cassette by Ossman

=== Films ===
- Zachariah (co-written by Firesign Theatre) (92 min., 1971) Comedy western, inspired by the Hermann Hesse novel Siddhartha
- Martian Space Party (Firesign Theatre with Campoon workers) (27 min., 1972)
- Love is Hard to Get (Peter Bergman) (26 min., 1973)
- Let's Visit the World of the Future (44 min., 1973) based on characters from I Think We're All Bozos on This Bus, directed by Ivan Stang
- Six Dreams (Peter Bergman - executive producer, Phil Proctor) (13 min., 1976)
- Tunnel Vision (featuring Phil Proctor) (70 min., 1976)
- Everything You Know is Wrong (40 min., 1978) lip-synch to the album
- TV or Not TV (33 min., 1978) based on the Proctor and Bergman album
- Americathon (86 min., 1979) based on a sketch created by Proctor and Bergman
- J-Men Forever (75 min., 1979) Proctor and Bergman; compilation of Republic Science Fiction serial clips with new dialogue overdubbed
- The Madhouse of Dr. Fear (60 min., 1979)
- Nick Danger in The Case of the Missing Yolk (60 min., 1983) Originally an Interactive Video, Pacific Arts PAVR-527; broadcast on the USA Network series Night Flight
- Eat or be Eaten (30 min., 1985) Austin, Bergman, and Proctor, RCA Columbia 60566
- Hot Shorts (73 min., 1985) Austin, Bergman, and Proctor, RCA Columbia 60435
- Back From the Shadows: The Firesign Theatre's 25th Anniversary Reunion Show (1994)
- Firesign Theatre Weirdly Cool DVD Movie (2001)
- Just Folks: Live at the Roxy (2018), S'More Entertainment; live performances (1974-1981)

=== Books ===
Straight Arrow Press, Rolling Stone's book publishing arm, published two books authored by the Firesign Theatre: The Firesign Theatre's Big Book of Plays, and The Firesign Theatre's Big Mystery Joke Book. These feature background information, satirical introductions and parodic histories, as well as transcripts from their first seven albums.

- Exorcism In Your Daily Life: The Psychedelic Firesign Theatre at the Magic Mushroom. 1967
- Profiles in Barbecue Sauce: The Psychedelic Firesign Theatre On Stage. 1970
- The Firesign Theatre's Big Book Of Plays. San Francisco: Straight Arrow, 1972.
- The Firesign Theatre's Big Mystery Joke Book. San Francisco: Straight Arrow, 1974.
- The Apocalypse Papers, a Fiction by The Firesign Theatre. Topeka: Apocalypse Press, 1976. Limited edition, 500 copies
- George Tirebiter's Radiodaze (1989 Sparks Media) a solo cassette by Ossman
- The George Tirebiter Story Chapter 1: Another Christmas Carol (1989, Sparks Media) by Ossman
- The George Tirebiter Story Pt.2 Mexican Overdrive / Radiodaze (1989 Company One) by Ossman
- The George Tirebiter Story Pt.3 The Ronald Reagan Murder Case (1990 Midwest Radio Theatre Workshop) by Ossman
- Tales Of The Old Detective And Other Big Fat Lies (1995) by Austin
- The Ronald Reagan Murder Case: A George Tirebiter Mystery by Ossman. (Albany: BearManor Media) (2006) ISBN 1-59393-071-2
- Dr. Firesign's Follies: Radio, Comedy, Mystery, History by Ossman. (Albany: BearManor Media) (2008) ISBN 978-1-59393-148-3
- Marching to Shibboleth (Download Edition, firesigntheatre.com) reproduces both of Firesign's Big Books, originally published in 1972 and 1974 by Straight Arrow; the original paperback edition (BearManor Media) is out of print
- Dr. Firesign's Perpetual Almanack 1970-1981 (PDF download, firesigntheatre.com) features Firesign’s long out-of-print self-publications: The Mixville Rocket & Sun-Duck, The Apocalypse Papers, The Young Tom Edison Club’s Edison Electric Journal & Firesign Times, and Bozobook; plus the Firesign sections from Crawdaddy! magazine.

=== Games ===
- In 1983 Mattel released two Intellivision video games with Intellivoice: Bomb Squad, with Proctor as the voice of Frank and Bergman as the voice of Boris; and B-17 Bomber, with Proctor as the voice of the Pilot and Austin as the Bombardier.
- In 1996, a computer game written by Bergman, Pyst, a parody of the game Myst, was released by Parroty Interactive.

== See also ==
- Old time radio
