= Dear Friends (radio program) =

US live radio program performed by the Firesign Theatre on KPFK radio in Los Angeles

- Genre: Comedy
- Running time: 45 minutes (approx.)
- Country of origin: United States
- Language: English
- Home station: KPFK Los Angeles
- Starring: The Firesign Theatre: Peter Bergman, Philip Proctor, Phil Austin, David Ossman
- Written by: The Firesign Theatre
- Produced by: Bill McIntyre
- Original release: September 16, 1970 – February 17, 1971
- No. of episodes: 21
- Audio format: Stereophonic sound

Dear Friends was a live radio program performed by the Firesign Theatre on KPFK radio in Los Angeles. Twenty-one episodes aired between September 16, 1970 and February 17, 1971. These programs were recorded and later edited into one-hour shows distributed on 12" LPs for national syndication. In January 1972, the group released a Dear Friends double album, a compilation of what they considered to be the best segments from the radio program. The original broadcasts were released in 2010 on the group's Duke of Madness Motors DVD compilation. Another album distilled from the Duke of Madness Motors set, Dope Humor of the Seventies, which also collected material from the Dear Friends radio shows, was released in 2020.

== Episodes ==
=== Episode #1 – Live At The Ash Grove ===
Originally aired live on KPFK on November 15, 1970

==== Tracks – side one ====
Intros

1. P.B. Intros Freddy Earth
2. Vegetables
3. Dr. Memory
4. Animals
5. Tongue Exercises (P.P.)
6. Religious Items
7. Whales
8. Rap On Cartoon Men Dagwood & Jigs
9. Segue > Drunks
10. Arms
11. Letter From Tokyo
12. American Koan
13. Egyptians (P.B.)
14. Skeleton
15. Pirates
16. F.T. Anniversary
17. Joke Contest
18. P.B.'S Close
19. Last Chord Of Music

==== Tracks – side two ====
1. Shaky Open
2. Music Break (Silhouettes)
3. Applause
4. P.P. Bit
5. Hole Earth Estates
6. Teenie Weenies
7. Animals
8. Vaudeville Act
9. Georgia Island Story
10. Don G. O'vanni Spot (40 Great Unclaimed Melodies)
11. Thanksgiving Piece (The P.A. Encore)
12. Leary-Duck
13. President's Names Rap
14. Thank You

=== Episode #2 – Power Is Trouble and Trouble's Not Funny ===
Originally aired live on KPFK on November 1, 1970

==== Tracks – side one ====
1. Satie Opening
2. Animals In Army
3. Glaubner's Disease
4. Dr. Spitz and Dog
5. Commerce
6. Dying Pig
7. Party Lecture
8. Dr. Memory Show
9. Citizen X Reviews Firesign Theatre Album
10. Giant Toad
11. Mark Time
12. Mission Inn
13. Early Farming
14. P.A. – P.B. Coal
15. D.O. Coal
16. Coal Improv
17. Moon Worms
18. Amoeba To Oil
19. P.P. Speech

==== Tracks – side two ====
1. Duck
2. Winter
3. BBQ Chanters
4. Police Records
5. Leg O Crow
6. "What's So Funny" Jokes
7. Willie Sutton
8. Morning T.V. Guide
9. D.O. Book Report
10. P.B. -P.A. On Book Reports
11. Questions For Kids
12. Presidents
13. Names
14. P.P. Announcement
15. Harmonica Solo
16. More Kids Questions
17. News Items
18. P.A. Reading
19. D.O. Whole Earth Poem
20. Indian Land
21. Power
22. Fanfare

=== Episode #3 – I Could Always Shoot Him With The Camera ===
Originally aired live on KPFK on October 4, 1970

==== Tracks – side one ====
1. Equipment Trouble
2. Japanese Miniature T.V.S
3. Surrogate Mothers
4. Hair
5. Drunks
6. President and Committee (Live From The Senate Bar)
7. The Greening Of America Discussion

==== Tracks – side two ====
1. Orson Welles Bit
2. Punter's Girls
3. Sound Effects War
4. Fresh Chef
5. Sex Jail
6. Sex Movies
7. W.C. Fields
8. FDR And Hitler
9. P.P.'S The Mutt and Smutt Show

=== Episode #4 – Somebody Put A Mickey In The Ground Zero ===
Originally aired live on KPFK on October 11, 1970

==== Tracks – side one ====
1. Yale Distorts Tape – 8:15
2. Conk's Coal Ad
3. Rocket Scientists's Lunch
4. "Chucko"
5. News Items: Sophia Loren, Fires, Agnew
6. Famous Comic's School
7. Child And Models At Mott's Miniatures
8. Can You Stop This

==== Tracks – side two ====
1. Hitler
2. Opinion Research
3. The Chinchilla Show
4. Real America Items
5. Mixville Rocket News
6. Spud Commercial
7. Disaster Reports
8. Rocket-Fags
9. Us Census
10. Crabs(?)
11. Writer's School Spot
12. Mutt and Smutt
13. Music Bit
14. The Compromise ATC
15. Warning
16. Blast-Off

=== Episode #5 – All We Have To Fear Is Me ===
Originally aired live on KPFK on December 9, 1970

==== Tracks – side one ====
1. D.O. Intro
2. Toad Away Hymn
3. Book Of Punter
4. Sermonizing
5. "They Heard Us Talking"
6. Pudy Valee
7. President's Songs
8. Lomesome Beet Song(O:14)
9. Navy Dress Regs
10. Heaves Of Hoove
11. P.P. As FBI Agent
12. P.B. Kicks On Nix
13. Music Break
14. D.O. – Ad Billboard
15. P.P. Zen Story
16. P.B. Andalusion Dog
17. P.P. Poem
18. Ufos
19. Sodom And Jubalee
20. 2 Idiots For Peace
21. Pauser's Manifesto
22. Dr. Tim In Algeria
23. Youthful Folly

==== Tracks – side two ====
1. D.O. Luie's Ad
2. P.P. Pavlov's Dog
3. Pooche's Beer Hall
4. Afternoon T.V. Guide
5. Watching T.V.
6. I Am An American
7. Luci and Desi
8. C.B. Demille Movie
9. Beer Ads
10. Music Break
11. Food Ad
12. Hoove's Dogs
13. Lavender Hoove
14. Fish War
15. Weather Report
16. Carozzi Pot Garden
17. Beaner Dealers
18. Gym Hs
19. Fod On T.V.
20. Nightinjail JHS
21. G. Canyon Suite
22. Fudd
23. Johnny
24. Marvin Ratman
25. Recruiting For FBI
26. Zen Story
27. Squash Outro

=== Episode #6 – Deputy Dan Will Find Us No Matter Where We Go ===
Originally aired live on KPFK on November 8, 1970

==== Tracks – side one ====
1. Savings and Loan Spot
2. Beer Drinking
3. Tri-City Spot
4. Education
5. Cock Teasing
6. Bears and Boars
7. Baliol Bros. Spot
8. Mudslide
9. The F(L)Ag
10. Police
11. Aliens Spot
12. Hanging Athenian Gardens
13. Criogenics – Foster Freeze
14. Rabbits
15. Lucky Duck
16. News Items
17. Plane Bombings
18. Boys Books
19. Chicanos
20. Baliol
21. Deputy Dan
22. Police Car
23. Accident
24. Amos and Andy

==== Tracks – side two ====
1. Baliol Spot
2. G. Washington Letter
3. Dr. Memory
4. Baliol
5. P.B.-Operation Bootstrap
6. Fuse Of Doom
7. Baliol Spot
8. Tongue Exercises

=== Episode #7 – Was There A Cow On The Moon? ===
Originally aired live on KPFK on November 29, 1970

==== Tracks – side one ====
1. Barn Dance Opening
2. Peter's Birthday
3. P.P.'S German
4. Movie Score
5. Mars–Marsh
6. Motorcycle
7. Bird-Dog Song
8. Dik-Dik Story
9. Pears-Paris
10. Tarzan
11. Copper Smelting
12. Sex Problems
13. T.V. Guide Girl
14. P.P.'S "Bluff" Piece
15. Pain Pills
16. Brautigan Poem
17. Golgotha Discussion
18. Basket Boys
19. War
20. GI Bills

==== Tracks – side two ====
1. Businessman's Lunch
2. Three Questions
3. Homosexuals And Doctors
4. Copper Smelting
5. Badges
6. Armegeddon
7. War With The Cows
8. "Hell"
9. Message In Rocket Sequence
10. Rose In Spanish Harlem Music Trip
11. Men On The Moon
12. Film-Makers
13. Horse-Players
14. Silence
15. 2-Minute Light
16. Money
17. 45 Seconds To Go...

=== Episode #8 – Being On Radio Is More Fun Than Watching TV ===
side one originally aired live on KPFK on October 18, 1970 side two originally aired live on KPFK on December 6, 1970

==== Tracks – side one ====
1. Columbia School Of Broadcasting
2. Women
3. City Of The Future
4. Sermon
5. "Can't Say That On The Air"
6. Women's Shoes
7. Steel Hat
8. Dr. I.Q.'S Announcing School
9. The Curbfront Shysters
10. Pluto Water
11. Census Taking
12. Serman Continues
13. A Letter Disappears
14. Hitler's Umlaut
15. Discipline
16. P.B. Spills The Coffee
17. Playback Of Spill
18. Sermon Continued
19. Lick-A-Boot

==== Tracks – side two ====
1. Negros A Go Go
2. P.A.'S T.V. Guide
3. Winnie The Pooh – "Eeyore's Birthday"

=== Episode #9 – Dr. Memory's Laff-A-While News ===
Originally aired live on KPFK on January 10, 1971

==== Tracks – side one ====
1. Good News Items
2. News Opening
3. Production Code
4. Bear Story
5. Cops Broadcasting
6. Hippie Words
7. Newscasters
8. Offensive Words
9. More Cops
10. Old Postman
11. Jackie Globenfelt Story
12. Selma W. Selma Song
13. The Morgans
14. Gump Door(?)
15. Rocket
16. Mixville
17. Bringing Up Father
18. Baxter Ward On Fiji
19. Famous Speakers School
20. Car Wash Ad
21. Dr. Memory

==== Tracks – side two ====
1. Fiji Islanders
2. Welsh Accents
3. Prohibited Words
4. Exercises
5. Greaso Practice
6. Cigarette Ads
7. Ecology
8. Army Recruiting
9. Garden Club News
10. French Mother Goose Song And Story
11. Production Code Standards
12. Russian Book
13. Children's Zoo
14. Disappearance Of Animals
15. P.P.'S Grandfather's Letter
16. Mixville Rocket
17. George Put-Put News Ad
18. Dr.Memory

=== Episode #10 – All Nite Images ===
Originally aired live on KPFK on January 17, 1971

==== Tracks – side one ====
1. P.B.'S Voice Prints Of The 60s Spot
2. P.P. On Concerts
3. Sleep Researchers
4. Truck Stop Cafe'
5. Cell Meeting
6. Mental Illness Statistics
7. Fighter Ace
8. Dall Show
9. Bottomless Hot Dog Stand
10. Professional Digester
11. Glutton's Church
12. The Pause
13. Trains
14. Roman Games Trip
15. "Doing His Thing" Bit
16. P.P.'S Ed's Restaurant Spot
17. Broadcaster's School
18. Jew In Palm Springs
19. Yale And Bimidji
20. Business Meeting: Priests
21. Help The Hoove Fund
22. Dialset Story
23. Negro Records
24. Duke Of Madness Motors Spot

==== Tracks – side two ====
1. Latin-Rocket Trip
2. First Buffalo
3. Extinct Animals
4. Ike Speech
5. State Of The Union Race
6. Big Bomb Scare
7. "The Young Polluters"
8. Hoove T.V. Series
9. Sex Mailer
10. And Dirty Pix
11. Sex On T.V.
12. Review Of "Trash"
13. Homosexuals
14. The Talking Porpoise
15. Blind Kids Sniff Pot
16. Lady Driver
17. Russian Driver
18. Kidnappers
19. Reminisences Of T.F.T.
20. Alchemy
21. Summer Police & Doctors Festival
22. Outdoor Sales
23. Beaners
24. Crucified TV
25. Truck Stop Reprise

=== Episode #11 – Welcome To Microorganism State Park ===
Originally aired live on KPFK on January 24, 1971

==== Tracks – side one ====
1. Jiver Intro
2. Melon Mtn. Opening
3. Technical Breakdown
4. Popularization Of Art
5. Saigon Yale Club
6. Jewish Times Story
7. Kung Fu Ad
8. Dr. Dog As Brickbreaker
9. Pet Pills At Fair
10. Kid Roundup
11. Kids In The Street
12. Gravity On Reds
13. Merc. In Fish
14. Pres. Punter & Color T.V.S
15. Rabbit Pellets
16. Beaners Scoring Weed
17. Cow Trip (The Cows Are Not Afraid Of The Dr.)
18. Dr. Whiplash Show
19. Bazerko Lounge Spot
20. Dear Nominee Set
21. P.B. In Holiday Inns
22. Sheep
23. 4th Record – Jim & Spade Nixon
24. Dr. Memory Set

==== Tracks – side two ====
1. Jefferson And The Mason (From the October 18, 1971 live broadcast)
2. P.P. On Sheep
3. D.O.'S Ecology Pitch
4. Tenner's Guide
5. Whiskey Law
6. Voices, Forest Growing
7. Witches Brew
8. Conquistador Club
9. Animals You Won't See
10. Earthworms
11. (Etc. A Mix Of All These To:)
12. Forest Fire Stories
13. "We'll Never Forget"
14. Clock Striking
15. Rent Parties
16. Chinese-Spades
17. Robert Kelly Reading
18. Talk About The Poem
19. Dirty Words
20. Marijuana Scare – Replay
21. 5 Min Light
22. Hollow Trees
23. Where Trees Come From & What They Are Made Of
24. Russian Poem To Sleep
25. Dr. Memory Tag

=== Episode #12 – Is This The Machine That Answers No "N" Yes? ===
Side one originally aired live on KPFK on February 3, 1971 and October 18, 1970. Side two originally aired live on KPFK on February 17, 1971.

==== Tracks – side one ====
1. "Dead Air"
2. P.B.'S Mick Jagger Story – 1:20
3. Fanfare
4. Old Men-Vegetables
5. Rain Falling & Plants Growing
6. Judgement Of The Birds
7. Arm Band Plays "Rudolph"
8. Ascap Financial Report
9. Agnew
10. Plastique
11. "La Condicion Humaine"
12. Propane Car
13. Bing Crosby On Teens
14. Youth-Sex Games On Parade
15. "Paranoia" Piece
16. P.B.'S Andalusion Dog Poem
17. P.P.'S Statement Of Principals
18. P.A.'S Monte Cristo
19. D.O.'S Swing Music (From the February 17, 1971 live broadcast)
20. Station Break (The Firesign Theatre's "Single" release – side A)

==== Tracks – side two ====
1. "Rainin" Music Out
2. Cabin Rest. Spot
3. Yes and No Machine
4. Quotes And Questions
5. Ben Hur
6. Women In Wwii
7. New Money
8. Monastery In White House
9. Elkheart Trains
10. Laugh Track
11. Stanford Train Trip
12. Computors On Acid
13. Subway Tour Guide
14. "Mr. Prominent"
15. Bundles
16. Forward Into The Past (The Firesign Theatre's "Single" release – side B)
17. Termites Eat Steel
18. US Seal
19. Old Cars
20. Statistics
21. Earthquake Farewell

== Issues and reissues ==
These shows were distributed to radio stations on 12 inch, colored label LPs.

Selected parts of these shows were released by the group on the Columbia Records label as the double album Dear Friends in 1972. Other parts were released — without mention of their origin — as parts of the group's Just Folks... A Firesign Chat album on Butterfly Records in 1977.

Between June 15 and September 28, 2010, New York radio station WFMU (with the cooperation of the Firesign Theatre) aired a 16-week series of archival shows which included all but episodes 1, 8, 10, and 12 of the syndicated Dear Friends in chronological order along with an unsyndicated Dear Friends episode broadcast on September 16, 1970 ("Big Brother Is Washing") and episodes of their other KPFK series, The Firesign Theatre Radio Hour Hour and Let's Eat. As of October 2010, the individual programs from this run are available for streaming via the WFMU website, and a selection of the shows rebroadcast by the station are also available via iTunes.
