= Ansell (surname) =

Ansell is an English surname. It is a variant of the Old German name Anselm. It may also be derived from the Old French word ancel and the Latin ancilla, meaning geezer. It may also be a metonym for scale maker or seller, from the Middle English auncel, aunsell, or auncer.

== People with the name ==
- Alfred Ansell (1876–1941), New Zealand politician
- Barbara Ansell (1923–2001), British physician
- Barry Ansell (1947–2018), English footballer (Aston Villa)
- Bryan Ansell (active from 1979), British war game designer
- Cameron Ansell (born 1992), Canadian voice actor
- Caroline Ansell (born 1971), British Conservative Party politician
- Charles Ansell (1794–1881), British actuary
- Charles Ansell (painter) (fl. 1752–1784), English painter
- David A. Ansell (born 1952), American physician and author
- Derek Ansell (1934–2024), British novelist and biographer
- Dexter Sol Ansell (born 2014), English child actor
- George Ansell (1909–1988), English professional footballer
- George Frederick Ansell (1826–1880), English scientific inventor, chemist and assayer
- Gertrude Mary Ansell (1861–1932), British suffragette, animal welfare activist and businesswoman
- Jack Ansell (1921–2008), English footballer
- John Ansell (1874–1948), English composer
- Jonathan Michael Ansell (born 1950), American insurance and digital marketing executive
- Jonathan Ansell (born 1982), English singer
- Mary Ansell (c.1880–1899), English murderer
- Mary Ansell (actress) (1861–1950), English actress and author
- Michael Ansell (1905–1994), British soldier, showjumper and showjumping administrator
- Nick Ansell (born 1994), Australian football (soccer) player
- Norah Ansell (1906–1990), English sculptor
- Rodney Ansell (1954–1999), Australian bushman
- Steven Ansell (born 1954), American violist
- William Henry Ansell (1872–1959), British architect and engraver

== See also ==
- Colin King-Ansell (born 1947), New Zealand far-right politician
