= Anselmo =

Anselmo may refer to:

== Places ==
- Anselmo, Alberta, Canada
- Anselmo, Nebraska, US
- San Anselmo, California, US

== People ==
=== Given name ===
- Anselmo (given name), various individuals
- Anselmo de Moraes (born 1989), Brazilian football player known by the mononym Anselmo
- Anselmo Cardoso (born 1984), Portuguese football player known by the mononym Anselmo
- Anselmo Eyegue (born 1990), Equatoguinean football player known by the mononym Anselmo

=== Family name ===
- Federico Anselmo (born 1994), Argentine footballer
- Fortunato Anselmo (1883–1965), Italian diplomat
- Giovanni Anselmo (1934–2023), Italian artist
- José Antônio Cardoso Anselmo Pereira (born 1959), Brazilian footballer
- Mary Anselmo, American founder of PanAmSat
- Peregrino Anselmo (1902–1975), Uruguayan football player
- Phil Anselmo (born 1968), American heavy metal vocalist best known as the frontman of Pantera
- Rene Anselmo (1926–1995), American television personality
- Tony Anselmo (born 1960), American animator and voice-over actor
- Tony Anselmo (Canadian football) (1918–2009), Canadian community builder for the Calgary Stampeders Football Club
- Vic Anselmo, Latvian singer-songwriter

== Fiction ==
- Anselmo, a character in "The Impertinently Curious Man", a story-within-the-story in Don Quixote
- Anselmo, the elderly guide of Robert Jordan in the novel For Whom the Bell Tolls by Ernest Hemingway
- Anselmo, the father whose death instigates the events of the Spanish Film Cría Cuervos

== See also ==
- Anselm (disambiguation), the English form of the name
- Anselmus (disambiguation), the Latin form of the name
- Ansel (disambiguation) and Ansell (disambiguation), the German form of the name
- St Anselm (disambiguation), various people
- Saint Anselm's (disambiguation), various places
