= Anselmo (given name) =

People with the given name Anselmo include:

== In arts and media ==
=== Music ===
- Anselmo Aieta (1896–1964), Argentine bandoneon musician, composer and actor
- Anselmo Colzani (1918–2006), Italian operatic baritone singer
- Anselmo López (musician) (1934–2016), Venezuelan musician
- Anselmo Ralph (born 1981), Angolan singer
- Anselmo Sacasas (1912–1998), Cuban jazz pianist, bandleader, composer, and arranger

=== Visual arts ===
- Anselmo Bucci (1887–1955), Italian painter
- Anselmo Canerio (died 1575), Italian painter of the Renaissance period
- Anselmo Martinez, Tejano artist
- Anselmo Piccoli (1915–1992), Argentine abstract artist
- Anselmo Sacerdote (1868–1926), Italian painter, engraver, and photographer

=== Other media ===
- Anselmo Duarte (1920–2009), Brazilian actor
- Anselmo L. Figueroa (1861–1915), Mexican-American anarchist political figure and journalist
- Anselmo Lorenzo (1841–1914), Spanish author, "the grandfather of Spanish anarchism"
- Anselmo Raguileo Lincopil (1922–1992), linguist, researcher and poet of the Mapuche people
- Anselmo Suárez y Romero (1818–1878), Cuban writer and novelist

== In politics ==
- Anselmo Alliegro y Milá (1899–1961), Cuban politician
- Anselmo de la Cruz (1777–1833), Chilean political figure
- Anselmo José Braamcamp (1817–1885), Portuguese politician
- Anselmo L. Figueroa (1861–1915), Mexican-American anarchist political figure and journalist
- Anselmo Marini (1906–2002), Argentine lawyer and politician
- Anselmo Guido Pecorari (born 1946), Italian Roman Catholic archbishop and diplomat
- Anselmo Sule (1934–2002), Chilean politician

== In religion ==
- Anselmo Banduri (c. 1675–1743), Benedictine scholar, archaeologist and numismatologist
- Anselmo Costadoni (1714–1785), Italian Camaldolese monk, historian and theologian
- Anselmo da Baggio (died 1073), Pope Alexander II
- Anselmo della Pusterla (died 1136), Archbishop of Milan, as Anselm V
- Anselmo Zarza Bernal (1916–2014), Mexican Roman Catholic Bishop
- Anselmo Guido Pecorari (born 1946), Italian Roman Catholic archbishop and diplomat
- Anselmo Müller (1932–2011), Brazilian Roman Catholic bishop

== In sport ==
=== Football (soccer) ===
- Anselmo de Moraes (born 1989), Brazilian football player known by mononym Anselmo
- Anselmo Cardoso (born 1984), Portuguese football player known by his mononym Anselmo
- Anselmo Eyegue (born 1990), Equatoguinean football player, known by his mononym Anselmo
- Anselmo Fernandez (1918–2000), Portuguese architect and football manager
- Anselmo García MacNulty (born 2003), Irish-Spanish football player
- Anselmo Luís Rodrigues (born 1967), Brazilian football goalkeeper
- Anselmo Ramon (born 1988), Brazilian football player
- Anselmo Ribeiro (born 1974), Cape Verdean football player
- Anselmo Robbiati (born 1970), Italian football player
- Anselmo Tadeu Silva do Nascimento (born 1980), Brazilian football forward
- Anselmo Vendrechovski Júnior (born 1982), Brazilian football player, nicknamed Juninho

=== Other sports ===
- Anselmo Citterio (1927–2006), Italian cyclist
- Anselmo López (basketball) (1910–2004), Spanish basketball coach and administrator
- Anselmo Moreno (born 1985), Panamanian professional boxer
- Anselmo Silvino (born 1945), Italian weightlifter
- Anselmo Viviani (1915–?), Italian cross-country skier

== In other fields ==
- Anselmo Banduri (c. 1675–1743), Benedictine scholar, archaeologist and numismatologist
- Anselmo Costadoni (1714–1785), Italian Camaldolese monk, historian and theologian
- Anselmo Fernandez (1918–2000), Portuguese architect and football manager
- Anselmo Pardo Alcaide (1913–1977), Spanish entomologist
- Anselmo Raguileo Lincopil (1922–1992), linguist, researcher and poet of the Mapuche people
