= Anselmus =

Anselmus may refer to:

- Various Anselms (Latin: Anselmus)
- Anselmus de Boodt (1550–1632), Belgian mineralogist and physician
- A character in The Second Maiden's Tragedy

== See also ==
- Ansel (disambiguation) and Ansell (disambiguation), the German form of the name
- Anselmo (disambiguation), the Italian form of the name
- St Anselm (disambiguation), various saints
- St Anselm's (disambiguation), various places
