= Hanzel =

Hanzel is a surname and a given name. Notable people with the name include:

== Surname ==
- Ľuboš Hanzel (born 1987), Slovak footballer
- Łukasz Hanzel (born 1986), Polish footballer
- Milan Hanzel (1994–1994), Government ministers of Slovakia
- Tomáš Hanzel (born 1989), Slovak football defender

== Given name ==
- Hanzel Martínez (born 1991), Mexican professional boxer

== See also ==
- Hanzel und Gretyl, an American industrial metal band
- Hansel (disambiguation)
