= Ansel (name) =

Ansel is a name derived from the same root as Anselm, a medieval Germanic name of uncertain meaning, perhaps view 'follower of a nobleman' or 'with divine protection'. Notable people with the name include:

== Given name ==
- Ansel Adams (1902–1984), American photographer and environmentalist
- Ansel Briggs (1806–1881), American politician
- Ansel Elgort (born 1994), American actor and musician
- Ansel Elkins (born 1982), American poet
- Ansel Galimov (born 1991), Russian ice hockey player
- Ansel Franklin Hall (1894–1962), American naturalist
- Ansel Haugsjaa (born 2004), American luger
- Ansel Krut (born 1959), South African painter
- Ansel Sterling (1782–1853), American politician
- Ansel Talbert (1912–1987), American aviation journalist
- Ansel Walling (1824–1896), American politician
- Ansel Watrous (1835–1927), American newspaper editor and historian
- Ansel Williamson (1806–1881), American thoroughbred horse racing trainer
- Ansel Wong (born 1945), Trinidadian cultural and political activist
- Edgar Ansel Mowrer (1892–1977), American journalist

== Surname ==
- Dominique Ansel (born 1977), French pastry chef
- Elise Ansel (born 1962), American painter
- Julius Ansel (1908–1965), American politician
- Karen Ansel, American visual effects designer
- Martin Frederick Ansel (1850–1945), American politician
- Ruth Ansel (born 1938), American graphic designer
- Talvikki Ansel (born 1962), American poet
