= Ansell (disambiguation) =

Ansell is an Australian company which manufactures medical gloves and condoms.

Ansell may also refer to:

== People ==
- Ansell (given name)
- Ansell (surname)

== Places ==
- Ansell, Alberta, Canada
- Ansells End, England

== Species ==
- Ansell's shrew
- Ansell's mole-rat
- Ansell's epauletted fruit bat

== See also ==
- Ansel (disambiguation)
