= Saint Anselm's College (disambiguation) =

Saint Anselm's College may refer to:

- Saint Anselm College, a liberal arts college in Goffstown, New Hampshire
- St. Anselm's College, a grammar school in Merseyside, England

== See also ==
- Saint Anselm's (disambiguation)
- St. Anselm's School (disambiguation)
