= Ľuboš Hanzel =

Slovak footballer

Personal information
- Full name: Ľuboš Hanzel
- Date of birth: 7 May 1987 (age 39)
- Place of birth: Zavar, Czechoslovakia
- Height: 1.82 m (6 ft 0 in)
- Position: Left-back

Team information
- Current team: OŠK Zavar

Youth career
- Spartak Trnava

Senior career*
Years	Team	Apps	(Gls)
2004–2012	Spartak Trnava	123	(3)
2008	→ Senec (loan)	11	(0)
2009	→ Schalke 04 (loan)	1	(0)
2013	Jagiellonia Białystok	6	(0)
2013	Banants	11	(1)
2014	Dukla Prague	5	(0)
2014–2015	Banants	27	(5)
2015	Spartak Trnava	3	(0)
2016–2017	Iskra Borčice	40	(7)
2018	Nové Zámky		
2018–2020	Slovan Duslo Šaľa		
2021–2023	FC Illmitz		
2023–	OŠK Zavar		

International career
- Slovakia U21
2009	Slovakia	1	(1)
- * Club domestic league appearances and goals as of 7 May 2024

Ľuboš Hanzel (born 7 May 1987) is a Slovak footballer who plays as a left-back for OŠK Zavar.

== Club career ==
Hanzel began his career in Spartak Trnava. In January 2008, he was loaned to Senec where he played eleven games, before returning to Trnava in July 2008. In summer 2009, he was linked with move to Copenhagen. On 13 August 2009, he moved to FC Schalke 04 on a half-year loan with option for two and a half additional years.

On 12 December 2009, Hanzel made his Bundesliga debut and replaced Jefferson Farfán in 90th minute in away match against Werder Bremen. After only one game for Schalke 04 he returned to Trnava in January 2010.

In January 2013, Hanzel joined Jagiellonia Białystok on a free transfer. He made his debut on 23 February 2013, playing the whole match in a 4–0 away defeat to Podbeskidzie Bielsko-Biała.

He joined Czech side Dukla Prague in February 2014, signing a half-year contract.

== International career ==
On 6 June 2009, Hanzel made his international debut in the 2010 World Cup qualification win over San Marino. In the same match he scored his first international goal.

== Personal life ==
His brother Tomáš Hanzel is currently playing for ŠK SFM Senec. He has one sister Dominika Hanzelová.

== International goal ==
#	Date	Venue	Opponent	Score	Result	Competition
1	6 June 2009	Tehelné pole, Bratislava, Slovakia	San Marino	7–0	7–0	2010 FIFA World Cup qualification
