= Fortunato Anselmo House =

Historic house in Salt Lake City, Utah, U.S.

- U.S. National Register of Historic Places
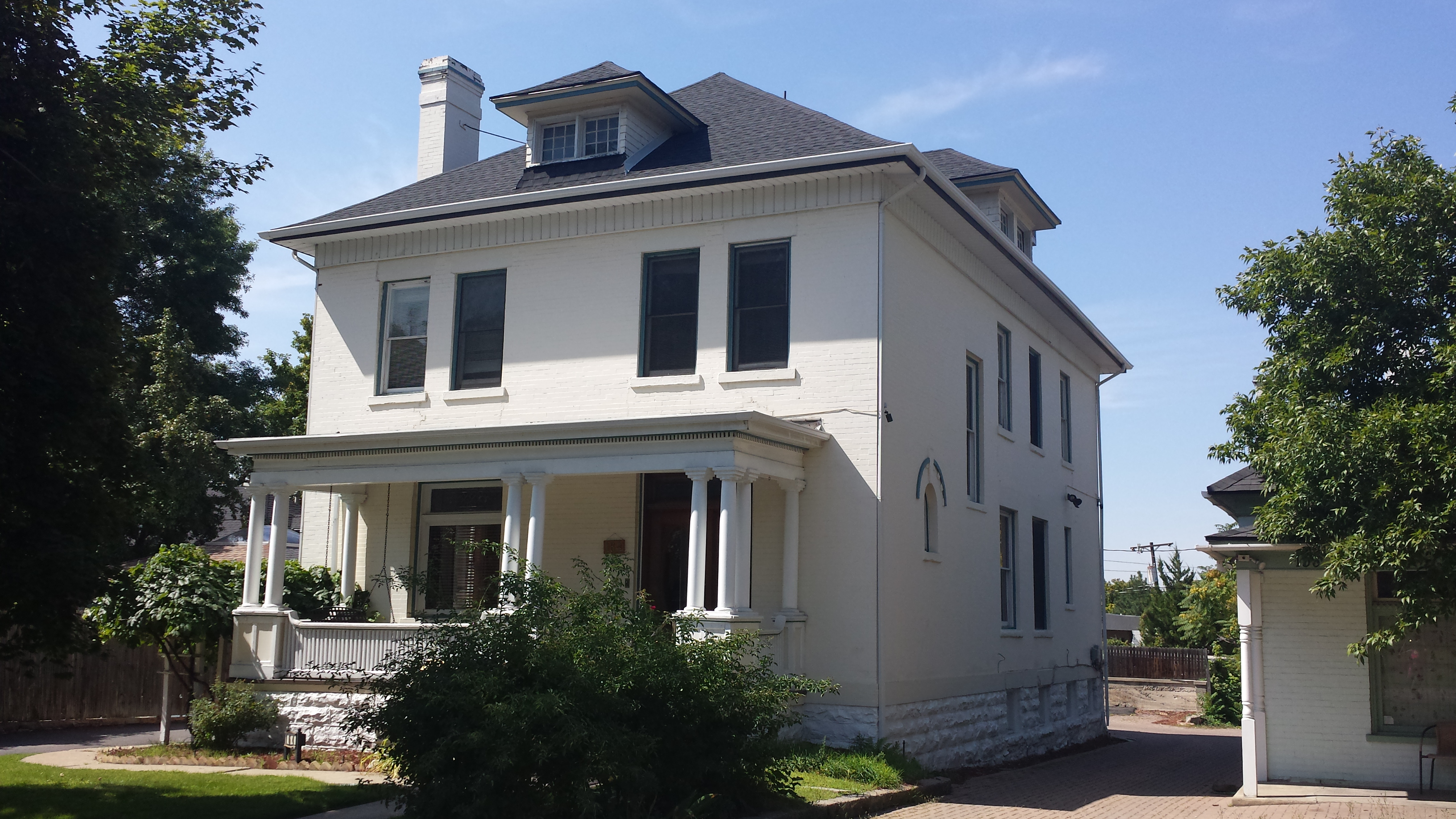

- Location within Utah Location within the United States
- Location: 164 S. 900 East, Salt Lake City, Utah
- Coordinates: 40°45′56″N 111°51′54″W
- Area: less than one acre
- Built: 1903
- Architect: Wood, Silas B.
- Architectural style: Late Victorian
- NRHP reference No.: 79002499
- Added to NRHP: May 21, 1979

The Fortunato Anselmo House (also known as the Ronald L. Beers House) is a historic house built in Late Victorian style located at 164 South 900 East in Salt Lake City, Utah, United States.

== Description and history ==
The house was built in 1903 by a carpenter and contractor named Silas B. Wood at approximately $4,000 in cost. In 1920, it became home for Fortunato and Anna Anselmo, who owned it until 1950. It became significant as the residence of the country of Italy's "vice consul for Utah and Wyoming". Fortunate Anselmo, originally of Grimaldi, Italy, had become a spokesperson of Italian community as a newspaper owner, but sold the newspaper in 1915 upon being appointed vice consul. He continued to serve as an agent of the Bank of Naples, sending money orders from Italian-Americans of Salt Lake City back to their home country.

It was listed on the National Register of Historic Places on May 21, 1979, for having a state-wide significance.

== See also ==
- National Register of Historic Places listings in Salt Lake City
