= St. Anselm's School =

St. Anselm's School may refer to:

- St. Anselm's Abbey School, Washington, D.C., US
- St. Anselm's Catholic School, Kent, England
- St. Anselm's North City School, Jaipur, India
- St. Anselm's Pink City Sr. Sec. School, Jaipur, Rajasthan, India
- St Anselm's School, Bakewell, Derbyshire, England

== See also ==
- Saint Anselm's (disambiguation)
- Saint Anselm's College (disambiguation)
