= St. Anselm's Church =

St. Anselm's Church may refer to:

- St. Anselm's Church (Lafayette, California), United States
- St. Anselm's Church (Bronx, New York), United States
- St. Anselm's Catholic Church, Rectory and Parish Hall, Anselmo, Nebraska, United States
- St Anselm's Church, Pembury, Kent, United Kingdom
- St Anselm's Church, Kennington, London, United Kingdom
- St Anselm's Church, Southall, London, United Kingdom

== See also ==
- Saint Anselm's (disambiguation)
- Saint Anselm Abbey (New Hampshire)
- Saint Anselm's Abbey (Washington, D.C.)
- St. Anselm's Cemetery, Wrought-Iron Cross Site, Berwick, North Dakota, NRHP-listed
