= Utah Italians =

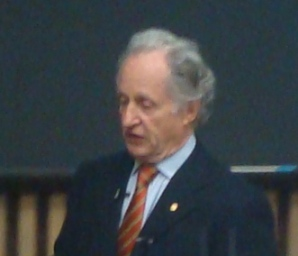
Nobel Mario Capecchi

Utah Italians are the descendants of immigrants from Italy, along with recent immigrants from Italy, who live in the U.S. state of Utah.

== Demographics ==
According to the 2000 census, 57,500 people in Utah claimed some Italian ancestry, with about 3,000 being recent immigrants. The percentage of Italian Americans in Utah is about 2.3 percent. Nationally, their percentage is calculated around 5.6 percent, with the majority living in the Northeast, in the Midwest, in California, and in Florida.

== Notable Italians in Utah ==
- Fortunato Anselmo was the Vice Consul of Italy of Salt Lake City from the 1920s to the beginning of the World War II. He was very respected for his volunteer work in favor of the new Italian immigrants.
- Tony Anselmo, voice actor who has been the main voice actor of Donald Duck since 1985.
- Mario Capecchi is the 2007 Nobel Prize winner for Medicine.
- Joseph Toronto was the first Italian who came to Utah with the first pioneers in 1848. He was the "President's (Brigham Young) herdsman." In 1850 he accompanied Lorenzo Snow in the first Italian Mormon mission in the Turin area, where they converted a few Waldensians. He has many notable descendants in Utah.

== Organizations ==
=== Past ===
The main goal of the early fraternal organizations were to provide funding for sick days to members, because at that time there was no coverage for workers. The most important were: Fratellanza Minatori, founded at Sunnyside in 1902. Italian Americanization Club, was based in Salt Lake City, starting from 1919. Società Cristoforo Colombo, operated in Salt Lake City, Ogden and Castle Gate for several years, starting in 1897.

=== Present ===
The Italian American Civic League was founded in 1934 and it is still active today. It is the oldest remaining Italian club in Utah and is also a non-profit organization. The Friendly Club was founded in Ogden by a group of northern Italians from the region of Trentino (north of Venice) in 1937. Today it is called the Trentini Club. Italian American Lawyers Association was founded a few years ago. They have monthly meetings.

== Education ==
As of today, Brigham Young University is the only educational institution in Utah that has a B.A. program in Italian Language and Culture. They also offer a program in Florence and Rome. The University of Utah offers a minor in Italian language, along with a program in Siena. Through OSHER, a beginning language course is also offered. East High School in Salt Lake City offers a short beginning course. Nationally, Italian is the fourth most taught language in schools and colleges, after Spanish, French, and German.

== Media ==
In the early years of Italian immigration, several newspapers appeared, such as Il Minatore, edited by Mose Paggi, La Gazzetta Italiana, by G. Milano, La Scintilla, by Alfonso Russo and G. Milano, and Il Corriere d'America, by Frank Niccoli and Alfonso Russo. Copies of these newspapers, as well as old pictures, and taped and transcribed interviews of prominent Italians are kept at the Special Collection of the J. Willard Marriott Library at the University of Utah.

Recently, the In Piazza magazine was published from 1998 to 2004. As of today, there are no Italian paper periodicals published in Utah.

== Utah Italians ==
Over the years Italy has provided Utah with thousands of people. Some came for religious motivations and most for better economic opportunities. Four thousand came as prisoners of war and a few remained in Utah after the World War II ended. Eight of them rest in a Salt Lake City cemetery after being killed by a camp sentinel. A few hundred Utah soldiers fought in Italy against the Germans and the Fascists and several died. Regarding the number of people, for many years the balance has been in favor of Italy. But starting from the late 1960s, many Mormon missionaries from Utah are active in the major Italian cities. During the past forty years, several thousand of them have spent up to two years in Italy. As a result of their efforts, about 20,000 Italians have converted to Mormonism. Some of them have married former Mormon missionaries. LDS chapels and congregations are present in most Italian cities. The Genealogical Society of Utah has microfilmed a large percentage of Italy’s Catholic Church and Civil Records. This project is ongoing.

=== Trade and tourism ===
Italy is one of the top 25 of Utah's trading partners. Gold is the major product exported to Italy, followed by computer electronics and software. According to official data, Utah is visited every year by about 12,000 Italians.

== See also ==
- Cultural assimilation
- Immigration
- Italian Americans
- Multiculturalism
- National and ethnic cultures of Utah
- 2002 Winter Olympics closing ceremony
