= Ansel =

Ansel may refer to:

== Places ==
- Ansel, California
- Ansel Adams Wilderness, California
- Ansel Township, Cass County, Minnesota
- Mount Ansel Adams, California

== Other uses ==
- Ansel (name), including a list of people with the name
- ANSEL (American National Standard for Extended Latin), a character set used in text encoding
- Ansel Adams Award (disambiguation), various awards
- Nvidia Ansel, an Nvidia technology for taking screenshots in game engines

== See also ==
- Ansell (disambiguation)
- Anselm (disambiguation), the English form of the name
- Anselmo (disambiguation), the Italian form of the name
- Anselmus (disambiguation), the Latin form of the name
- Hansel (disambiguation)
