= Miles McEnery Gallery =

Contemporary art gallery in Chelsea, Manhattan

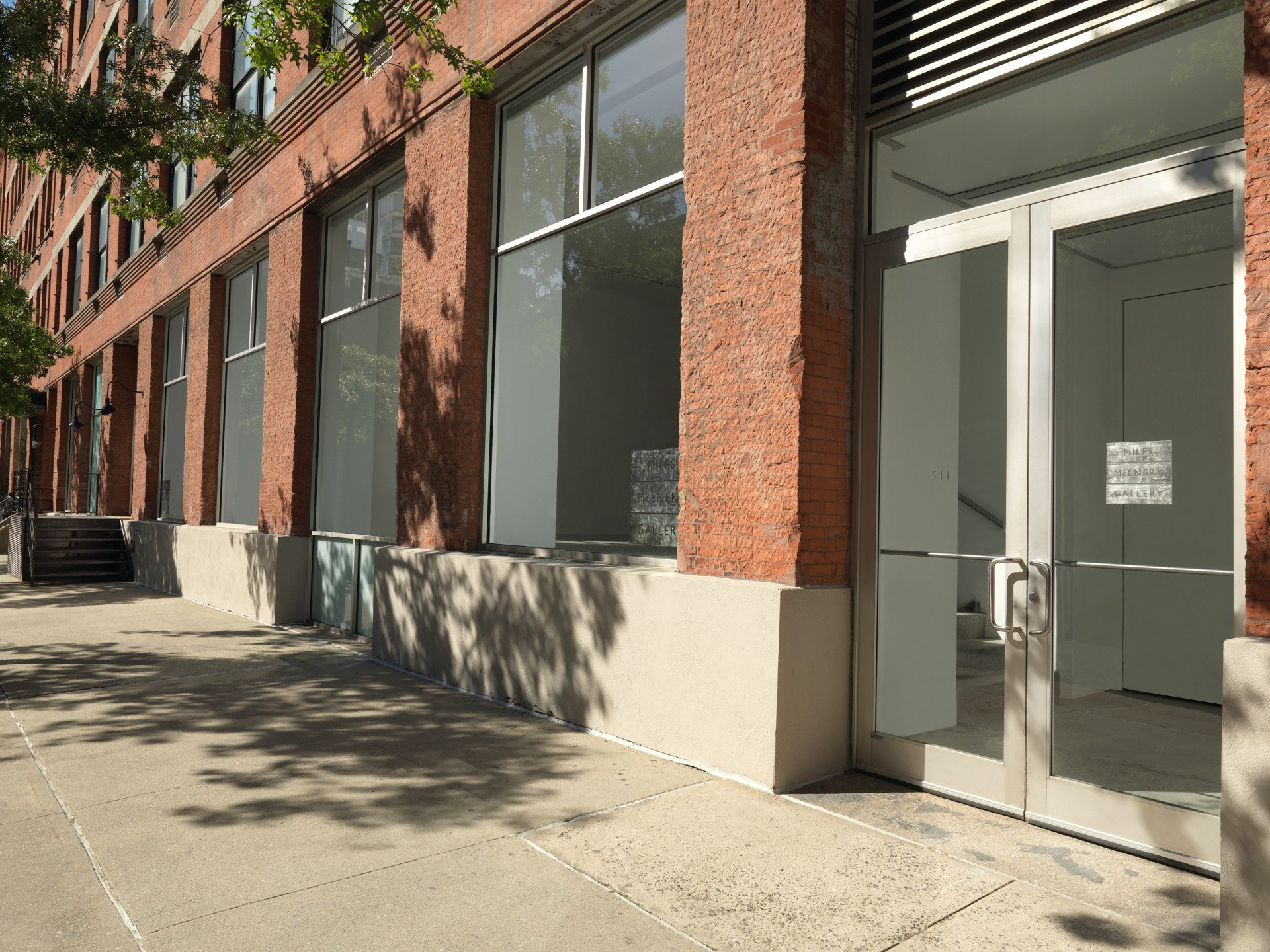
- Former name: Ameringer l McEnery l Yohe
- Established: 1999
- Location: 511 West 22nd Street; 515 West 22nd Street; 525 West 22nd Street; 520 West 21st Street; Chelsea, Manhattan, New York
- Coordinates: 40.7476°N 74.0057°W
- Type: Contemporary art gallery
- Principal: Miles McEnery
- Website: milesmcenery.com

Miles McEnery Gallery is a contemporary art gallery headed by principal Miles McEnery and located in the Chelsea neighborhood of New York City. The gallery, founded in 1999, was previously known as Ameringer | McEnery | Yohe before changing to its current name in 2018.

The gallery represents a multi-generational, international roster of more than fifty artists and artist estates, with a focus on abstract and representational painting and drawing. Its artist roster includes Bo Bartlett, Rosson Crow, Lisa Corinne Davis, Inka Essenhigh, Rico Gatson, April Gornik, Jacob Hashimoto, Markus Linnenbrink, Fiona Rae, James Siena, and Patrick Wilson, as well as the estates of Hans Hofmann, Wolf Kahn and Emily Mason, among others.

== Locations ==
Miles McEnery Gallery operates four locations in Chelsea, occupying approximately 26,000 square feet in total. These include: its headquarters at 525 West 22nd Street, opened in 2009 and renovated in 2018; a space at 520 West 21st Street inaugurated in September 2018; and subsequent locations at 515 West 22nd Street and 511 West 22nd Street opened in 2021 and 2022, respectively. Prior to moving to Chelsea, the gallery was based in Midtown Manhattan at 20 West 57th Street (2002–09) and at 41 East 57th Street (1999–2002).

== History ==
The gallery's history originates with the influential André Emmerich Gallery, which developed a reputation beginning in the 1960s for championing abstract expressionism, emerging styles such as color field and hard-edge painting, minimalism and pop art, and women artists. After the gallery closed in 1998, two of Emmerich's former directors, Will Ameringer and James Yohe, founded Ameringer & Yohe Fine Art in the fall of 1999 in the same building Emmerich was located in, the 1929 Art Deco-style Fuller Building at 41 East 57th Street. The two founders were joined shortly thereafter by Miles McEnery, who was a generation younger.

The new gallery specialized in postwar and contemporary American art, showing many of Emmerich's artists, including Helen Frankenthaler, Nancy Graves, Al Held, David Hockney, Hans Hofmann, John McLaughlin, Morris Louis, Kenneth Noland, Jules Olitski, Judy Pfaff and Esteban Vicente. In 2001, it was granted membership to the Art Dealers Association of America (ADAA). The following year, it relocated to a Richard Gluckman-designed space at 20 West 57th Street.

In its first decade, the gallery continued exhibiting well-known artists, including the abstract expressionist Joan Mitchell, color field-adjacent artists like Bay Area painter Richard Diebenkorn, the landscapist Wolf Kahn and Pat Steir, British painter Howard Hodgkin and hard-edge artist Frank Stella. During this period it mounted historically oriented exhibitions accompanied by scholarly catalogues dedicated to the work of Frankenthaler, Graves, Frederick Hammersley, Hofmann, Kahn, and Alfred Leslie, among others.

By 2009, the gallery was known as Ameringer | McEnery | Yohe, with McEnery having become a partner and the managing director. That year, the gallery moved to its Chelsea headquarters at 525 West 22nd Street, an expanded space formerly inhabited by 303 Gallery that made larger and concurrent exhibitions possible. In 2018, the gallery was renamed Miles McEnery Gallery and underwent a renovation and expansion that included adding three more exhibition spaces over a four-year period.

== Artists ==
Miles McEnery Gallery represents more than fifty artists and artist estates. The gallery generally focuses on painting and drawing that avoids prescriptive statements and ranges from abstract to representational.

By the time of its 2018 renaming, the gallery shifted toward a more multi-generational, international and contemporary group of artists. Additions to its roster included critically recognized figures such as Inka Essenhigh, Beverly Fishman and Suzanne Caporael, abstract painters Kevin Appel, Tomory Dodge and Yunhee Min, hard-edge abstractionist Patrick Wilson, and figurative painters Bo Bartlett and John Sonsini.

Since then, the gallery has also taken on established international artists such as the Young British Artist-member Fiona Rae, Swiss painter Pia Fries and German artist Markus Linnenbrink; Guggenheim Fellowship recipients Lisa Corinne Davis and James Siena; contemporary landscape artists April Gornik, Elliott Green and Isca Greenfield-Sanders; abstract painters Elise Ansel, Trudy Benson, Rico Gatson and Jim Isermann; and mixed-media artists Roy Dowell, Jacob Hashimoto and Tom LaDuke.

The gallery also represents the estates of the abstract expressionist pioneer Hans Hofmann, landscape artist Wolf Kahn, color field painter Emily Mason, and New York School-member Esteban Vicente. In 2021, the gallery staged concurrent, posthumous solo exhibitions of Kahn and Mason, who were married for over sixty years. Kahn, who died in 2020, was a longtime friend to McEnery.
