= Saint Anselm (disambiguation) =

Saint Anselm or Anselm of Canterbury was archbishop of Canterbury in the 11th and 12th centuries.

Saint Anselm may also refer to:

- Anselm of Lucca the Younger (1036–1086), bishop of Lucca, Italy
- Anselm, Duke of Friuli (died 805), founding abbot of the monastery of Nonantula
- Saint Anselm Abbey (New Hampshire), a Benedictine abbey of monks in Goffstown, New Hampshire, United States
  - Saint Anselm College, its associated college
- Sant'Anselmo all'Aventino, the primatial abbey of the Benedictines in Rome, Italy, that has four institutions:
  - Pontifical Atheneum of St. Anselm (Pontificio Ateneo Sant'Anselmo), its associated pontifical university
  - College of Sant'Anselmo, its ecclesiastical residential college
  - Curia of the Benedictine Confederation located at Sant'Anselmo
  - Church of Sant'Anselmo located on the grounds of Sant'Anselmo all'Aventino

== See also ==
- Anselm (disambiguation)
- Saint Anselm's (disambiguation)
