= Wilbert (archbishop of Cologne) =

Wilbert (Note: His name may also be spelled Wilibert, Willibert or Willebert.) (died 889) was the archbishop of Cologne from 870 until his death.

Wilbert was a priest in Cologne Cathedral when archbishop Gunther was excommunicated and deposed. Charles the Bald, king of West Francia, tried to install his own palatine cleric, Hilduin, as archbishop. He failed when Louis the German, king of East Francia, sent Liutbert, archbishop of Mainz, to consecrate the priest Wilbert instead. On 7 January 870, Wilbert was acclaimed by Liutbert with the consent of the clergy and people of the diocese, with Odilbald of Utrecht assisting the consecration. Pope Hadrian II sent an embassy under Wibod, bishop of Parma, carrying his letters of acceptance. His appointment was made rapidly in order to foil any attempt by Louis's rival, Charles the Bald, to fill the vacant see with a candidate favourable to him. Charles did succeed in placing Bertulf in power in the archdiocese of Trier.

Wilbert received the contested pallium from Pope Hadrian in 875. He extended the cathedral for use in holding synods, held the first provincial synod of his province there in 887, and was the first archbishop buried in the cathedral in 889. On 26 September 870, a German synod, attended by Liutbert and Bertulf, was held in Cologne with all the bishops of Saxony. The cathedral, desecrated by Gunther, was reconsecrated to Saint Peter.

On 4 July 876, Wilbert led an embassy of German bishops to Charles the Bald's synod at Ponthion to claim for Louis the German a part in the inheritance of the late Emperor Louis II of Italy. The synod rebuffed them, since Pope John VIII was a strong supporter of Charles, and forced them to take an oath of fidelity to Ansegis, one of Charles's churchmen, whom the pope had appointed legate for all Europe north of the Alps. After Louis the German's death, Charles the Bald disputed the right of the former's heir, Louis the Younger, to receive Louis's share of Lotharingia. On 7 October 876, Charles was preparing a surprise attach on Louis the Younger, when Wilbert discovered the plot and warned Louis. The ensuing battle was a defeat for Charles.

Cologne was pillaged and razed by Vikings in 881–882, but Liutbert of Mainz assisted in rebuilding it. Wilbert and Henry of Franconia met the Viking leader Godfrid, Duke of Frisia, at Herespich, an island in the confluence of the Rhine and the Waal. At the meeting, Godfrid was killed and Wilbert persuaded Gisela, his wife, to leave the island and pursue a policy of peace.

Preceded by Gunther	Archbishop of Cologne; 870–889	Succeeded by Herman I
