= Inka Essenhigh =

American painter (born 1969)

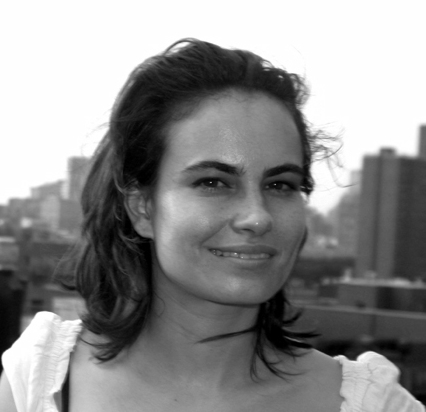
- Essenhigh in 2005
- Born: 1969 (age 56–57); Bellefonte, Pennsylvania, US
- Education: Columbus College of Art and Design, School of Visual Arts (MFA)
- Occupations: Painter, educator
- Known for: Painting, printmaking
- Movement: Pop Surrealism, New Figuration, Comic Abstraction
- Spouse: Steve Mumford

Inka Essenhigh (born 1969) is an American painter and educator, based in New York City. Throughout her career, Essenhigh has had solo exhibitions at galleries such as Deitch Projects, Mary Boone Gallery, 303 Gallery, Stefan Stux Gallery, and Jacob Lewis Gallery in New York, Kotaro Nukaga, Tomio Koyama Gallery in Tokyo, and Il Capricorno in Venice.

== Education ==
Essenhigh graduated from Upper Arlington High School and studied at the Columbus College of Art and Design in Ohio (1991) and earned a Master of Fine Arts from the School of Visual Arts in New York (1992–94). She has taught at the New York Academy of Art and was a Master Artist at the Atlantic Center for the Arts.

Midsummer Night’s Dream, 2017, enamel on canvas, 32 x 80 inches, as published in Artforum

== Work ==
In the mid-1990s, Essenhigh was among the first generation of American artists to return to figuration. Stylistically, her paintings have been described as ranging from completely flat to rendering deep pictorial space, blending abstraction and figuration and going back and forth between the two. In the late 1990s, Essenhigh's work attracted attention as one of a generation of young painters in New York, including Cecily Brown, Damien Loeb and Will Cotton. Her early work was sometimes characterized as "Pop Surrealism" for its strangely attenuated cartoon forms and flat, simple colors. She was included in the influential 1998 Pop Surrealism exhibition at the Aldrich Museum of Contemporary Art, which Steven Henry Madoff described in Artforum as follows: “The mutant sensibility at work in this droll, smartly curated exhibition proposes the marriage of Surrealism's dream-laden fetish for the body eroticized and grotesque and Pop art's celebration of the shallower, corrosively bright world given over to the packaged good.”

Spring, 2006, oil on canvas, 72 x 62 inches (182.9 x 157.5 cm) at the Smithsonian American Art Museum

A decade later, Essenhigh was included in another groundbreaking exhibition — The Museum of Modern Art’s Comic Abstraction: Image Making, Image Breaking (2007). The mid 2000s brought on a distinct shift in Essenhigh’s style and materials, from her use of very flat enamel paints in the 1990s, to a more atmospheric application of oil paint in the new decade. (see Born Again, 1999, enamel on canvas, in the collection of the Tate Modern versus Spring, 2006, oil on canvas, in the collection of the Smithsonian American Art Museum.) For Essenhigh, these changes in materials not only differed aesthetically, but pointed to clear references in art history: “I stopped painting in oil for a time and started using enamel. At the time I needed to get away from all that history, that search for deeper emotions. I needed to drop all the baggage that comes with oil paint and do something completely contemporary, which I found in the slick, bright, flat surfaces of enamels.” Essenhigh has most recently moved back to enamel painting, but completed in such a manner as to retain the qualities of light found in her earlier work with oil (as seen in Midsummer Night’s Dream, enamel on canvas, 2017).

Born Again, 1999, Enamel on Canvas, from the collection of the Tate Modern

Deluge, 1998, oil enamel on canvas, 72 x 72 inches (182.88 x 182.88 cm) Collection Albright-Knox Art Gallery, Buffalo, New York

While Essenhigh often made use of automatic drawing early on in her career, the work has since shifted to a very intentional use of narrative content. In an interview with the Smithsonian American Art Museum, Essenhigh explains, “Maybe I don’t need to take whatever comes out of my imagination and be ok with that. Maybe I can start to form the world that I want to live in.” Mythology, landscape and the urban versus pastoral are recurring motifs in her work, although Essenhigh does not limit herself by subject. She has blended abstraction and figuration in an investigation of psychological and metaphysical realities. In a 2018 Hyperallergic review, the artist/writer Peter Malone describes, “Essenhigh reveals a freedom that resonates with all manner of fusion: of figure and design, of abstraction and narrative, of sentiment and humor, and more generally, of ambitious painting with a readable narrative.” Essenhigh states, “I think about the archetypes and stories that we tell ourselves, and reenact in some way. We change our consciousness through storytelling all the time. If you want to change how people are thinking about something, you can tell a story about it. It does the job really fast. I don’t think I’m necessarily changing consciousness, but I’m painting another place. I would like my paintings to have that feeling — that other worlds are possible.”

In 2018, Essenhigh completed a mural at the Drawing Center in New York, NY and had two solo exhibitions, one at Miles McEnery Gallery in New York, NY and a retrospective at the Virginia Museum of Contemporary Art in Virginia Beach, VA, "A Fine Line", which traveled to the Kalamazoo Institute of Arts. Essenhigh’s first monograph was published by MOCA in conjunction with the exhibition.

== Selected exhibitions ==
- 2019 “A Fine Line,” Kalamazoo Institute of Arts, Kalamazoo, MI.
- 2018 "Manhattanhenge," The Drawing Center, New York, NY.
- “A Fine Line,” Virginia Museum of Contemporary Art, Virginia Beach, VA.
- Miles McEnery Gallery, New York, NY
- "The New Frontiers of Painting," Fondazione Stelline, Milan, Italy.
- 2016 “Between Worlds,” Frist Art Museum, Nashville, TN.
- 2015 "The Ukrainian Diaspora: Women Artists 1908–2015." The Ukrainian Museum, New York, NY.
- “Disturbing Innocence,” Curated by Eric Fischl, The FLAG Art Foundation, New York, NY.
- 2014 “Comet Dust & Crystal Shards,” Jacob Lewis Gallery, New York, NY.
- 2012 "The Natural and the Man-made," Tomio Koyama Gallery, Tokyo, Japan.
- 2011 "Inka Essenhigh: New Editions & Monoprints," Pace Prints, New York, NY.
- "UN/Natural Splendor," Center for Maine Contemporary Art, Rockport, ME.
- 2010 "The Old New Age," 303 Gallery, New York, NY.
- 2007 "Comic Abstraction: Image-Breaking, Image-Making." Museum of Modern Art, New York, NY.
- 2006 303 Gallery, New York, NY.
- “The Compulsive Line: Etching 1900 to Now,” Museum of Modern Art, New York, NY.
- 2004 SITE Santa Fe 5th International Biennial (curated by Robert Storr), Santa Fe, New Mexico.
- Universes in Universes, The 26th São Paulo Biennial, Sao Paulo, Brazil.
- 2003 "Recent Paintings," Museum of Contemporary Art, Miami, FL.
- 2002 Victoria Miro Gallery, London, England.
- 303 Gallery, New York, NY.
- 2000 Mary Boone Gallery, New York, NY.
- 1999 Deitch Projects, New York, NY.
- "American Landscape: Recent Paintings by Inka Essenhigh," Albright Knox Art Gallery, Buffalo, NY.
- 1998 "Pop Surrealism," Aldrich Contemporary Art Museum, Ridgefield, CT.

== Collections ==
Essenhigh's work is included in the following art collections:

- Albright Knox Art Gallery, Buffalo, New York, U.S.
- Denver Art Museum, Denver, Colorado, U.S.
- Museum of Contemporary Art, North Miami, Florida, U.S.
- Museum of Modern Art, New York City, New York, U.S.
- Smithsonian American Art Museum, Washington, D.C., U.S.
- Seattle Art Museum, Seattle, Washington, U.S.
- Tate Modern, London, England
- Virginia Museum of Fine Arts, Richmond, Virginia, U.S.
- Whitney Museum of American Art, New York City, New York, U.S.
