= Jonny Martinez =

American singer

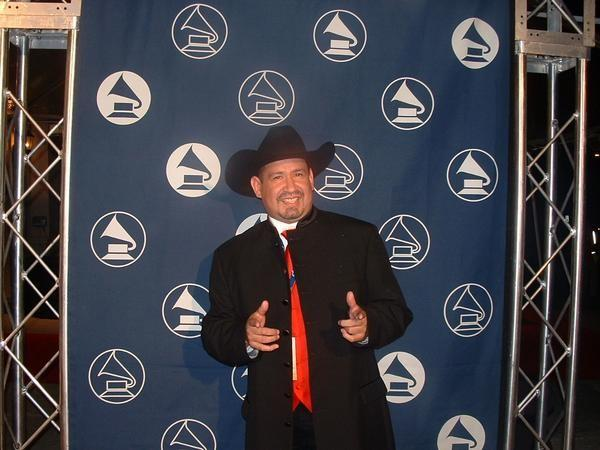

Background information
- Born: John Martin Martinez; May 6, 1969 (age 57)
- Origin: San Antonio, Texas
- Genres: Tejano, country, Tex-Mex
- Instruments: Vocalist, guitar
- Years active: 1986–2026
- Label: AMI Records Latin
- Members: Chris Arocha, Mike Hernandez, Pete "Tiny" Gutierrez, Art Guillermo, Stevie Ray and John Michael Martinez.
- Past members: Victor Hernandez, Al Avila, Danny Rodriguez, Ernie Gonzalez, Art Guillermo, JP Munoz, Isaac Martinez, Andy Bernal, Joey Trevino, Raul Villarreal, Larry Villanueva, Victor Hernandez, Edward Mendoza, Eddie Rivas, Adam Arispe, Marc Martinez, Danny Rodriguez, J.P. Munoz, Mario Hernandez, Memo Rincon, Esteban Cerda, Steve Lujan, Ruben Garcia, Joey Sanchez, Roy Paniagua, Russel Hernandez, Mike Hernandez, Ralph Pastrano, Eddie Rivas, Marc Martinez, Art Hernandez, Rudy Cortez, Leroy Salazar, George Avena, Andy Bernal, Leno Sanchez, Frank Flores, Steve Gonzalez, Anthony Hernandez, Greg Enriquez, Leroy Esparza, Steve Perez.
- Website: http://www.jonnymartinez.net

Jonny Martinez (born John Martin Martinez, May 6, 1969- March 12, 2026 San Antonio, Texas) is an American Tejano/country singer, producer, arranger, composer, and songwriter, based in Austin, Texas. He has positioned himself as an independent artist who is interested in recording authentic Tejano, Tex-Mex and country music. He has been recording since 1988, to include "Caminos Chuecos" (1995 Joey International), "Ron Con Coca Cola" (1998 Joey International), "Mujer Mexicana" (2001 AMI Records Latin), "La Callejera" (2004 AMI Records Latin), "Lo Mejor de Jonny Martinez" (AMI Records Latin 2007) "Dedicado A Mi Madre" (2010 AMI Records Latin)and "Admirando a Mi Padre" (2015 AMI Records Latin). Martinez, owner and producer of AMI Records Latin, signed Rebecca Valadez in 2005 and received a Grammy Award nomination in 2006 for Best Tejano Album. In 2007, he also participated as a recording engineer for Ram Herrera, in which the CD was nominated for Best Tejano Album. In 2008 & 2009, Martinez was involved in yet two more CD projects as an engineer with Grammy Nominations under Sunny Sauceda for Tejas Records.

Martinez is following in the footsteps of his father, Tejano Hall of Fame inductee Anselmo "El Chemiro" Martinez, who has traveled coast to coast, recording 13 albums, writing hundreds of world Tejano music and currently singing and writing Christian music with compositions of 146 original songs. Jonny Martinez has ventured into 28 U.S. states, covering Mexico by touring in Monterrey, San Luis, Potosi and Durango.

By age 16, had his debut on-air radio broadcast on San Antonio’s KEDA-AM radio station, where he sang an old standard hit "La Bamba", and was interviewed by Guero Polkas on KEDA in San Antonio, Texas. In January 1990, Martinez won the All campus Southwest Texas State Talent show as a Sigma Nu by singing his rendition of "La Bamba" and "Twist and Shout". Martinez altered those skills with his father by recording an album on Carino Records, with his new group called John Martinez y Carino. Martinez continued his education at Missouri Valley College and graduated in 1992 with a Bachelor of Arts in Communications and an MBA from University of Phoenix. The singer was anxious to record again and began soon after graduating. After interning at Custom Recording Studio with Toby Torres, Jonny Martinez began working as an audio engineer by recording Flaco Jimenez. Joey Records signed two solo artists on July 6, 1994; Jonny Martinez and Michael Salgado.

== Discography ==
Albums in order from newest to oldest

=== Borracho Y Perdido ===
1. Borracho Y Perdido
2. Mi Tesoro
3. Por Cuanto Me Lo Da
4. Quiero Que Sepas
5. El Cafetal
6. Cumbia De La Guitarra (ReMix)

=== Admirando A Mi Padre ===
1. Caminos Chuecos
2. Un Raton
3. Hasta Que Llegaste tu
4. El Paraiso
5. Amorcito Consentido
6. No Olvides Que te Quiero
7. Mi Nombre Completo
8. Jamaican Mi Crazy
9. Anoche
10. Te Quiero Dar Mi Amor
11. Mi Ranchito
12. Los Laureles

=== Dedicado A Mi Madre ===
1. Mi Lindo Tesoro
2. Fijate Mama/La Mucura/La Media Naranja/
3. Dos Ojas Sin Rumbo
4. Maria Isabel
5. Margaritaville
6. No Volvere
7. Cowboy Cumbia
8. Muy Grande
9. I've Got a Never Ending Love
10. Por El Amor A Mi Madre
11. Con Mis Ojos Llorosos
12. Un Presentimiento
13. Jingle Bells

=== Lo Mejor De Jonny Martinez y Mas ===
1. Mi Florecita
2. Mujer Mexicana
3. Cumbia Barriente
4. Mujer Paseada
5. Rosa Maria
6. Caminos Chuecos
7. Para Que Quiero Tus Besos
8. Esa Morenita
9. Nadie Nos Separara
10. La Musiquera
11. Libro Abierto
12. Cumbia De La Guitarra
13. Tu Te Vas
14. Ritmo De La Ola
15. Chaparrita De Oro
16. Fiesta Sabrosura
17. Tu Traicion
18. Boom Boom Boom
19. Nuestro Amor
20. La Callejera
21. El Cafetal

=== La Callejera ===
1. Ni Los Pleatos
2. La Callejera
3. Nuestro Amor
4. Tu Tracion
5. Cumbia de la Guitarra
6. Fiesta Sabrosura
7. Esa Morenita
8. Victors Special #1
9. Boom Boom Boom
10. Pobre

=== Mujer Mexicana ===
1. Mujer Mexicana
2. El Cafetal
3. Mujer Paseada
4. Libro Abierto
5. Mi Guerita
6. Que Linda Mujer
7. La Suegra
8. Simon Blanco
9. Tengo Un Amorcito
10. Cambiar de Camino

=== Ron Con Coca Cola ===
1. Ron Con Coca Cola
2. Chaparrita De Oro
3. Tu Amor
4. Cambiar De Camino
5. Tengo Un Amorcito
6. Ni Tu Ni Nadie Mas
7. Rodeo Palace
8. Bravomania
9. Mi Guerita
10. Hijo De Tejas

=== Caminos Chuecos ===
1. Caminos Chuecos
2. La Musiquera
3. Pinte Mi Cuarto
4. Ritmo De la Ola
5. Nadie Nos Separara
6. Viejo Libro
7. Tu Retrato
8. Porque sin ti
9. Que Lindos Ojos
10. Me Enamore

=== Que Bonita ===
1. Que Bonita
2. Que Bonitos Ojos Tienes
3. Cuando Estare
4. Como
5. Cambiar De Camino
6. Ratoncito
7. Que Hare Yo
8. Negrita Linda
9. Carinito
10. Nuestros Besos
