= Steve Mumford =

American painter

Steve Mumford (born 1960) is an American painter. His practice has recently included the depiction of scenes from American wars in Iraq and Afghanistan. Typically he works in large, realist oil paintings, as well as watercolor on paper. He is the son of mathematician David Mumford.

== Education ==
Mumford received his M.F.A. in 1994 at the School of Visual Arts, New York. There, he met Inka Essenhigh, whom he would later marry, as well as artists Michelle Lopez and Michael Lazarus.

== Career ==
Mumford entered Iraq on April 9, 2003, the day the statue of Saddam Hussein was toppled in Baghdad, and he has periodically returned to the region to document the daily lives of both Iraqi citizens and American soldiers. These works were published, along with journalistic text by Mumford, in a book released through Drawn & Quarterly. Steve made drawing trips to Iraq and Afghanistan during the war in 2003, 2004, 2007, 2008, 2010 and 2011. He was sometimes embedded, sometimes independent, always attempting to draw from life. Besides war, events he has drawn for Harpers include the BP oil spill, rallies for Donald Trump, POWs at Guantanamo, soldiers recovering at Walter Reed and Brooke Army Medical Center, and most recently, Covid scenes from NYC as well as looting and BLM protests in NYC and Portland, OR. He often makes oil paintings based on the subjects he’s drawn.

In April 2007, a major exhibition of his war works was held at the Pritzker Military Library in Chicago. Mumford is represented by Postmasters Gallery in New York City.

In 2013, Mumford made paintings of the Guantanamo Bay detention camp.

His work was exhibited “Steve Mumford’s War Journals” at the Frist Center for the Visual Arts in Nashville, Tennessee through June 8, 2014.

Mumford's painting "Dying Soldier" was in the exhibition "Theater of Operations: The Gulf Wars 1991-2011" through March 1, 2020 at PS 1 in Long Island City, New York.

== Personal life and family ==
Mumford lives in New York City and is married to artist Inka Essenhigh.

== Bibliography ==
- Mumford, Steve. Baghdad Journal: An Artist in Occupied Iraq. Montreal: Drawn & Quarterly Books, 2005. ISBN 1896597904
