= Wibod =

Wibod (or Guibod) (Italian: Wibodo or Guibodo) (died 895) was the Bishop of Parma from 855 until his death. He was, during the reigns of Louis II, Carloman, Charles III, and Berengar I, the most important power-broker in Emilia.

Wibod was a frequent ambassador for Louis II after 860. He and a count named Bernard were the delegates of Louis II who, along with two suburbicarian bishops and a cardinal priest of Pope Hadrian II, formed an embassy to Louis the German at Aachen in October 870. This embassy brought letters confirming Hadrian's support of Louis in the conflict surrounding the succession to Lotharingia and the consecration of Willibert as Archbishop of Cologne. Wibod acted as an ambassador for Louis II and Engelberga again in 872.

Wibod was the first recipient Italian bishop of an extension of his saecular authority of districtio (defence) beyond his city's walls, from Carloman. The extension of temporal episcopal authority in the civitates (cities) and their comitati (counties) became a trend in the 10th century. Wibod was also a recipient of Charles' largess. Charles granted Wibod land around Susinate and Vigonzone. These lands probably served as country homes for the bishop when conferring with Charles while the latter was breaking from royal duties in Pavia.

Wibod was the "highest counsellor" or consiliarius regis of Charles. His influence and power in Italy far exceeded that of the king's favourite and chancellor, Liutward of Vercelli. He consequently attended the West Frankish coronation and imperial assembly at Grand on 20 May 885.

During the contests for the Italian throne following Charles' death in 888, Wibod preferred the German and German-supported candidates over the French ones. He consistently backed Berengar against the Guideschi claimants, but he was won over to the French side by the entreaties of Anselm II, Archbishop of Milan.

== Sources ==
- Wickham, Chris. Early Medieval Italy: Central Power and Local Society 400-1000. MacMillan Press: 1981.
- MacLean, Simon. Kingship and Politics in the Late Ninth Century: Charles the Fat and the end of the Carolingian Empire. Cambridge University Press: 2003.
- Reuter, Timothy (trans.) The Annals of Fulda. (Manchester Medieval series, Ninth-Century Histories, Volume II.) Manchester: Manchester University Press, 1992.
