= Anselm II (archbishop of Milan) =

Archbishop of Milan from 882 to 896

Anselm I
- Died: 896
- Other names: Latin: Anselmus; Italian: Anselmo
- Occupation: archbishop of Milan
- Years active: 882–896
- Known for: leader of the West Frankish party

Anselm II Capra (Latin: Anselmus; Italian: Anselmo; d. 896) was the archbishop of Milan from 882 until his death. He was the leader of the West Frankish party against the East Frankish in the Italian politics of his day. He opposed Berengar of Friuli and supported crowning the Frank Guy III of Spoleto as King of Italy after the deposition of Charles the Fat. He eventually prevailed, by his ecclesiastic influence winning over the pro-German bishops, such as Wibod of Parma. Collectio Anselmo Dedicata was dedicated to him.

== See also ==
- Other Anselms

== Sources ==
- Wickham, Chris. Early Medieval Italy: Central Power and Local Society 400-1000. MacMillan Press: 1981.
- Ghisalberti, Alberto M. Dizionario Biografico degli Italiani: III Ammirato – Arcoleo. Rome, 1961.
