= Mapudungun alphabet =

Proposed orthographies for the indigenous language

Mapudungun, the language of the Mapuche of modern south-central Chile and southwestern Argentina, did not have a writing system when the Spanish arrived. There have been a number of proposals for orthographies or Mapudungun alphabets, all of them using Latin script, but no consensus has yet been achieved between authorities, linguists and Mapuche communities on the one to be used.

The main systems (in order of proposal) are the following:

- Classic, used since 1890 by Rodolfo Lenz, Félix José de Augusta and Ernesto Wilhelm de Moesbach; among other corpora for the biographic narrations provided by Pascual Coña in 1926.
- Alfabeto Mapuche Unificado ("Unified Alphabet"), used by Chilean and Mapuche linguists and used in most of the scientific literature about the language.
- Grafemario Raguileo, made by Anselmo Raguileo Lincopil (1922–1992), who was a linguist of Mapuche origin. This orthography is supported by the indigenous Mapuche organization Council of All Lands.
- Nhewenh, an online proposal by Heinrich Puschmann, based on the Latin character set to facilitate international usage on the Internet.
- Azumchefi (also called Azümchefe), proposed by the Corporación Nacional de Desarrollo Indígena (CONADI) as a summary of about six earlier proposals, and recognized by the Chilean Ministry of Education, but not widely used.
- Wirizüŋun, of unknown origin.

A more thorough look at the sounds of Mapudungun is available here.

== Consonants ==
Mapudungun has the following consonant system.

Phoneme	Classic	Unified Alphabet	Ragileo	Nhewenh	Azumchefi	Wirizüŋun
/p/	p					
/t̪/	t·	ṯ	t*	td	t'	ṫ (or td)
/t/	t					
/k/	k					
/tʃ/	ch	ch	c	c	ch	ch
/tʂ/ (Note: /ʈʂ/, which is spelled "tr", is also pronounced [tɻ].)	tr	tr	x	tr	tx	tr
/f/	f					
/θ/	d	d	z	sd	z	z
/s/	s	s	s (Note: Raguileo does not distinguish between /s/ and /ʃ/ or between /t̪/ and /t/. Also, Raguileo aims to use only one grapheme for each phoneme (no digraphs) so it uses some letters from the alphabet in an unexpected way. Wirizüŋun also does not distinguish between /s/ and /ʃ/.)	s	s	s
/ʃ/	sh	sh	s	sh	sh	s
/m/	m					
/n̪/	n·	ṉ	h	nd	nh	ṅ (or nd)
/n/	n					
/ɲ/	ñ	ñ	ñ	nh	ñ	ñ (or nh)
/ŋ/	ŋ	ng	g	g	g	ŋ (or ng)
onset /w/	w					
coda /u/	u	w	w	u	w	w
onset /j/	y	y	y	j	y	y
coda /i/	i	y	y	i	y	y
/ɣ/	q	g	q	q	q	g
/ɻ/	r					
/l̪/	l·	ḻ	b	ld	lh	ŀ (or ld)
/l/	l					
/ʎ/	ll	ll	j	lh	ll	lh

== Vowels ==
Mapudungun has six vowels. The three high vowels also have corresponding approximant consonants.

Phoneme	Classic	Unified Alphabet	Ragileo	Nhewenh	Azumchefi	Wirizüŋun
/a/	a					
/e/	e					
/i/	i					
/o/	o					
/u/	u					
/ɨ/	ü / ë / .	ü	v	y (or v)	ü	ü (or v)

== Bibliography ==
- Sadowsky, Scott; Painequeo, Héctor; Salamanca, Gastón; Avelino, Heriberto (2013), "Mapudungun", Journal of the International Phonetic Association, 43 (1): 87–96, doi:10.1017/S0025100312000369, archived from the original on 2022-04-25
