= Hansel (disambiguation) =

Hansel is one of the main characters in the Brothers Grimm fairy tale Hansel and Gretel.

Hansel may also refer to:

== People ==
=== Given name ===
- Hansel Enmanuel (born 2003), Dominican basketball player
- Hansel Izquierdo (born 1977), Cuban baseball player
- Hansel Marcelino (born 2002), Dominican baseball player
- Hansel Mieth (1909–1998), German photojournalist
- Hansel Ochieng (born 1995), Kenyan footballer
- Hansel Robles (born 1990), Dominican baseball player
- Hansel Zapata (born 1995), Colombian footballer

=== Surname ===
- C. E. M. Hansel (1917–2011), British psychologist
- Deeann Hansel (born 1962), American tennis player
- Frank-Christian Hansel (born 1964), German politician
- Heike Hänsel (born 1966), German politician
- Howell Hansel (1860–1917), American film director
- Marion Hänsel (1949–2020), Belgian film director, producer, actress and screenwriter
- Peter Hänsel (1770–1831), German composer and violinist
- Phil Hansel (1925–2010), American swimming coach

== Other uses ==
- Hansel Ltd., the central procurement unit of the Finnish government
- Hansel (horse), an American thoroughbred racehorse
- main character in the fairy tale Gambling Hansel
- Hansel, a fictional character in the 2001 film Zoolander, played by Owen Wilson
- Hansel, a village in Ayrshire, Scotland
- Hansel, a Filipino biscuit brand of Republic Biscuit Corporation

== See also ==
- Ansel (disambiguation)
- Hanzel (disambiguation), a given name and surname
