= Julius Ansel =

American politician (1908–1965)

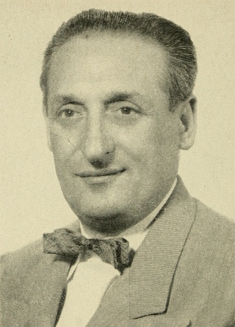
Julius Ansel

Julius Ansel (March 27, 1908 – March 13, 1965) was an American politician who was a member of the Boston City Council from 1948 to 1951, the Massachusetts House of Representatives from 1953 to 1955 and again from 1959 to 1965, and the Massachusetts Senate in 1965. He was an unsuccessful candidate for Mayor of Boston in 1963.

Ansel was born in Vilnius, Russian Empire, to Hyman Ansel, who worked as a grocer in Boston, and Bertha Ansel. He immigrated to the United States in 1910 and became a citizen in the 1920s. He left school after the eighth grade. He was wounded in France during World War II and was awarded the Bronze Star.

Ansel died in Carney Hospital in Dorchester, aged 57, after suffering a heart attack. A much beloved figure in Boston, Ansel's death brought out thousands of people who mourned him at services at Congregation Agudath Israel in Dorchester and Levine Chapel in Brookline. Then-Governor John A. Volpe attended his funeral along with former governors Foster Furcolo and Endicott Peabody. The Boston Globe noted that along with politicians, "There were judges and there were clergy, Negro and white, Protestant, Catholic and Jew. There were police officers and sheriffs. There were humble men and women. Ansel had touched the life of many people." His widow, Lillian, received a telegram from President Lyndon B. Johnson with the message, "Mrs. Johnson and I are grieved and saddened at the death of your husband. He was a distinguished public servant, a good husband, my valued friend."

== See also ==
- 1953–1954 Massachusetts legislature
- 1959–1960 Massachusetts legislature
