= Anselmo Martinez =

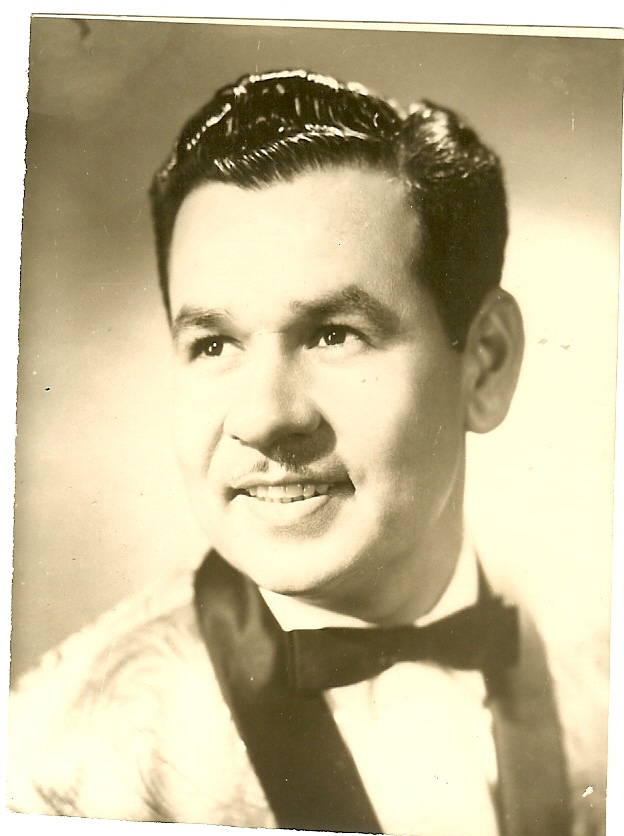

Background information
- Born: Anselmo Martínez; April 21, 1927; Dunlay, Texas, U.S.
- Died: July 18, 2020 (aged 93) San Antonio, Texas, U.S.
- Genres: Tejano
- Instrument: Vocals
- Years active: 1949-???, 2015-2017

Anselmo "El Chemiro" Martínez (April 21, 1927 – July 18, 2020) was a Tejano singer and songwriter. Martínez gained prominence in the mid-1960s recording orchestra music influenced by Glenn Miller and subsequently introducing the style coast to coast as he toured and recorded original compositions. He had released 13 albums and 248 original songs, performing into his 80s and writing 261 Gospel songs, and releasing 5 gospel CDs. He was the President of The Guadalupanos at St. Gabriel’s Church. Anselmo “El Chemiro” Martínez was an inductee to the TTMA Tejano Hall of Fame.

== Career ==
Born in Dunlay, Texas and raised in the Central part of Texas, Martinez followed in his father Jesus Martínez' footsteps, originally from Morelos, Coahuila, Mexico. In 1949, he began with a small Conjunto called Conjunto Gauna and debut their performance on KVOU radio in Uvalde, Texas. He slowly began climbing the charts with his original hit "Caminos Chuecos" on 45 rpm record with the recording called "Nadie Nos Separara" on flip side.

In the late 1960s, Anselmo Martínez was at the pinnacle of his career with an orchestrated sound of trumpets and saxophones combined with his own original style. Inspired by the Glenn Miller Band during his younger years, Martínez incorporated his written arrangements to accompany more than 250 Spanish compositions of his own. Traveling the United States from Coast to Coast for more than 15 years, Anselmo Martínez has performed extensively in 40 states.

Martínez released "Admirando A mi padre" under AMI Music Group in San Antonio, Texas. This recording is a father-and-son release with producer and label CEO Jonny Martinez and hearkens back to Anselmo's career by re-recording Caminos Chuecos and some of his major hits along with the orchestra style of the 1950s that Martínez recorded.

At the age of 88, Martínez was included in the Tejano Legends Cruise to perform on Carnival Cruise Lines in January 2016.

Martinez died on July 18, 2020, at the age of 93.

== Discography ==
Albums in order from newest to oldest

=== Admirando A Mi Padre ===
1. Caminos Chuecos
2. Un Raton
3. Hasta Que Llegaste
4. El Paraiso
5. Amorcito Consentido
6. No Olvides Que te quiero
7. Mi Nombre Completo
8. Jamaican me Crazy
9. Anoche
10. Te Quiero Dar Mi Amor
11. Mi Ranchito
12. Los Laureles

=== Caminos Chuecos ===
1. Caminos Chuecos
2. Carino Santo
3. Un Amor que se quiere
4. LLoro Por ti
5. Nuestros Besos
6. Nadie Nos Separara
7. I'm in the mood for love
8. El Mar el la esperanza
9. Besame
10. Te Vi La Prueba
11. No Me sigas enganado

=== Se Vale La Pena ===
1. No Quiero Seguir Sufriendo
2. Que Bonito
3. Ahora Que Tengo Dinero
4. La Yegua Ajena
5. Volver Volver
6. Hay Unos Ojos
7. Tu Tienes La Culpa
8. Me Toco Perder
9. Cuenta Aparte
10. Dile
11. Mal Pasado De Amor
12. Hasta El Fin
13. Quedo Triste Y Abandonado
14. Leyenda Macabra
15. Tristes Corazones
16. Me Cambio Por El Dinero
17. Aunque Estes Tan Lejos

=== El Chemiro ===
1. Te Quiero Te Extraño
2. Dueña De Mi Corazon
3. Prison De Botellas
4. El Panadero
5. Me Agarro Contigo
6. Sirveme Otra Cantinero
7. Rosalva De Leon
8. Perdoname
9. Morena De Mi Vida
10. Pobre Desdichado
11. Tu Retrato
12. Entre Botellas De Vino
13. Por Tu Culpa
14. Corrido
15. Me Ha Robado El Corazon
16. Harto

=== El Trovador Tejano ===
1. La Cruz De Vidrio
2. La Condena
3. Esta Noche Me Encuentro Borracho
4. El Indio
5. Maldita Suerte
6. El Bilongo
7. Mi Cielo Gris
8. Mi Ultimo Trago
9. Llore Llore
10. Voy A Navegar
11. Lleno De Recuerdos
12. Prefiero Morir
13. Copa Tras Copa
14. La Ultima Botella
15. La Novedad

== Honors ==
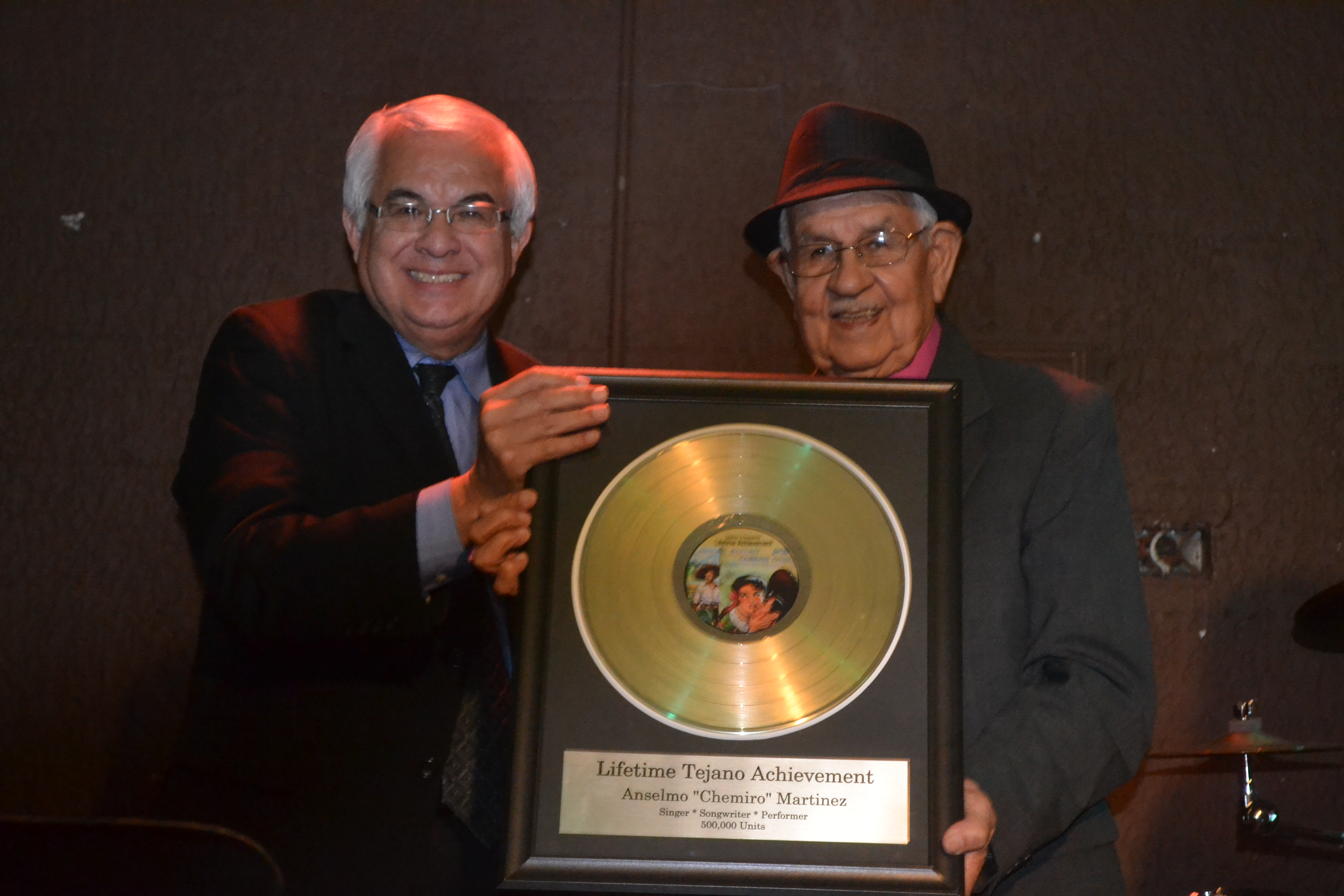
TTMA present to give Anselmo Martínez Lifetime Achievement Award 2012

- Tejano Music Awards (1984) – "Inducted into Hall of Fame"
- Radio Latin Charts (1964) – "Single of the Year" for "Caminos Chuecos"
- Tejano Music Hall of Fame (1987)
- Texas Musicians Museum Hall of Fame(2010)
- Austin Museum of Arts(2011)
- Gold Album Award for Lifetime Achievement (2012)
