= Steven Ansell =

American violist

Steven A. Ansell (born February 5, 1954) is an American violist whose career involves work as a chamber musician, solo artist, and orchestral musician. He is the principal violist with the Boston Symphony Orchestra, a position he has held since September 1996. Prior to his appointment, Ansell had already appeared with the orchestra as a guest soloist. He also teaches at the Boston University College of Fine Arts and is a member of the Boston Symphony Chamber Players. He is a founding member of the Muir String Quartet.

== Biography ==
Ansell is a native of Seattle, Washington. He graduated from the Curtis Institute of Music at the age of 21. While at Curtis, Ansell studied with Michael Tree and Karen Tuttle. Immediately following graduation, Ansell was hired as a professor of viola at the University of Houston. He left the university two years later at the age of 23 to become assistant principal violist of the Pittsburgh Symphony Orchestra under André Previn.

Ansell has appeared with chamber music organizations such as the Boston Chamber Music Society and the Concord Chamber Music Society. He also regularly tours with the Muir String Quartet, which he co-founded in 1979. In January 2011, Ansell and the Quartet performed with former U.S. Secretary of State and pianist Condoleezza Rice.

Ansell's solo appearances include Mozart's Sinfonia Concertante with Malcolm Lowe under the baton of André Previn; Berlioz's Harold in Italy with Emmanuel Krivine; Bruch's Concerto for Viola, Clarinet and Orchestra with Seiji Ozawa; and Strauss's Don Quixote with Mstislav Rostropovich. Ansell has also performed in concert with many other musicians and conductors like Yo-Yo Ma, Steven Isserlis, Rafael Frühbeck de Burgos, and Jian Wang. He is a contributing editor to the Chicago-based online string music company Ovation Press.

Ansell has done solo work with many ensembles including Sinfonia Concertante, the Boston Classical Orchestra and the Boston Symphony Orchestra. He has also performed at music festivals such as Tanglewood Music Festival, Schleswig-Holstein Musik Festival, Marlboro Music Festival, Blossom Music Festival, Newport Music Festival, and Festival dei Due Mondi.
