= Anselmo (footballer, born 1967) =

Brazilian footballer

Personal information
- Full name: Anselmo Luís Rodrigues
- Date of birth: 4 December 1967 (age 58)
- Place of birth: Guaxupé, Brazil
- Position: Goalkeeper

Youth career
- –1988: Caldense

Senior career*
Years	Team	Apps	(Gls)
1988	Caldense		
1989–1990	São Paulo	13	(0)
1991	XV de Piracicaba		
1992	Londrina		
1992	Ponte Preta		
1993	São Caetano		
1994–1995	XV de Piracicaba		
1995	Ceará		(1)
1996–1997	Coritiba		
1998	Santo André		
1999	Mogi Mirim		
1999	Botafogo-SP		
2000	Mogi Mirim		
- * Club domestic league appearances and goals as of 27 October 2023

Anselmo Luís Rodrigues (born 4 December 1967), simply known as Anselmo, is a Brazilian former professional footballer who played as a goalkeeper.

== Career ==
Originally from Minas Gerais, Anselmo was one of the promises used by São Paulo in the 1989 Campeonato Paulista. He played for several other teams, most notably Coritiba.

Anselmo scored a penalty against Desportiva, at 1995 Campeonato Brasileiro Série B.

== Honours ==
São Paulo

- Campeonato Paulista: 1989

Coritiba

- Festival Brasileiro de Futebol: 1996
