= Anselmo Piccoli =

Argentine Abstract artist

Anselmo Piccoli (September 4, 1915 – July 12, 1992) was an Argentine Abstract artist.

== Life and work ==
Anselmo Piccoli was born in Rosario, Argentina in 1915. Politically active as a Socialist during secondary school, Piccoli found time to attend the local Gaspary Academy, where he was trained as a painter. There, he met Antonio Berni, an increasingly well-known Figurative artist, in 1932, and Berni became a mentor to the promising young artist. The two began a collaboration on Wounded Man, presented jointly at the local Autumn Art Festival of 1935. The mural, performed in lacquer blown through a tube, proved to be a lasting percent for Piccoli by way of its texture. His work was awarded at a competition in Rosario in 1941 and he joined the Independent Artists' Group, a local guild in 1942. The following year, Piccoli was awarded his first personal art exhibition at Rosario's prestigious Juan B. Castagnino Fine Arts Museum.

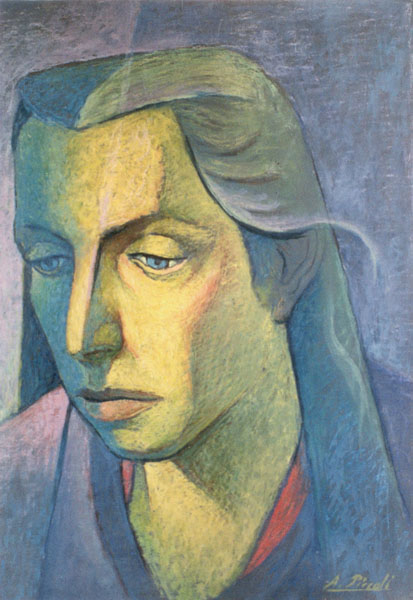
Lydia, oil on metal plate, 1959

Piccoli married Lydia Langbart in 1944 and, relocating to the Buenos Aires suburb of Burzaco, he devoted himself to family and, though he continued to paint, his art show appearances became less frequent. He was awarded numerous prestigious prizes, notably the inclusion in 1954 of a selection of his work at the Emilio Caraffa Fine Arts Museum in Córdoba. His technique continued to evolve during this interim and, creating a portrait of his wife in 1959, his use of geometry marked a clear trend in his work towards Constructivism. Collecting a body of geometrically defined work, Piccoli obtained an exhibition in 1969, his first show as a painter in this genre.

Piccoli made himself more available to art galleries in the following years, and he garnered numerous awards. Creating increasingly Figurative art, a genre popularized in Argentina during the 1970s by Eduardo Mac Entyre, his work was presented in a retrospective at the Wildenstein Gallery of Buenos Aires in 1983. His work continued to receive accolades, including the Grand Prize at the National Art Show of 1984.

Continuing to paint, he died in 1992 at age 76. His widow donated Rhythms in Aluminum, his last work, to the Castagnino Art Museum in Rosario in 2004, on the occasion of their inaugural of a contemporary art branch.
