= Anselmo Raguileo Lincopil =

Chilean historian

Anselmo Raguileo Lincopil (3 May 1922 - 29 February 1992) was a Chilean linguist, historian, researcher and poet of the Mapuche people. He developed the Raguileo Alfabet.

== Life ==
Raguileo Anselmo was born May 3, 1922, in Saltapura, Chile, 16 kilometers southeast of Nueva Imperial. His primary studies were at the Boroa Mission School and later at Missionary Padre Las Casas. He did his secondary studies at the Industrial School of Temuco, graduating in Metallurgy Office Technician.

Raguileo Anselmo later he moved to Santiago to study chemistry at the School of Arts and Crafts. He graduated as a Chemist in 1944. From 1952 to 1956, Raguileo Anselmo studied linguistics and was a language teacher. He Mapuche culture in the Pedagogical Institute of the University of Chile.
