= Charles Ansell =

British actuary (1794–1881)

- Born: 8 December 1794; Paddington, Middlesex, England
- Died: 14 December 1881 (aged 87); Brighton, Sussex, England
- Citizenship: British

Charles James Ansell (8 December 1794 – 1881 in Paddington, Middlesex, England) was a British actuary.

== Background ==
In 1808, 14 year-old Charles Ansell was hired on with the Atlas Fire and Life Assurance Company. Ansell would stay with Atlas for more than 56 years, remaining even after his retirement in 1864 when he became a consultant to the company. He rose in authority during his employment until in 1823 he became actuary of the company's life branch. He served similarly at National Provident, the Friends' Provident and the Clergy Mutual Life Office. In 1834, he became a Fellow of the Royal Society.

== Publishing and advisement ==
In 1835, Ansell published A Treatise On Friendly Societies through Society for the Diffusion of Useful Knowledge, a compilation of information related to the illnesses and mortality rates of the working class of England. According to the Oxford Dictionary of National Biography, this treatise "was probably the first rigorous examination of the subject", contributing to the professional success that ultimately led to his being known as "the father of his profession" in the final years of his life.

As a specialist in the subject, Charles Ansell was a sometimes financial advisor for British government, including Parliament. He was described in 1864 by William Ewart Gladstone as "one of the most eminent authorities among actuaries". In his older years, he served as Deputy Lieutenant of Merionethshire.

== Death and legacy ==
Charles Ansell died 14 December 1881, aged 87 years. He was buried in Brighton cemetery. Ansell's legacy persisted in his family: His eldest son and namesake, himself the actuary of National Provident for over three decades beginning in 1852, authored On the Rate of Mortality in 1874; in 1885, Hubert Ansell, who was one of Ansell's grandchildren, became a fellow of the Institute of Actuaries.
