= Mary Ansell =

English murderer

Mary Ann Ansell, a housemaid, was hanged at St Albans Prison, England on 19 July 1899, for poisoning her sister Caroline, who was an inmate in an asylum. Her motive was asserted to be to obtain £11.5s from a life insurance policy which she had taken out on Caroline. She sent her a small piece of cake or pastry, like a flat jam sandwich, the middle of which was very yellow and contained phosphorus poison. Her sister had been an inmate at Leavesden Asylum in Abbots Langley.

At 18 or 22 years old (reports differ), she was the youngest woman to be hanged in the UK in the 'modern era' (after the 1868 reform act, so non-public, and also by the 'long drop' method).

Before Ansell's execution, there was considerable public pressure for a reprieve, on the grounds of her sex, youth, and perceived lack of mental capacity (both of herself, and of other members of her family). The Metropolitan Asylums Board passed a resolution calling for clemency. Some newspapers, including the Daily Mail under the headline "A One-sided Investigation", asked for a reprieve. Three questions were asked in the House of Commons in relation to her case, and more than 100 MPs signed a petition that her life be spared. However, the Home Office was unwilling to reprieve a poisoner, this murder being considered a premeditated act, and poisoning an especially heinous crime under English law.

In 1900, her case was cited in an academic study of the limits to criminal responsibility.
