= Barry Ansell =

English footballer

Personal information
- Full name: Barry Ansell
- Date of birth: 29 September 1947
- Place of birth: Birmingham, England
- Date of death: 2 March 2018 (aged 70)
- Place of death: South Africa
- Position: Full back

Senior career*
Years	Team	Apps	(Gls)
1967–1968	Aston Villa	1	(0)
- Arcadia Shepherds
- * Club domestic league appearances and goals

Barry Ansell (29 September 1947 – 2 March 2018) was an English footballer who played in the Football League for Aston Villa. And later became a successful property developer in South Africa.

He was a race horse enthusiast and spent his last years of retirement at his golf estate home in Fancourt South Africa.

Barry Ansell had 6 children: Mark, Sacha, Glen, Amy-lou, Kerry-Lee and Scott.

Grandchildren : Tayla, Kyra, Peta and Mickey.

He was married to Deidre Ansell when he died in 2018.
