= Anselmo Zarza Bernal =

Mexican Roman Catholic bishop

Bishop Anselmo Zarza Bernal
- Bishop Emeritus of León, Guanajuato
- Church: Roman Catholic Church
- Diocese: León
- Appointed: 1966
- Term ended: 1992
- Previous post: Bishop of Linares, Nuevo León (1962–1966)

Orders
- Ordination: 1939

Personal details
- Born: June 4, 1916 Atlixco, Puebla, Mexico
- Died: April 15, 2014 (aged 97) León, Guanajuato, Mexico

Anselmo Zarza Bernal (June 4, 1916 – April 15, 2014) was a Mexican bishop in the Roman Catholic Church. Bernal was born in Atlixco, Puebla in June 1916. He was ordained a priest in 1939. He was the Bishop of Linares, Nuevo León, from 1962 to 1966 and the Bishop of León, Guanajuato, from 1966 to 1992. Bernal died in León, Guanajuato in April 2014 at the age of 97.
