= Ansells End =

Hamlet in Hertfordshire, England

Coordinates: 51.856°N 00.316°W

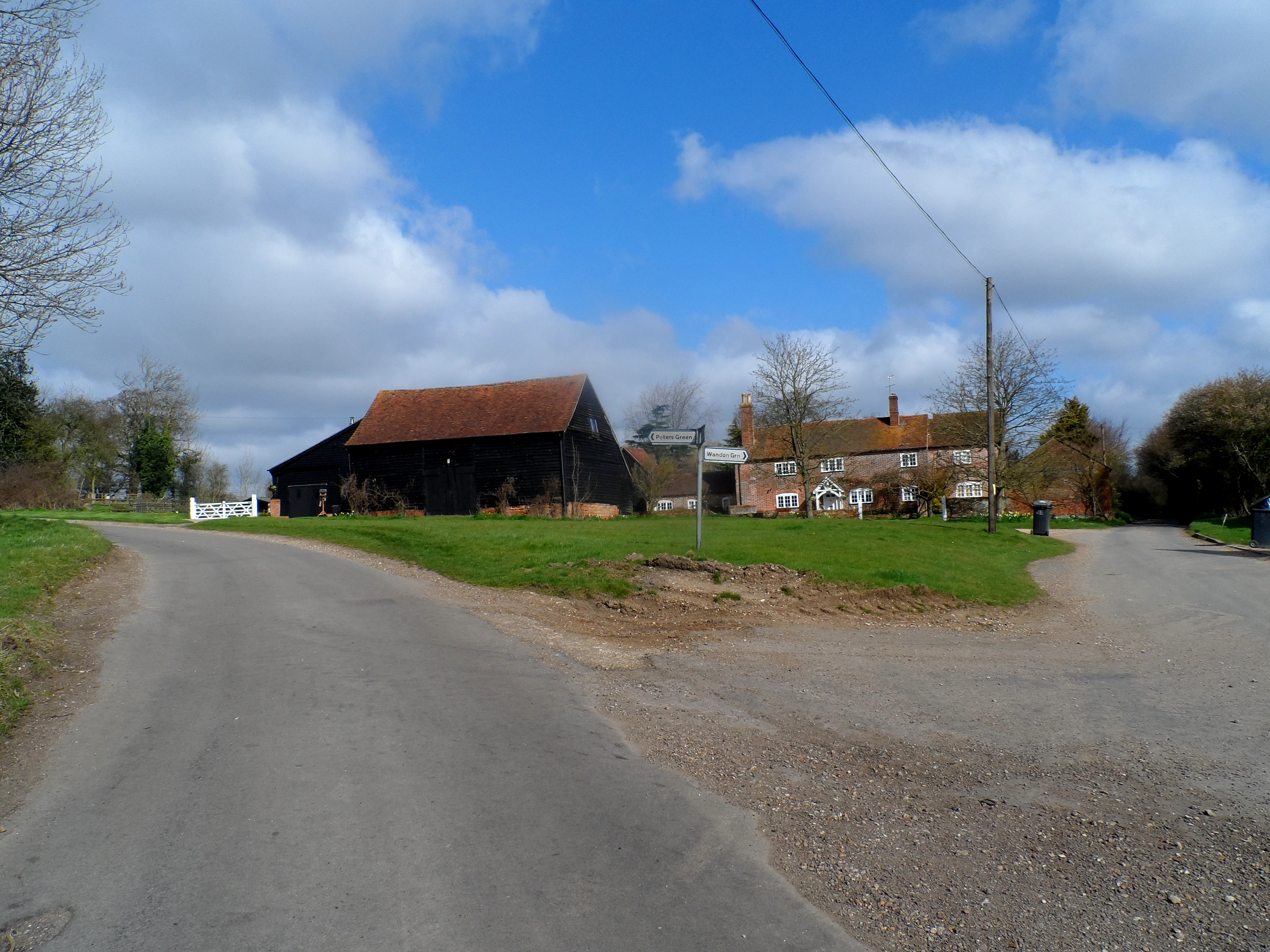

- Location within Hertfordshire
- OS grid reference: TL1518
- Shire county: Hertfordshire
- Region: East
- Country: England
- Sovereign state: United Kingdom
- Post town: Luton
- Postcode district: LU2
- Police: Hertfordshire
- Fire: Hertfordshire
- Ambulance: East of England

Ansells End is a hamlet of four historic homes in Hertfordshire, England. The population of the hamlet at the 2011 Census was included in the civil parish of Kimpton.

Originally three farmsteads with the modern addition of a 16th-century barn converted into a property in the 21st century. One of the houses has parts dating to the early 1300s.

In 2023 the population is fewer than a dozen residents.
