= St. Anselm's Church (Lafayette, California) =

Episcopal church in Lafayette, California

Coordinates: 37.8748°N 122.0944°W

Religion
- Affiliation: Episcopal Church (United States)

Location
- Location: 682 Michael Lane, Lafayette, California, United States
- Interactive map of St. Anselm's Church

Architecture
- Architects: Marquis and Stoller; Olav Hammarstrom
- Completed: 1960

Website
- www.stanselms.us

St. Anselm's Church in Lafayette, California is an Episcopal church noted for its architecture.

In 1959, the Episcopal bishop of California, James Pike, hired Olav Hammarstrom to design St. Anselm's. Hammarstrom was a Finnish architect who worked with Alvar Aalto and later with Eero Saarinen and The Architects' Collaborative. Hammarstrom worked with the San Francisco architectural firm of Marquis and Stoller on St. Anselm's.

The concept for St. Anselm's was based on the Chapel of St. James the Fisherman in Wellfleet, Massachusetts, also designed by Hammarstrom. The church's interior features exposed redwood and cedar beams and columns. Using a "church-in-the-round" approach, the square sanctuary is in the center of the structure surrounded by redwood pews. The church seats approximately 450 parishioners in an octagonal space with everyone seated within seven rows from the altar. In December 1960, Time wrote that St. Anselm's design, in which the clergy and choir sit among the people, "appeals to Americans' democratic instincts."

Ground was broken on the church in May 1960, and it was dedicated in October 1960. After seeing the completed church, Bishop Pike noted, "At St. Anselm's, the congregation is not the audience for a performing clergy and choir. The clergy, choir and congregation perform together, and God is the audience."

A history published by St. Anselm's notes that the building's design was covered extensively in the news, before and after it was completed. Coverage included the December 1962 issue of Better Homes and Gardens and the December 26, 1960 issue of Time magazine, as well as San Francisco Bay Area newspapers, the cover of the September 1959 issue of "Pacific Churchman", the October 1960 issue of "This Earth" magazine.
