= St. Anselm's art =

St. Anselm's art is an archaic superstition, in which wounds are said to be cured by barely touching the linen wherein those wounds had been covered.

Martin Delrio, in his Disquisitiones Magicae, observed that some Italian soldiers who practiced this art attributed its invention to St. Anselm; but assured the reader that it was invented by Anselm de Parma, a celebrated astrologer and magician.
