= Ansell (given name) =

Ansell is a given name. Notable people with the name include:

- Ansell Clarke (1907–2002), Australian rules footballer
- Ansell Collins (born 1949), Jamaican musician, composer, singer, songwriter, and producer
- Ansell Wass (1832–1889), Union Army officer
- Ansell Delia (1998), Maltese citizen from Bormla
