= Ansell, Alberta =

Ansell
- Unincorporated Community
- Location of Ansell in Alberta
- Coordinates: 53.5572°N 116.5256°W
- Country: Canada
- Province: Alberta
- Region: Central Alberta
- Census division: No. 14
- Municipal district: Yellowhead County

Government
  - Type: unincorporated
  - Mayor: Jim Eglinski
  - Governing body: Yellowhead County Council: Shawn Brian Berry; Sandra Cherniawsky; Anthony Giezen; Dawn Mitchell; Fred Priestley-Wright; David Russell; William Velichko; Jack Williams
- Elevation: 930 m (3,050 ft)
- Time zone: UTC-7 (MST)

Ansell is an unincorporated community in central Alberta, Canada within Yellowhead County.

== Toponymy ==
Ansell is named for Henry Albert Ansell, one-time employee of the Grand Trunk Pacific Railway. He was secretary to Morley Donaldson, Grand Trunk's vice-president and general manager, at the time the siding was established.

== History ==
Ansell, established as a railway siding in 1911 by the Grand Trunk Pacific Railway, was founded to serve coal mining and transportation activities along the Alberta Coal Branch railway line. Several small, short-lived communities developed along this line to facilitate operations that took place in parts of the Rockies east of Jasper National Park.

As of the 21st century, Ansell is retained as a toponym for oil and gas operations in the area of the original siding, and for the small number of agricultural and residential properties in the vicinity.

== Services ==
The site contains a fire and bear lookout tower, Ansell Tower, operated by the provincial government. Services are provided through Edson.
