= Tomáš Hanzel =

Slovak footballer

Personal information
- Full name: Tomáš Hanzel
- Date of birth: 19 February 1989 (age 37)
- Place of birth: Zavar, Czechoslovakia
- Height: 1.86 m (6 ft 1 in)
- Position: Centre back

Team information
- Current team: Velky Meder

Youth career
- Spartak Trnava

Senior career*
Years	Team	Apps	(Gls)
2006–2010	Spartak Trnava	39	(0)
2011–2012	Petržalka	35	(2)
2012–2014	SFM Senec	30	(2)
2014	→ Sereď (loan)		
2014–2015	Sereď	24	(0)
2015–	Velky Meder		

International career^{‡}
2009	Slovakia U21		
- * Club domestic league appearances and goals as of 25 June 2015 ‡ National team caps and goals as of 3 April 2011

Tomáš Hanzel (born 19 February 1989) is a Slovak football defender who currently plays for Velky Meder.

In August 2009, he was on trial in FK Fotbal Třinec.
