= David A. Ansell =

American physician (born 1952)

- Born: 1952 (age 72–73)
- Occupations: Physician; health care manager

David A. Ansell (born 1952) is a Chicago-based physician, social epidemiologist and author. He is a supporter of single-payer health care and writes on the issue of health inequality in the United States. He spent seventeen years at Cook County Hospital (now the John H. Stroger Hospital of Cook County) and wrote a memoir entitled, County: Life, Death, and Politics in Chicago’s Public Hospital.

== Early years and education ==
David A. Ansell was born in 1952 and spent his formative years in Binghamton, New York. After high school, he attended Franklin and Marshall College (B.A., 1974) and medical school at the SUNY Upstate Medical University (M.D., 1978). He received his Masters of Public Health from the University of Illinois School of Public Health (1991). After finishing medical school in 1978, Ansell trained at Chicago’s Cook County Hospital.

== Career ==
Ansell served at Cook County Hospital as attending physician for 13 years, joining other physicians in a new Division of General Medicine/Primary Care. In the mid 1980s, Ansell and colleagues noted an increase in patient dumping, in which patients are transferred to public hospitals due to a lack of health insurance. In 1984, Ansell joined a project led by Robert Schiff to document patient dumping in Chicago. The same year, he founded and directed the Breast and Cervical Cancer Screening Program at Cook County Hospital, which he used to combat race-based disparity in health care. He contributed to an article critical of the practice, "Transfers to a Public Hospital", that appeared in the February 1986 edition of The New England Journal of Medicine.

Ansell left Cook County Hospital in 1955 to become Chairman of the Department of Internal Medicine of Mount Sinai Hospital, a private safety-net hospital in Chicago. Among other activities at Mount Sinai was the Sinai Urban Health Institute, a major health-disparity research and intervention center which he founded in 2002 with Steven Whitman. In 2006, he and Whitman published an article documenting the racial breast cancer mortality gap in Chicago. In response, they joined with others to found the Metropolitan Chicago Breast Cancer Taskforce to combat this disparity. In 2015, Ansell helped found the DePaul-Rush Center for Community Health Equity a Chicago-based health equity educational and research center based at DePaul University and Rush University Medical Center.

=== Leadership Positions ===
- Division Chief, Division of General Medicine/Primary Care, Cook County Hospital, Chicago, IL, 1993-1995
- Chairperson, Department of Internal Medicine, Mount Sinai Hospital, Chicago, IL, 1995-2005
- Chief Medical Officer at Rush University Medical Center, Chicago, IL, 2005–2015
- Senior Vice President for System Integration/Community Health at Rush University Medical Center. Chicago, IL, 2015 to present.

== Published books ==
Ansell first book was entitled, County: Life, Death, and Politics at Chicago’s Public Hospital. In the book, Ansell tells the story of his patients and colleagues during his seventeen years as a resident and attending physician at Chicago’s Cook County Hospital. County was released on July 1, 2011. The Wall Street Journal named it "one of the five best health books of 2011". It was hailed as a "landmark book" by Julia Keller of the Chicago Tribune, aiming "to inform and to inspire" readers about the disparities in health care. In the book, Ansell argues that only a single-payer solution that provides access to all US residents regardless of circumstances can provide relief for those closed out of the health care system.

His second book is entitled The Death Gap: How Inequality Kills, and was published by the University of Chicago Press in 2017

== Bibliography ==
- County: Life, Death and Politics at Chicago's Public Hospital ISBN 9780897336208
- The Death Gap: How Inequality Kills ISBN 9780226428154
