= Zavar =

- Municipality
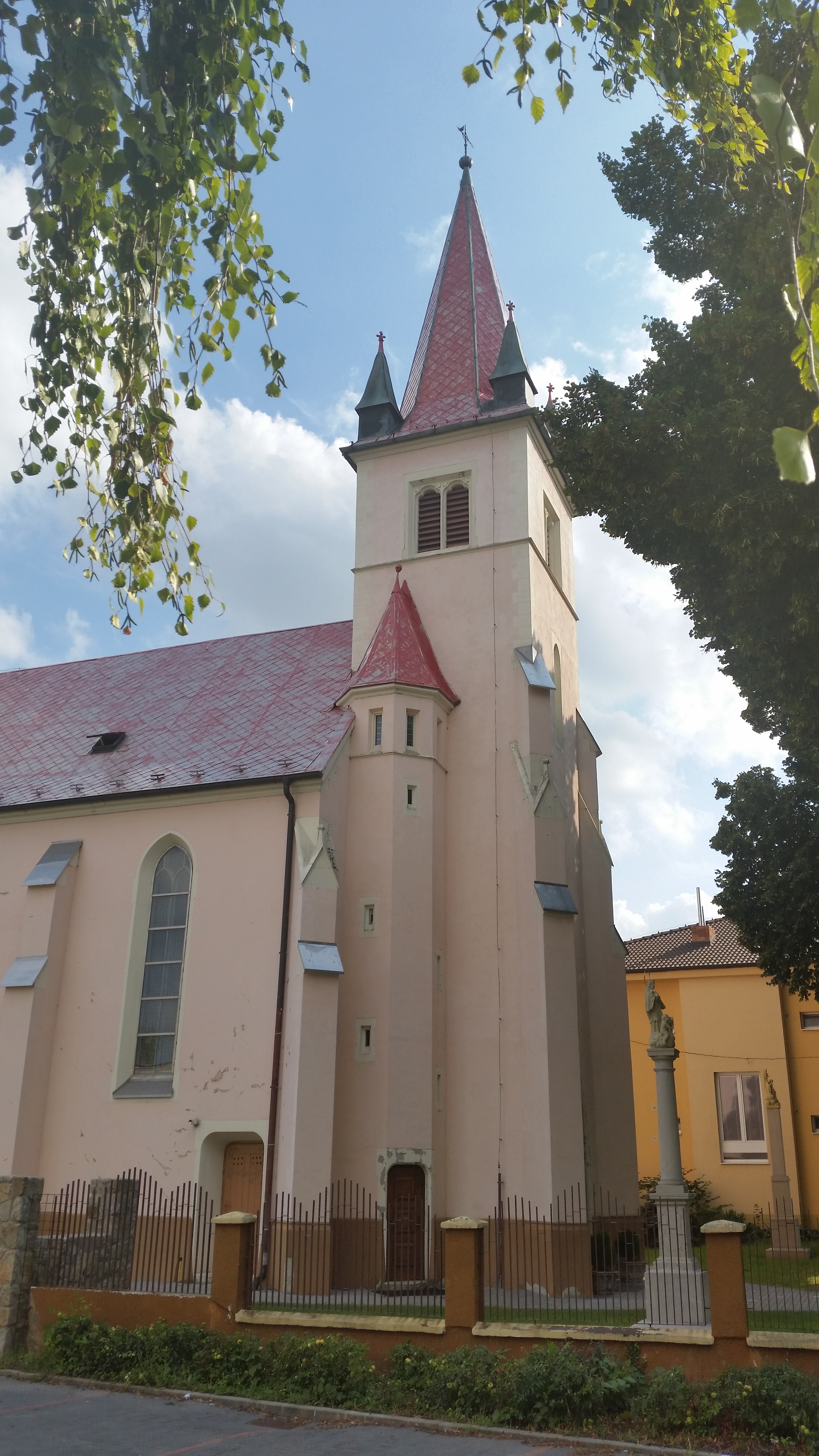

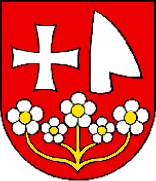
- Flag Coat of arms

- Location of Zavar in the Trnava Region Location of Zavar in Slovakia
- Coordinates: 48.35°N 17.68°E
- Country: Slovakia
- Region: Trnava Region
- District: Trnava District
- First mentioned: 1255

Area
  - Total: 13.95 km^{2} (5.39 sq mi)
- Elevation: 137 m (449 ft)

Population (2025)
  - Total: 2,622
- Time zone: UTC+1 (CET)
  - Summer (DST): UTC+2 (CEST)
- Postal code: 919 26
- Area code: +421 33
- Vehicle registration plate (until 2022): TT
- Website: www.zavar.sk

Zavar is a village and municipality of Trnava District in the Trnava region of Slovakia. According to the 2021 census, more than 15% of the inhabitants are foreigners, mostly Ukrainians and Serbians.

== Geography ==
The municipality lies at an altitude of 137 metres (449 ft) and covers an area of 13.95 km^{2} (5.39 sq mi) (2025).

== Population ==
Population statistic (10 years)
Year	1995	2005	2015	2025
Count	1662	1767	2220	2622
Difference		+6.31%	+25.63%	+18.10%

Population statistic
Year	2024	2025
Count	2563	2622
Difference		+2.30%

It has a population of 2622 people (31 December 2025).

=== Ethnicity ===
Census 2021 (1+ %)
Ethnicity	Number	Fraction
Slovak	1956	82.08%
Not found out	236	9.9%
Ukrainian	97	4.07%
Serbian	52	2.18%
Other	33	1.38%
Total	2383	

In year 2021 was 2383 people by ethnicity 1956 as Slovak, 236 as Not found out, 97 as Ukrainian, 52 as Serbian, 33 as Other, 16 as Vietnamese, 13 as Czech, 9 as Romanian, 6 as Rusyn, 6 as Hungarian, 5 as Russian, 4 as Romani, 3 as Albanian, 2 as French, 2 as Croatian, 1 as German, 1 as Moravian, 1 as Iranian and 1 as Greek.

Note on population: The difference values of population numbers in the table "Population statistic" and in the sections "Ethnicity" & "Religion" is caused by the use of various statistical methods.

=== Religion ===
Census 2021 (1+ %)
Religion	Number	Fraction
Roman Catholic Church	1442	60.51%
None	487	20.44%
Not found out	261	10.95%
Eastern Orthodox Church	83	3.48%
Evangelical Church	38	1.59%
Total	2383	

In year 2021 was 2383 people by religion 1442 from Roman Catholic Church, 487 from None, 261 from Not found out, 83 from Eastern Orthodox Church, 38 from Evangelical Church, 15 from Christian Congregations in Slovakia, 12 from Greek Catholic Church, 10 from Islam, 6 from Other, 6 from Ad hoc movements, 5 from Calvinist Church, 5 from Buddhism, 4 from Paganism and natural spirituality, 3 from Other and not ascertained christian church, 3 from Seventh-day Adventist Church, 1 from Jehovah's Witnesses, 1 from United Methodist Church and 1 from Church of Jesus Christ of Latter-day Saints.
