= Elise Ansel =

American painter

Elise Ansel is an American painter. She translates Old Master Paintings into a contemporary pictorial language. She draws upon familiar compositions from throughout the history of art. Ansel's paintings are derived and abstracted from Old Master paintings, modernising classical works. Ansel uses "an idiom of energetic gestural abstraction to mine art historical imagery for color and narrative structure, abstracting and interrupting representational content, in order to excavate and transform meanings and messages embedded in the works from which [her] paintings spring. [Her] work deconstructs pictorial language and authorial agency in order to address the myriad subtle ways the gender, identity and belief systems of the artist are embedded in the meaning of the work."

== Early life and education ==
Elise Ansel was born and raised in New York City. She received a BA in Comparative Literature from Brown University in 1984. While at Brown, she studied art at both Brown and the Rhode Island School of Design. She worked briefly in the film industry before deciding to make painting her first order medium. She earned her MFA in Visual Art from Southern Methodist University in 1993.

== Career ==
=== Painting ===
Since 1984, Ansel’s work has been featured in twenty-three solo exhibitions and over 50 group exhibitions in London and across the United States. Ansel has exhibited her work throughout the United States and in Europe. Her works are held in the permanent collections of the Museum of Contemporary Art in Krakow, the Bowdoin College Museum of Art and the Evansville Museum of Arts and Sciences. She is represented by Danese/Corey in New York City, Ellsworth Gallery in Santa Fe, and Cadogan Contemporary in London.

Most recently, Ansel has had solo shows in New York, Santa Fe, London, and in Detroit.

In 2020, Ansel created paintings for an exhibition at David Klein Gallery based on several Old Master works in the collection of the Detroit Institute of Arts.

=== Achievements ===
Ansel’s work appeared in the November 2013 Parrish Art Museum’s biennial exhibition, “Artists Choose Artists.”

Elise Ansel was nominated for the Young Masters Art Prize in 2013 and 2014. Ansel's work was recognized among 300 applicants. Her work was chosen for her appropriate use of and engagement with the history of art and classical painting in a modern context.

=== Teaching ===
Ansel has taught in a number of different positions in the United States and in France. Her titles in the U.S. include Professor of Foundation at the Savannah College of Art and Design, Adjunct Professor of Art at Armstrong Atlantic State University, Visiting Artist at the University of Maine, and visiting artist at Bowdoin College. Ansel also worked as a drawing instructor at the Pont Aven School of Contemporary Art in France. Ansel was an adjunct lecturer at Brown University from 2007 to 2014.

== Style ==
Ansel works with both oil painting and watercolor. Her works are abstract, while drawing on reality. Ansel’s work builds on the themes of “improvisation and transformation.”

Bill Van Siclen describes the distinctiveness of Ansel's work in her “use of Old Master painting as a stepping stone for her own visual improvisations.” Her work appropriates and engages with the history of art and puts classical painting in a modern context.

The focus of her paintings is both spiritual and secular. Her 2013 show, The Invisible Thread, emphasized colour over subject matter with clear religious undertones.

Ansel’s works draw upon secular masterpieces as well. Her 2013 show, “Drawn from History,” was inspired by “Master works from the collections in London.”

Elise Ansel has described her own work as “inspired by Renaissance and Baroque depictions of bacchanals and figure in the landscape... [she then] re-vision[s] Renaissance and Baroque paintings in order to explore their relevance to twenty-first century culture.”

== Press ==
- January 2011: Van Siclen, Bill. “‘Opposites attract’ at Providence show,” The Providence Journal
- January/February 2011: Weisgall, Deborah. “Elise Ansel,” Maine
- August 2013: Abatemarco, Michael. “A Renaissance renaissance: Elise Ansel reinterprets the masters,” Pasatiempo
- November 2013: Segal, Mark. “At the Parrish, ‘Artists Choose Artists.'” The East Hampton Street.
- October 2014: Cynthia Corbett Gallery interviewed Ansel about her Young Masters work. “Shortlisted Artist Elise Ansel on her Work“
- December 2014: Saatchi Art, “Inside the Studio: Elise Ansel (USA),” Saatchi Art Magazine
- September 2015: "Review of exhibition at The Ellsworth Gallery, Santa Fe, New Mexico (2015) ", American Art Collector magazine
- February 2016: Anderson, Anthony., "Elise Ansel: Distant Mirrors", Cafe Des Artists
- February 2016: Kany, Daniel., "Elise Ansel gloriously revisits Calvaert’s ‘Annunciation’ at Bowdoin", Portland Press Herald
- March 2016: Fall, Jacob and Rose, Virginia., "Elise Ansel’s Painterly Revelations", The Chart, Jacob Fall Reviews, Vol. 1, No. 6
- March/Feb 2016: Herriman, Kat., "Painter Elise Ansel storms the boys’ club, confronting Old Masters to create her wildly abstract paintings", Cultured Magazine
- April 2016: O'Hern, John., "Distant Mirrors Review", American Art Collector Magazine
- April 2016: Little, Carl., "Elise Ansel’s Ab-Ex Annunciation", HYPERALLERGIC
- March 2017: Adam, Mac Alfred., "Take It from the Masters: Elise Ansel Re-Reads and Reinterprets the Past at Danese/Corey", ARTnews
