= Anselm =

Anselm may refer to:

== People ==
=== Saints ===
- Anselm, Duke of Friuli (fl. 700s), Benedictine monk and abbot Nonantula
- Anselm of Canterbury (c. 1033–1109), philosopher, Abbot of Bec, and Archbishop of Canterbury
- Anselm of Lucca (1036–1086), better known as Saint Anselm of Lucca

=== Bishops ===
- Anselm I of Aosta (994–1026), the last bishop to serve as count of Aosta, and brother-in-law of Burchard, bishop of Aosta
- Anselm II (1070s x 1090s), bishop of Aosta
- Anselm (bishop of Bethlehem) (fl. 1129–1145)
- Anselm of Havelberg (c. 1100–1158), Premonstratensian canon and archbishop of Ravenna
- Anselm I of Lucca (died 1073), better known as Pope Alexander II
- Anselm of Meissen (13th century), bishop of Warmia
- Anselm I (bishop of Milan) (r. 813–818), bishop of Milan
- Anselm II (archbishop of Milan) (died 896), also known as Anselm II Capra
- Anselm III (archbishop of Milan) (Italian: Anselmo da Rho; r. 1086–1093)
- Anselm IV (archbishop of Milan) (Italian: Anselmo da Bovisio; r. 1097–1101)
- Anselm V (Archbishop of Milan) (r. 1126–1136), also known as Anselmo della Pusterla
- Anselmo Guido Pecorari (born 1946), Roman Catholic cardinal

=== Clerics ===
- Anselm of Besate, 11th-century churchman and rhetorician
- Anselm of Farfa (died 883), also known as Zelmo
- Anselm Grün (born 1945), German Benedictine monk and religious writer
- Anselm of Liège (1008–1056), chronicler of the Prince-Bishopric of Liège
- Anselm of Laon (died 1117), French biblical scholar, properly known as Ansel
- Anselm of Gembloux (died 1136), abbot of Gembloux Abbey in Namur, Belgium
- Anselm of St Saba and of Bury (died 1148), Benedictine monk elected bishop of London but refused consecration by Innocent II

=== Other people ===
- Anselm of Capraia, 13th-century Pisan count
- Anselm Feuerbach (1829–1880), German painter
- Anselm Kiefer (born 1945), German painter and sculptor
- Anslem de Silva (born 1940), Sri Lankan Sinhala biologist and herpetologist

== Other uses ==
- Anselm (film), a 2023 documentary film
- Saint Anselm College, a liberal arts college in the US
- List of ships named Anselm

== See also ==
- Ansel (disambiguation) and Ansell (disambiguation), the German form of the name
- Anselme
- Anselmo (disambiguation), the Italian form of the name
- Anselmus (disambiguation), the Latin form of the name
- Saint Anselm's (disambiguation), various places
