= Fortunato Anselmo =

Fortunato Anselmo (October 1, 1883 – July 15, 1965) was the Vice Consul of Italy of Salt Lake City from the 1920s to the beginning of World War II and again from 1950 to 1965. Well respected for his volunteer work in favor of the new Italian immigrants, Fortunato acted in an essentially diplomatic role for Utah Italians.

== Birth and early life ==
Born October 1, 1883, in Grimaldi, Province of Cosenza, Calabria, Italy, Fortunato Anselmo immigrated to the United States at the beginning of the 20th century. He first settled in Pueblo, Colorado, and worked as a reporter for the Italian-American newspaper Il Vindice, as well as in the mercantile industry. Fortunato married Anna Pagano in Pueblo in 1909. They had three children, Annette, Gilda, and Emma.

In 1911, the family moved to Salt Lake City where Fortunato operated a wholesale imported food business, F. Anselmo & Co. He opened another store in Carbon County, where a large number of Italian immigrants had settled. He founded La Gazzetta Italiana in 1912 in Salt Lake, quickly establishing himself as a spokesman within and for the Utah Italian community. He sold his newspaper interest upon being named vice consul.

== Vice Consulate ==
Fortunato's appointment as Vice Consul of Italy of Salt Lake City came on April 20, 1915, and he became the official adviser to Utah and Wyoming Italians. Through the vice consul's office, all requests for passports, visas, and other papers and documents that required official approval of the Italian government in Rome were transmitted. Additionally, he served as a representative of the Bank of Naples, one of Italy's oldest and largest financial institutions. In this role, he handled the sending of money orders by local Italians to relatives and friends in Italy as well as providing tickets for traveling immigrants.

The vice consul involved himself actively in the political and social arenas of Salt Lake City and Utah. In 1917, Anselmo lobbied the Utah State Legislature to have Columbus Day declared a legal state holiday. That effort failed; however, on March 13, 1919, Gov. Simon Bamberger signed into law a bill designating October 12, Columbus Day, a legal state holiday. On Monday, October 13, 1919, the largest Columbus Day celebration in Utah's history occurred. The Salt Lake Telegram labeled the parade as "one of the most pretentious pageants ever held in the city." It was reported that every group in the community enjoyed the celebration.

=== Friend to Utah Italians ===
Anselmo also involved himself deeply in the lives of the immigrants and their families. They looked to him for aid in solving many of the problems encountered in daily life. He helped in bringing relatives from Italy to Utah, translated Italian into English, and acted as an adviser when legal matters were in question. One of his saddest duties took him to Castle Gate, Carbon County, in March 1924 to offer his assistance following a coal mine explosion that killed 172 men, including 22 Italians.

=== Diplomatic duties ===
At the Anselmo home in Salt Lake City Fortunato and Anna greeted many dignitaries and celebrities. They entertained the Italian ambassador to the United States, Vittorio Rolandi-Ricci, in 1920; and in 1930 Italian heavyweight boxing champion Primo Carnera visited. Fortunato greeted a distinguished group of visitors in 1936, including Cardinal Eugenio Pacelli who would become Pope Pius XII.

=== Honors, resignation, reappointment, death ===
In recognition of his consular service, Anselmo received two honors from the Italian government—Knight of the Crown of Italy and Officer of the Order of the Crown of Italy. He completed the United States naturalization process, and became a United States citizen, in 1923 and as such was ordered by the Benito Mussolini government to resign his post as vice consul. He was to remain until a successor could be appointed; however, since no one was named, Anselmo remained until the office was ordered to close by the U.S. government in 1941 with the outbreak of war between the United States and Italy. However, in 1950, Fortunato received a reappointment and he remained as an Italian vice consul until his death on July 15, 1965.

== See also ==
- Utah Italians
