= Saint Anselm's =

Saint Anselm's may refer to:

== Places ==
- Challand-Saint-Anselme, Italy
- Saint-Anselme, Quebec, Canada
  - Saint-Anselme Aerodrome, Quebec
- Saint-Anselme, New Brunswick, Canada
- San Anselmo, California, United States

== Education ==
- The Pontifical Atheneum of St. Anselm (Pontificio Ateneo Sant Anselmo) in Rome
- Saint Anselm College, a liberal arts college in Goffstown, New Hampshire, United States
- St. Anselm's College, a grammar school in Merseyside, England
- St. Anselm's Abbey School, a Catholic preparatory school in Washington, D.C., United States
- St. Anselm Catholic School, an elementary school in Toronto, Canada
- St. Anselm's Catholic School, a Catholic secondary school in Kent, England
- St. Anselm Hall, the University of Manchester, UK
- St. Anselm's Pink City Sr. Sec. School, Jaipur, a Catholic school with church in Rajasthan, India
- St Anselm's School, Bakewell, a private school in Derbyshire, England

== Religion ==
- Saint Anselm Abbey (New Hampshire), in Goffstown, New Hampshire, United States
- Saint Anselm's Abbey (Washington, D.C.), United States
- St. Anselm's art, an archaic superstition
- St Anselm's ontological argument, an ontological argument for the existence of God attempting an a priori proof using intuition and reason alone

== See also ==
- Anselm (disambiguation)
- St. Anselm's Church (disambiguation)
- Church of Sant'Anselmo all'Aventino, Rome
