= Just Folks... A Firesign Chat =

Just Folks . . . A Firesign Chat

Studio album by The Firesign Theatre
- Released: January 1977
- Recorded: December 1976
- Genre: Comedy
- Length: 39:49
- Label: Butterfly Records
- Producer: Philip Austin, Peter Bergman, David Ossman, and Philip Proctor

The Firesign Theatre chronology
Forward Into The Past (1976)	Just Folks . . . A Firesign Chat (1977)	Nick Danger: The Case of the Missing Shoe (1979)

Professional ratings
Review scores
Source	Rating
Christgau's Record Guide	B−
The Goldmine Comedy Record Price Guide	1.5/4 stars
The New Rolling Stone Record Guide	2/5 stars

Just Folks... A Firesign Chat is a 1977 comedy album by the Firesign Theatre. The material is based on previously unreleased material from their 1970–1972 radio shows Dear Friends and Let's Eat!. It was the only record the group made under a new contract with Butterfly Records, after the cancellation of their ten-year Columbia Records contract.

== Background ==
The Firesign Theatre (Peter Bergman, Philip Proctor, Phil Austin, and David Ossman) lost their prestigious recording contract with Columbia Records, under which they had produced fourteen albums (including one on the subsidiary Epic Records label), after their thirteenth album In the Next World, You're on Your Own sold poorly in 1975. As Bergman describes it, "We didn't fight. The group had really split apart; we had just burned out. I mean it was five years non-stop work. We would stop one album and start writing the next. Frankly, we didn't have five more albums in us at that point." Their last Columbia record was the 1976 "greatest hits" compilation Forward Into the Past, consisting of selections from their previous records.

For their next album, they decided to take material from their 1970 Dear Friends and 1971–72 Let's Eat radio shows which aired on station KPFK FM in Los Angeles, and work it into some newly recorded material, overdubbing some of the existing material for continuity. The radio material had never been officially released on record as of 1976. The sketches are placed within the context of a TV news program airing in the fictional town of "Ducktown." There is an ad included for "Confidence in the System" and also a trip to "Jimmy Carterland".

The Firesigns contracted with A.J. Cervantes to produce this album on the newly formed disco label, Butterfly Records.

== Packaging ==
The album cover is a parody of René Magritte's surrealist painting The Mysteries of the Horizon (Le Chef D’Oeuvre). The original painting shows three images of what seems to be the same man in a black suit and bowler hat, each facing in a different direction, but each with the waxing crescent Moon directly above his head. The parody depicts the four members of the Firesign Theatre similarly dressed in suits and hats like the original, but each wears a different tie. Phil Austin's hat is on fire; Philip Proctor is the only one with the crescent Moon above his head, and he is smoking a pipe. David Ossman's hat appears to be floating above his head. Peter Bergman smiles at the viewer; there is nothing unusual about his hat.

The inner sleeve of the original vinyl LP contained an ad for an official Firesign Theatre belt buckle and T-shirt, reading "Yes, dear bozos, you two [sic] can have a remarkable T-shirt and/or cast iron belt buckle for a mere pittance". ^{[3a]}

== Track listing ==
=== Side one ===
1. "Hello, What's Happening? I Die Every Night..." (7:22)
2. A Stiff Idiot Is The Worst Kind! (5:19)
3. The Truck Stops Here (3:56)
4. Ben Bland's All-Day Matinee, Part One (3:55)

=== Side two ===
1. Ben Bland's All-Night Matinee, Part Two (Tudor Nightmare Village and Confidence in the System) (6:20)
2. Any More Rocket Fuel For You Hardhats? (7:39)
3. Pass the Indian, Please (5:08)

== Description of the album ==
The "Ben Bland" segments are among the few items of new material written for the album. These segments parody the old hosted afternoon ("Dialing for Dollars") movies. Host "Blend---Ben Bland" comes off as utterly high, stoned, or perhaps senile, desperately trying to act straight, and unable to resist free association. He earnestly corrects errors in his public service announcements with even more errors: "Just send ... to ... Barn C, Crabapple, Maryland; that's Born Free ... Marineland ..." And in an eerily prescient ad, Ben Bland informs aliens that "marrying an animal can mean citizenship for you; just listen to these success stories from your U.S. Animal Husbandry Service." In David Ossman's memoir Fighting Clowns of Hollywood, he writes the following concerning the Ben Bland segments:

I loved playing Ben Bland. He was based on a real LA movie host, on films broken every couple of minutes for horrible commercials, on the ubiquity of old movies all-day-every-day on the local TV channels. Basically the same world that Ralph Spoilsport came from. Ben appeared first in a record album I was trying to save — “Just Folks” — which had been half built of old radio routines and needed some new, live material. Ben came along with a commercial about The 10 Danger Signals of Depression, which were, of course, the real thing.

The album ends with the track "Pass the Indian, Please," a skit from several years earlier. Like the track "Temporarily Humbolt County" (sic) from Waiting for the Electrician or Someone Like Him, it is concerned with the European expansion into North America and the displacement of the Native Americans. In 2002 The Firesign Theatre re-recorded the final track on this album, "Pass the Indian, Please," for NPR's news program, All Things Considered. The NPR re-recording is included, with a few revisions, on their 2003 album All Things Firesign.

== Release history ==
- LP Butterfly Records FLY001 1977
- CD Firesign Theatre Records / Lodestone Catalog MSUG120 2005

The original broadcasts were released in 2010 on the group's Duke of Madness Motors DVD compilation. Another album distilled from the Duke of Madness Motors set, Dope Humor of the Seventies, which also collected material from the Just Friends and Let's Eat! radio shows, was released in 2020.

== Citations ==
1. Marsh, Dave, and Greil Marcus. "The Firesign Theatre." The New Rolling Stone Record Guide. Ed. Dave Marsh and John Swenson. New York: Random House, 1983. 175-176.
2. Smith, Ronald L. The Goldmine Comedy Record Price Guide. Iola: Krause, 1996. 124-127.
3. ^{a} Firesign Theatre. Just Folks . . . A Firesign Chat. Butterfly Records, 1977.
4. Lopez, Bernard F. "A. J. Cervantes of Butterfly Records (Interview)." Discomusic.com. 15 May 2003. Discomusic.com. 16 February 2006 <https://web.archive.org/web/20061027221159/http://www.discomusic.com/people-more/56_0_11_0_C/>.
5. Ossman, David. Fighting Clowns of Hollywood: With Laffs by the Firesign Theater. BearManor Media, 2018. Chapter 3.
