= Everything You Know Is Wrong =

Studio album by The Firesign Theatre
- Released: October 1974
- Genre: Comedy
- Length: 42:00
- Label: Columbia
- Producer: The Firesign Theatre

The Firesign Theatre chronology
The Tale of the Giant Rat of Sumatra (1974)	Everything You Know Is Wrong (1974)	In the Next World, You're on Your Own (1975)

Professional ratings
Review scores
Source	Rating
The New Rolling Stone Record Guide	5/5 stars
Christgau's Record Guide	A−

Everything You Know Is Wrong is the eighth comedy album by the Firesign Theatre. Released in October 1974 on Columbia Records, it satirizes UFO conspiracy theories and New Age paranormal beliefs such as Erich von Däniken's Chariots of the Gods and claimed psychic Uri Geller, which achieved wide public attention by that time.

== Characters ==
The four main characters are pictured on the album cover:

- "Happy" Harry Cox (Phil Austin) — narrator of the album; purveyor of New Age fringe theories. Cox calls his followers "Seekers" and runs a recording studio he calls "Nude Age Enterprises" from his mobile home in a nudist trailer park located in the fictional town of Hellmouth, California (surrounded by the towns of Hooker and Heater). Although Cox is depicted on the cover and in the accompanying video as clothed, he apparently is a nudist, as Gary asks "Why are you naked?" when meeting him face-to-face.
- Gary (Peter Bergman) — a teen-age "Seeker", member of a group who travel on the "Heavenly Bus".
- Art Wholeflaffer (David Ossman) — nudist manager of the trailer park where Cox lives. Wholeflaffer is actually a nudist, as he is depicted as wearing only a visor cap and tool apron.
- Nino Savatte (Philip Proctor) — the "Great Mind-Boggler" who communicates with his audience "by sending directly from his mind to yours"; a satire of "psychic" spoon-bender Uri Geller.

== Plot ==
The LP is ostensibly the latest in Cox's series of "mind-breaking records" purveying his New Age revelations, augmented with mock commercial television news coverage. There are no track divisions.

=== Side 1 (20:45) ===
Cox starts the record with a tinny-sounding recording of Richard Strauss' Also Sprach Zarathustra. After a brief introduction plugging his records, he gives a reverberating montage of his latest revelations, such as "Dogs flew spaceships", "Men and women are the same sex", and "Your brain is not the boss"; concluding with "Everything you know is wrong!"

Cox interviews Heater County, California Sheriff Luger Axehandle (Ossman), who claims to have seen a dog- or wolf-like alien digging up a grave in Curio, Arizona. Cox follows this with an interview of Lem Ashhauler (Proctor), editor of the Hellmouth-Heater Democrat newspaper, who reads an archived 1897 story identifying the grave's occupant as a strange visitor who choked to death on a piece of cheese.

Next, Cox plays an educational film, Ben Franklin: Hero or Hophead?, which alleges that the United States Founding Fathers Benjamin Franklin (Bergman), Samuel Adams (Proctor), and Thomas Jefferson (Austin) planned the American Revolution while smoking hemp.

Cox follows this with a purported wire recording of an old-time medicine show produced by "Doctor Firesign's Antique Theatre". The show starts with Act One of the play Orphan's Tears (parodying Uncle Tom's Cabin), in which Field Marshal Thomas Legree Quadroon (Bergman), a freed "professional slave", returns from the Civil War as a carpetbagger to terrorize his former owners by demanding they pay a "carpet tax" and telling them it's their turn to be the slaves. At intermission, the charlatan Professor Archer (Ossman) and his assistant Bowman (Bergman) prepare a potion from cactus juice, "Chief Dancing Knockout's Pyramid Pushover Paste", and "Don Brouhaha's Inca Hell-Oil Tonic". Cox then segues into his narration of a dramatization of Archer and Bowman ingesting their potion, turning into crows, and flying away to encounter Don Brouhaha (Proctor), an "ancient cockroach in a sombrero", actually a Native American shaman, a lampoon of Carlos Castaneda's character Don Juan Matus.

Cox's recording session is then interrupted by a phone call from psychic Nino Savant (Proctor), who tells him the aliens want to contact Cox. Savant moves from the phone to the TV, so Cox can listen to his answering machine. The only messages are from his bank, the trailer park manager Art Wholeflaffer (Ossman), and a teenage stalker fan named Gary (Bergman).

After Savant leaves the TV, it stays on and we hear the Channel 6 television news report, anchored by the "Where It's At" team of Harold Hiphugger (Ossman) and Ray Hamberger (Proctor) (pronounced "am-bur-ZHER", but Cox later addresses him as "Mr. Hamburger"). They lampoon the "happy talk" television news format which came into fashion about this time. Cox leaves his trailer to talk to Wholeflaffer, but leaves the TV on.

After a commercial for "Bear Wiz" beer, a quick weather report, and another commercial for "Magog Brothers Atlantis Carpet Reclaimers", who are stuck with a warehouse full of inventory damaged by the recent collision of a comet (inspired by the less-than-spectacular 1973 appearance of comet Kohoutek), cynical reporter Pat Hat (Bergman, a lampoon of Howard Cosell) interviews "daredemon" Reebus Caneebus (Austin), who plans to jump into the deep hole left in the desert by the comet (a lampoon of Evel Knievel's jump of Snake River Canyon).

Side 1 ends with Cox's voice-over teasing his "most startling new revelation" on side 2.

=== Side 2 (21:15) ===
This starts with aliens apparently revealing themselves and demanding the surrender of Earth, until Cox angrily stops the record, declaring he, too, "was taken in by clever fakes like this." As proof that aliens have landed on Earth, he plays an episode of the travel show The Golden Hind, a parody of the 1950s-60s TV series The Golden Voyage, hosted by Bob Hind (Austin, parody of travelogue film producer Jack Douglas). Hind interviews Buzz and Bunny Crumbhunger (Bergman and Proctor), a married couple who present a home movie of their abduction, murder and resurrection by aliens.

Cox then presents an "official stolen government training film" of "the secret plan to deal with an alien uprising", narrated by Air Force General Curtis Goatheart (Proctor, a lampoon of Curtis LeMay). The film contains an enactment of a general (Ossman) telling his wife (Austin) and two of his officers (Proctor and Bergman) at breakfast that "two flying saucers [eggs] have just landed on my plate." Though they think he is insane, he takes command and "bombs aliens back to stone age".

The Crumbhungers happen to live in the trailer space next to Cox, and Wholeflaffer has shared his suspicions of them. Cox enlists him to spy on a party they are hosting, but this plan goes awry when the Crumbhungers and their alien friends give Wholeflaffer a drink containing blue moss with hallucinogenic effects, and abduct him by driving their motor home away, headed for the comet hole in Curio. Just then, Gary and his friends drop in on Cox, who tells them to hitch their "Heavenly Bus" up to his trailer and follow the Crumbhungers. Just before leaving, Cox introduces Nino Savant's "Psychic Minute", a lecture on the subject of holes broadcast by "sending directly from his mind to yours." Nino mentions the comet hole in the desert, saying it leads to "the Sun at the center of the Earth".

This segues into Channel 6's continuing coverage of Caneebus's jump and its aftermath, anchored by Hiphugger and Hamberger. A videotape of the morning's jump shows Caneebus finding the hole is only 60 feet deep and contains a golden staircase leading to the Sun. When he decides not to return, Pat Hat jumps in after him. Live coverage then resumes, as the estimated 500,000 to one million spectators have formed a literal parade following Caneebus into the hole, culminating with "the former President's float" (Austin's imitation of Richard Nixon, who resigned two months before the album's release.) Finally, no one but the newsmen and Cox are left, and they ask Cox to keep the camera pointed at them as they enter the hole. Cox asks them to tell Wholeflaffer to come back if they see him, but they are oblivious to this request.

At last the aliens appear, happening to sound just like the "clever fake" on Cox's earlier record, and flying a spaceship that Cox describes as looking "like a big fried egg." Finding no one but Cox, the aliens decide to leave for another millennium. Cox is left alone to muse: "Seekers...it looks like this is the end. Or is it only the begin–?" A coyote howls in the distance, and Cox concludes, "No, it's the end."

== Video ==
After the album was recorded, a movie version was made, with the group lip-syncing to the album. The Don Brouhaha scene from side one, Cox's side two teaser, and Nino Savant's lecture on "Holes" from side two, are not included in the video. The cinematographer was Allen Daviau, who later filmed E.T. the Extra-Terrestrial. (UPC barcode 735885 100131.) The group showed the film at Stanford University and took questions and answers.

The film was released on a VHS format videotape in 1993 by The Firesign Theatre. (UPC barcode 735885 100131.) It was released on DVD in 2016. (UPC barcode 824818 000386.)

== References to earlier Firesign Theatre albums ==
Dr. Cox's line about those "who might still believe that pigs live in trees" references the Firesigns' 1969 single B-side "Forward Into The Past" (later included on the double-LP compilation of the same name, as well as the double-CD compilation Shoes for Industry: The Best of the Firesign Theatre).

The "Ben Franklin: Hero or Hophead?" segment includes two direct quotes from the sketch "$100 Ben" from the Dear Friends radio show, which appears on the Dear Friends album.

The line "But did you know that Indians can be in two places at once?" references the title of their second album How Can You Be in Two Places at Once When You're Not Anywhere at All.

Don Brouhaha laughs ("ha ha ha") after saying his name. This refers to a gag from the Nick Danger radio play on How Can You Be in Two Places at Once When You're Not Anywhere at All where Danger is asked, "What's all this brouhaha?" and he responds by laughing.

Rebus Caneebus' phrase "this stinkin' desert" had previously been used in "Temporarily Humboldt County", the opening track on their debut album Waiting for the Electrician or Someone Like Him.

The Funny Names Club Of America, referenced twice on this album, came from a bit that Phil Austin did on the Firesigns' 1971-72 radio program Let's Eat. (This sketch was not commercially released until the Duke of Madness Motors book/DVD archival set in 2010, and later on the shorter 2020 compilation Dope Humor of the Seventies.)

Pat Hat's comment "As Syd Fudd the great scientist-sportsman once said to me, 'What goes down must come out'" references the I Think We're All Bozos on This Bus character Sir Sydney Fudd, as well as Teslacle's Deviant to Fudd's Law: "It comes in, it must go out" (also from Bozos).

The TV show The Golden Hind, hosted by Bob Hind, first appears on Don't Crush That Dwarf, Hand Me the Pliers.

In the video, Gary the Seeker wears a T-shirt bearing the pseudo-Latin phrase Quid malmborg in plano which appeared in I Think We're All Bozos on This Bus. This comes from a phrase "Malmborg in Plano" inscribed on a lighter Philip Proctor acquired, according to a Rolling Stone interview. David Ossman is wearing the same T-shirt on the cover of the Dear Friends album.

== Release history ==
This album was originally released simultaneously on LP, 8 Track, Quadrophonic LP, and quadrophonic 8 track cartridge.

- LP - KC-33141
- 8 Track - CA-33141
- Quadrophonic LP - CQ-33141
- Quadrophonic 8 track cartridge -

It has been re-released on CD at least once

- 2001 - Laugh.com LGH1077

== In popular culture ==
- On their 1992-1993 Zoo TV Tour, Irish rock band U2 used "Everything You Know is Wrong" as the opening phrase of a barrage of text-based visuals conceived by director Mark Pellington, to accompany their song The Fly during the concerts. The phrase was reprised many times when the song was played on subsequent tours, including during their 2023-2024 Las Vegas residency, U2:UV Achtung Baby Live at Sphere.
- Musical parodist Weird Al Yankovic used the title "Everything You Know Is Wrong" for an original song on his 1996 album Bad Hair Day.
- Paranormal researcher Lloyd Pye used the title in his 1997 book Everything You Know is Wrong – Book One: Human Evolution.
- Conspiracy theorist Russ Kick used it in a 2002 book he edited, Everything You Know Is Wrong: The Disinformation Guide to Secrets and Lies.
- The British alternative band Chumbawamba used the title for a song about conspiracy theories on their 2004 album Un.
