= Proctor and Bergman =

American comedy duo

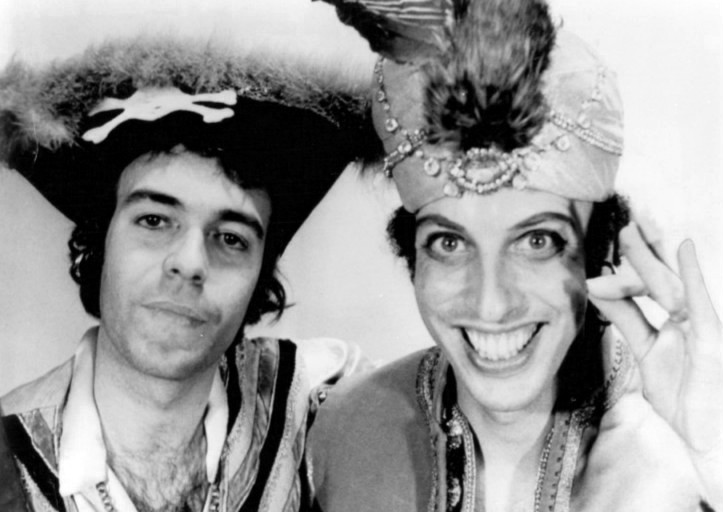
- Education: Yale University
- Notable work: Fred Flamm; Clark Cable; Bosco Hearn; Ms. Information; Nasi Goring; Reverend Sport Trendleberg; TV or Not TV (1973); J-Men Forever (1979)

Comedy career
- Years active: 1973–2012
- Medium: Radio; audio recordings; stage; film
- Genres: Surreal humor; sketch comedy; word play
- Subjects: Zeitgeist; Television
- Members: Peter Bergman (deceased); Philip Proctor

Proctor and Bergman was a comedy duo consisting of Philip Proctor and Peter Bergman. The two started performing in 1973 while taking a break from the four-man comedy act The Firesign Theatre, with the comedy album "TV or Not TV", on which they based a short film in 1978. They reunited the Firesign Theatre in 1974, but resumed their duo act in 1975 during a second temporary split of the Firesigns, and continued to perform as a duo during several breaks of the Firesign Theatre until Bergman's death in 2012.

== History ==
Peter Bergman and Philip Proctor met while attending Yale University in the late 1950s, where Proctor studied acting, and Bergman edited the Yale comedy magazine. Bergman studied playwriting and collaborated as lyricist with Austin Pendleton on two Yale Dramat musicals in which Proctor starred: Tom Jones, and Booth Is Back In Town.

Proctor was in Los Angeles in 1966, looking for acting work and watching the Sunset Strip curfew riots. When he discovered he was sitting on a newspaper photo of Bergman, he called his college buddy, who recruited him as the fourth man for the comedy group he formed, along with producers Phil Austin and David Ossman. Bergman christened the group the Firesign Theatre, as all four were born under the three astrological fire signs (Aries, Leo, and Sagittarius).

In 1972, the Firesign Theatre combined parts of a live stage show, the Shakespeare parody The Count of Monte Cristo, with a live KPFK broadcast, Martian Space Party, plus some new studio material to produce their sixth album Not Insane or Anything You Want To. But before releasing the album in October 1972, they had discarded their original story line idea and some newly written scenes. The album performed poorly, and the Firesigns decided to take a break and perform in separate directions for a while. Proctor and Bergman decided to perform as a duo, and made a separate record deal with Columbia, producing TV or Not TV: A Video Vaudeville in Two Acts. They turned this into a vaudeville-type show which they played on tour. While promoting the show, they did a radio interview with disk jockey Wolfman Jack.

The Firesign Theatre reunited in 1974 and produced three more comedy albums for Columbia. The ninth one, In the Next World, You're on Your Own, was a black comedy which also sold poorly in 1975, and caused the Firesigns to lose their Columbia recording contract. They effectively split in half again, and Proctor and Bergman turned their attention to producing a live show and Columbia album, What This Country Needs, based in part on material from TV or Not TV.

They appeared as regulars on a 1977 summer replacement TV series hosted by the Starland Vocal Band. Proctor and Bergman gave up their road performances after witnessing the September 4, 1977 Golden Dragon Massacre, and in 1978 released another studio album Give Us a Break, which lampooned radio and television. The Starland Vocal Band also performed short comic radio breaks on this album.

In 1979, Proctor and Bergman produced a film, J-Men Forever, using clips from old Republic Pictures movie serials with dubbed dialogue, combined with new footage of them as FBI agents tracking down a villain known as "the Lightning Bug" voiced by disk jockey M. G. Kelly. This became popular on the 1980s late-night TV series Night Flight.

The Firesign Theatre reunited again late in 1979, but the changing American social and political climate marked by the election of President Ronald Reagan caused a cooling-off of the Theatre's first wave of popularity. In the summer of 1990, NPR producer Ted Bonnitt called Proctor and asked him if he wanted to contribute some comedy material to Bonnitt's nightly program HEAT with John Hockenberry. Proctor called Bergman, and the duo agreed to write and perform a serial consisting of 13 five-minute episodes, Power: Life on the Edge in L.A.

In 1993, the Firesign Theatre reunited for a ten-city cross-country reunion tour, and experienced a second wave of popularity. They produced five albums of new material and continued to perform live, until Bergman's death on March 9, 2012, from complications involving leukemia.

== Media ==
=== Albums ===
- TV or Not TV (1973 Columbia)
- What This Country Needs (1975, Columbia) Live, based on material from TV or Not TV
- Give Us a Break (1978, Mercury Records)

=== Radio ===
- The Proctor-Bergman Report (1977–1978)
- Power: Life on the Edge in L.A. (summer 1990) On NPR's Heat with John Hockenberry

=== Films ===
- Six Dreams (Peter Bergman - executive producer, Phil Proctor) (13 min., 1976)
- TV or Not TV (33 min., 1978) based on the Proctor and Bergman album
- Americathon (86 min., 1979) based on a sketch created by Proctor and Bergman
- J-Men Forever (75 min., 1979) Proctor and Bergman; compilation of Republic Science Fiction serial clips with new dialogue overdubbed

=== Games ===
- In 1983 Mattel released two Intellivision video games with Intellivoice: Bomb Squad, with Proctor as the voice of Frank and Bergman as the voice of Boris
