= What This Country Needs (Proctor and Bergman album) =

Live album by Proctor and Bergman
- Released: September 1975
- Recorded: 1975
- Venue: The Bottom Line, New York City
- Studio: The Record Plant, NYC
- Genre: Comedy
- Label: Columbia
- Producer: Steve Gillmor

Proctor and Bergman chronology
TV or Not TV (1973)	What This Country Needs (1975)	Give Us a Break (1978)

What This Country Needs is the second comedy album by the duo Proctor and Bergman of the Firesign Theatre. It was originally released in September 1975 on Columbia Records, and was among the Firesign Theatre's last Columbia albums, along with In the Next World, You're on Your Own and Forward Into The Past. It was recorded from a live performance at The Bottom Line which contained material adapted or re-used from their 1973 studio album TV or Not TV, plus several new sketches.

== Title and cover art ==
The title is taken from a song Philip Proctor and Peter Bergman wrote, which parodies Vice President Thomas R. Marshall's famous quote, "What this country needs is a good five-cent cigar". The song says what this country needs is "a good five-cent joke". The album's cover art mimics a cardboard cigar box lid, with a painting of Proctor dressed as a field worker in jean overalls and a straw hat, with Bergman dressed in a suit as the plantation owner. Proctor holds up a wad of cash, while Bergman holds a handful of cigars. The picture provides another joke, as the crop appears to be marijuana (some of which sticks out of Proctor's hip pocket) rather than tobacco.

== Track listing ==
=== Side one — act one ===
1. "Turning on Bosco Hern"*
2. "Fred and Ford" – a new skit with Fred Flamm (Proctor) interviewing President Gerald Ford (Bergman) during the "Walking and Chewing Gum At the Same Time Marathon"
3. "Red Pills on Drugs"*
4. "The Roaming Umpire"*
5. "Give Up This Day (with R. Reverend "Sport" Trendleberg)"*

=== Side two — act two ===
1. "What This Country Needs" – a new song performed by Proctor and Bergman
2. "Callback" – new; several listeners (Proctor) call a radio talk show host (Bergman)
3. "The Man Who Eats Watches" – a new skit featuring German Wacko Krank (Bergman) and a waiter (Proctor), mostly in the Firesign Theatre's usual surrealist vein
4. "Dr. Astro" – new; Proctor gives whacky horoscopes
5. "Hundred-Dollar Shine" – new; shoe-shine boy (Bergman) charges a business man (Proctor) an outrageous price

* Skits adapted from TV or Not TV

== Issues and reissues ==
This album was originally released on LP:

- LP — PC-33687

It has been re-released on CD at least once:

- 2001 - Laugh.com LGH1164.2
