= Forward Into the Past =

Greatest hits album by The Firesign Theatre
- Released: 1976
- Genre: Comedy
- Length: 105:57
- Label: Columbia
- Producer: See individual track listings

The Firesign Theatre chronology
In the Next World, You're on Your Own (1975)	Forward Into the Past (1976)	Just Folks . . . A Firesign Chat (1977)

Forward Into the Past is a 1976 compilation album by the Firesign Theatre. It presents the "Greatest Hits" from their nine Columbia albums and includes two tracks that were previously released only on a single.

Professional ratings
Review scores
Source	Rating
The New Rolling Stone Record Guide	5/5 stars
The Goldmine Comedy Record Price Guide	2/4 stars

== Track listing ==
=== Side one ===
1. "Station Break"
  - Released as a single - November 1969
  - Produced by James William Guercio
2. "Happy Hour News"
  - From the album Everything You Know Is Wrong - October 1974
  - Produced by The Firesign Theatre
3. "Ralph Spoilsport Motors"
  - From the album How Can You Be in Two Places at Once When You're Not Anywhere at All - July 1969
  - Produced by Cyrus Faryar
4. "Beat The Reaper"
  - From the album Waiting for the Electrician or Someone Like Him - January 1968
  - Produced by Gary Usher and The Firesign Theatre
5. "Let's Eat"
  - From the album Don't Crush That Dwarf, Hand Me the Pliers - July 1970
  - Produced by The Firesign Theatre with Bill Driml
6. "High School Madness"
  - From the album Don't Crush That Dwarf, Hand Me the Pliers - July 1970
  - Produced by The Firesign Theatre with Bill Driml

=== Side two ===
1. "Toad Away"
  - From the album Dear Friends - January 1972
  - Produced by The Firesign Theatre
2. "Not Quite The Solution He Expected"
  - From the album The Tale of the Giant Rat of Sumatra - January 1974
  - Produced by The Firesign Theatre
3. "Joe Beets Meets Hemlock Stones"
  - From the album The Tale of the Giant Rat of Sumatra - January 1974
  - Produced by The Firesign Theatre
4. "W.C. Fields Forever"
  - From the album Waiting for the Electrician or Someone Like Him - January 1968
  - Produced by Gary Usher and The Firesign Theatre
5. "Dr. Whiplash"
  - From the album Dear Friends - January 1972
  - Produced by The Firesign Theatre

=== Side three ===
1. "The Further Adventures of Nick Danger"
  - From the album How Can You Be in Two Places at Once When You're Not Anywhere at All - July 1969
  - Produced by Cyrus Faryar

=== Side four ===
1. "Back From The Shadows"
  - From the album I Think We're All Bozos on This Bus - August 1971
  - Produced by The Firesign Theatre
2. "Mr. President"
  - From the album I Think We're All Bozos on This Bus - August 1971
  - Produced by The Firesign Theatre
3. "Papoon For President"
  - From the album Not Insane or Anything You Want To - October 1972
  - Produced by The Firesign Theatre
4. "Government Training Film"
  - From the album Everything You Know Is Wrong - October 1974
  - Produced by The Firesign Theatre
5. "Mark Time"
  - From the album Dear Friends - January 1972
  - Produced by The Firesign Theatre
6. "Forward Into The Past"
  - Released as a single - November 1969
  - Produced by James William Guercio

== Critical reception ==
Most fan sites agree that this album is a good place to start for someone who has never heard of The Firesign Theatre. The New Rolling Stone Record Guide claims that this album was "brilliantly selected and programmed" (175) while The Goldmine Comedy Record Price Guide offers no comment beyond its 2 star marking.

== Release history ==
Forward Into The Past was released only as a double album.

Columbia PG-34391

This album was never released on CD. Instead, in 1993 a new collection was put together under the title Shoes for Industry: The Best of the Firesign Theatre and was released by Sony/Legacy. Shoes contains most of the same tracks as Forward Into The Past but also takes advantage of the greater running time available on a Compact Disc in order to add more tracks. Shoes also includes tracks which members of the group had released on their various "solo" projects.

== External sources ==
- Firesign Theatre. Forward Into The Past. Columbia Records, 1976.
- Firesign Theatre. Firesign Theatre. February 9, 2006 http://www.firesigntheatre.com/.
- "Firezine: Linques!." Firesign Theatre FAQ. February 10, 2006 http://firezine.net/faq/.
- Marsh, Dave, and Greil Marcus. "The Firesign Theatre." The New Rolling Stone Record Guide. Ed. Dave Marsh and John Swenson. New York: Random House, 1983. 175-176.
- Smith, Ronald L. The Goldmine Comedy Record Price Guide. Iola: Krause, 1996. 124-127.

== Citations ==
- Marsh, Dave, and Greil Marcus. "The Firesign Theatre." The New Rolling Stone Record Guide. Ed. Dave Marsh and John Swenson. New York: Random House, 1983. 175-176.
- Smith, Ronald L. The Goldmine Comedy Record Price Guide. Iola: Krause, 1996. 124-127.
- Firesign Theatre. Forward Into The Past. Columbia Records, 1976.
