= In the Next World, You're on Your Own =

- Cover art by William Stout

Studio album by The Firesign Theatre
- Released: October 1975
- Genre: Comedy
- Length: 44:00
- Label: Columbia
- Producer: Phil Austin and David Ossman

The Firesign Theatre chronology
Everything You Know Is Wrong (1974)	In the Next World, You're on Your Own (1975)	Forward Into The Past (1976)

Professional ratings
Review scores
Source	Rating
The New Rolling Stone Record Guide	4/5 stars
The Goldmine Comedy Record Price Guide	2/4 stars

In the Next World, You're on Your Own is the ninth and last comedy album recorded by the Firesign Theatre for Columbia Records. It was released in October 1975.

== Track listing ==
=== Side one ===
1. "Police Street" – 21:30

=== Side two ===
1. "We've Lost Our Big Kabloona" – 22:30

== Detailed track information and commentary ==
The first side of the album, "Police Street", features a group of sketches interconnected by the kind of police show satire reminiscent of Phil Austin's detective fiction (Austin being best known as the detective character Nick Danger). The highlight sketch is "Give It Back," a mock game show in which losing contestants have to surrender their parents' material possessions to the Native Americans. In surreal fashion, the police satire also plays out a family drama. In this drama the main characters are: the hard-boiled Lieutenant Detective Random Coolzip; his wife, Peggy, who is also his dispatcher; their son, Skip Coolzip, a junior policeman; and their daughter, Kim, a pornographic film actress.

Several side sketches are interwoven with the police drama. In the first, a commercial for Dead Cat Soap segues into a soap opera spoof, starring Peggy. We learn that Random is rarely home, Peggy is having an affair, and Skip's ("Skipper" to his mother) sexual orientation is a scandal. In the second, Kim Coolzip presents a seductive commercial for liquid meat, which segues into her appearance on a charity fund-raising telethon. The third is the game show, in which Skip Coolzip "gives back" to Native Americans his family's car, then his father's squad car ("the black screamer"), and finally, "everything." He is also assigned, with his sister, to take over the Academy Awards celebration "with these stirring words: 'Eat flaming death, fascist media pigs.'"

The second side of the album, "We've Lost Our Big Kabloona", culminates in the hostage situation, on stage during the live broadcast of the Academy Awards. While accepting an award for a police/family drama called "Squat!," which stars their parents and seems identical to the show on the first side of the album, Skip and Kim Coolzip reveal a gun. They demand that the President of the United States appear in Hollywood "with a plane full of cash and all those broken treaties," or they will shoot the nominees one by one in alphabetical order. This sketch was inspired by Sacheen Littlefeather's appearance at the 1973 Academy Awards.

In the liner notes, thanks are given to authors Jorge Luis Borges and Raymond Chandler.

This album was the only commercial album during the group's Columbia Records period that was released under the group name but not crediting all four members as writers. The script is formally credited only to Phil Austin and David Ossman, although the other two members, Peter Bergman and Philip Proctor, honed their parts further during recording. The result did not sell well, and the label declined to renew the group's contract.

This album was recorded in the same Warner Brothers studio in Burbank, California, where John Lennon and Harry Nilsson recorded Pussy Cats. The same engineer worked on both albums.

== Release history ==
This album was originally released simultaneously on LP and 8 Track.

- LP — Columbia PC-33475
- 8 Track — Columbia PCA-33475

It has been re-released on CD at least once

- 2001 - Laugh.com LGH1078

== Memorable quotes ==
The album's quote "Eat flaming death, fascist media pigs!" may have influenced the phrase "Eat flaming death" that was popularized among hackers by the CPU Wars webcomic, and a line in issue number three of Scott McCloud's superhero comic Zot, from 1984: "Eat flaming death, you fascist pig!".

== Cover art ==
The album cover by William Stout references many of Firesign Theatre's previous albums.

- Don't Crush That Dwarf, Hand Me the Pliers
  - Morse Science High
  - Groat Cakes
  - Pico & Alvarado
  - More Sugar
  - George Papoon (first appearance, on the back cover)
- Dear Friends
  - Adult Bookstore Motel
  - Old Oildale Highway
- Everything You Know Is Wrong
  - Bear Whiz Beer

Also appearing on the back cover are all four members in cartoon form.

== External sources ==
- Firesign Theatre. In the Next World, You're on Your Own. Columbia Records, 1975.
- Firesign Theatre. Firesign Theatre
- "Firezine: Linques!." Firesign Theatre FAQ
- Marsh, Dave, and Greil Marcus. "The Firesign Theatre." The New Rolling Stone Record Guide. Ed. Dave Marsh and John Swenson. New York: Random House, 1983. 175-176.
- Smith, Ronald L. The Goldmine Comedy Record Price Guide. Iola: Krause, 1996. 124-127.
