= Rocky Rococo (disambiguation) =

Rocky Rococo is a Wisconsin-based pizza restaurant chain.

Rocky Rococo may also refer to:

- Rocky Rococo, a fictional character created by The Firesign Theatre for their Nick Danger sketches
- "Rocky Rococo", a song by Cap'n Jazz on the album Analphabetapolothology
