= I Think We're All Bozos on This Bus =

Studio album by The Firesign Theatre
- Released: August 1971
- Recorded: April–June 1971
- Genre: Comedy
- Length: 38:58
- Label: Columbia
- Producer: The Firesign Theatre

The Firesign Theatre chronology
Don't Crush That Dwarf, Hand Me the Pliers (1970)	I Think We're All Bozos on This Bus (1971)	Dear Friends (1972)

Professional ratings
Review scores
Source	Rating
The New Rolling Stone Record Guide	3/5 stars
The Village Voice	B−

I Think We're All Bozos on This Bus is the fourth comedy album made by the Firesign Theatre for Columbia Records, released in August 1971 on standard stereo vinyl LP, and Quadraphonic LP and 8-track tape. It was nominated for a Hugo Award for Best Dramatic Presentation in 1972 by the World Science Fiction Society.

The title comes from a line spoken by one of the two main characters, and contains a pun on the term computer bus since the story parodies then-developing computer technology. It also parodies Walt Disney parks.

== Plot ==
This album, like its predecessor Don't Crush That Dwarf, Hand Me the Pliers, is one complete narrative that covers both sides of one LP. The first LP side is 20 minutes 51 seconds, and the second side is 18 minutes 7 seconds.

Side one starts with an audio segue from the end of Don't Crush That Dwarf, Hand Me the Pliers: the music box tune played by the ice cream truck chased by George Tirebiter is heard approaching, played this time by a bus announcing a free Future Fair, which it touts as "a fair for all, and no fare to anybody". A trio of computer-generated holograms pop up outside the bus: the Whispering Squash (Phil Austin), the Lonesome Beet (David Ossman), and Artie Choke (Peter Bergman), singing "We're back from the shadows again" to the tune of Gene Autry's "Back in the Saddle Again". They encourage the onlookers to attend the fair, which the Beet describes as "technical stimulation" and "government-inflicted simulation". Then they disappear "back to the shadows again". A young man named Clem (Philip Proctor) boards and takes a seat next to Barney (Austin), an older man who identifies himself as a bozo (A person with a large nose that honks when squeezed. FST later revealed that "bozo" is an acronym for "brotherhood of zips and others," and that a "zip" is the type of person who enjoys doing their own taxes.); he says, "I think we're all bozos on this bus." After a stewardess tells the passengers to prepare for "a period of simulated exhilaration", broadcaster Floyd Dan (Bergman) tells them they are riding the rim of the Grand Canyon, the floor of which is five thousand feet below. The "bus" is apparently some sort of hybrid vehicle that can travel on the ground, yet turn into a jet plane which takes off for a "flight to the future".

As Clem and Barney disembark at the fair, a public address announcer directs all bozos to report for cloning, so Barney leaves Clem. The Lonesome Beet pops up and recommends Clem visit the Wall of Science. He boards a moving walkway taking him to the exhibit, which opens with a parody of religious creation myth and segues into a brief overview of history from ancient times to the emergence of mankind, then to the modern scientific era. Two scientific discoveries are reenacted: Fudd's First Law of Opposition ("If you push something hard enough, it will fall over"), and Teslicle's Deviant ("What comes in, must go out"). Then recordings of selected audience members' reactions to the future are played.

Next, the Honorable Chester Cadaver (Ossman) addresses the audience, and relates a meeting with Senator Clive Brown (Bergman), who demonstrates a "model government" consisting of a model train-sized automated maze of bureaucracies which terminates with an animatronic President as the output bus, whom Brown says everyone asks questions. When Cadaver asks Clem to state his name, he stammers slightly and says "Uh, Clem", and the central computer permanently identifies him throughout the park as "Uh, Clem". As side 1 closes, Clem is directed onto another moving walkway which takes him in to see "the President".

Side two opens with the exhibit of "the President" (Austin), who sounds like Richard Nixon. Each visitor is asked to speak their name, which is then played back to appear as if the president is addressing them by name. A black welfare recipient named Jim (Bergman) relates his family's harsh urban living conditions and asks the President where he can get a job. The President responds with a vague, positive-sounding reply only remotely related to the question and completely unrelated to Jim's concerns, and Jim is given the "bum's rush". When it is Clem's turn, he puts the President into maintenance mode by saying, "This is Worker speaking. Hello." The computer responds with the length of time that it has been running. Clem then gets access to Doctor Memory (the master control), and attempts to confuse the system with a riddle: "Why does the porridge bird lay his egg in the air?" This causes the President to shut itself down. As Clem leaves another visitor is heard to say "He broke the President!".

Clem meets up with Barney back on the Funway. They encounter sideshows such as astronaut Mark Time (Ossman) recruiting a crew for a trip to the Haunted Space Station, and Hideo Nutt's Bolt-a-drome, where fairgoers are invited to participate in boxing matches with electrical appliances such as water heaters and toasters. Public announcers repeatedly page "Mr. Ah Clem" to come to the "hospitality shelter", and Artie Choke pops up again, programmed to take lost children back to their parents. He says he will send Deputy Dan to take Clem to the hospitality shelter. Clem then uses Artie to create a clone of himself which enters the system for another confrontation with Dr. Memory. He repeats his porridge bird riddle, which the computer struggles with several attempts to parse, finally mangling it into "Why does the poor rich Barney delay laser's edge in the fair?" Clem succeeds in confusing the computer into contradicting itself, causing a total crash which ends the fair with a display of fireworks.

The entire experience is then revealed to be a vision seen in the crystal ball of a Gypsy doctor (Proctor) telling Barney his fortune. After Barney leaves, the Gypsy plots with his partner (Bergman) to make a quick escape after their last client, a sailor.

== Portrayal of theme parks and computer technology ==
The fair rides and exhibits are similar to those at Disneyland and the 1964 New York World's Fair.

Clem is one of the first "computer hackers" mentioned in pop culture, and his dialogue with the fair's computer includes messages found in the DEC PDP-10, a popular mainframe at the time. (Some of the lines are error messages from MACLISP.) An identification followed by the word "hello" initiated an interactive session on contemporary Univac, General Electric, and university timesharing systems. Many of the things the computer said were based on ELIZA, a computer program which simulated a Rogerian psychotherapist. For example, the phrase Clem used to put The President into maintenance mode, "this is Worker speaking," is based on the fact that the user could type "worker" at Eliza's command prompt, and Eliza would then display the command prompt for the Lisp software environment in which Eliza ran. And if the user neglected to end a statement or question to Eliza with a punctuation mark, Eliza's parser would fail, displaying the message "Unhappy: MkNam" to indicate that a function called "MkNam" was failing. The President said the same thing, pronouncing it "unhappy macnam."

== Award nominations ==
The album was nominated by the World Science Fiction Society in 1972 for the Hugo Award for Best Dramatic Presentation.

== Film ==
This album inspired Ivan Stang's 1973 film Let's Visit the World of the Future.

== Cultural influence ==
Apple's Siri used to respond to "This is worker speaking. Hello." with "Hello, Ah-Clem. What function can I perform for you? LOL."

== Issues and reissues ==
This album was originally released simultaneously on LP, Cassette, SQ Quad LP, and Quad 8-Track.

- LP - Columbia C-30737
- Cassette - Columbia CA-30737
- Quad LP - Columbia CQ-30737
- Quad 8 Track - Columbia CAQ - 30737

It has been re-released on CD at least three times:

- 1989 - Mobile Fidelity MFCD-785
- 2001 - CBS/Epic
- 2001 - Laugh.com LGH1073

== See also ==
- Futurama (New York World's Fair)
