= Rococo (disambiguation) =

Rococo is a style of 18th-century French art and interior design.

Rococo may also refer to:

- Rococo (band), an early 1970s progressive rock band from London, England
- Rococo Revival, a 19th-century furniture style
- "Rococo", a song from the album The Suburbs by Arcade Fire
- Rocky Rococo (pizza chain), a Wisconsin-based pizzeria chain
- "Rocky Rococo", a supporting character in the Nick Danger sketches by the Firesign Theatre
- Variations on a Rococo Theme, a cello piece by Tchaikovsky
