= Zachariah (film) =

1971 film by George Englund

Zachariah: The First Electric Western
- Theatrical release poster
- Directed by: George Englund
- Written by: Joe Massot; Phil Austin; Peter Bergman; David Ossman; Philip Proctor
- Produced by: George Englund; Lawrence Kubik
- Starring: John Rubinstein; Patricia Quinn; Don Johnson
- Cinematography: Jorge Stahl Jr.
- Edited by: Gary Griffin
- Music by: Jimmie Haskell
- Color process: Metrocolor
- Production company: ABC Pictures
- Distributed by: Cinerama Releasing Corporation
- Release date: January 24, 1971
- Running time: 93 minutes
- Country: United States
- Language: English
- Budget: $1.2 million
- Box office: $625,000

Zachariah is a 1971 American acid Western film directed by George Englund and starring John Rubinstein, Patricia Quinn and Don Johnson.

== Plot ==
After finding a mail-order gun while riding in the desert, Zachariah and his best friend, Matthew the blacksmith, begin to play with it and eventually decide to leave their small town and seek more colorful adventures as gunfighters. While following a criminal band called the Crackers into a saloon, Zachariah and Matthew are called "gay" by an older looking man, and Zachariah shoots the aggressor dead, demonstrating his quick talent for gunplay. He and Matthew strong-arm their way into joining the Crackers, but find they are inept at pulling off successful crimes, and leave them behind.

A taunting fiddler alerts Zachariah to the legendary outlaw Job Cain, and soon he and Matthew seek him out at his home saloon in the hopes of joining him. Job, whose gun skills are kept sharp through musical drumming, challenges the boys to a shootout to demonstrate their talent, but Zachariah refuses, sensing that it will lead to an eventual confrontation between himself and his friend. He leaves the compound to seek answers elsewhere, but Matthew stays behind to join Cain's organization.

Zachariah meets an Old Man living alone in the desert, who allows him to stay the night, provided he leave his gun outside the house. He alludes to the pleasures to be found in a border town called El Camino, and Zachariah rides off for there the next day. El Camino is a virtual sin city, centered around the brothel/spa operated by Belle Starr, who insists she only sleeps with affluent gunslingers. Zachariah manages to charm her into intimacy, but ultimately chooses to leave her, finding that hedonism is not what he has been seeking either. Meanwhile, Matthew has risen into a position of trust with Job Cain, but plots to ultimately surpass the gunslinger.

Zachariah returns to the Old Man's compound, where he learns about the beauty and stillness of the desert. The Old Man teaches him a mantra, "Hurry up and die", to stress the contrary notion of slowing down and enjoying the circle of change. Zachariah sheds most of his gunfighter attire and becomes more spirit-minded.

Cain announces his plan to take his men and visit El Camino, asking Matthew to watch his saloon. Matthew instead trails him and stops at the Old Man's compound, where he is reunited with Zachariah, and announces his plan to duel with Cain in El Camino. Zachariah furtively returns to practicing his shooting, anticipating his prophesied showdown with his friend. The Old Man is horrified at the return to violence, and confronts him with his spent bullets and a dead mouse, demonstrating how even when he seems to be shooting at nothing, he is still harming the desert; he tells him he will not speak to him again. The next morning, however, after Zachariah finds an arrowhead in the area where the Old Man had been searching, he breaks his silence to tell him he is ready to die, and expires soon after.

Matthew confronts Cain in El Camino, and shoots him dead. It is hinted that he too celebrates with Belle Starr. He returns to the compound, and goads Zachariah into a gunfight with him. Zachariah tries multiple means to stall the duel, but Matthew persists. The two fight hand to hand in the dirt, and Zachariah rides off, wondering aloud how Matthew seems to have learned nothing. Matthew angrily expends all his bullets, yelling threats of death, but then begins to laugh with a sense of clarity, and rides off to reunite with his "friend" in the sunset as he comes to the realisation that all he needs is Zachariah, not "all this nonsense" of being a gunfighter.

== Cast ==
- John Rubinstein as Zachariah
- Pat Quinn as Belle Starr (as Pat Quinn)
- Don Johnson as Matthew
- Country Joe and The Fish as The Crackers
- Elvin Jones as Job Cain
- Doug Kershaw as The Fiddler
- William Challee as Old Man
- Robert Ball as Stage Manager
- Dick Van Patten as The Dude
- James Gang as Job Cain's Band (as The James Gang)
- White Lightnin' as Old Man's Band
- The New York Rock Ensemble as Belle Starr's Band

== Production ==
The film is loosely based on the works of Hermann Hesse's 1922 novel Siddhartha, and 1930 novel Narcissus and Goldmund (wherein two young friends take divergent paths in life, to reunite and share similar perspectives); surrealistically adapted as a musical Western. Joe Massot said his inspiration came from when he joined the Beatles in India, when they were studying Transcendental Meditation under Maharishi Mahesh Yogi in early 1968. Massot said he arrived to find only George Harrison and John Lennon there, after their bandmates had left the course early, and the two Beatles "locked into some sort of meditation duel ... to see who was the stronger character".

Massot initially asked Harrison to provide the film's soundtrack, following his work on Wonderwall, which Massot directed. According to Levon Helm of The Band, Harrison discussed making Zachariah as an Apple Films project starring Bob Dylan and The Band, in late 1968. The following April, Rolling Stone announced that Cream's drummer Ginger Baker and The Band were to be major players in the film.

This film was billed as "The first electric Western". It features appearances and music supplied by rock bands from the 1970s, including the James Gang, New York Rock & Roll Ensemble, and Country Joe and the Fish as "The Cracker Gang". Fiddler Doug Kershaw acts and plays "The Ballad of Job Cain" as does Elvin Jones as a gunslinging drummer named Job Cain, Byard Ray and Obray Ramse appeared as the duo White Lightnin'.

== Soundtrack ==
The music and lyrics that appear in the movie soundtrack were written by:

- "We're the Crackers" — Joe McDonald
- "All I Need" — Joe McDonald
- "Poor But Honest Crackers" — Joe McDonald and Barry Melton
- "Country Fever" — The James Gang
- "Laguna Salada" — Joe Walsh, Jim Fox and Dale Peters
- "Drum Solo" — Elvin Jones
- "The Ballad of Job Cain" — Doug Kershaw
- "Grave Digger" — Michael Kamen and Martin Fulterman
- "Down in the Willow Garden" — traditional
- "Camino Waltz" — John Rubinstein
- "Shy Ann" — Byard Ray and Obray Ramsey

The New York Rock & Roll Ensemble perform Grave Digger. The soundtrack features songs by the James Gang, Joe Walsh, and Country Joe and the Fish.

Zachariah (Original Motion Picture Soundtrack), the soundtrack album, was released in 1971 as a vinyl LP by Probe Records, a subsidiary label owned by ABC Records. It contains the following titles:

Side 1:

- Zachariah (Main Title) — Jimmie Haskell
- Laguna Salada — The James Gang
- We're The Crackers — Country Joe And The Fish
- William Tell Overture — Jimmie Haskell
- All I Need — Country Joe And The Fish
- Ballad Of Job Cain — Doug Kershaw
- Country Fever — The James Gang

Side 2:

- The Lonely Ride — Jimmie Haskell
- Camino / Used Horse Salesman — Jimmie Haskell
- Camino Waltz — Jimmie Haskell
- Gravedigger — The New York Rock And Roll Ensemble
- Shy Ann — White Lightnin'
- Matthew — Jimmie Haskell
- Zachariah (End Title) — Jimmie Haskell

== Reception ==
Don Johnson later said in a 2014 interview with The A.V. Club, "they kind of loosely built it around the story of Siddhartha, and I was sort of the Govinda character."

Roger Greenspun of The New York Times wrote in a review of the film: "It is, at least in my experience, the first movie to parody the Western with the apparent intention of propagandizing homosexual love. I am aware that male relationships are a stock in trade of most Westerns and that, in Andy Warhol's brilliant 'Lonesome Cowboys,' there has already been a homosexual parody."

The film recorded a loss of $1,435,000.

On the review aggregator website Rotten Tomatoes, 50% of 6 critics' reviews are positive, with an average rating of 4.8/10. Collider lists it as one of the 10 Best Acid Westerns, amongst Alejandro Jodorowsky's El Topo, Peter Fonda's The Hired Hand, and Dennis Hopper's The Last Movie.

== Home media ==
Zachariah was released on DVD by MGM Home Video on August 24, 2004, as a Region 1 widescreen DVD, and on Blu-ray by Kino Lorber on February 5, 2019.
