= Give Us a Break (Proctor and Bergman album) =

Give Us A Break

Studio album by Proctor and Bergman
- Released: 1978
- Genre: Comedy
- Length: 32:05
- Label: Mercury
- Producer: Proctor and Bergman

Proctor and Bergman chronology
What This Country Needs (1975)	Give Us A Break (1978)

Professional ratings
Review scores
Source	Rating
AllMusic	3/5 stars
Christgau's Record Guide	C

Give Us A Break is a 1978 comedy album by comedy duo Proctor and Bergman, one half of the Firesign Theatre.

== Track listing ==
=== Side One ===
1. "Hot Rock Radio – 0:30"
2. "Carumba – 0:45" — Proctor parodies Ricardo Montalbán's Chrysler Cordoba commercials, where he extols the "rich Corinthian leather" interior
3. "Brainduster Memory School – 1:30"
4. "Whale Oil – 1:10"
5. "U.N. In Session – 3:00"
6. "Dr. X – 1:20"
7. "Consumer Watchdog – 1:25"
8. "Fab Fad Fashions – 1:30"
9. "ZBS-TV – 2:15"
10. "Ten-Shun – 1:40"
11. "C.B. Course – 1:30"

=== Side Two ===
1. "Lemon Car – 2:20"
2. "Movie Spots – 1:20"
3. "Chef Entree – 1:55"
4. "Nukes In The News – 2:35"
5. "Flu Song – 1:35"
6. "Sweetened History – 1:15"
7. "Sat Nite Gun Mart – 0:40"
8. "Sneezers Chicken – 1:20"
9. "What Did That Man Say? – 1:45"
10. "Hot Rock Radio – 0:10"
11. "Our Natural Anthem – 0:25"

== Cover art ==
The album cover shows a photographed clay sculpture by Robert Grossman, who painted the cover for the 1970 Firesign Theatre album Don't Crush That Dwarf, Hand Me the Pliers.
