= Dope Humor of the Seventies =

Comedy album by the Firesign Theatre

Compilation album by The Firesign Theatre
- Released: November 2020
- Recorded: February 1970 to March 1972
- Genre: Comedy
- Label: Stand Up!

The Firesign Theatre chronology
Duke of Madness Motors (2011)	Dope Humor of the Seventies (2020)

Dope Humor of the Seventies is a compilation album by the Firesign Theatre, released by Stand Up! Records in November 2020.

== Background ==
A sequel to the Dear Friends album, it consists of short, highly improvisational sketches distilled from the 80-hour archive set Duke of Madness Motors, originally recorded from 1970 to 1972 as part of the group's nationally syndicated Dear Friends radio show. The album was released on vinyl and digital formats, and includes liner notes with an archive of handwritten scripts and other material from the era.

== Reaction from members ==
Firesign member David Ossman called Dope Humor a sort of "dark side" to the Dear Friends album, since both were compiled from the same source, but the sketches on Dope Humor had not been constrained by the desire to keep the material radio-friendly, as had been the case for Dear Friends. Phil Proctor called it a tribute to late founding members Phil Austin and Peter Bergman.

== Reception ==
Mark Lynch, host of the WICN radio program Inquiry, praised the album as "wicked funny" and said that the humor was both a snapshot of its era and surprisingly timely in the modern era. Rich Kimball of Bangor, Maine radio station WZON said the album was full of "lost gems" that still seemed resonant: "So much of it holds up ... I feel like I could hear it on some cable news networks today and it would fit right in."

== Track listing ==
=== Side one ===
1. "Shakespeare Sunday Sunday" – 0:51
2. "Pig Science" – 3:15
3. "Truth & Consequences" – 4:28
4. "Clayton Rumcake" – 2:34
5. "Mary Warner" – 1:48
6. "Hawaii" – 2:18
7. "Jesus' Ascension Into Bakersfield" – 2:32
8. "Timmy's Birthday" – 3:11

=== Side two ===
1. "Sex Jail!" – 1:14
2. "Rules" – 1:12
3. "Drug Abuse Expert" – 1:56
4. "Pluto Water" – 5:48
5. "Bluff" – 3:03
6. "Smoke Spud" – 0:55
7. "Vince Tomaine's Leg-o-the-Crow" – 1:43
8. "Bob Dog Dog & Dog Hot Dog Son & Foot Tires" – 1:05
9. "Fiji" – 3:43

=== Side three ===
1. "Speed Kills" – 0:31
2. "Funny-Name Club Of America" – 1:45
3. "Family Bund Meeting" – 3:32
4. "The Diaphragm" – 3:36
5. "A Girl Named Bradley" – 1:44
6. "The Money Song" – 0:52
7. "Multiple Identity" – 2:19
8. "Radio Prison In Peace And War" – 6:10

=== Side four ===
1. "Louis Marshman Editorial" – 3:32
2. "The Darkening Of The Light" – 1:03
3. "Railroad Sunrise" – 2:41
4. "Trashman Rap" – 1:16
5. "Channel 18 News" – 3:18
6. "Dope Humor Of The Seventies" – 1:50
7. "K's Mart" – 1:50
8. "Bird Of Prey Motors" – 1:21
9. "Loons" – 3:22
