= TV or Not TV =

Studio album by Proctor and Bergman
- Released: 1973
- Recorded: February 1973
- Genre: Comedy
- Length: 40:33
- Label: Columbia
- Producer: Steve Gillmor

Proctor and Bergman chronology
TV or Not TV (1973)	What This Country Needs (1975)

Professional ratings
Review scores
Source	Rating
The Goldmine Comedy Record Price Guide	2/4 stars
The New Rolling Stone Record Guide	4/5 stars

TV or Not TV is the debut album by the comedy duo Proctor and Bergman. It was originally released in 1973 by Columbia Records.

Unlike most Firesign Theatre albums, it included songs ("Communist Love Song" sung by Proctor at the end of side A and "Nasi Goring" sung by Bergman in the middle of side B) as well as a TV-related plotline comparable to Don't Crush That Dwarf, Hand Me the Pliers.

== Track listing ==
The play is subtitled "A Video Vaudeville in Two Acts". Fred Flamm (Proctor) and Clark Cable (Bergman) host a pay-per-view cable television Channel 85.

=== Side one — act one ===
1. "Insert Here" (1:26) – Two children steal Dad's credit card and turn on Channel 85 for a "charged viewing cycle".
2. "Channel 85 Sign-On" (1:15) – Clark Cable (Bergman) starts the viewing cycle
3. "Escaping From The Declining Fall Of The Roaming Umpire" (5:06) – in a parody of the assassination of Julius Caesar, Flattus (Bergman) and Bruto (Proctor) plot to assassinate the "Umperor Calyuga" (Proctor), inspired by Bruto's prophetic dream of a night baseball game
4. "Police Lineup" (1:04) – Proctor as a cop who introduces a singing cop (Bergman)
5. "Salute My Boots" (1:58) – pundit Bosco Hearn (Bergman) explains currency devaluation
6. "The Channel 85 Story" (1:03) - Cable and Fred Flamm (Proctor) fund-raise; the viewer can order merchandise from his console
7. "Cirque Internationale" (3:31) – ringmaster (Bergman) introduces several zany acts, including clowns Hans and Uni who engage in an ever-escalating war which results in destruction of the Big Top
8. "Communist Love Song" (4:00) – sung by Proctor, an American in love with a Russian girl

=== Side two — act two ===
1. "Channel 85 Reply" (1:39)
2. "Tobor Radar Robot" (1:26) – a robot (Bergman) is tormented by teenage hoodlums; he ends up repelling their attack by shorting out and catching fire, despite "not being programmed for defense"
3. "The Pills Brothers On Drugs" (0:56) – an ironic, supposedly anti-drug public service announcement (PSA)
4. "The Mz. Information Show" (3:51) – a female holographic "simulette" (Proctor) who hosts a talk show, assuming various identities (Bergman voices the host when Proctor plays the guest); interviews an inarticulate author of an ecologically-themed book (Proctor)
5. "Bring Us Together" (0:24) – a PSA
6. "Nasi Goring" (2:50) (Bergman/C.D.Taylor) – a singing gorilla (Bergman), one of Ms. Information's guests; the name parodies an Indonesian fried rice dish.
7. "Our Lady Of The Torch" (0:28) – (Proctor); another PSA parodies the inscription on the Statue of Liberty
8. "Emergency Alert" (1:35) – teenagers who have been attempting to hack into Channel 85 are finally wiped by the automatic system
9. "Emerging Fall Of The Roaming Umpire" (4:19) – the conspirators carry out their plan to "dump the Ump" (Proctor)
10. "Give Up This Day" (1:30) – the Rear Reverend Sport Trendleberg (Proctor) gives a benediction
11. "Channel 85 Sign-Off" (1:08) – close of the viewing cycle
12. "Insert Here" (0:53) – the system automatically solicits another viewing cycle

== Critical reception ==
Critically this album received the best notices out of all of The Firesign Theatre's side projects. The New Rolling Stone Record Guide gives the album 4 out of 5 stars and says that Proctor and Bergman "melds [their] characteristic Joycean wit with some hilarious slapstick routines" (404), while The Goldmine Comedy Record Price Guide says that Proctor and Bergman "seem like Wayne and Shuster on acid" (272). While The Goldmine Guide only gives this particular album 2 stars, this is still a higher notice than any other album by one of The Firesign Theatre's side projects.

== Issues and reissues ==
This album was originally released simultaneously on LP, 8 Track, and Cassette:

- LP — KC-32199
- Cassette — CT-32199
- 8 track — CA-32199

It has been re-released on CD at least once:

- 2001 - Laugh.com LGH1152
