= Nick Danger =

- Created by: The Firesign Theatre
- Portrayed by: Phil Austin

In-universe information
- Occupation: Private investigator

Nick Danger is a fictional character created by the comedy group The Firesign Theatre, portrayed by Phil Austin. Danger is a parody of the hard-boiled detective, and is often announced as "Nick Danger, Third Eye", a parody of the term private eye. Danger stories involve stereotypical film noir situations, including mistaken identity, betrayal, and femmes fatales. Danger originally appears on the 1969 album How Can You Be in Two Places at Once When You're Not Anywhere at All, and is reprised in the 1979 Nick Danger: The Case of the Missing Shoe, 1984 The Three Faces of Al, and 2001 The Bride of Firesign.

He's based on the [Dashiell] Hammett Sam Spade character, but as I got more into writing him over the years, he's become much more like [Philip] Marlowe. I love [Raymond] Chandler's writing.

— Phil Austin

== Development ==
In January 1969, while the Firesign Theatre's radio show Radio Free Oz was running on KMET (FM), the Firesigns wrote a pilot script for a show inspired by Fred Allen's 1942 show Allen's Alley, to be broadcast live from the Los Angeles Elks Hall near MacArthur Park. The script contained a third act based on a hardboiled detective Nick Danger, modeled after Yours Truly, Johnny Dollar. When KMET rejected the pilot, the Firesigns expanded the script to a 28-minute mock radio play, which they recorded in January and February. This was released in July as the second side of their second album, How Can You Be in Two Places at Once When You're Not Anywhere at All.

== Supporting characters ==
A constant thorn in Danger's side is police Lieutenant Alvin Bradshaw, portrayed by Peter Bergman. Bradshaw is resentful of Danger's "intrusion" into police business, jealous of his appeal to women, and suspicious of his honesty, constantly looking for a chance to catch him in a felony (he specifically blames Danger for the botched arrest and subsequent escape of a pederast). Bradshaw's dream is to become district attorney and prosecute Danger for a capital crime.

One of Danger's criminal nemeses is Rocky Rococo (Philip Proctor), described as a "little man" and a "sleazy weasel", based on Dashiell Hammett's Joel Cairo as portrayed by Peter Lorre in the 1941 film The Maltese Falcon. In the role, Proctor imitates Lorre's distinctive voice. In pictures supplied with the How Can You Be in Two Places... album, Bergman portrays Rococo, creating the image of a bald man wearing a fez.

Danger's old college flame, Betty Jo Bialosky (Proctor), uses several aliases: Melanie Haber, Audrey Farber, and Susan Underhill, but "everyone knew her as Nancy." Rococo's and Nancy's names are a gag based on the Beatles song "Rocky Raccoon". In the original Danger episode, Bergman voices Nancy in one scene where she appears with Rococo.

Nancy's butler Dan Catherwood (David Ossman) is secretly Nancy's husband. He has Ossman's distinctive old man voice, and is found to be 1000 years old, as a result of having invented a time machine and making a round trip to ancient Greece.

== Firesign appearances ==
A boxed set of most Firesign Theater performances containing Nick Danger was released in 2008 as The Firesign Theatre's Box of Danger.

=== The Further Adventures of Nick Danger ===
Danger debuts in a 28:11 track on side 2 of the 1969 album How Can You Be in Two Places at Once When You're Not Anywhere at All. This is an episode titled "Cut 'Em Off at the Past", of a mock radio program purportedly aired on December 6, 1941. Rocky Rococo comes to Danger's office and attempts to sell him the ring Danger gave Nancy back in college. Danger goes to the mansion where Nancy lives and meets her butler Catherwood. After knocking Danger unconscious, Catherwood and Nancy murder Rococo, who is blackmailing them. They attempt to frame Danger for their crime, but Danger forces Catherwood to reveal the truth, and solves his problem by some means we will never know; the show is interrupted by the news bulletin of President Franklin Delano Roosevelt (Bergman) announcing the Japanese attack on Pearl Harbor.

Danger's origin is surreally explained on the album's first side title track, where a stream of consciousness flip of the TV dial includes a brief snippet of a show or movie which depicts three deranged hoodlums discussing how much they "hate cops". Their leader, Nick, vows to "get even with every rotten cop in this city" by turning in his badge and burning his uniform.

=== Young Guy Motor Detective ===
On the 1972 live album Not Insane or Anything You Want To, the group presented a self-parody of Nick Danger. This has Austin playing the title role as a Japanese detective Young Guy, Proctor as his Japanese girlfriend Miki, Ossman as the detective's robotic Japanese butler Rotonoto, and Bergman as American police Lieutenant Brad Shaw.

=== School For Actors ===
In 1976, while Proctor and Bergman went on sabbatical from The Firesign Theatre to produce a live show, Austin and Ossman produced a two-act live show, Radio Laffs of 1940. Act one pits Danger against a cabal of Nazi spies conspiring to remake America by converting its radio drama to dadaist surreal humor. Bergman's absence forced the omission of Lieutenant Bradshaw, and Ossman voiced all the non-Danger roles, including several females.

=== The Case of the Missing Shoe ===
In 1979, the Firesign Theatre produced five short (2:24) episodes of a prospective comic radio serial (similar to the 1960s syndicated Chickenman). These were released by Rhino Records on a 12:00 EP record.

=== The Three Faces of Al ===
This 1984 album was produced without David Ossman, who had temporarily left to produce shows for National Public Radio. This story is inspired by a line in the original "Cut 'Em Off at the Past" where Bradshwaw tells Danger, "You're lucky we didn't burn ya on the Anselmo pederasty case." Bradshaw has realized his dream to become District Attorney, and gets his chance to prosecute Danger, who is the apparent suspect in the murder of mob boss Anselmo Von Pederazzi. Nancy and Rocky Rococo also appear.

=== The Bride of Firesign ===
This album was produced in 2001, after the Firesign Theatre staged a comeback with Ossman returned to the group. It is the third album in a "millennial trilogy" titled We're Doomed.

=== Shack Out On the Alien Highway ===
In October 2001, the Firesign Theatre got a series on XM Satellite Radio titled Fools In Space. They produced seven serial Nick Danger episodes for this show, broadcast between October 27, 2001, and August 24, 2002.

=== All Things Firesign ===
The Firesigns performed approximately once a month on NPR's All Things Considered news program from July 2002 to April 2003, released on a CD album in 2003. Two performances, on October 3 and December 24, featured Nick Danger. The Christmas Eve show featured a parody of the poem A Visit from St. Nicholas.

=== Film ===
The character also features in the Firesign-produced film Nick Danger in The Case of the Missing Yolk

== Other appearances ==
A stage production of Nick Danger, Third Eye premiered February 8, 2012 at the Powel Crosley Mansion in Sarasota, Florida. This was the first professional theatrical performance of "Nick Danger" and starred Keith Chrismon as Nick Danger, Joelle Davis as Nancy, and John Forsyth, Marty Fugate and Karle Murdock as multiple characters. Larry Barrett produced and directed the production; Steve Patmagrian was its associate producer. A student production of Nick Danger, Third Eye was staged in the Fisher Theater Workshop At Phillips Exeter Academy in 1978.

The character also appeared as the trademark of a clothing line during the 2000s and early 2010s. Phil Austin also appears as Nick Danger in a Sparks Media production entitled "Down Under Danger", the only Danger adventure that has a female character as the femme fatale.
