= CPU Wars =

Underground comic strip by Charles Andres

CPU Wars is an underground comic strip by Charles Andres that circulated around Digital Equipment Corporation and other computer manufacturers starting in 1977. It described a hypothetical invasion of Digital's slightly disguised Maynard, Massachusetts ex-woolen mill headquarters (now located in Barnyard, Mass) by troops from IPM, the Impossible to Program Machine Corporation in a rather-blunt-edged parody of IBM. The humor hinged on the differences in style and culture between the invading forces of IPM and the laid-back employees of the Human Equipment Corporation. For example, even at gunpoint, the employees were unable to lead the invading forces to their leaders because they had no specific leaders as a result their corporation's use of matrix management.

The comic was drawn by a DEC employee, initially anonymous and later self-revealed to be Charles Andres. A compendium of the strips was finally published in 1980.

The most notable trace of the comic is the phrase Eat flaming death, supposedly derived from a famously turgid line in a World War II-era anti-Nazi propaganda comic that ran “Eat flaming death, non-Aryan mongrels!” or something of the sort (however, it is also reported that on the Firesign Theatre's 1975 album In The Next World, You're On Your Own a character won the right to scream “Eat flaming death, fascist media pigs” in the middle of Oscar night on a game show; this may have been an influence). Used in humorously overblown expressions of hostility. “Eat flaming death, EBCDIC users!”
