= J-Men Forever =

- Directed by: Richard Patterson
- Written by: Peter Bergman; Philip Proctor
- Produced by: Patrick Curtis; William Howard; Willy Schopfer
- Starring: Peter Bergman; M. G. Kelly; Philip Proctor
- Cinematography: Bruce Logan
- Edited by: Gail Werbin
- Music by: Richard H. Theiss
- Distributed by: Pan-Canadian Film Distributors; International Harmony (US)
- Release date: 1979
- Running time: 73 minutes
- Country: United States
- Language: English

J-Men Forever, originally titled "The Secret World War", is a 1979 comedy film by Philip Proctor and Peter Bergman of the Firesign Theatre. The film is a pastiche using film clips from Republic serials, re-dubbed with comic dialog to tell a tale of world conquest by sex, drugs and rock and roll.

== Summary ==
In the film, the Lightning Bug, embodied by garish villains from several serials, attempts to take over the world with rock and roll. He later adds sex and drugs when music alone doesn't work. He explains his changing appearance by saying, "I'm bringing all five of my costumes!" The Lightning Bug is voiced by legendary radio DJ M.G. Kelly (also called "Machine Gun" Kelly).

Peter Bergman plays The Chief and Philip Proctor plays Agent Barton. They appear in period-style black and white sequences that are used to frame the re-dubbed clips of car chases, explosions, flying men, sinister villains and villainesses, fights, and various other perils that are strung together in a somewhat incoherent plot.

== Plot ==
The Bug's first victims are square record moguls Lawrence Milk and Jive Davis, who are hypnotized or otherwise prodded into killing themselves, and bandleader 'Screen' Dorsey, whose car is booby trapped and then run off a cliff. The Bug, his henchmen and henchwomen (including the villainess Sombra) are opposed by the J-Men, a group of government agents hired by the legendary J. Eager Believer.

Besides the Chief and his bumbling sidekick, Agent Barton, the J-Men include Agents Spike, Claire and Lance, Buzz Cufflink, Yank Smellfinger, James Armhole, Rocket Jock (clips of Commando Cody from Radar Men from the Moon), the Lone Star (clips from Captain America), the Caped Madman (clips of Captain Marvel from Adventures of Captain Marvel; who transforms by using the phrase "Sh-Boom"), Spy Swatter (clips from Spy Smasher), Sleeve Coat, Juicy Withers, and Admiral Balzy. Many of them appear to die horrible, inescapable deaths in the course of the film.

The J-Men work in cooperation with the F.C.C. (Federal Culture Control), opposing the Lightning Bug with Muzac (created by M.U.S.A.C., the Military Underground Sugared Airwaves Command), then with a bomb to blow up the Lightning Bug's base on the Moon. However, the Lightning Bug beats them to it, by turning his stereo up too loud and blowing up the Moon himself (and all of New York City in the process, which the J-Men consider a "double victory").

At the end of the film, Agent Barton mournfully recites the list of J-Men who supposedly gave their lives in the epic struggle against the Bug. The Chief laughs, then starts choking on a cigar he is smoking. After he stops choking, The Chief points out that J-Men are flexible enough to survive any life-threatening situation, and the final clips (from the following week's edition of the serial) show exactly how each J-Man escaped their particular peril.

== Soundtrack ==
The movie's classic rock soundtrack features music from Budgie, The Tubes, Head East and Billy Preston.

== Release ==
The film did not get notice during its theatrical run, but two years afterwards was popular enough when it was brought up by International Harmony head Stuart Shapiro on the USA Network show Night Flight to the point of a cult following. It was released on DVD November 19, 2002 by Cult DVD.

== See also ==
- What's Up Tiger Lily
- Hercules Returns
- Dead Men Don't Wear Plaid
