= Duke of Madness Motors =

2010 book and DVD archive by the Firesign Theatre

Duke of Madness Motors: The Complete "Dear Friends" Radio Era

Compilation album by The Firesign Theatre
- Released: December 16, 2010
- Recorded: 1970–1972
- Genre: Comedy
- Label: Seeland Records
- Producer: The Firesign Theatre, Taylor Jessen

The Firesign Theatre chronology
The Firesign Theatre's Box of Danger (2008)	Duke of Madness Motors: The Complete "Dear Friends" Radio Era (2010)	Dope Humor of the Seventies (2020)

Duke of Madness Motors: The Complete "Dear Friends" Radio Era is a book and data DVD set collecting the complete works of comedy group the Firesign Theatre's 1970s radio shows Firesign Theatre Radio Hour Hour, Dear Friends, and Let's Eat.

The set includes a 108-page book containing a historical essay, interviews, original scripts, and collages by Firesign founder Phil Proctor.

The data DVD contains more than 80 hours of material on MP3 audio, including 24 episodes of Firesign Theatre Radio Hour Hour, 21 episodes of Dear Friends, 12 episodes of Let's Eat, and a 1972 series finale, Martian Space Party. The collections were digitally remastered and annotated by the group's archivist and producer, Taylor Jessen along with several contributors including longtime Firesign Theater producer Bill McIntyre Dear Friends and Let's Eat are each collected in both their original broadcast versions and later syndication edits.

== Production ==
The project took more than 10 years to complete. Proctor told the Library of Congress in an interview that the material was gathered from archives in "our basements, garages, sheds" and "entire reel-to-reel recordings" made by fans during the original broadcasts. Jessen recovered one tape from a shed which had been buried under a mudslide.

The album was released on Seeland Records, the label run by experimental band Negativland; co-founder Peter Conheim cited Firesign Theatre as a direct influence on Negativland and hailed them as "pioneers of freely improvised radio".

== Related albums ==
The group's 1972 compilation album Dear Friends was collected from the same radio sessions gathered in Duke of Madness Motors.

Dope Humor of the Seventies, a compilation album released by Stand Up! Records in November 2020, was distilled from the Duke of Madness Motors archive. The group considers the album a sequel to Dear Friends.

== Track listing ==
Firesign Theatre Radio Hour Hour

1. "Yes Mistress!" (1/25/1970)
2. "Pants The Bourgeoisie" (2/1/1970)
3. "The El Droog Symposium" (2/8/1970)
4. "I'm Not Saying They Do It, I'm Just Saying You've Seen It" (2/15/1970)
5. "KWKWT-TV" (2/22/1970)
6. "Live At The Basilica Of The Blessed Gaffe" (3/8/1970)
7. "New New Ork" (3/15/1970)
8. "Znachki" (3/15/1970)
9. "Everyone In New York Is A Communist" (3/22/1970)
10. "Easter Sunday Sunday!" (3/29/1970)
11. "Castaneda Your Bread Upon The Waters" (4/5/1970)
12. "We'll Be Heironymous Bosch In Jest A Minute, But Faust..." (4/12/1970)
13. "Zizzing And Dripping With The RAF" (4/19/1970)
14. "One Slave Whip, Leather, 57-½ Inches" (4/26/1970)
15. "We're Having Authorized Possessed Molluscs For Dinner" (5/3/1970)
16. "I Ain't Got No Body And Nobody Cares For My Grave" (5/17/1970)
17. "There's Been A Lot Of Trouble Out Here, You Know" (5/24/1970)
18. "Zen Hijinks Marathon" (5/31/1970)
19. "The Lone Ranger Vs. Your Developing Breasts" (6/7/1970)
20. "My Faith Is My Gas Mask" (6/14/1970)
21. "There's A Franciscan Friar Out There Right Now Who's Dyin'" (6/21/1970)
22. "The Boss Sound 1010 WINS Munich" (6/28/1970)
23. "Only The Blackness Behind Me Is Real" (7/5/1970)
24. "This Is One Avant-Garde Script You Won't Get Out Of" (7/12/1970)

Dear Friends

1. "Don't Open The Door On Reality" (9/9/1970)
2. "Big Brother Is Washing" (9/16/1970)
3. "Louis P. Illuminato's Church of Everything" (9/23/1970)
4. "...I Could Always Shoot Him With The Camera" (10/4/1970)
5. "Somebody Put A Mickey In The Ground Zero" (10/11/1970)
6. "A Funny Thing Happened On The Way To The Inquisition" (10/18/1970)
7. "Power Is Trouble & Trouble's Not Funny" (10/25/1970)
8. "Deputy Dan Will Find Us No Matter Where We Go" (11/1/1970)
9. "Live At The Ash Grove" (11/15/1970)
10. "The Harry Yagoda Show" (11/22/1970)
11. "Was There A Cow On The Moon?" (11/29/1970)
12. "Happy Harry's Confession Booth" (12/6/1970)
13. "All We Have To Fear Is Me" (12/13/1970)
14. "Hello Russia? Merry Christmas!" (12/20/1970)
15. "Hour Of Ecstasy" (12/27/1970)
16. "Dick Nixon Chevrolet" (1/3/1971)
17. "Dr. Memory's Laff-A-While News" (1/10/1971)
18. "All Nite Images" (1/17/1971)
19. "Welcome To Microorganism State Park" (1/24/1971)
20. "Natural Disaster Telethon" (2/3/1971)
21. "An Inch Closer To San Francisco" (2/17/1971)

Let's Eat

1. "Hey, Banana Nose!" (11/11/1971)
2. "The Whisperin' Squash Show" (11/18/1971)
3. "Radio Prison In Peace And War" (12/9/1971)
4. "Xmas In Ratland" (12/16/1971)
5. "The Filipino Cheeseball War" (1/6/1972)
6. "I Hear Noise In Charles Throat" (1/13/1972)
7. "The New Archipelago Show" (1/20/1972)
8. "Pastor Firesign's Pirate Radio Ministry Of The Air" (1/27/1972)
9. "The Harry Cox Show" (2/3/1972)
10. "The Underworld Olympics" (2/10/1972)
11. "Year Of The Rat" (2/17/1972)
12. "The Hilerio Spacepipe Show" (2/24/1972)
13. "Martian Space Party" (3/30/1972)

== Personnel ==
- Producer: The Firesign Theatre
- Reissue producer: Taylor Jessen
