= Rocky Rococo =

American pizza restaurant chain

Rocky Rococo Pizza and Pasta
- Type: Private
- Industry: Restaurant, delivery
- Founded: Madison, Wisconsin, U.S. (1974; 52 years ago)
- Headquarters: Oconomowoc, Wisconsin, United States
- Number of locations: 31 (as of 2025)
- Key people: Thomas R. (Tom) Hester, CEO and owner; Trey Hester, president and CEO; Wayne Mosley, founder/franchisee; Roger Brown, founder/franchisee
- Products: Pizza, pasta, salad
- Revenue: US$ 41,000,000
- Parent: Rocky Rococo Corporation
- Website: rockyrococo.com

Rocky Rococo Pizza and Pasta is a chain of North American restaurants that specializes in pan-style pizza sold by the slice. It was founded in Madison, Wisconsin, in 1974 by Wayne Mosley and Roger Brown, who took the name from a character invented in 1969 by the Fireside Theatre. The chain grew as large as 120 stores in 1986, and the owners sold the franchise rights to another partner and group of investors in 1988. As of 2025, there are 31 locations, 30 in Wisconsin and one in Minnesota.

== History ==
Wayne Mosley and Roger Brown opened their first store in Madison, Wisconsin in 1974. The name "Rocky Rococo" was invented in 1969 by the Firesign Theatre for a villain in the "Further Adventures of Nick Danger" sketch on their second comedy album, How Can You Be in Two Places at Once When You're Not Anywhere at All. The character was based on Dashiell Hammett's Joel Cairo as portrayed by Peter Lorre in the 1941 film The Maltese Falcon. The name is a parody of a character invented by the Beatles for their song "Rocky Raccoon". The Firesign character is described as a dwarf and depicted as bald and wearing a fez.

To design their restaurant's logo, Mosley and Brown hired a Madison artist to sketch a character based on the White Spy character from Mad Magazine, and hired comic actor Jim Pederson to portray their "Rocky Rococo" mascot as a moustachioed Italian wearing a white suit, wide-brimmed hat, and sunglasses.

== Copyright dispute ==
The Firesign Theatre visited the first Rocky Rococo Pizza when on tour in Madison in 1975, and reacted with good humor, joking around with the owners and giving them pictures that said, "To Rocky, from Rocky" which were hung on the wall. But in 1985, when the chain had grown to 62 restaurants, the Firesign Theatre sent the owners a letter claiming ownership of the name. Their lawyers found a similar case where an Austin, Texas, pizzeria named Conan's ran afoul of the copyright owners, producers of the 1982 film Conan the Barbarian. Since the creator of the Conan the Barbarian comic had similarly endorsed the restaurant by drawing Conan on its walls, the suit lost in the United States Court of Appeals for the Fifth Circuit. The Firesigns thus settled out of court.

By 1986, the chain had grown to 120 stores, according to the company. Mosley and Brown sold the franchise rights to Tom Hester and a group of investors in 1988. At one time, the chain generated about $40 million in annual sales.

== Locations ==
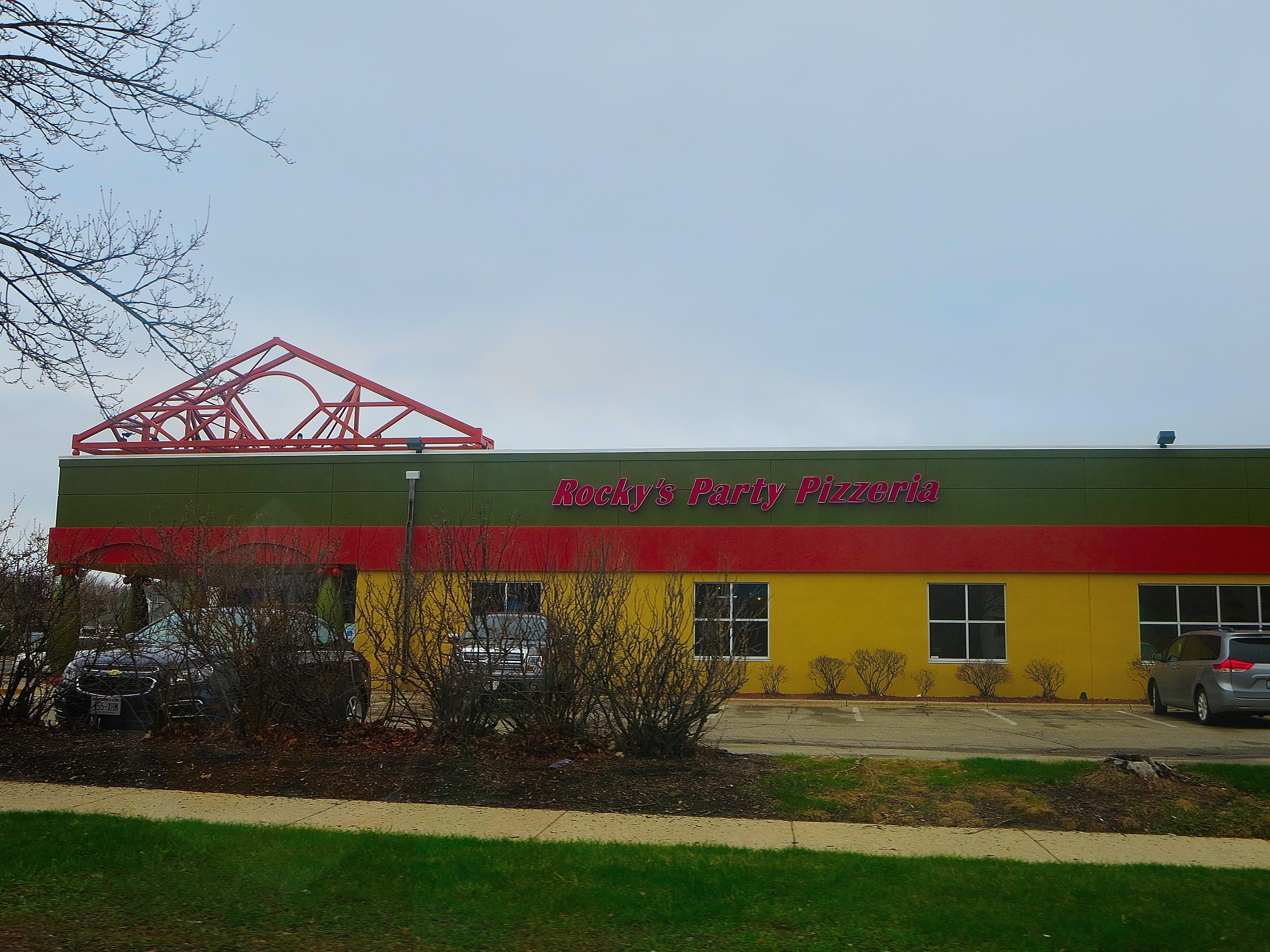
Location in Madison, Wisconsin

As of 2025, there are 31 locations, 30 in Wisconsin and one in Minnesota. A Spokane, Washington location closed in 2020 after 35 years of business. The chain previously had locations in Florida, Iowa, Colorado, Oklahoma, Nebraska, Missouri, Indiana, Illinois, Kentucky, and Ohio.

== See also ==
- List of pizza chains of the United States
