= M. G. Kelly =

American actor, announcer, and radio personality (born 1952)

- Born: Gary Sinclair; 1954 (age 71–72); Ada, Oklahoma, U.S.
- Occupations: Disc jockey; actor; announcer
- Years active: 1972–present

Gary D. Sinclair (born 1954), known professionally as Michael Gary "M.G." Kelly and Machine Gun Kelly, is an American actor, disc jockey, and radio personality. In addition to hosting several radio programs over the years, Kelly has held several acting roles as a disc jockey; also, he has served as an offstage announcer on two game shows.

His stage name is a reference to George "Machine Gun" Kelly, a notorious criminal.

== Radio career ==
Kelly has hosted and produced several radio programs. Several are still airing on stations across the United States and Canada; production and distribution of his current shows went on a brief hiatus in the late 2000s but have since resumed. He worked at KSTP in the Minneapolis/St. Paul market from 1972 through 1975. During the 1970s and '80s, Kelly enjoyed much success as a radio personality on Los Angeles radio stations KHJ, KTNQ, KOST and KODJ.

Programs produced by Kelly include:

- Live from the 60s (1986–93, reruns from 1993 to 1996 and 2015–present), hosted by "The Real Don Steele," a retrospective on the 1960s featuring 1960s music, distributed by Premiere Networks. Reruns as of 2015 distributed by Compass Media Networks.
- American Hit List (1998–present) similar in format to Live from the 60s except hosted by Kelly himself. This series featured a broader playlist stretching the 1950s to the 1970s, with a focus on 1964–73. This is the only Kelly program distributed by Westwood One. An updated version, Classic Hit List, has also been offered since the mid-2010s, which includes more 1980s songs and a classic rock lean; this show is currently distributed by Compass Media Networks.
- Back to the 70s (1998–2007, 2011–present). First 52 episodes hosted by Charlie Tuna, airing in reruns through 2007; subsequent revival (ca. 2011) hosted by Kelly himself and distributed by Compass.
- The Amazing 80s (1998–present) hosted by Kelly, marketed as a direct competitor to Backtrax USA. Distributed by Compass.
- Your 90s Rewind (2015–present) hosted by Kelly.
- Top 30 USA (1980s), AC Radio top 30 countdown (or as the show implies a CountUP show) hosted by Kelly and distributed by CBS Radio
- Your Good Time Oldies Magazine (1992–95), co-hosted by Kelly and Charlie Tuna

== Acting career ==
M. G. Kelly's acting career includes a role as DJ "Bebe Jesús" in the 1976 film A Star Is Born, starring Barbra Streisand and the role of Father John Voss in the Clint Eastwood film The Enforcer, as well as many television roles, including two CHiPs episodes from 1978 and the 1979 WKRP in Cincinnati episode titled "Fish Story". He also provided the voice of the villain The Lightning Bug in the 1979 serial spoof J-Men Forever.

In addition to acting, Kelly served a short stint as announcer on the game show The Pop 'N Rocker Game, hosted by Jon Bauman. In late 1988, he took over as the announcer on Wheel of Fortune following the death of former announcer Jack Clark in mid-1988. Kelly announced both the daytime network version of the show and the nighttime, syndicated version hosted by Pat Sajak until March 1989. Kelly was succeeded by Charlie O'Donnell, the original announcer of the daytime version, who remained with the show until his death in 2010.

== Partial filmography ==
Year	Title	Role	Notes
1976	A Star Is Born	Bebe Jesus	
1976	The Enforcer	Father John	
1978	The Buddy Holly Story	Avalon M.C.	
1978	The Fifth Floor	Hal	
1978	CHiPs	Himself	Episode: "Peaks and Valleys"
1979	Roller Boogie	D.J.	
1979	J-Men Forever	Lightning Bug	Voice role
1984	Voyage of the Rock Aliens	Radio DJ	
1984	Night Patrol	Hotel Manager	
1989	Body Slam	T.V. Interviewer	
1989	Lobster Man from Mars	Big Dick Strange	
1989	UHF	Promo Announcer	Voice role
