= Waiting for the Electrician or Someone Like Him =

Studio album by The Firesign Theatre
- Released: January 1968
- Recorded: 1967
- Genre: Comedy
- Length: 42:00
- Label: Columbia
- Producer: Gary Usher, The Firesign Theatre

The Firesign Theatre chronology
Waiting for the Electrician or Someone Like Him (1968)	How Can You Be in Two Places at Once When You're Not Anywhere at All (1969)

Professional ratings
Review scores
Source	Rating
Rolling Stone	(favorable)

Waiting for the Electrician or Someone Like Him is the first comedy album recorded by the Firesign Theatre. It was originally released in January 1968 by Columbia Records.

== Synopsis ==
The first side of the original LP presented a trilogy of three related plays, presented as continuously connected tracks progressing in time. The second side presented a longer, separate play.

=== "Temporarily Humboldt County" ===
The first section runs 9 min 14 sec, and satirizes the displacement of the American Indians (David Ossman and Phil Austin), first by Spanish conquistadors, then by American frontiersmen, and finally by the US government forcing them onto a reservation, which it uses as a "cobalt testing range". The title comes from friends of the Firesign Theatre telling them that the local Indians in Humboldt County, California added "temporarily" to the name as a way of saying no one could really own the land and to give it the initialism THC. The section ends with a bomb explosion, followed by the sound of wind blowing, and the Indians coming out of it portraying a raid in a Hollywood western.

=== "W. C. Fields Forever" ===
This 7 min 39 sec track segues as the Indians wander silently through the desert and come upon Peter Bergman welcoming them to the "Lazy O Magic Circle Dudes Ranch and Collective Love Farm", a hippie commune. The commune's spiritual leader, the perpetually drunk/stoned "Tiny Doctor Tim" (Proctor), is a parody of Timothy Leary. Philip Proctor's impersonation of W. C. Fields actually appeared on the first track, dedicating the cobalt testing range; this track title parodies the Beatles song "Strawberry Fields Forever".

=== "Le Trente-Huit Cunégonde" ===
This 7 min 19 sec track segues into a future world in which the 1960s hippie counterculture has now replaced the mainstream cultural establishment. Police (Proctor and Bergman) patrol searching for "non-groovy" people not in possession of drugs, such as a grandmother (Austin) whom they arrest to be "returned for re-grooving". A teenager named Malcolm X John Lennon (Austin) is still being breast-fed by his mother (Proctor), and gets in trouble with his school principal (Proctor) for studying instead of hanging out and "relating" with his peers by smoking marijuana. A US senator who sounds like Robert F. Kennedy (Proctor) chairs a committee which also returns people for re-grooving, and the "Secretary of Peace" (Ossman) directs bomber aircraft to drop copies of Naked Lunch on Nigeria.

=== Side two: "Waiting for The Electrician or Someone Like Him" ===
This single, 17 min 48 sec track begins as a Turkish language instruction record, and immediately follows its listener on a Kafkaesque trip overseas. An unnamed innocent (Austin) is manipulated by mysterious strangers and authority figures into situations beyond his control. (In the written script, the character is called simply "P." for Phil, a reference to Kafka's use of "K." in The Castle.)

A highlight of side two is the "Beat the Reaper" sketch, a mock game show in which the contestant (Austin) is injected with a disease and must guess what it is in order to win the antidote; if the contestant fails to self-diagnose, he is sent home with the disease. This segment is also featured on both the Forward Into The Past and Shoes for Industry: The Best of the Firesign Theatre compilation albums.

== Issues and reissues ==
Waiting for the Electrician or Someone Like Him was originally released on Mono LP, Stereo LP, and 8-Track.

- Mono LP: Columbia CL-2718
- Stereo LP: Columbia CS-9518
- 8 track: 18C-09518

It has been re-released on CD at least three times

- 1992: Mobile Fidelity MFCD-762
- 2001: Sony
- 2001: Laugh.com LGH1071

Some of the 2001 Sony CDs omit the first 16 seconds of the beginning of track 4 due to a mastering error. The defective Sony re-release and some non-defective copies also end with an un-marked bonus track "The Mantras and The Chakras". This track, lasting 4:08, is not included on any other Firesign release.

== Cover ==
On the cover of the LP the name of the group is rendered "Firesign Theater." On their next album, How Can You Be in Two Places at Once When You're Not Anywhere at All, the name is spelled "Firesign Theatre." The latter spelling has been used consistently since that time.

== Citations ==
- Firesign Theatre (1968). Waiting for the Electrician or Someone Like Him. Columbia.
- "Firesign Theatre FAQ". FIREZINE: Linques!.
- "Firesign Theatre — Waiting for the Electrician CD".
