= How Can You Be in Two Places at Once When You're Not Anywhere at All =

Studio album by The Firesign Theatre
- Released: July 1969
- Genre: Comedy
- Length: 56:38
- Label: Columbia
- Producer: Cyrus Faryar

The Firesign Theatre chronology
Waiting for the Electrician or Someone Like Him (1968)	How Can You Be in Two Places at Once When You're Not Anywhere at All (1969)	Don't Crush That Dwarf, Hand Me the Pliers (1970)

Professional ratings
Review scores
Source	Rating
Allmusic	link
Robert Christgau	A+ link
The New Rolling Stone Record Guide	5/5 stars

How Can You Be in Two Places at Once When You're Not Anywhere at All is the second comedy album recorded by the Firesign Theatre. It was originally released in July 1969 by Columbia Records.

== Track listing ==
=== Side one ===
This side of the vinyl LP was not divided into separate tracks, but the liner notes list the following titles and tracks:

1. "How Can You Be in Two Places at Once When You're Not Anywhere at All" – 28:27:
  1. "Drink to Me Only with Thine Fox" (Mr. Catherwood and Ensemble) [CD retitle: "The Ralph Spoilsport Mantrum"] – 4:21
  2. "The Policemen's Brawl" (Officers Bradshaw and Henderson) [CD retitle: "Zeno's Evil"] – 4:34
  3. "Yankee Doodle Came to Terms" (All Fecal People's Chorus) [CD retitle: "The Land of the Pharaohs"] – 2:47
  4. "Über Dubbing Over Alice" ('Arry 'N' Friends) [CD Track retitle: "VACANCY-NO VACANCY"] – 1:34
  5. "You Ain't Got No Friends on the Left" (Babe and the Unknown Soldiers) [CD retitle: "The Lonesome American Choo-Choo Don' Wan' Stop Here Any Mo'"] – 7:34
  6. "'We're Bringing the War Back Home!' from 'Babes in Khaki'" (Lilly Lamont*) (*Miss Lamont Courtesy of Paranoid Pictures) – 7:31 [split into 2 tracks on the CD, track titles below]:
    1. "Babes in Khaki" – 3:53
    2. "TV or Not TV" – 3:38

=== Side two ===
1. The Further Adventures of Nick Danger – 28:11

"From the Archives of the Original Firesign Theatre Radio Hour. As First Broadcast December 6, 1941. Rebroadcast Courtesy of Loostners Bros. Soap Co."

== Synopsis ==
The album consists of two 28-minute pieces, each taking up one side of the original vinyl release.

=== "How Can You Be in Two Places at Once When You're Not Anywhere at All" ===
This opens with a late-night TV commercial by car salesman Ralph Spoilsport (Philip Proctor), a spoof of Southern California Ford dealer Ralph Williams. As he extols the virtues of a featured new car, the main character Babe (Peter Bergman), runs across traffic onto the lot and interrupts Ralph's spiel with an immediate desire to buy the car in question. Ralph enthusiastically invites Babe to take a look inside his "beautiful new home". The impossibly luxurious car contains a "home entertainment system", with AM and FM radio and television. Spoilsport turns on each component in turn, creating a cacophonous din.

Babe buys the car and, as he drives it, the text of road signs and billboards along the road is spoken as he passes them. He decides to take the Antelope Freeway, and the distance signs to it progress per Zeno's paradox (one mile, 1/2 mile, 1/4 mile, etc.) The infinite series is broken only when he decides to try the "all-weather climate control", and selects "tropical paradise" from a list of options. At the push of a button, this transforms the interior of his car into a tropical rainforest, complete with sounds of exotic birds, thunder, and rainfall.

A troupe of wise-cracking explorers emerge from the trees, including someone who sounds like W. C. Fields, on a half-hearted expedition. Babe tries to escape the interlopers by changing the climate control to "Land of the Pharaohs" and is transported to ancient Egypt, but to no avail; the explorers have come with him. Increasingly annoyed, he complains that the sun is setting and it will be night soon. They reply he's confused, the horizon is moving up; so they stand him on his head to convince him that it is morning. Babe loses his balance and falls to the ground, causing one to remark, "He's no fun! He fell right over!". A loud rumbling is heard, and the group realizes that a pyramid is opening.

The pyramid is actually a motel, with a vacancy. Babe enters the lobby and encounters a pair of partiers. They gradually morph into panoply of characters who launch a satirical celebration of America which parodies Norman Corwin's 1941 patriotic radio pageant We Hold These Truths. This includes sardonic references to slavery and the conquest of the American Indians. At one point, each member of the group rhythmically repeats the names of the candidates in the 1968 presidential election mimicking a steam locomotive: "Rockefeller, Nixon, Humphrey, and Kennedy."

Eventually, Babe is drafted into the army, and the play morphs again into the closing scene of a World War II musical film "Babes In Khaki", starring Lillie Lamont (Proctor). The movie is broadcast on television, and after it ends, channel surfing reveals snippets of random commercials and program segments. At one point we hear a crime drama, with tough guys saying they hate cops. One named Nick declares he's "gonna get even with every rotten cop in this city", by turning in his badge and burning his uniform.

Finally, Spoilsport returns as "Ralph Icebag", selling marijuana instead of cars. His spiel morphs into a close paraphrase of Molly Bloom's Soliloquy which closes James Joyce's novel Ulysses.

=== "The Further Adventures of Nick Danger" ===
This is presented as an episode (titled "Cut 'Em Off at the Past") of a fictional 1940s radio drama, Nick Danger, Third Eye, broadcast on December 7, 1941. Nick Danger (Phil Austin) is a '40s-style hardboiled private investigator in the Raymond Chandler mold. In live performances and photographs, he wears the stereotypical fedora and trench coat. He has the obligatory nemesis on the police force, Lieutenant Bradshaw (Bergman), who questions Danger's every move. His "mark" is Rocky Rococo (Proctor), a Peter Lorre parody. True to the clichés of the genre, there is a suspicious butler, Catherwood (David Ossman), and a femme fatale: Danger's old college flame Betty Jo Bialosky (Proctor, or Bergman in scenes with Rocky Rococo), with aliases Melanie Haber, Audrey Farber, and Susan Underhill, whom "everyone knew as Nancy" (parodying a line from the Beatles' song "Rocky Raccoon").

This sketch is not as surreal or Kafkaesque as most other Firesign Theatre material, though it is intermixed and loaded with references to the Beatles, the I Ching, and other counterculture topics. The basic plot involves the attempt by Rococo to sell Danger a stolen ring, that belonged to Nancy; Danger is thus drawn into a trap and framed when Nancy and Catherwood kill Rococo because he found out about time travel experiments by Catherwood, leading Danger to a violent confrontation with all of them and forcing a confession from Catherwood at gunpoint. It also parodies characteristics of old-time radio drama production, e.g. referring to a fireplace fire as "the cellophane" and "coming in out of the cornstarch" (used to create the sound effects); actors reading the wrong lines, or dropping their scripts; actors stepping out of character to read commercials; and referring to the use of voice fade-outs and organ cues to signal transitions between flashbacks.

At one point, Nancy faints and falls over, causing Danger to say, "She's no fun, she fell right over." He remembers he (Austin) said this same line on side 1 of the record, and asks, "Where am I? I'd better check." The side 1 track is then heard playing backwards, and Danger says, "It's OK, they're speaking Chinese" and continues with the play.

The climax is reached as Catherwood's return from a flashback is bungled, resulting in the duplication of every character except Lieutenant Bradshaw. Just as Danger is about to try something daring to solve this problem and extricate himself from his trap, the action is abruptly interrupted by a special news bulletin, in which President Franklin Delano Roosevelt (Bergman) wearily tells the American people of the attack on Pearl Harbor. He declares our "rendezvous with destiny" demands the United States "unconditionally surrender" to the Empire of Japan. The bulletin ends, but it is too late to find out what Danger did; Bradshaw is congratulating him for solving the case.

The closing organ theme chord segues into Austin laughing and singing "ta-da!", and the Firesign Theatre talk to the producer, announcing their intent to "go back to the other side of the record". The producer then announces, "Scene 3, take 600".

== Issues and reissues ==
This album was originally released on both LP and 8-track tape, and was later released on cassette.

- LP – Columbia CS-9884
- 8 Track – Columbia 18C-09884
- Cassette – PCT-09884

It has been reissued on CD at least 5 times:

- In 1988 by Mobile Fidelity – MFCD-834
- In 1995 by Sony/Legacy – CK-9884
- In 2001 by Sony/Legacy – CK-85774

== Artwork ==
The front cover of the album features photographs of Groucho Marx and John Lennon framed by faux Cyrillic lettering, "ДLL НДІL МДЯЖ LЄИИФИ", parodying Marxism–Leninism. Because of this, the album is sometimes erroneously referred to as All Hail Мarx and Lennon.

The back cover is an overhead shot of the four members looking up at the camera, with Proctor standing on Austin's foot.

Inside the gatefold of the album there are eight posed photos representing various scenes from "The Further Adventures of Nick Danger."

== In popular culture ==
There are several bars in the United States named "Nick Danger's". There is a clothing line called "Nick Danger", as well as a garage band, a porn star, a site about board games (now defunct), and a radio DJ all using the name. "Rocky Rococo" is the name of a pizza-and-pasta restaurant chain based in Wisconsin, and there is a "Betty Jo Byoloski's" (sic) bar and grill in downtown Winona, Minnesota.

The line "He's no fun, he fell right over" is used as a quip in the Mystery Science Theater 3000 episode "Hercules Unchained" for the film Hercules Unchained.
