= Phil Austin =

American comedian and writer (1941–2015)

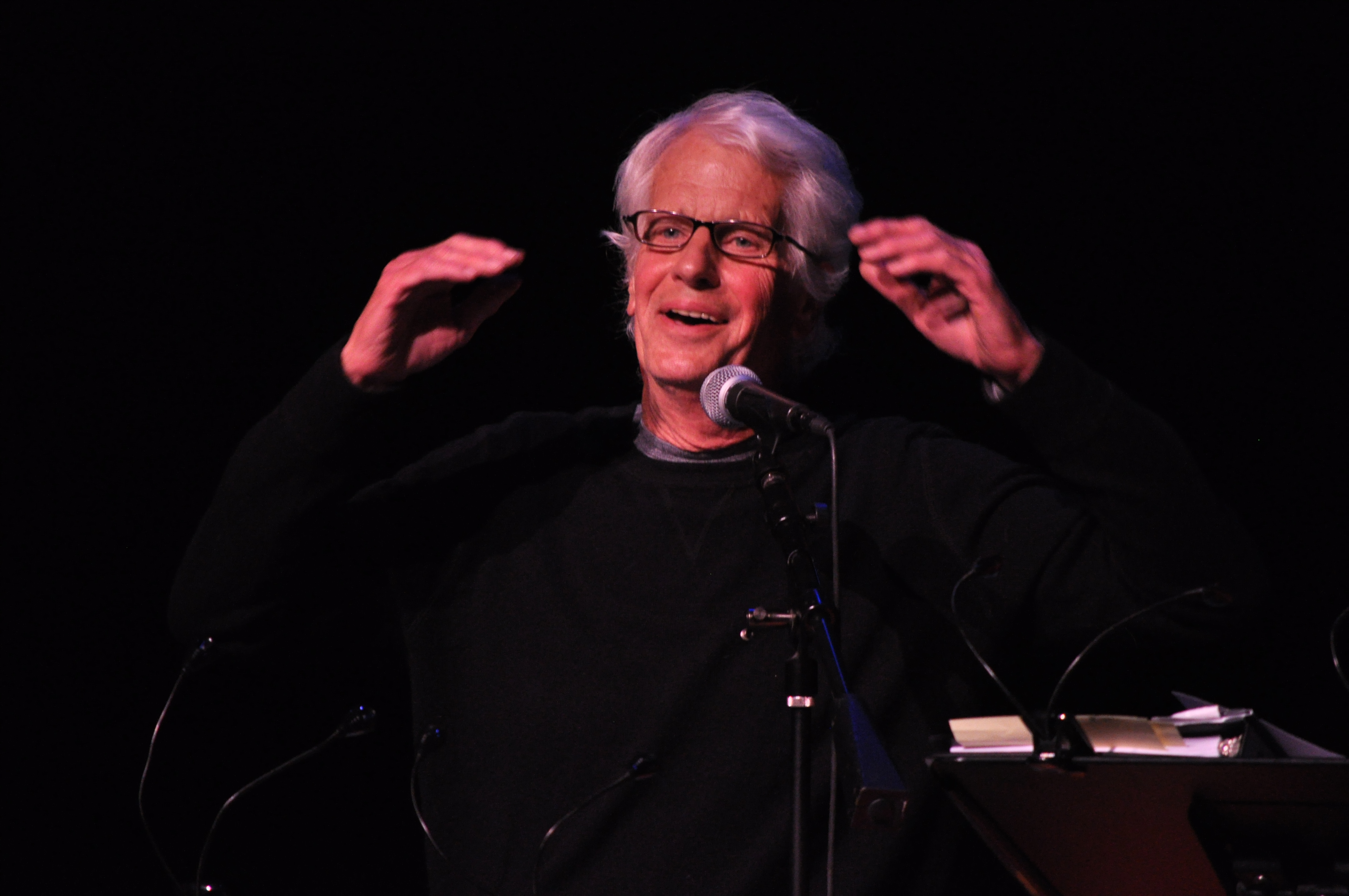
- Born: Philip Baine Austin; April 6, 1941; Denver, Colorado, United States
- Died: June 18, 2015 (aged 74); Fox Island, Washington, United States
- Education: High school
- Occupations: Comedian, writer
- Spouse(s): Annalee Austin, Oona Elliot

Comedy career
- Years active: 1966–2015
- Medium: Radio; recording; film
- Genres: Surreal humor; sketch comedy; word play

Philip Baine Austin (April 6, 1941 – June 18, 2015) was an American comedian and writer, best known as a member of the Firesign Theatre.

== Early life and education ==
Austin was born in Denver, Colorado, and later grew up in Fresno, California, attending Fresno High School. His mother was a drama teacher which influenced his upbringing as an actor. He attended Bowdoin College in Brunswick, Maine, because it was nearly the most distant point in the continental United States from Fresno. He also attended Fresno State College and UCLA, but did not graduate from either of them. He was in the UCLA Drama Department at the same time as another dropout, Ray Manzarek of The Doors.

== Career ==
=== Radio ===
In Los Angeles in the late 1960s, he was one of the first apprentices for the Center Theatre Group and worked on the staff of KPFK radio in Los Angeles. At KPFK he worked with other staffers David Ossman and Peter Bergman who hosted Radio Free Oz on that station. Along with Bergman's friend Phil Proctor, they formed The Firesign Theatre.

Starting as live radio actors, the group would go on to record a series of surrealistic comedy albums that were a hit amongst an underground audience. Austin played the group's best-known creation, private investigator Nick Danger. Other prominent roles were as (Happy) Harry Cox, the narrator of Everything You Know Is Wrong and Bebop Loco/Lobo on Give Me Immortality or Give Me Death. He had also served as the troupe's musician and record producer.

"It was those comments, the off-mic things, that made Phil so funny. He was the most surreal writer of all of us."

— David Ossman

=== Short story writer ===
His collection of short stories, Tales of the Old Detective and Other Big Fat Lies, is published by Audio Editions. Two of his stories appear in the third volume of Mirth of a Nation.

=== Record albums ===
Austin also wrote a solo work, Roller Maidens From Outer Space, and directed (and acted in) Eat Or Be Eaten.

Stage versions of Don't Crush That Dwarf, Hand Me the Pliers; The Further Adventures of Nick Danger, Third Eye; Waiting for the Electrician or Someone Like Him; and Temporarily Humboldt County are published by Broadway Play Publishing Inc.

== Death ==
Austin died at his home in Fox Island, Washington, on June 18, 2015, at the age of 74. The cause of death was originally given as cardiac arrest, but this was later changed to an aneurysm. When he died, his wife Oona mentioned that Austin also had been diagnosed with cancer months before.
