= Don't Crush That Dwarf, Hand Me the Pliers =

Studio album by The Firesign Theatre
- Released: July 22, 1970
- Recorded: April and May 1970
- Genre: Comedy
- Length: 46:28
- Label: Columbia
- Producer: The Firesign Theatre with Bill Driml

The Firesign Theatre chronology
How Can You Be in Two Places at Once When You're Not Anywhere at All (1969)	Don't Crush That Dwarf, Hand Me the Pliers (1970)	I Think We're All Bozos on This Bus (1971)

Professional ratings
Review scores
Source	Rating
AllMusic	5/5 stars
Christgau's Record Guide	A+
The Goldmine Comedy Record Price Guide	2.5/5 stars
The New Rolling Stone Record Guide	5/5 stars

Don't Crush That Dwarf, Hand Me the Pliers is the Firesign Theatre's third comedy album, released by Columbia Records in July 1970. In 1983, The New Rolling Stone Record Guide called it "the greatest comedy album ever made". It was nominated for a Hugo Award for Best Dramatic Presentation in 1971 by the World Science Fiction Society. In 2005, the US Library of Congress added the album to the National Recording Registry and called the Firesign Theatre "the Beatles of comedy."

== Track listing ==
All tracks by The Firesign Theatre

=== Side one ===
1. "This Side" – 22:16

=== Side two ===
1. "The Other Side" – 24:12

== Detailed track information and commentary ==
This was The Firesign Theatre's first album wherein a single theme took up both sides of the album.

In Phil Austin's notes to the 1987 Mobile Fidelity re-release of this album he says "Dwarf is the story of the five ages of Man and in particular, the five ages of one George Leroy Tirebiter; a man named after a dog."

The piece centers on the character of Tirebiter (played by David Ossman), a former child actor who spends his time watching himself on late-night television.

As his evening unfolds, the listener hears "excerpts" from fictional movies in Tirebiter's past. High School Madness stars 'Dave Casman' as Peorgie Tirebiter and 'Joe Bertman' as his sidekick, Mudhead—although an earlier portion of the recording intentionally blurs the distinction between fantasy and reality by identifying Tirebiter (not 'Casman') as having been the star of the "Peorgie and Mudhead" films, rather than a character in those films. High School Madness is a parody of the radio show The Aldrich Family, the Archie comic books, and 1940s and '50s American youth culture in general. In the movie, Peorgie and Mudhead investigate the theft of their high school, Morse Science High, by their rivals, Communist Martyrs High School, on graduation day.

Parallel Hell is a war film set in Korea, where the soldiers (including Tirebiter) debate the seemingly endless war. These are interspersed with commercials and other staples of late-night television (including televangelists and a talk show) as Tirebiter randomly changes channels. The broadcasts contain many references to warfare and Cold War paranoia (product names such as Napalmolive), indicating that Tirebiter's world exists under martial law.

Another satirical comment from the album is the slogan of The Howl of the Wolf Movie: "Presenting honest stories of working people as told by rich Hollywood stars". This is a reference to the 1968 Ingmar Bergman film, "The Hour of the Wolf"

It has been said that the album's title was inspired by a photograph in Bob Dylan's album Blonde on Blonde, where Dylan is holding a small picture of a person and a pair of pliers. It has also been said that the "dwarf" represents a burning "roach" (the final portion of a marijuana cigarette), to "crush" refers to stubbing out the "roach", and "the pliers" refers to a "roach-clip", a device for protecting the fingers while burning a "roach".

The credits on the back cover most likely include pseudonyms (e.g. "Mr. Procmer," presumably a misspelling of Phil Proctor's last name similar to the mention of "Casman" for Ossman and "Bertman" for Bergman on the album) but also include Anna-Lee Austin and Tiny Ossman, then the wives of Phil Austin and David Ossman. Anna-Lee Austin also is credited for the wake-up phone call and bird sound effects heard in the final dialogue segment.

== Personnel ==
The Firesign Theatre:

- Phil Austin
- Peter Bergman
- David Ossman
- Phil Proctor

with:

- Anna-Lee Austin - spoken parts ("Wake-Up Lady and Bird Stylings")
- "Thaddeus Warrick and the Mindermast Mental Music Hall One-Man Sympathy Orchestra"
- "The St. Louis Aquarium Choraleers" (including Anna-Lee Austin, Jane Dansie, Tiny Ossman, Elisabeth Plumb, John Kinick and Cathleen O'Mara)
- "The Android Sisters"
- Production - The Firesign Theatre with Bill Driml
- Production of "Shoes For Industry" (segment early on side two) - James William Guercio
- Cover art - Robert Grossman
- Back cover photos - John Rose, Elisabeth Plumb

== Issues and reissues ==
This album was originally released simultaneously on LP, 8 Track, and Cassette.

- LP – Columbia C-30102
- 8 Track – Columbia 18C-30102
- Cassette – Columbia CT-30102

It has been re-released on CD at least five times:

- 1987 – Mobile Fidelity MFCD-880
- 2001 – Acadia ACA8018
- 2001 – Laugh.com LGH1072
- 2001 (October) – Columbia CK-30102
- 2001 (December) – Sony/Legacy - CK-85775

== Continuity with other Firesign albums ==
George Tirebiter's failed pizza-to-go order is the other half of Nick Danger's conversation from How Can You Be in Two Places at Once When You're Not Anywhere at All, and the album ends with George running outside to buy an ice cream cone from a passing ice cream truck, the chimes thereof opening the next album, I Think We're All Bozos on This Bus.

== Origin of George Tirebiter's name ==
There was a real dog named George Tirebiter.

In 1946, a mongrel whose owner had died wandered onto the campus of the University of Southern California and was adopted by the students as an unofficial mascot. The dog acquired a reputation for chasing cars, hence the name. The dog became so famous that at one point he was kidnapped by rival students from UCLA, who shaved their school's letters into his fur. He was run over and killed by a car in 1950.

In his notes to the Mobile Fidelity release, Austin says that the five ages of George Leroy Tirebiter are:

- Tirebiter the Child, called Peorge or Peorgie
- Tirebiter the College student, called George Tirebiter Camden N200-R
- Tirebiter the Soldier, called Lt. Tirebiter
- Tirebiter the Actor, called Dave Casman
- Tirebiter the Old Man, called George Leroy Tirebiter

== Reception ==
In 1971, Dwarf was nominated for the Hugo Award for Best Dramatic Presentation.

In 2005, Dwarf was added to the National Recording Registry, a list of sound recordings that "are culturally, historically, or aesthetically important, and/or inform or reflect life in the United States."

== Cover art ==
The name "Firesign Theatre" was suggested by an astrologer-friend of the troupe who noted that all four members had been born under "fire signs." The cover art, by Robert Grossman, features caricatures of the members as their respective astrological animals: Austin as a ram (Aries), Proctor as a lion (Leo), and Bergman and Ossman as two Satyrs or Centaurs (Sagittarius). The Sagittarians are armed, respectively, with a bow and suction-cup arrow and a squirt gun, and the other members are seated on their backs. An eponymous pair of pliers sits on the ground beneath them. The original LP release came with a poster, featuring Polaroid snapshots of group members.
