= Peter Bergman (comedian) =

American comedian, founder of The Firesign Theatre troupe

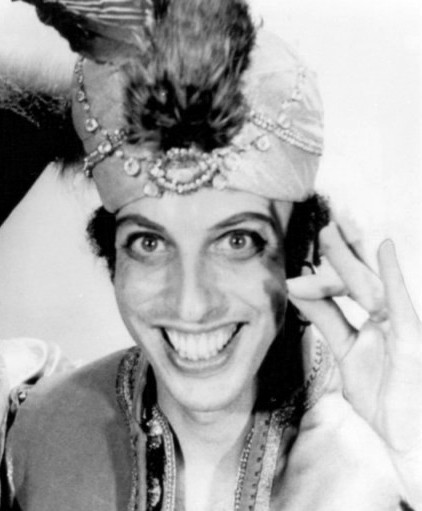
- Bergman in 1973
- Born: Peter Paul Bergman; November 29, 1939; Cleveland, Ohio, U.S.
- Died: March 9, 2012 (aged 72); Santa Monica, California, U.S.
- Education: Yale School of Drama; Yale University
- Occupations: Comedian, actor, writer
- Employer(s): Columbia Records; Rolling Stone; KPFK; KPPC
- Known for: The Firesign Theatre (1966-2012); Coining the word "love-in" (1967); Zachariah (1971); Americathon (1979); Pyst (1996)
- Spouse: Maryedith Burrell
- Children: 1
- Honors: Woodrow Wilson Scholar, Eugene O'Neill Playwriting Fellow at the Yale School of Drama

Peter Paul Bergman (November 29, 1939 – March 9, 2012) was an American comedian and writer, best known as the founder of the Firesign Theatre. He played Lt. Bradshaw in the Nick Danger series.

== Biography ==
Bergman was born in Cleveland, Ohio, and graduated in 1957 from Shaker Heights High School in the Cleveland suburb.

He studied economics at Yale University, where he contributed to the campus humor magazine The Yale Record. He taught economics as a Carnegie Fellow, and also attended the Yale School of Drama as a Eugene O'Neill Playwriting Fellow, and wrote two musicals for the Yale Dramatic Association with Austin Pendleton, where he met acting student Philip Proctor. He was also a Woodrow Wilson Scholar. After college he worked with Tom Stoppard, Derek Marlowe, Piers Paul Read, and Spike Milligan.

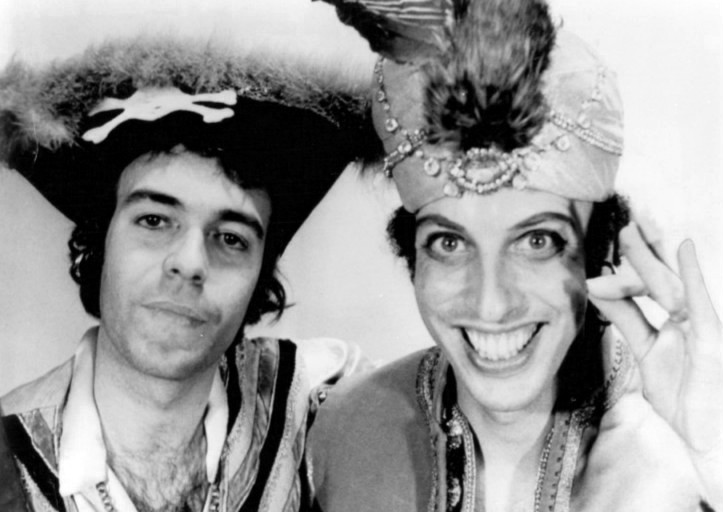
Bergman performed with Philip Proctor (apart from the rest of the Firesign Theatre) in 1973, and at various times through 1990.

The Firesign Theatre was formed as a result of Bergman's show Radio Free Oz on KPFK. According to Bergman, "I started July 24th, 1966 on KPFK ... I had some very interesting people around me, which those folks became the Firesign Theatre: David Ossman was connected with the station, Phil Austin was connected with the station, and Phil Proctor came out to do a show and we connected in LA and that was really the genesis of that whole happening." Bergman also coined the word "love-in" in 1967, and organized the first such event in April 1967 in Los Angeles. He and Proctor witnessed the 1977 Golden Dragon Massacre in San Francisco.

Stage versions of Don't Crush That Dwarf, Hand Me the Pliers, The Further Adventures of Nick Danger, Waiting for the Electrician or Someone Like Him, and "Temporarily Humboldt County" are published by Broadway Play Publishing Inc.

He also was the lead in the 1988 direct to video comedy horror film The Phantom of the Ritz.

== Death ==
Bergman died on March 9, 2012, in Santa Monica, California, at age 72 from complications due to leukemia.
