= David Ossman =

American comic writer, member of The Firesign Theatre troupe

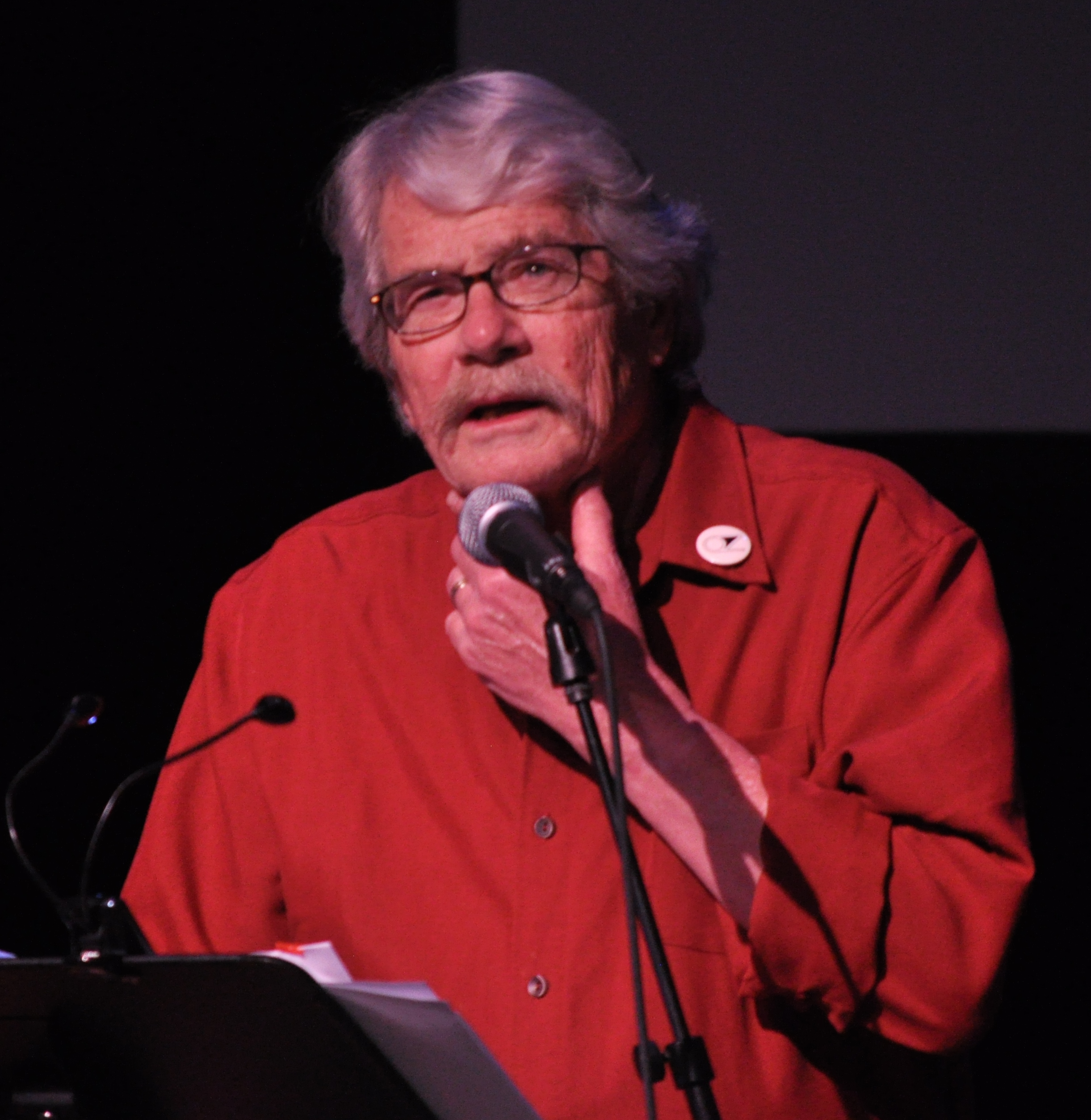
- Ossman in 2012
- Born: December 6, 1936 (age 89); Santa Monica, California, U.S.
- Education: Pomona College; Columbia University
- Occupations: Writer, comedian
- Children: 2

David Ossman (born December 6, 1936) is an American writer and comedian, best known as a member of the Firesign Theatre and screenwriter of such films as Zachariah.

== Early life ==
Ossman attended Pomona College, where he starred in productions including The Crucible and Fumed Oak. He transferred to Columbia University.

== Career ==
Ossman's roles during his Firesign years include George Leroy ("Peorgie") Tirebiter on Don't Crush That Dwarf, Hand Me the Pliers and Catherwood in the "Nick Danger" series.

In 1973, he recorded the solo album How Time Flys. During the 1980s, he left the Firesign Theatre, primarily to produce programs for National Public Radio.

During the 1990s Ossman and his wife Judith Walcutt formed Otherworld Media, through which they produced audio theatre for children, as well as a series of major star-studded audio theatre broadcasts for NPR, including We Hold These Truths (1991), Empire of the Air, War of the Worlds 50th Anniversary Production, Raymond Chandler's Goldfish, and the 100th Anniversary audio theatre adaptation of The Wonderful Wizard of Oz.

His latest Otherworld Media Productions include A Thousand Clowns, Through the Looking Glass, and A Taffetas Christmas. These performances are held at Whidbey Children's Theater on Whidbey Island, a local theatre where children can come to do plays and workshops.

Otherworld Media has also taken on the task of adapting and producing half a dozen screenplays in live radio play format in 2007 and 2008 at the International Mystery Writers Festival in Owensboro, Kentucky. Ossman personally wrote the adaptation and directed the 2007 Angie Award winner Albatross (original screenplay written by Lance Rucker and Timothy Perrin).

Ossman wrote a mystery novel, The Ronald Reagan Murder Case: A George Tirebiter Mystery (published by BearManor Media, 2007). In 2008, Bear Manor Media published his memoir, Dr. Firesign's Follies: Radio, Comedy, Mystery, History. Ossman wrote a second mystery novel, The Flying Saucer Murder Case: A George Tirebiter Mystery (published by BearManor Media, 2024).

Stage versions of Don't Crush That Dwarf, Hand Me the Pliers; The Further Adventures of Nick Danger, Third Eye; and Waiting for the Electrician or Someone Like Him and Temporarily Humboldt County are published by Broadway Play Publishing Inc.

Ossman also wrote a book of poetry in 2009 titled Fools & Death (published by Ion Drive Publishing, 2009).

His Old Cart Wrangler's Saga was a finalist for a 2019 Audie Award (APA- Audiobook Publishers Association) in the Original Works category. It was published by Blackstone Publishing in Ashland, OR.

== Personal life ==
With his first wife, Bettine Kinney, Ossman had two children: a son, Devin, and a daughter, Alizon. With his second wife, Judith Walcutt, he has two sons, Orson and Preston.

On March 19, 2008, Mount Rainier National Park rangers found the body of Ossman's oldest son, Devin, less than two miles from the trailhead where he had parked his car two days earlier for a day hike. His wife had reported him missing the day before.

He currently resides on Whidbey Island with his wife.

Ossman was a member of the Church of the SubGenius.

== Filmography ==
=== Actor ===
- Martian Space Party (1972, Short)
- Everything You Know Is Wrong (1975, LP) – Sheriff Luger Axehandle / NURGI Clockwork Film narrator / Professor Archer / Art Wholeflaffer / Air Force General
- Below the Belt (1980) (voice)
- The Tick (1996, TV Series) – Professor Peelie (voice)
- A Bug's Life (1998) – Cornelius (voice)
- Nowheresville (2000) – Earl Apple
- Firesign Theatre: Weirdly Cool (2001, TV Movie)
- Five Grand (2016) – Abner Wilhelm

=== Writer ===
- Zachariah (1971)
- Martian Space Party (1972)
- Everything You Know Is Wrong (1975)
- Firesign Theatre: Weirdly Cool (2001) (TV)
- The Ronald Reagan Murder Case: A George Tirebiter Mystery (2007)
- Fools & Death (2009)
- Fighting Clowns of Hollywood: With Laffs by the Firesign Theatre (2018)
- The Flying Saucer Murder Case: A George Tirebiter Mystery (2024)

=== Producer ===
- Martian Space Party (1972)
- Everything You Know Is Wrong (1975)

=== Director ===
- Everything You Know Is Wrong (1975)
- Through the Looking Glass (2006)
- Seven Keys to Baldpate (2007)

=== Editor ===
- Martian Space Party (1972)

=== Discography ===
- How Time Flys (1973)
