= Philip Proctor =

American actor

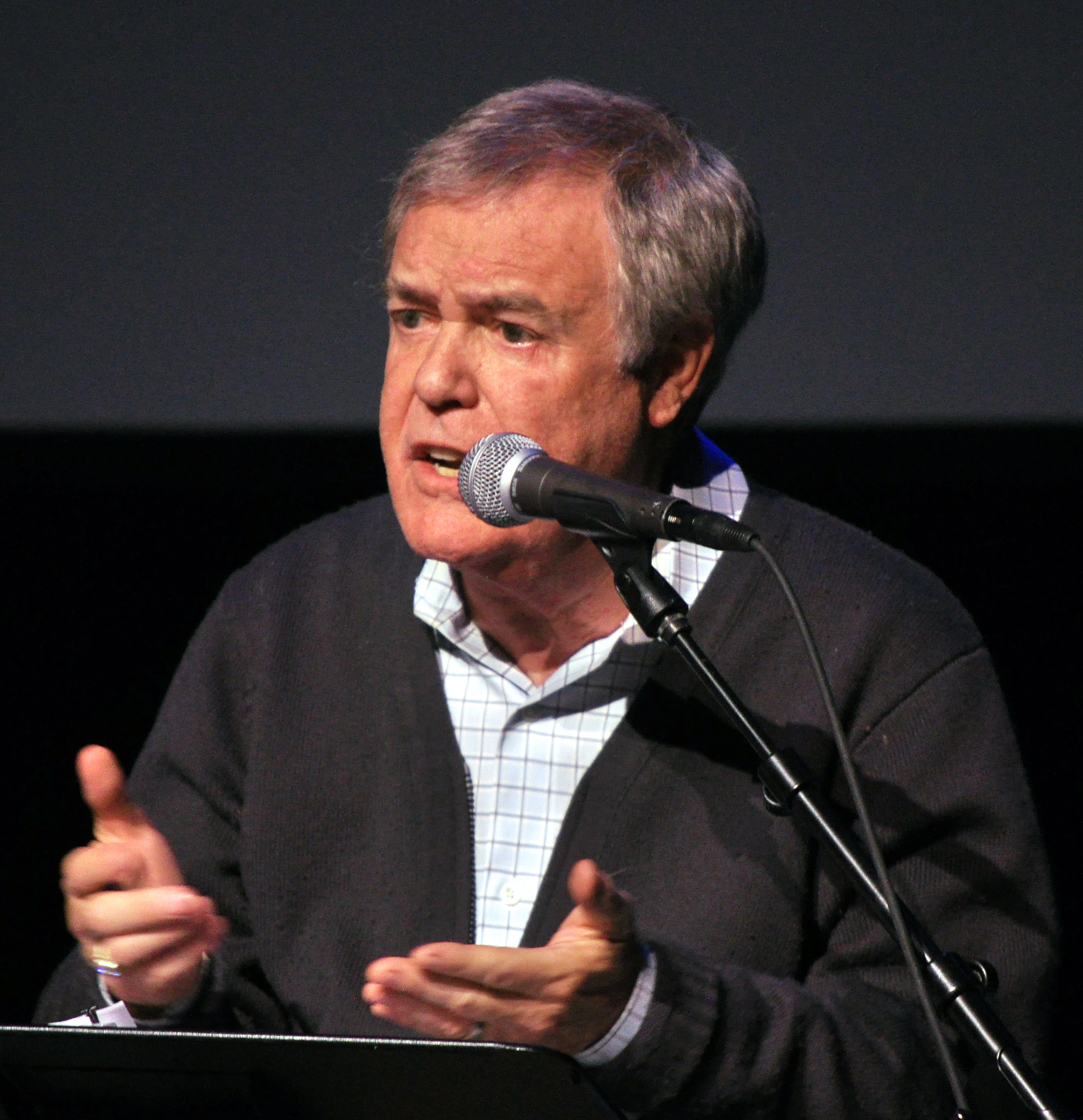
- Proctor in 2012
- Born: Philip George Proctor; July 28, 1940 (age 86); Goshen, Indiana, U.S.
- Other name: Phil Proctor
- Education: Yale University (BA)
- Occupation: Actor
- Years active: 1962–present
- Known for: The Firesign Theatre (1966–2012)
- Spouses: Sheilah Wells (divorced) Barbro Semmingsen (divorced) Melinda Peterson (m. 1992; died 2023)
- Children: Kristin Proctor
- Website: planetproctor.com

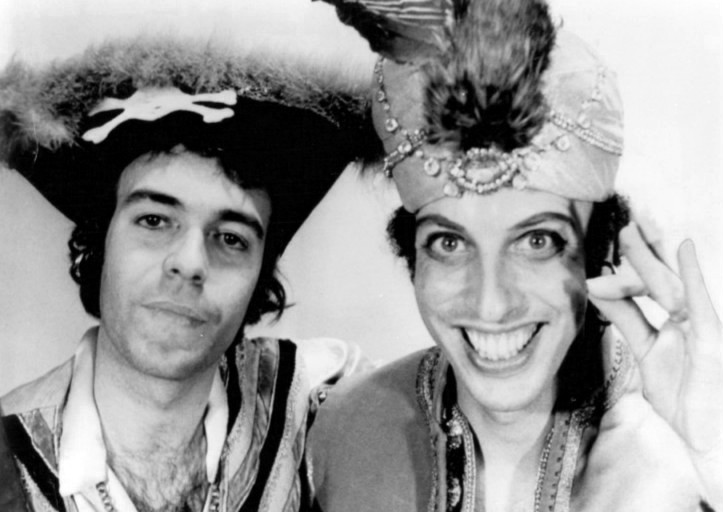
Proctor and Peter Bergman (1976) often performed as a duo without the Firesign Theatre.

Philip George Proctor (born July 28, 1940) is an American actor and a member of the Firesign Theatre. He has performed voice-over work for video games, films and television series.

== Early life ==
Proctor was born in Goshen, Indiana, on July 28, 1940. His great-uncle was Mennonite writer Joseph Yoder. Four years later after his family moved to New York City, he was a child actor working in television. He later earned a drama degree at Yale University.

== Career ==
Proctor won a Theatre World Award for his 1964 performance in The Amorous Flea.

Proctor also appeared occasionally on television in small roles, including episodes of Daniel Boone, All in the Family, and Night Court. He also provided the voices of Pizza Planet Announcer in Toy Story, English Captain in Tarzan, Mr. Konishi in Toy Story 2, Blinko in Treasure Planet, Guard #1 in The Incredibles and Drunk Monkey in the Dr. Dolittle remake series. He has also provided uncredited ADR overdubs for numerous movies over the years. More recently, he has done voices for several cartoons and video games, including the voice of Howard DeVille in Rugrats and All Grown Up! on Nickelodeon, "background" voices for Disney features, and voice work on Power Rangers Time Force. He also did two voices in the GameCube video game Eternal Darkness: Sanity's Requiem. He is the voice of The Professor and White Monkey in the Ape Escape series. Recently, his voice was featured in the video game Dead Rising as Russell Barnaby, in the Assassin's Creed series as Dr. Warren Vidic, and on Adventures in Odyssey as Leonard Meltsner and Detective Don Polehaus. In the 2007 live audio production of the Angie Award-winning screenplay Albatross (original screenplay written by Lance Rucker and Timothy Perrin) at the International Mystery Writers Festival, he played seven characters requiring four different accents: KGB agent Stefan Linnik, East German Communist Party apparatchik Kurt Mueller; a West Berlin gasthaus owner; an armed forces radio announcer; the Senate minority whip; a Secret Service guard; and Gerhard Derstman, the East German Cultural Attache/Stasi member. He also lent his voice to the game Battlezone. He was the announcer on Big Brother in seasons 3 through 6. Proctor also lent his voice in the Marvel: Ultimate Alliance series as the voices of Edwin Jarvis and Baron Mordo in the first game, and the Tinkerer (Marvel Comics)Tinkerer in the sequel, Marvel: Ultimate Alliance 2. He currently serves among the repertory cast of featured voices in recent and current Disney animated films. Proctor is a company member of the Antaeus Theatre Company in Los Angeles.

Stage versions of the records Don't Crush That Dwarf, Hand Me the Pliers; The Further Adventures of Nick Danger, Third Eye; and Waiting for the Electrician or Someone Like Him and Temporarily Humboldt County are published Broadway Play Publishing Inc.

In 2017, Proctor published an autobiography entitled Where's My Fortune Cookie? coauthored with Brad Schreiber.

In recent years Proctor has performed on the radio program American Parlor Songbook in sketches called "Boomers on a Bench".

== Personal life ==
Proctor was married to actress Sheilah Wells and Norwegian television producer Barbro Semmingsen. He was married to Melinda Peterson from 1992 until her death in 2023. His daughter with Semmingsen, Kristin, is also an actress.

== Filmography ==
=== Film ===
Year	Title	Role	Notes
1969	The Thousand Plane Raid	Turret Gunner	
1971	A Safe Place	Fred	
1976	Tunnel Vision	Christian Broder	
1977	Cracking Up	Walter Concrete	
1979	J-Men Forever	Barton	
1984	Sam's Son	Art Fisher	
1987	Amazon Women on the Moon	Mike	Segment: "Silly Pate"
1989	Lobster Man from Mars	Lou	
1989	Night Life	Randolph Whitlock	
1991	Beauty and the Beast	Dick (voice)	
1995	Toy Story	Pizza Planet Guard, Pizza Planet Announcer (voice)	
1998	Dr. Dolittle	Drunken Monkey (voice)	
1998	The Rugrats Movie	Howard DeVille, Igor (voice)	
1998	A Bug's Life	Slick, Fly in Circus, Grasshopper Lying Down (voice)	
1999	Tarzan	English Captain, Scared Elephant (voice)	
1999	Toy Story 2	Airline Rep, Sign-Off Announcer, Mr. Konishi (voice)	
2000	The Independent	Rob's Father	
2000	The Adventures of Rocky and Bullwinkle	RBTV Floor Director	
2000	Rugrats in Paris: The Movie	Howard DeVille (voice)	
2000	Recess: School's Out	Golfer, Scientist (voice)	
2001	Dr. Dolittle 2	Drunken Monkey (voice)	
2001	Spirited Away	Frog-like Chef (voice)	English dub
2001	Monsters, Inc.	Charlie (voice)	
2002	Asterix & Obelix: Mission Cleopatra	Getafix (voice)	English dub
2002	Treasure Planet	Blinko (voice)	
2003	Rugrats Go Wild	Howard DeVille (voice)	
2003	Brother Bear	Inuit Tribesmen (voice)	
2004	Home on the Range	Man on Train (voice)	
2004	The Incredibles	Guard (voice)	
2005	Thru the Moebius Strip	Rebel (voice)	English dub
2006	Hollywood Dreams	Theater Director	
2006	Dr. Dolittle 3	Drunken Monkey, Stray Dog (voice)	
2007	Happily N'Ever After	Amigo #1 (voice)	
2007	Dr. Dolittle: Tail to the Chief	Drunken Monkey (voice)	
2008	Fly Me to the Moon	Senior Official (voice)	
2009	Dr. Dolittle: Million Dollar Mutts	Drunken Monkey (voice)	
2012	Koala Kid	Lug (voice)	English dub
2012	The Reef 2: High Tide	Moe (voice)	English dub
2018	The Last Prince of Atlantis	Police Chief (voice)	

=== Television ===
Year	Title	Role	Notes
1987	Pound Puppies	Rusty (voice)	Episode: "Where Do Puppies Come From?"
1991–93	Taz-Mania	Chief Bushrat, additional voices	10 episodes
1991–2004	Rugrats	Howard DeVille, additional voices	48 episodes
1992	The Golden Girls	Ron	Episode: Goodbye, Mr. Gordon
1992	The Golden Palace	Vincent Vale	Episode: Just a Gigolo
1994–96	The Tick	Charles' Father, Cordoroy Cordoba, additional voices	9 episodes
1997	Spider-Man: The Animated Series	Rheinholdt Kragov / Electro (voice)	3 episodes
1999	Big Brother	Announcer (voice)	Seasons 3–5
2000	The Wild Thornberrys	Game Host, Bodybuilder (voice)	Episode: "A Tiger by the Tail"
2001	Power Rangers Time Force	Miracon (voice)	Episode: "Reflections of Evil"
2002	Justice League	First Humanoid (voice)	Episode: "War World"
2003–08	All Grown Up!	Howard DeVille, additional voices	11 episodes
2005	Arrested Development	Bob Patterson	Episode: "Notapusy"
2007	Avatar: The Last Airbender	Music Teacher (voice)	Episode: "The Headband"

=== Video games ===
Year	Title	Role	Notes
1982	Bomb Squad	Frank	
1982	B-17 Bomber	Pilot	
1996	Lighthouse: The Dark Being	Jeremiah Krick	
1998	Battlezone	George Collins, Russian Pilot	
1999	Star Wars: X-Wing Alliance	Tomaas Azzameen, Imperial Officers, Rebel Pilot	
1999	Indiana Jones and the Infernal Machine	Soviet Soldiers	
2000	Star Trek: Klingon Academy	Civil War Helm Officer, Tako, Commander Roq	
2001	Star Wars: Galactic Battlegrounds	Viceroy Nute Gunray	
2002	La Pucelle: Tactics	Father Salade	
2002	Blood Omen 2	Faustus	
2002	Eternal Darkness	Roberto Bianchi, Bishop	
2003	Indiana Jones and the Emperor's Tomb	Russian Ivory Hunter	
2003	SOCOM II U.S. Navy SEALs	Arjan Manjani	
2003	Final Fantasy X-2	Donga	
2004	Syphon Filter: The Omega Strain	Proust, ALA B, Pulikovsky, CDP Soldier, Samaev	
2005	Ape Escape: On the Loose	Professor	
2005	Area 51	Mr. White	
2005	From Russia with Love	Q	
2005	Ape Escape 3	Professor, Ukki White	
2006	Metal Gear Acid 2	Chaigidiel	
2006	Dead Rising	Russell Barnaby	
2006	Syphon Filter: Dark Mirror	Viktor Yavlinsky	
2006	Marvel: Ultimate Alliance	Edwin Jarvis, Baron Mordo	
2006	Blue Dragon	Fushira	
2007	Assassin's Creed	Warren Vidic	
2009	Marvel: Ultimate Alliance 2	Tinkerer, Magneto	
2009	The Saboteur	Kessler	
2011	The Lord of the Rings: War in the North	Radagast	
2012	Darksiders II	Lord of Bones	
2015	Batman: Arkham Knight	Simon Stagg	
