= LRC (file format) =

File format

- Filename extension: .lrc
- Magic number: None, formally
- Developed by: None
- Type of format: Timed text
- Container for: Song lyrics (with their timings in the song)
- Open format?: Yes
- Free format?: Yes

LRC (short for lyrics) is a computer file format that synchronizes song lyrics with an audio file, such as MP3, AAC, or MIDI. It allows for compatible media player software (including digital audio players) to display song lyrics synchronously with a playing song. The lyrics file has the same name as the audio file, just with a different filename extension, and operates as a sidecar file. For example, if a song's main file is song.mp3, its LRC file would be song.lrc. The LRC format is text-based and similar in form to subtitle files. It can be manually created and written in a text editor but purpose-made software has been made to ease and automate the creation of lyrics files. Various websites operate providing ready-made LRC files for songs to be downloaded. There also exist software that mass-download LRC files from song lyrics databases, automating the process to the user.

== File format ==
=== Core format ===
The original LRC format (sometimes called the Simple LRC format) is formed of two types of tags (time tags and optional ID tags), with one tag per line. Time tags have the format [mm:ss.xx]lyric , where mm is minutes, ss is seconds, xx is hundredths of a second, and lyric is the lyric to be played at that time. A basic example with just time tags is below.

[00:12.00]Line 1 lyrics
[00:17.20]Line 2 lyrics

[00:21.10][00:45.10]Repeating lyrics (e.g. chorus)
...
[mm:ss.xx]Last lyrics line

ID tags may optionally appear before the lyrics, although some players may not recognize or simply ignore this. The format of an ID tag is [type:value], where type is the tag type and value its value (most often some text). The different possible tag types are tabulated below.

Tag type	Tag purpose
ti	Title of the song
ar	Artist performing the song
al	Album the song is from
au	Author of the song
lr	Lyricist of the song
length	Length of the song (mm:ss)
by	Author of the LRC file (not the song)
offset	Specifies a global offset value for the lyric times, in milliseconds. The value is prefixed with either + or -, with + causing lyrics to appear sooner
re/tool	The player or editor that created the LRC file
ve	The version of the program
#	Comments

A more comprehensive example with both ID and time tags is given below.

[ar:Chubby Checker oppure  Beatles, The]
[al:Hits Of The 60's - Vol. 2 – Oldies]
[ti:Let's Twist Again]
[au:Written by Kal Mann / Dave Appell, 1961]
[length: 2:23]

[00:12.00]Naku Penda Piya-Naku Taka Piya-Mpenziwe
[00:15.30]Some more lyrics ...
...

=== Extensions ===
Several extensions to the format have been created to introduce new functionality.

==== Walaoke extension ====
The Walaoke extension, available only in Walaoke from Walasoft, allows the specification of parts for a male-female duet. This is done through the use of M: , F: , and D: at the start of a line for male, female, and duet lines respectively. This allows them to be displayed in different colours. This is illustrated with an example below.

[00:12.00]Line 1 lyrics
[00:17.20]F: Line 2 lyrics
[00:21.10]M: Line 3 lyrics
[00:24.00]Line 4 lyrics
[00:28.25]D: Line 5 lyrics
[00:29.02]Line 6 lyrics

Using blue for male, red for female, and pink for duet, the lines will have the following colours:

1. Line 1 will use the default color (blue), as there is no gender specifier;
2. Line 2 will use red;
3. Line 3 will use blue;
4. Line 4 will continue to use blue, as no change has been specified;
5. Line 5 will use pink; and
6. Line 6 will continue to use pink.

==== A2 extension (Enhanced LRC format) ====
The A2 extension to the LRC format (also called the Enhanced LRC format) was introduced by the A2 Media Player, and adds the ability to specify the time individual words are sung. These word time tags are identical to the standard line time tags, but use angle brackets instead of square ones (i.e. <mm:ss.xx>). This allows the player to highlight each word when it needs to be sung, for example. An example is given below.

[ti: Somebody to Love]
[ar: Jefferson Airplane]
[al: Surrealistic Pillow]
[lr: Lyricists of that song]
[length: 2:58]

[00:00.00] <00:00.04> When <00:00.16> the <00:00.82> truth <00:01.29> is <00:01.63> found <00:03.09> to <00:03.37> be <00:05.92> lies 
[00:06.47] <00:07.67> And <00:07.94> all <00:08.36> the <00:08.63> joy <00:10.28> within <00:10.53> you <00:13.09> dies 
[00:13.34] <00:14.32> Don't <00:14.73> you <00:15.14> want <00:15.57> somebody <00:16.09> to <00:16.46> love

== Software and support ==
LRC was first introduced by Taiwan-based Kuo (Djohan) Shiang-shiang's Lyrics Displayer in 1998, with an accompanying plug-in for Winamp. Over the years many devices and software started supporting the LRC format, including:

- Portable media players, various models such as Meizu's M3 Music Card and M6 Mini Player, Creative Labs' MuVo V100, Archos 5, various Sony Walkman players, Transcend's MP330, TEAC MP-222, and Rockbox compatible devices
- Smartphones using built-in music players such as those of Huawei, Samsung, Oppo, Realme, Vivo and Xiaomi, as well as Nokia's older Symbian devices like the 5800 XpressMusic
- Other handheld devices such as the Caanoo and GP2X Wiz game consoles and the Sony Tablet S using its embedded player
- Non-portable home devices such as Cocktail Audio X40, X50

Below is a table of various LRC software available for PCs or smartphones that may support playing music using LRC, that can create and edit LRC files, and that can search and download LRC data:

Software	Lyrics Display	LRC Editor	LRC Search and Download	LRC Database
PyLrcGet (Python alternative of LRCGET with enhanced features)	Yes	Yes	Yes	Yes
LRCGET (Utility for mass-downloading LRC lyrics)	Yes	Yes	Yes	Yes
Foobar2000 (with OpenLyrics component)	Yes	Yes	Yes	
Karaoke Lyric Editor (free cross-platform lyrics editor and exporter for Karaoke formats)	Yes	Yes		
Musicolet Music Player for Android (supports Creating and Viewing synchronized lyrics in LRC format)	Yes	Yes		
LyricsX (open-source, macOS App Store approved application to view lyrics on screen and/or Touch Bar of MacBooks) (App Store link) (GitHub link)	Yes		Yes	
AutoLyric (plugin for some Windows media players)	Yes		Yes	
LRCMakerPro for Android Devices	Yes		Yes	
Vanilla Music (with Lyrics search plugin)	Yes		Yes	
Tauon Music Box (for Linux, Windows and macOS)	Yes	Yes	Yes	
OSD Lyrics (for Linux)	Yes		Yes	
Kodi (up to v15) / Boxee	Yes		Yes	
MusicBee (with plugin)	Yes		Yes	
Jellyfin (since v10.9.0)	Yes		Yes	
LRC Maker (online simple and enhanced LRC maker/editor)	No	Yes		
Akari's LRC Maker (open-source online simple LRC maker/editor) (GitHub link)	No	Yes		
LrcGenerator (online simple LRC maker/editor with a lot of advertising)	No	Yes		
LRC-Lyricist	No	Yes		
Lyric Potato (AI tool for automatically generating timed text transcriptions)	No	Yes		No
KaraFun Player (a third-party application that can visualise both simple and enhanced lrc files)	Yes			
LineSpec displays lyrics in combination with a few media players	Yes			
YouTube Movie Maker (can make lyric videos)	Yes			
Lyrimer	Yes			
Neutron Player for Android Mobile Devices	Yes			
AIMP	Yes			
Retro Music Player (offline music player for Android)	Yes			
Medoly (for Android, also supports Enhanced LRC formats and other lyric formats)	Yes			
OneStagePlayer	Yes			
mpv	Yes			
Lyrics Jukebox	Yes			
SubtitleEdit				
Poweramp (for Android)	Yes			
KMPlayer	Yes			
lrcShow-X (free software for X Window System, uses D-Bus to communicate with audio player)	Yes			
StepMania	Yes			
Plex (software)	Yes			
Winamp (using Winamp Lyrics plugin)	Yes			
Windows Media Player Legacy (using Lyrics Plugin)	Yes			
Elisa (part of the KDE project)	Yes			
QuickLRC ( AI LRC Maker/Generator)	Yes	Yes		
fooyin	Yes	Yes	Yes	Yes

== See also ==
- Karaoke and *.kar files.
- CD+G
- MP3+G
- Timed text
