= Matt Wickline =

American writer and director (born 1962)

- Born: April 28, 1962 (age 64); Mentor, Ohio, U.S.
- Education: Ohio University
- Occupations: Writer, director
- Years active: 1983–present
- Spouse: Marcy Hardart (m. 1996)
- Children: 3, including Jane

Matthew John Wickline (born April 28, 1962) is an American television writer, producer, director, and actor known for being a longtime member of the writing staff for Late Night With David Letterman. He wrote on In Living Color, where he created the hit character Homey D. Clown, portrayed by Damon Wayans. He went on to write for Martin, The Jamie Foxx Show, and co-create The Hughleys and Frank TV.

Throughout his career, Wickline was nominated for 11 Emmys and won four.

== Early life ==
Matt Wickline grew up in Willowick, Ohio as one of four brothers and the son to William and Elva Wickline. William was the President of the US division of the television antenna company Kathrein. Matt Wickline attended Eastlake North High School and Ohio University.

== Career ==
After college, he interned at Late Night with David Letterman and started submitting jokes to David Letterman at the suggestion of his boss. When several of the show's writers left in 1983 to write for The New Show, Wickline joined Late Night's writing staff, serving as a member for what critics would call the program's "creative peak." He stayed in his position for seven years, occasionally acting in bit parts on the show.

Wickline quickly became writing partners and best friends with Chris Elliott, another staff member who was promoted to writer in 1983 and one of the only non-Harvard alum writers on the show at the time. Wickline and Elliott co-wrote all of Elliott's early character bits on the show, including his series of "Guy" characters, The Guy Under The Seats, The Fugitive Guy, The Panicky Guy, The Conspiracy Guy, and The Regulator Guy.

Wickline and Elliott pitched Late Night's first theme show, an Emmy-winning hour-long interactive episode called "The Custom-Made Show, leading the program to do a series of ambitious experimental one-off episodes. Wickline pitched two notable theme shows that were developed but never made it to air: an episode entirely in Claymation that the network deemed too expensive and the first talk show filmed underwater, which Letterman canceled due to neck pain after a run-through with a scuba diver in a pool in New Jersey. While at Late Night, Wickline, Elliott, and fellow writer Sandy Frank worked on nights and weekends to write Elliott's critically-acclaimed Cinemax Comedy Experiment TV specials FDR: A One-Man Show and Action Family together, with Wickline making his directorial debut on the former. While at the show, Wickline and Elliott had a falling-out and ceased working together. Elliott switched to collaborating with another writer, Adam Resnick, on his character bits on the show and subsequent projects.

Wickline departed Late Night in 1990, amidst a major turnover in the show's writing roster, to join the original staff of In Living Color. Along with longtime Late Night writer Joe Toplyn, he joined In Living Color following its pilot episode. At the show, Wickline created Damon Wayans's breakout character Homey D. Clown, based on Paul Mooney's behavior in the writer's room. Homey D. Clown was one of the series' most famous characters, and even spawned his own video game and a planned feature film starring Wayans that was shut down by its studio Fox in the early 2000s just two days before filming was set to begin. Along with many members of the writing staff, Wickline left the show after the first season, though he would return to direct sketches in season two. He joined Martin Lawrence's Fox sitcom Martin as a writer and co-executive producer, hired by his In Living Color collaborator, Martin creator John Bowman. In 1995, Wickline and Frank co-created the short-lived Comedy Central medical drama spoof The Clinic, in which they cast Adam West as the lead after being fans of the cult classic pilot Lookwell. Wickline then co-created The Show, a sitcom focused on the only white writer on a black TV sketch show and based on Wickline and co-creator John Bowman's time at In Living Color and Martin. After the demise of those series, he wrote for The Jamie Foxx Show for a season.

In 1998, Wickline and D.L. Hughley co-created the sitcom The Hughleys as a starring vehicle for the comedian. The series ran for four seasons and 89 episodes on ABC and UPN. Next, Wickline developed sitcoms that didn't make it to air at NBC and The WB centered on standups Joe Matarese and Cedric the Entertainer before reuniting with frequent collaborator John Bowman to co-create two TV sketch shows that did make it to air alongside their comedian-stars: Cedric the Entertainer Presents with Cedric the Entertainer and Frank TV with Frank Caliendo.

== Filmography ==
| Year | Title | Creator | Director | Showrunner | Writer | Executive Producer | Notes |
|---|---|---|---|---|---|---|---|
| 1983-1990 | Late Night with David Letterman | No | No | No | Yes | No | |
| 1987 | Action Family | No | No | —N/a | Yes | No | TV special; Co-written with Chris Elliott and Sandy Frank |
| 1987 | FDR: A One-Man Show | No | Yes | —N/a | Yes | No | TV special; Co-written with Chris Elliott and Sandy Frank |
| 1990-1993 | In Living Color | No | Yes | No | Yes | No | |
| 1991 | Good Sports | No | No | No | Yes | No | |
| 1993 | Homey D. Clown | No | No | —N/a | Character Homey D. Clown created by | No | Video game |
| 1993-1995 | Martin | No | No | No | Yes | Co-executive producer | |
| 1995 | The Clinic | Yes | No | Yes | Yes | Yes | Co-created with Sandy Frank and Mark Drop |
| 1996 | The Show | Developer | No | Yes | Yes | Co-executive producer | Co-created with John Bowman |
| 1996-1997 | The Jamie Foxx Show | No | No | No | Yes | No | |
| 1998 | Blasto | No | No | —N/a | Yes | No | Video game |
| 1998-2002 | The Hughleys | Yes | Yes | Yes | Yes | Yes | Co-created with D.L. Hughley |
| 2001 | Cedric the Coach | Yes | No | Yes | Yes | Yes | TV pilot; Co-created with John Bowman |
| 2002-03 | Cedric the Entertainer Presents | Yes | No | Yes | Yes | Yes | Co-created with Cedric the Entertainer and John Bowman |
| 2005 | Barbershop | No | Yes | No | No | Co-executive producer | |
| 2007-2008 | Frank TV | Yes | Yes | Yes | Yes | Yes | Co-created with Frank Caliendo and John Bowman |
| 2010-2013 | Pair of Kings | No | No | Yes | Yes | Yes | |
| 2013 | The Garcias Have Landed | No | Yes | No | No | No | TV pilot |

== Personal life ==
On February 17th, 1996, Wickline married Marcy Hardart, great-granddaughter of the legendary restaurant Horn & Hardart who had previously worked as a manager of new business development at MTV and as an assistant to Lorne Michaels at Saturday Night Live from 1987 to 1990. They have three children together, including SNL cast member Jane Wickline.

== Awards ==
As a writer for Late Night, Wickline and the rest of the writing staff won four Emmy Awards for Outstanding Writing in a Variety or Music Program in 1984, 1985, 1986, and 1987, a four-year sweep. He was nominated for an additional seven Emmys for his work on Late Night and In Living Color, nominated for three Emmys in the same category in 1985 and two in the same category in 1990.

=== Primetime Emmy Awards ===
| Year | Category | Nominated work | Result | Episode | Ref. |
|---|---|---|---|---|---|
| 1984 | Outstanding Writing in a Variety Or Music Program | Late Night with David Letterman | Won | "Show #291" | |
| 1984 | Outstanding Writing in a Variety Or Music Program | Late Night with David Letterman | Nominated | "Show #312" | |
| 1985 | Outstanding Writing in a Variety Or Music Program | Late Night with David Letterman | Won | "Christmas with the Lettermans" | |
| 1985 | Outstanding Writing in a Variety Or Music Program | Late Night with David Letterman | Nominated | "Late Night in Los Angeles" | |
| 1985 | Outstanding Writing in a Variety Or Music Program | Late Night with David Letterman | Nominated | "The Late Night Morning Show" | |
| 1986 | Outstanding Writing in a Variety Or Music Program | Late Night with David Letterman | Won | "4th Anniversary Special" | |
| 1987 | Outstanding Writing in a Variety Or Music Program | Late Night with David Letterman | Won | "5th Anniversary Special" | |
| 1988 | Outstanding Writing in a Variety Or Music Program | Late Night with David Letterman | Nominated | "6th Anniversary Special" | |
| 1989 | Outstanding Writing in a Variety Or Music Program | Late Night with David Letterman | Nominated | "7th Anniversary Special" | |
| 1990 | Outstanding Writing in a Variety Or Music Program | Late Night with David Letterman | Nominated | "8th Anniversary Special | |
| 1990 | Outstanding Writing in a Variety Or Music Program | In Living Color | Nominated | "Pilot" | |
