= Freddy Lockhart =

American actor

- Born: Frederick Douglas Lockhart; July 18, 1979 (age 46); San Antonio, Texas, U.S.
- Occupations: Comedian; actor; podcaster

Frederick Douglas "Freddy" Lockhart (born July 18, 1979) is an American comedian, actor, writer, and producer. In 2006 he became known for his popular internet series on Superdeluxe known as Mixed Media, and in 2008 was cast alongside Frank Caliendo on the TBS series Frank TV.

== Early life ==
Lockhart was born in San Antonio. His father, Frederick Douglas Lockhart Jr., of African American ancestry, was a surgical assistant in the United States Air Force. His mother, Nancy Blake Lockhart Mullins, who is of Italian and English ancestry, was a student at the University of Texas at San Antonio. Lockhart later moved to Edwards Air Force Base in California, where he attended Bailey Elementary School. In 1986, his family then moved to Arizona where he spent his formative years being influenced by Eddie Murphy, Richard Pryor, Lenny Bruce and Bill Cosby.

== Career ==
After graduating from Corona del Sol High School, Lockhart moved to Hollywood to begin performing at the Comedy Store. In 2004, he made his national television debut on Jimmy Kimmel Live! After that he worked regularly in film and television. He tours all over the world and can be seen in both Los Angeles and New York when he is not touring. He also hosts his own podcast on The Toad Hop Network called What's Good.

== Filmography ==
=== Film ===
Year	Title	Role	Notes
2013	Dealin' with Idiots	Umpire #2	

=== Television ===
Year	Title	Role	Notes
2008	Frank TV	Various roles	Episode: "Frank of America"
2009	Popzilla	Various roles	Television series
2010	Glenn Martin, DDS	Voice	Episode: "Hail to the Teeth"
2021	Living Wage	Morgan	2 episodes
