= Zatar =

Zatar may refer to:

- the Middle Eastern spice mixture Za'atar
- Zatar, a character on Weird TV, also known as the Mutant King
- Ayed Zatar (born 1996), Paraguayan tennis player
