= Dealin' with Idiots =

- Theatrical release poster
- Directed by: Jeff Garlin
- Written by: Jeff Garlin
- Produced by: Christine Vachon; Erin O'Malley
- Starring: Jeff Garlin; Fred Willard; Bob Odenkirk; J. B. Smoove; Timothy Olyphant; Richard Kind; Nia Vardalos; Jami Gertz; Steve Agee; Gina Gershon
- Cinematography: James Laxton
- Edited by: Jonathan Corn; Nena Hsu Erb
- Music by: Larry Goldings
- Production company: Killer Films
- Distributed by: IFC Films
- Release date: July 12, 2013
- Country: United States
- Language: English
- Box office: $16,757

Dealin' with Idiots is a 2013 American film written and directed by Jeff Garlin, who also stars. It was distributed by IFC Films and released on July 12, 2013.

== Synopsis ==
According to a press release from IFC Films, the film's distributor, Dealin' with Idiots is about Max Morris, a famous comedian, who decides to get to know the colorful parents and coaches of his son's Little League Baseball team in an attempt to find the inspiration for his next movie.

== Cast ==
- Jeff Garlin as Max Morris, a famous comedian
- Max Wright as Jack Morris
- Mindy Rickles as Shelley
- Dave Sheridan as Forrest
- Hope Dworaczyk as Angela
- Kerri Kenney-Silver as Caitlin
- Steve Agee as Hezekiah
- Fred Willard as Marty
- Alex Puccinelli as Ambrose
- Bob Odenkirk as Coach Jimbo
- J. B. Smoove as Coach Ted
- Jami Gertz as Rosie
- Gina Gershon as Sophie
- Timothy Olyphant as Max's Dad
- Richard Kind as Harold
- Nia Vardalos as Ava Morris
- Ian Gomez as Commissioner Gordon
- Ali Wong as Katie
- Xolo Maridueña as Manny
- Chris Williams as Bengal Bob
- Deanna Brooks as Jackie the Chocolatier
- Natasha Leggero as Tipsy Jessica
- Ian Roberts as Freddy
- Luenell as Big Time Sara
- Bobby Dekeyser as Hans
- Hiromi Oshima as Andrea
- Freddy Lockhart as Umpire #2
- Sarayu Rao as Opposing Team Parent

== Production ==
Dealin' with Idiots was written and directed by Garlin, inspired by his experiences with his son's youth baseball team.

== Reception ==
On the review aggregator website Rotten Tomatoes, 33% of 18 critics' reviews are positive.
