= Action Family =

- Action Family title card
- Also known as: Cinemax Comedy Experiment: Action Family
- Genre: Comedy/Drama
- Created by: Chris Elliott
- Written by: Chris Elliott; Sanford Jay Frank; Matt Wickline
- Directed by: Gary Weis
- Starring: Chris Elliott
- Theme music composer: Ron Artis
- Composer: Martin Thomas
- Country of origin: United States
- Original language: English

Production
- Executive producer: Rick Newman
- Producer: Michael J. Hill
- Running time: 29 minutes

Original release
- Network: Cinemax
- Release: February 7, 1987

Action Family is an episode of Cinemax Comedy Experiment anthology series written by and starring Chris Elliott as a Private Investigator named Chris Elliot who is juggling work and home life. The show's overarching theme is that it is in fact two shows in one, and has sudden dramatic tonal shifts that affect everything from the way the characters act to the type of cameras used. His home and family life are a parody of a late 1970s/early 1980s saccharine multicamera sitcom shot on cheap 3 walled sets with an audience that often loudly comments on the action. When he goes to work as a hard boiled PI, the show switches tones entirely to dark, gritty, and violent, the camera switches to film stock, and the audience laughter vanishes. Regardless of which tone the show is taking at the moment, the action and dialogue is all completely absurd, and everything that happens is heightened for comedic effect or to service a joke or gag. Though there is a thin murder mystery plot, it takes a back seat to the comedy, and is eventually brought to a completely nonsensical conclusion. The show ends with the family dressed as the Partridge Family lip syncing to a Partridge Family song.

The show includes cameo appearances by David Letterman, whose show Elliott had been a writer and performer on for many years, and they engage in the exact same type of banter as on Late Night. Bob Elliott, Chris Elliott's father, also makes a cameo as a hot dog salesman.

Elliott followed up Action Family with another episode of Cinemax Comedy Experiment titled FDR: A One Man Show (1987). This time Elliott played a fictional version of himself portraying Franklin Delano Roosevelt in a one-man stage show discussing mostly fictional events of his life before a mostly live audience of senior citizens and cardboard cut-outs. This concept had been discussed by Elliott on Late Night, when his "Guy Under the Seats" character emerged dressed in the FDR costume.

Action Family and FDR: A One Man Show were eventually both packaged together and sold on VHS on October 6, 1995, but have never seen a DVD release.
