= Cinemax Comedy Experiment =

1985 American TV series

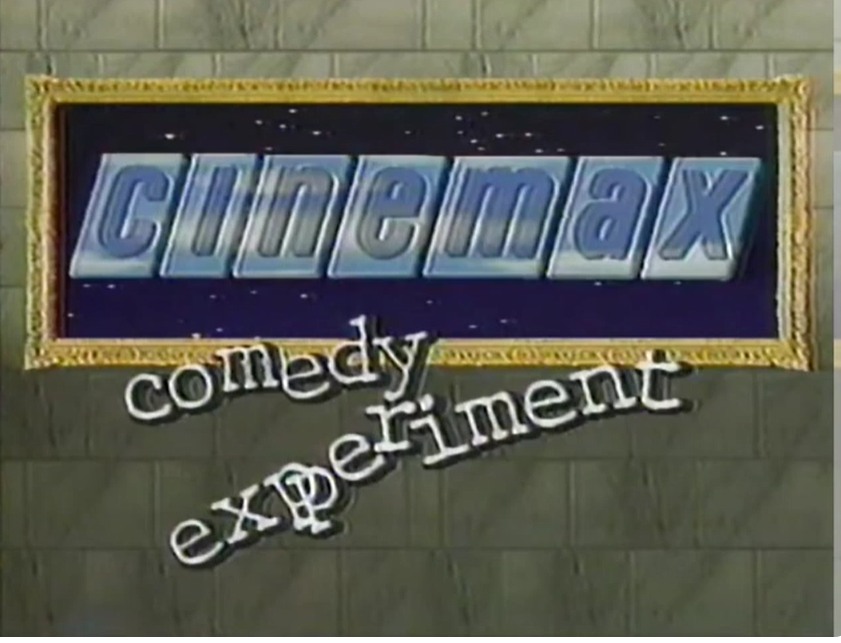
- Genre: Comedy anthology series
- Starring: Various
- Country of origin: United States
- Original language: English
- No. of episodes: 45

Production
- Running time: 30 minutes
- Production company: Various

Original release
- Network: Cinemax
- Release: February 16, 1985 – August 12, 1989

Cinemax Comedy Experiment is an anthology series broadcast on Cinemax throughout the mid-to-late 1980s. Every episode was written and directed by a different standup comedian.

The series was one of the first major comedy pay TV series on any pay TV network, and set the way for later comedy specials on Cinemax, such as those with Jerry Seinfeld. It was known for giving full creative freedom to those comedians for their episodes, with Cinemax executives giving few to any notes against anything presented outside of remaining within the time slot. The series came out of a time in the history of cable television when comedy programs were considered premium content due to the high grosses of comedy films at the box office. The program was also an attempt on Cinemax's part to compete with the rising popularity of video stores which affected the network's subscription base and retention.

Individuals who created "Experiments" include Harry Shearer, Chris Elliott, and Gilbert Gottfried; occasionally, non-standups were invited to contribute to the show, such as Garry Trudeau and Elizabeth Swados, who rewrote their off-Broadway show Rap Master Ronnie as an episode of the series. The Firesign Theatre adapted their album Eat Or Be Eaten as one episode.

== Episodes ==
No.	Title	Original release date
1	"Howie Mandel"	February 16, 1985
Comedian Howie Mandel presents his unique brand of comedy as he explores the comic possibilities of the average American shopping mall.
2	"Spitting Image"	March 16, 1985
Life-size puppets of President Reagan, Queen Elizabeth, Prince Charles and Sir John Gielgud are used to satirize current events.
3	"Sandra Bernhard"	April 25, 1985
Comedienne Sandra Bernhard pokes fun at show business.
4	"David Steinberg - Mothers"	May 12, 1985
The Smothers Brothers, Richard Simmons and other celebrities interview their own mothers in this anything goes show analyzing the chemistry between mothers and their offspring. Hosted by David Steinberg.
5	"Martin Mull Presents the History of White People in America, Part I"	June 4, 1985
Martin Mull presents a tongue-in-cheek look at the stereotypical suburban white family. Guest starring Mary Kay Place and Fred Willard.
6	"Martin Mull Presents the History of White People in America, Part II"	July 4, 1985
The humorist revisits Hawkins Falls, U.S.A.
7	"It's Just TV! Starring Harry Shearer"	August 1, 1985
Harry Shearer is the host for this parody that exposes what goes on at a San Francisco TV sales convention.
8	"American Carrott"	September 4, 1985
English comedian Jasper Carrott demonstrates his encounters with American eccentrics.
9	"Firesign Theatre: Eat or Be Eaten"	October 3, 1985
The troupe reports on behavior at the Kudzu Harvest Festival.
10	"Emo Philips"	November 17, 1985
He owes all his wit and fame to Zorkon the Space God; he is Emo Philips in his uproariously weird nightclub act from the New York nightclub Caroline's.
11	"Spitting Image II"	December 14, 1985
Life-size puppets parody celebrities.
12	"The Canadian Conspiracy, Part I"	January 15, 1986
Canada is secretly plotting to take over the United States by infiltrating the entertainment industry. Among the "suspects" are Martin Short, Howie Mandel, Anne Murray, Margot Kidder, William Shatner and Lorne Green.
13	"The Canadian Conspiracy, Part II"	February 8, 1986
The suspects tell more about Canada's secret plot to take over the United States.
14	"Michael Davis, Life of the Party"	March 5, 1986
Comedian and juggler Michael Davis is throwing a party and it's going to be a blast, mostly due to the fact that his vaudevillian friends are truly off the wall.
15	"From Here to Maternity"	April 20, 1986
The adventures of three together '80s women (Carrie Fisher, Lauren Hutton, Arleen Sorkin) who unite in their common desire to have a baby. Richard Simmons plays a birthing instructor.
16	"Bob Goldthwait: Don't Watch This Show"	May 24, 1986
Bobcat takes on a variety of subjects in a half-hour romp with guests Robin Williams, Whoopi Goldberg, Carol Kane, Dee Snider, Jack Gallagher and Tim Kazurinsky.
17	"Eric Bogosian: Drinking in America"	June 22, 1986
Eric Bogosian's one-man show is a parade of self-indulgent souls, from high-rollers to down-and-outers.
18	"Charlie Barnett: Terms of Enrollment"	July 11, 1986
Charlie Barnett promotes a video cassette that tells how to get into an ivy-league college. Cameo guests include Zsa Zsa Gabor, Marques Johnson and Cheech and Chong.
19	"Jim Belushi in Birthday Boy"	August 2, 1986
A traveling basketball salesman celebrating his 30th birthday, encounters misadventures on his way to making a big sale at his former high school. Written and produced by Jim Belushi.
20	"Shadoevision"	September 2, 1986
Shadoe Stevens satirizes movie serials and modern culture.
21	"But Seriously Folks"	October 16, 1986
Shecky Greene, Corbett Monica and Jan Murray share their favorite jokes, anecdotes and stories from New York's Borscht Belt to Broadway, Hollywood and Las Vegas.
22	"The Big Bang"	November 23, 1986
Robert Wuhl, Dennis Quaid and Paul Rodriquez star in a man-on-the-run spoof with nonstop wisecracks and gags set in a carnival sideshow.
23	"Comedy From Here"	December 8, 1986
Alex Cole endures a penny-pinching club owner, a bored emcee and a warm up act that steals his material in this comedian's eye view of life on stage. Written and directed by comedian Elayne Boosler.
24	"Action Family"	February 7, 1987
Comedian Chris Elliott stars as a private eye with a seemingly normal family, until he pursues a killer only to discover he may be after one of his own kids.
25	"I'll Do It Guy's Way"	March 21, 1987
Meet Guy DiSimone, the world's foremost Frank Sinatra impersonator. Timothy Stack wrote the script and stars in this charming spoof of Ol' Blue Eyes.
26	"Gilbert Gottfried, Naturally"	April 3, 1987
Brilliant at improvisation and a skilled impersonator as well, the lunatic Gilbert Gottfried is at his unpredictable best in this showcase special.
27	"Paul Shaffer: Viva Shaf Vegas"	May 15, 1987
In his solo comedy debut, Paul Shaffer portrays a man in search of the meaning of life, along with sex and stardom, in Las Vegas.
28	"Ann Magnuson's Vandemonium"	June 20, 1987
Ann Magnuson, one of Americas most innovative young talents takes you on an adventure through her pop culture world of comic characters.
29	"This Week Indoors"	July 19, 1987
Harry Shearer and Merrill Markoe star in a satire of the TV magazine-format featuring "hell cats of the White House" and man-in-the-street interviews.
30	"Stuart Pankin"	August 15, 1987
Stuart Pankin takes on Shakespeare, playing a director trying to interest backers in a splashy musical about Richard III.
31	"High School Video Yearbook with Franken & Davis"	September 7, 1987
Share the joys, dreams, apprehensions and coming of age of a real graduating class in this whimsical look at the world of high school.
32	"Sarducci's Vatican Inquirer"	October 18, 1987
Assigned by the Vatican Inquirer to get the real story of the papal tour, Father Guido's nose for news leads him from Florida to California.
33	"The New Home Owner's Guide to Happiness"	November 27, 1987
When barking dogs shatter their new suburban bliss, an upscale couple (Judge Reinhold and Demi Moore) finds wacky ways to hush the puppies.
34	"FDR: A One Man Show"	December 26, 1987
Chris Elliott mocks the one-man show routine with his version of FDR beset by comic calamities.
35	"Ron Reagan, The President's Son"	January 15, 1988
Ron Reagan proves he's much more than the President's son as he turns a case of mistaken identity to his advantage.
36	"Rap Master Ronnie"	February 14, 1988
President Ronald Reagan creates an unusual Congressional record with a little help from his friends.
37	"Carol Doesn't Leifer Anymore"	March 12, 1988
Up and coming comedienne Carol Leifer heads for the big city after splitting with her husband. What she finds isn't what she remembers though.
38	"Autobiographies: The Enigma of Bobby Bittman"	April 16, 1988
Eugene Levy, portraying his SCTV character, the most successful (and least talented) star in show business, lands a role in the sitcom "Over My Dead Bobby". Bobby marries a Mafia princess, a movie fiasco ends his career and he makes a comeback.
39	"Merrill Markoe's Guide to Glamorous Living"	May 18, 1988
Leading the high life is not all it's cracked up to be, with gorgeous men to fight off, maids to fire, and dogs to pamper. Is it worth it?
40	"Teri Garr in Flapjack Floozie"	June 17, 1988
Flapjack Floozie was born to be a star but her addiction to pancakes nearly ruins her career.
41	"K.O. Kippers"	August 13, 1988
Martin Von Haselberg and Brian Routh are Harry and Harry Kipper, bumbling boxers who head to Mexico City to capture the world title.
42	"Norman's Corner"	November 12, 1988
Gilbert Gottfried, as Norman, encounters Arnold Stang, Henny Youngman and Joe Franklin at his corner newsstand.
43	"Late for Dinner"	December 4, 1988
Tom Leopold stars as the host of a faltering late-night talk show in this comic behind-the-scenes look at the world of late-night television.
44	"Elayne Boosler: The Call"	February 17, 1989
Elayne Boosler plays a single New York career woman who spends a weekend waiting for the phone call from the man.
45	"Mike's Talent Show"	August 12, 1989
Maverick [Michael Smith] challenges the legendary emcees of the golden age of television with a new-wave vaudeville talent show for the '90s. Kevin Meaney, Steven Wright, Bunny Briggs and Lyle Lovett help out.
