= Cedric the Entertainer Presents =

- Genre: Comedy
- Created by: John Bowman; Cedric the Entertainer; Matt Wickline
- Presented by: Cedric the Entertainer
- Starring: Kyle Dunnigan; Big LeRoy Mobley
- Theme music composer: Rickey Minor
- Ending theme: "The Time Has Come for Me to Go" by Cedric the Entertainer
- Country of origin: United States
- Original language: English
- No. of seasons: 1
- No. of episodes: 21

Production
- Executive producers: Cedric the Entertainer; John Bowman; Matt Wickline; Stan Lathan
- Production locations: Los Angeles, California, United States
- Running time: 30 minutes
- Production companies: Regency Television; 20th Century Fox Television

Original release
- Network: Fox
- Release: September 18, 2002 – June 5, 2003

Cedric the Entertainer Presents is an American sketch comedy television series featuring dance numbers starring Cedric the Entertainer. The series premiered September 18, 2002 on Fox and after the first season, Fox renewed the show for a second season but canceled it just as the season was about to air.

== Cast ==
- Cedric the Entertainer
- Wendy Raquel Robinson
- Harold King
- Shaun Majumder
- Amy Brassette
- J. B. Smoove
- Kyle Dunnigan
- Lisa Joann Thompson

== Recurring sketches ==
- Cafeteria Lady
- Cooking with Chef Reverend
- Jingle Fever
- Love Doctor
- Player Babies
- Que Hora Es ("The Mexican soap opera for people who only had 3 weeks of Spanish in the 4th grade")
- Thug Pranks
- President Cedric
- The Horny Bears
- Raj
- Tap Dawgs
- Cicely & Cash
- Mama
- Dual Conscience
- Bathroom Guy
- Channel 6 News
- Schleppy & Fry Pan

== Awards ==
=== Award nominations ===
Art Directors Guild

- Television - Variety or Awards Show, Music Special or Documentary (2003)

Emmy Awards

- Outstanding Art Direction for a Variety or Music Program (2003)

Image Awards

- Outstanding Actor in a Comedy Series, Cedric the Entertainer (2003)
- Outstanding Supporting Actress in a Comedy Series, Wendy Raquel Robinson (2003)
- Outstanding Variety - Series or Special (2003)

Teen Choice Awards

- Choice TV Breakout Star - Male, Cedric the Entertainer (2003)
