= Frank TV =

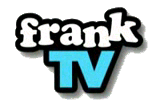
- Genre: Sketch comedy show
- Created by: Frank Caliendo; John Bowman; Matt Wickline
- Directed by: Jay Karas
- Starring: Frank Caliendo; Freddy Lockhart; Mike MacRae
- Country of origin: United States
- Original language: English
- No. of seasons: 2
- No. of episodes: 15

Production
- Executive producers: Frank Caliendo; John Bowman; Matt Wickline; Barry Katz
- Camera setup: Multi-camera
- Running time: 25 minutes

Original release
- Network: TBS
- Release: November 20, 2007 – December 23, 2008

Frank TV is an American sketch comedy show starring Frank Caliendo and created by Caliendo, John Bowman, and Matt Wickline. Caliendo hosted the show and performed in sketches in full makeup as characters he impersonated. The series aired on TBS from November 20, 2007, to December 23, 2008.

== Overview ==
The first episode of Frank TV premiered on November 20, 2007. The series was filmed in front of a live studio audience and featured an array of sketches filmed in front of various sets to resemble the likes of popular TV shows. In some sketches, Caliendo impersonated multiple characters on screen at once, such as one spoofing a Seinfeld reunion show set in the future where he plays Jerry, George, Kramer, Elaine, and Newman; and another with Al Pacino and Robert De Niro as movie critics.

Caliendo's castmates from Mad TV, Aries Spears and Mo Collins, guest starred on the show. Pat Kilbane and Pablo Francisco also guest starred but, they weren't on the show when Caliendo was. TBS promoted the show heavily during its baseball coverage, but the show garnered mixed reviews.

== Advertising ==
TBS aired teaser commercials for the show during its coverage of Major League Baseball during the 2007 postseason. A teaser was also released and shown in movie theaters before the official trailers began. These ads featured Frank dressed up as one of his many characters, often 3–5 in the same advertisement.

== Episodes ==
=== Season 1 (2007) ===
No.	Title	Original release date	Prod. code
1	"Franksgiving"	November 20, 2007	101
What Seinfeld would look like in the year 2027; John Madden prepares a turducken for the audience in honor of Thanksgiving; Frank pulls a co-host from the audience; three movie trailer announcers going on tour; Bill Clinton gives a tour of his Presidential library; President Bush gives his daughter a special father/daughter talk on the day of her wedding; and Frank's co-host plays Caliendo Squares with Charles Barkley. Guest starring Pablo Francisco and Don LaFontaine as themselves.
2	"Money in the Frank"	November 27, 2007	102
Donald Trump holds a seminar; President Bush tries to get back in America's good graces with a romantic dinner; Jack Nicholson has lost his pants; Al Pacino and Robert De Niro get a movie review show; and Sean Connery opens a voice club for men.
3	"Frankly, My Dear, I Don't Give a Frank"	December 4, 2007	103
Donald Trump opens his own one-man show on Broadway; President Bush holds press conferences during difficult times in the nation's past (Great Depression, Watergate, The crash of the RMS Titanic, etc); Al Pacino, Sean Connery, and Jack Nicholson all appear in bizarre foreign TV commercials; and in his latest role, William Shatner plays a judge.
4	"Ballpark Frank"	December 11, 2007	104
Frank portrays a manic Robin Williams, who tries to dominate the show, and offers a satirical doctoring of the series "Grey's Anatomy." Also: spoofs of Al Pacino, Michael Richards, Charles Barkley, and Bill Clinton. Guest starring Ernie Johnson Jr. and Kenny Smith as themselves.
5	"Frankincense and Myrrh"	December 18, 2007	105
Frank Caliendo jingles all the way in a holiday edition, mimicking Dr. Phil, a ranting Andy Rooney; and Al Gore, also a Rosie O'Donnell and Donald Trump cartoon is shown, and Charles Barkley hosts his own talk show, "In My 5".

=== Season 2 (2008) ===
No.	Title	Original release date
6	"Frankapalooza"	October 21, 2008
Oliver Stone gives his take on the Bill Clinton-Monica Lewinsky affair; James Gandolfini debuts his new show about puppies; what do Jedis do on their time off; what it would be like to have the character Jules Winnefield from Pulp Fiction as president; John McCain makes his pitch for the White House; and David Letterman has a new kids show.
7	"Damn Frankees"	October 28, 2008
Charles Barkley and Shaquille O'Neal co-host a political talk show; John Madden stars in a reality show; and a look back at Rush Limbaugh's early days as a DJ for disco music. Guest starring Aries Spears as Shaquille O'Neal.
8	"A Frank in the Hand is Worth 2 in a Bush"	November 4, 2008
On this election night special, President George W. Bush and Vice President Dick Cheney fill in for Frank.
9	"Frank of America"	November 11, 2008
Sketches include Donald Trump on parenting, a parody of Mary Tyler Moore if it were done in the style of The Office, Sean Connery becomes a victim of identity theft, and Shaggy and Scooby-Doo solve the mystery of who is haunting the White House. Guest starring Mo Collins as Mary Richards.
10	"Frankvergnugen"	November 18, 2008
Jay Leno welcomes Harrison Ford, Dave Chappelle and Amy Winehouse to be the guests on the final episode of The Tonight Show with Jay Leno; James Gandolfini does a commercial for a Russian vodka; Bill Clinton and Bill O'Reilly run into each other at a book expo, then Bill Clinton teaches Bill O'Reilly how to pick up women, namely Ann Coulter; Frank TV does their take off of Lost starring John Madden; Al Pacino and Robert De Niro argue over how they should rate movies, on their movie review show.
11	"Frank 2: Electric Boogaloo"	November 25, 2008
Judge William Shatner makes a case over a disputed fence between two neighbors more exciting; President Bush addresses the nation and announces his resignation; Bill Clinton hosts a new game show where women win money for keeping their pants on while talking to him; and what would it be like if other people did Andy Rooney's segment from 60 Minutes. Guest starring Pat Kilbane as Howard Stern.
12	"The Frank Robbers"	December 2, 2008
Jay Leno has a session with his psychologist; John Madden promotes his new video game Grand Theft Madden; Rip Torn, Dave Chappelle and Louie Anderson ruin a celebrity charity auction; what it would look like if Donald Trump was left poor and homeless; and The Comedy Central Roast of Sean Connery. Guest starring Pat Kilbane as Howard Stern.
13	"Franks for the Memories"	December 9, 2008
Pat O'Brien interviews stars of video games past; what would certain celebrities Oscar-winning speech would be; William Shatner and Ian McKellen fight over fans at a comic book convention; what it would look like if Jim Rome hosted a Martha Stewart type show; Andy Rooney does his commentary from the Stone Age; what would it be like if Al Pacino was in Star Wars; James Gandolfini shoots a commercial to attract vacationers to New Jersey.
14	"Mocha Latte Frankachino"	December 16, 2008
Harrison Ford and Sean Connery give a behind the scenes look at Indy 5; Ozzy Osbourne has trouble finding his prescription; another installment of Chuck 'n' Shaq focuses on why Shaquille O'Neal doesn't retire; Dave Chappelle buys him a new dog and then abandons it; William Shatner, Morgan Freeman and Rip Torn are denied alcohol at a restaurant, after they do not have their IDs with them; a look inside the intricate process of President Bush writing his memoir; Al Pacino gets a DVR installed. Guest starring Aries Spears as Shaquille O'Neal.
15	"Frank the Halls"	December 23, 2008
Donald Trump stars in a remake of Forrest Gump; William Shatner crashes the filming of the newest Star Trek movie; Jack Nicholson becomes a pitch-man for a sorority girls pillow fight party kit; Barry Katz, Frank's manager, has a discussion with Mike MacRae; Phil Gilford debuts his new and confusing game show Pass or Play; Yoda, Obi-Wan and Mace Windu gets stuck in airport security; and Kristoff Reok, Finland's answer to Chris Rock, showcases his unique stand-up skills.

== Cancellation ==
Frank TV was cancelled in January 2009. When asked about a third season, Caliendo commented by saying, "We’re not coming back. It hasn’t been announced, but we’re done. The time has come and gone for the show, unfortunately".
