= Shadoevision =

- Shadoevision title card
- Also known as: Cinemax Comedy Experiment: Shadoevision
- Genre: Sci-fi/Comedy
- Created by: Shadoe Stevens
- Written by: David P. Nichols
- Directed by: Chuck Cirino
- Starring: Shadoe Stevens, Gil Christner
- Narrated by: Shadoe Stevens
- Theme music composer: Ron Artis
- Country of origin: United States
- Original language: English

Production
- Executive producer: Shadoe Stevens
- Producer: Michael J. Hill
- Editor: Chris Culverhouse
- Running time: 29 minutes

Original release
- Network: Cinemax
- Release: September 2, 1986

Shadoevision is an episode of "The Cinemax Comedy Experiment" that first aired in 1986, and was repeated on Weird TV in 1995. It was hosted, created and produced by Shadoe Stevens.

== Plot ==
Norman Jones is just a run-of-the-mill CPA until he stumbles through a mysterious doorway into an alternate reality onto a spaceship where a talk show that is evolving mankind broadcasts from.

Unfortunately, he left the door open and the entire universe is at risk of being sucked through it. As well, World Control, a shadowy international corporation, has kidnapped Faith in an effort to capture Norman.

== Cast ==
- "Djony Dakota," "Burke," and Dr. Milton Oak - Shadoe Stevens
- Norman "Norm" Jones - Gil Christner
- Faith Pate' - Kim Zabinski
- Dorley Shrivel -
- Wiggy Higgins - Ed Freeman
- Nooter Blank -
- Bjorn Murt -
- Murky Dirge -
- Usher -
- Singers -
- Dr. Winston Taylor -
