= Franklin Ruehl =

American actor

Franklin Ruehl (Born 1950 - November 2015) was an American actor, ufologist and cryptozoologist. He has appeared on such shows as Jimmy Kimmel Live!, The Roseanne Show and Tom Green Live among others. Ruehl's show, Mysteries from Beyond the Other Dominion, started on a public-access television cable TV channel in the Los Angeles area in the late 1980s. In 1988 he interviewed Louis Wendruck, president of the Dark Shadows Fan Club of Southern California, on the show. Then it became the first Sci Fi Channel original series in 1992. In 2006, he hosted several new episodes of the show on TomGreen.com.

Ruehl auditioned for America's Got Talent in 2009 with an act that encompassed sticking straws into a potato, he was rejected by the judges. In 2010, he appeared on several episodes of 1000 Ways to Die, as an expert, portraying a cryptozoologist, a conspiracy expert and a deathologist (or thanatologist). His show Professor Weird debuted at 9pm on August 18, 2012 on the Science Channel.

Ruehl has been a regular on "A Current Affair" (2005), "9 On The Town" (with a UFO segment), "Strange Universe," "Weird TV," and Ancient Aliens (on the History Channel). He co-hosted a radio program on Blog Talk Radio, "Hypergalactic Enigmas." Ruehl has a series of videos entitled The Realm of Bizarre News..

On his biography page for the Contributor platform published by The Huffington Post Ruehl wrote that he held a Ph.D. in theoretical nuclear physics from UCLA.

Ruehl died in November 2015, of natural causes.
