= Blasto (video game) =

1998 video game

- North America cover art
- Developer: Sony Interactive Studios America
- Publisher: Sony Computer Entertainment
- Producers: Jonathan Beard; David Poe
- Designer: Jonathan Beard
- Programmer: Dylan Cuthbert
- Writers: Jonathan Beard; Benjamin Harrison; Thomas Tobey; Matt Wickline
- Composer: Chuck Doud
- Platform: PlayStation
- Release: NA: April 16, 1998; EU: August 1, 1998
- Genres: Third-person shooter, platform
- Mode: Single-player

Blasto is a 1998 3D third-person shooter platform game developed by Sony Interactive Studios America, and published by Sony Computer Entertainment for the PlayStation. Phil Hartman voiced Captain Blasto, an extremely muscular, alien-fighting, dimwitted captain.

Blasto was a high profile project for Sony, which invested a great deal of development resources on unorthodox programming techniques and a heavy marketing push towards making it a bestseller. The game was met with an unfavorable response, as critics said it suffers from frustrating controls, derivative concepts, and long stretches of play time spent wandering in search of objectives.

== Gameplay ==
The game is a 3D third-person shooter platformer. The enemies are aliens that teleport in around the player based on events that are triggered as the player explores the environment. The game has a strong platforming factor, with elements such as rotating 3D sections which have to be navigated while shooting at aliens. Puzzle elements tend to be limited to simple "find the switch to proceed" scenarios. However, some of the elements within the game require the player to utilize different weaponry in certain situations in order to advance to the next area. Blasto is one of the few PlayStation games to use both control sticks. The left stick offers better movement control than the D-Pad and the right stick can be used to adjust the player's aim.

== Development and release ==
Though it was not announced until the June 1997 Electronic Entertainment Expo, Blasto had been secretly in development since 1995. Wanting the game to be free of load times, the development team made the game stream constantly off the CD. This made it impossible to use Red Book audio, so the music had to be done in MIDI format.

None of the PlayStation's graphics libraries were used for the game, with the developers instead using custom tools and low-level programming to bring models built in Alias directly into the game. Another custom tool enabled the designers to track which parts of the game world were most heavily trafficked by playtesters, so that they could tweak level design to either redirect players towards specific areas or move important elements from widely ignored areas to more heavily trafficked ones. Instead of texture mapping, vertex lighting was used to give color and definition to the floors. Because vertex lighting is a time-consuming process for artists, Sony gave the Blasto team carte blanche in taking artists from other teams to get the project completed on time.

Producer and designer Jonathan Beard stated that the game's protagonist Captain Blasto was conceived as a parody of heroes such as Flash Gordon and Buck Rogers but with a comedic amount of overconfidence. Lead artist Ben Harrison described the character as an amalgamation of Duck Dodgers, Powdered Toast Man, and Dirty Harry. Actor and comedian Phil Hartman provided the voice for the game's eponymous hero. While developing the character, Beard claimed the team had Hartman in mind while coming up with his voice. Hartman stated he spent six hours recording all of the protagonist's possible dialogue during a single-day session. Initially announced for a late 1997 release, Blasto was later pushed back to the first quarter of 1998. Sony did not provide a specific reason for the delay, but lead programmer Dylan Cuthbert later recounted that the development schedule proved too harsh for the team, resulting in burnout, and several key members of the team left mid-development.

In the version of the title released in PAL regions, the original episode (level) 3 was removed due to space limitations, since the PAL version included a number of languages.

The game also had a Japanese release planned as advertised via a promo video included on Dengeki PlayStation D14 under the name Captain Blasto (キャプテンブラスト, Kyaputen Burasuto), but was cancelled for unknown reasons.

== Reception ==
Reception

Aggregate score
Aggregator	Score
GameRankings	65%

Review scores
Publication	Score
AllGame	3/5
Edge	5/10
Electronic Gaming Monthly	6.375/10
Game Informer	8.25/10
GameRevolution	B+
GameSpot	4.2/10
IGN	5/10
Next Generation	2/5
Official U.S. PlayStation Magazine	3.5/5
Entertainment Weekly	A−

The game received mixed to middling reviews from critics. Critics almost unanimously remarked that the game is frequently frustrating due to a variety of issues with the controls and level designs. Shawn Smith of Electronic Gaming Monthly (EGM), for example, commented that "Blasto's problem is bad control. Avoiding enemy fire is way too hard and falling to your death is way too easy, even when using the Analog pad. No one wants to die in an action game by falling either - they want to die getting eaten by a tentacle beast with fangs!" GameSpot instead cited the frequency with which enemies appear by teleportation as the biggest frustration, and both GameSpot and IGN found frustration in how enemies can shoot through some obstacles that block the player's shots. GamePro remarked, "Shooting accurately during blaster battles is tough. Swinging Blasto around precisely is difficult, and he makes his strafing move with hard-to-manage, quick, choppy steps." IGN and Next Generation criticized that players often end up wandering through the massive levels with no way of knowing where to go for long periods.

Reactions to the humor were more mixed. Smith and Next Generation both found the dimwitted superhero theme had become a tired cliche, with Next Generation saying it was particularly derivative of the 1996 video game Captain Quazar. GamePro was also unimpressed: "The E.T. butt-kicking takes place on Uranus... the planet... and the humor is at about that level throughout the game." However, both Smith and GamePro, as well as Smith's co-reviewer Dan Hsu, also praised Phil Hartman's voice acting. IGN, on the other hand, said his performance seemed phoned in.

Next Generation said that Blasto had become outdated due to its prolonged development cycle, and that, "In the end, despite all the problems, this isn't the worst game ever released for PlayStation, but it doesn't hold a candle to the best, or even the mediocre." GamePro was more positive, concluding that despite the frustrations with the controls, Blasto is satisfyingly lengthy and decently fun. Of EGM's four-person review team, John Davison said that the game would "keep you reasonably absorbed" despite a lack of originality, while Shawn Smith, Dan Hsu, and Kelly Rickards assessed that, while not awful, it was too frustrating to recommend. IGN summarized Blasto as "a game that isn't entirely bad, but one which is too clever for its own good. It's like they wanted to have Earthworm Jim's zaniness, Tomb Raider's puzzle solving, and Mario's level design, but with a Looney Tunes twist. The end result is somewhat different." Like the EGM reviewers, GameSpot concluded that "There's a good game here - that can be seen from the first three levels - it's simply hidden under many layers of frustration. With some tweaks to the timing, perspective, graphics, gameplay mechanics, and level design, it's obvious that Blasto could've been everything it was meant to be. It reaches to be entertaining, but really falls short."
