= Rap Master Ronnie =

1980s musical comedy series

Rap Master Ronnie is the name of several musical comedies developed by Garry Trudeau and Elizabeth Swados throughout the 1980s, including a 1984 off-Broadway "partisan revue," a music video, and a made for TV movie starring The Smothers Brothers, Carol Kane, and Jon Cryer. The shows all share the same basic structure of a faux campaign ad for Ronald Reagan, satirizing his social policies, particularly those regarding drugs and minorities. The shows received largely mixed reviews.

== Background ==
Garry Trudeau was a vocal critic of Reagan throughout his presidency, and devoted considerable space in his comic strip Doonesbury to attacking his policies, administration, and Reagan himself. In the early 1980s, Trudeau took a hiatus from the strip to write Doonesbury: A Musical Comedy, a Broadway show that brought an end to many of the strip's long running story lines in anticipation of rebooting it in a format that eliminated its floating timeline and allowed the characters to age and grow. In addition to the play's narrative, it also featured several self-contained sketches satirizing the Reagan administration; after the play closed, Trudeau and Swados decided to expand on the sketches and turn them into their own show, timing the release to the 1984 presidential election.

A music video was produced in conjunction with the play, to be used as a satirical fundraising tape by the San Francisco Democratic Party. The video was shot on location in Washington, D.C., and featured professional Reagan impersonator Robert H. Schmidt as well as several break dancers credited as "The Doonesbury Break Crew".

In 1985, the play was revived in Los Angeles.

Four years later, as Reagan's presidency drew to a close, Swados and Trudeau updated the show as a made for TV movie that aired on late night Cinemax in 1988 as part of the network's comedy programming block "Cinemax Comedy Experiment." This version was titled "Rap Master Ronnie: A Report Card".

== Plot summary ==
The play is presented as sixteen interlinking musical numbers, each attacking some political position of Reagan's or examining the effects Reaganomics had on the American economy and culture of the 1980s. The story is presented within a frame narrative of Ronald Reagan, Nancy Reagan, Edwin Meese, and several Secret Service agents (who serve as the chorus) taking a limo into the inner city to film a campaign ad encouraging blacks to vote for him. Despite the title, only the opening number is performed in the style of old-school hip hop, with the remainder of the songs being 1980s style pop.

== Casts ==
=== Off-Broadway cast ===
- Reathel Bean as Ronald Reagan
- Catherine Cox
- Ernestine Jackson as Nancy Reagan/various
- Mel Johnson Jr.
- Richard Ryder
- "The Doonesbury Break Crew"

=== Music video ===
- Robert H. Schmidt as Ronald Reagan
- "The Doonesbury Break Crew"

=== Film cast ===
- Jim Morris as Ronald Reagan
- Carol Kane
- Jon Cryer
- The Smothers Brothers

== Reception ==
The play received generally mixed to positive reviews. The New York Times praised the more overtly satirical numbers, particularly those related to Reagan's job policies and views on women's rights, but criticized Trudeau's efforts to be more serious, calling them "more sincere than compelling". The Times also criticized the play's portrayal of minorities, calling them "abstractions, not characters." Conversely, the television movie was negatively reviewed, with the Los Angeles Times calling it "incessantly unfunny" and criticizing the show for reusing the same jokes that several other comedians had been using about Reagan for years, without enough original material or insights.

== In popular culture ==
The Simpsons 1994 episode "Homer Loves Flanders" parodies the show as "Rappin' Ronnie Reagan," a novelty song that Homer owns on cassette tape. The show is referenced again in the episode "Lisa on Ice", with Kent Brockman delivering a sensationalized news headline: "President Reagan dyes... his hair, says Garry Trudeau in his new musical comedy revue!"
