= List of In Living Color sketches =

This is a list of sketches on In Living Color.

== Recurring sketches ==
=== A ===
- Al MacAfee – A parody of Joe Louis Clark, David Alan Grier plays a strict, yet clueless shop teacher with a bad hip. He is known for working as a Hall Monitor and using a bullhorn to yell at innocent students and teachers, while being oblivious to bad things going on around him, as well as the consistent rejection by a fellow female teacher (played by Kim Wayans), with whom he is infatuated. Various cast members portray students and teachers who put up with Mr. MacAfee.
- Andrea Dice Clay – Kelly Coffield portrays the female counterpart of raunchy, wise-guy comedian Andrew Dice Clay. With sayings like "Ya think that's easy to do when you're stacked like this?" and "The last time I saw something like that, it had an eraser at the end of it." A related set of skits featured Coffield as "Samantha Kinison," a female version of rage-filled comic Sam Kinison. Kinison himself appeared in a sketch, where Samantha Kinison is revealed to be his wife.
- Anton Jackson – Damon Wayans portrays a filthy, drunken homeless person (he lives in a corrugated cardboard box) with a unique world view. Amongst other happenings, he appeared in Po' People's Court (taken from The People's Court), had his own Public-access television cable TV show entitled This Ol' Box (taken from This Old House), and had a marriage of convenience. He frequently carried with him his "personal facilities", a jar that he used as a toilet and which seemed to contain a floating pickle and brine (probably meant to represent urine and a turd). The character was also shown on an episode of Saturday Night Live hosted by Damon Wayans where Anton testifies in the O. J. Simpson trial, and was also briefly in 1992's Mo' Money featuring Damon and younger brother Marlon Wayans. According to Damon Wayne on his HBO special One Night Stand, the character is based on a guy named Anton who dated his sister Deidre and would do speedball (combination of heroin and cocaine).
- Arsenio Hall – The former late-night talk show host is played by Keenen Ivory Wayans, complete with a long index finger and prosthetic rear end. Many of Hall's mannerisms are incorporated into the sketches, including his riotous laugh and dance and the phrases "I haven't seen it yet, but my people tell me..." and "strive to be number one." Hall is also portrayed as being obsessed with his Coming to America co-star and friend, Eddie Murphy.
- Ace and Main Man – Jamie Foxx and Tommy Davidson play of a pair of bouncers who never seem to let anyone in the club that should be let in, because they do not think it is that person. Often enough, they run into the featured celebrity (Johnny Gill, Tupac Shakur, and others) and proceed to deny them (for the same reasons) to the point where a fight is about to break out. Then, when their boss (or news reporters covering the event) comes out, Tommy's hyper-active character flips on Jamie's character, leaving Jamie to humiliation, and Tommy's character going into the club, only to be immediately kicked out himself.

=== B ===
- Mr. and Ms. Brooks – Kim Wayans and David Alan Grier play a seemingly loving elderly couple who constantly insult and attempt to kill each other. After numerous failed attempts, they resort to attacking each other, such as when Ms. Brooks realizes her husband had laid a trap for her and she pulls out a sword and says "Prepare to Enter the Dragon!", prompting Mr. Brooks to reply "The only thing I see draggin' around here is your saggy breasts!" Their old age causes them to fall to the ground and be unable to get up, when they are interrupted by someone who is under the impression they are about to engage in sexual intercourse. They usually end with "And we stiiiiilll together!"
- Benita Butrell – Kim Wayans portrays a neighborhood woman who breaks the fourth wall by gossiping directly to the viewer and airing her neighbors' dirty laundry once they are out of earshot. She ends her remarks on each of her targets by saying, "But I ain't one to gossip, so you ain't heard that from me." She claims to be very close to a "Miss Jenkins", who ironically is usually the target of her most vicious gossip.
- The Brothers Brothers – Two brothers both named Tom Brothers (Damon and Keenen Ivory Wayans) who discuss black issues despite not realizing they are black. The pair were a parody of the Smothers Brothers; the original sketch had them hosting their own TV show, akin to The Smothers Brothers Comedy Hour. Some episodes included their double dating, or applying to a country club and failing to notice its clandestine whites-only policy. In each sketch, they punctuated their conversations with short songs in which they accompanied themselves on acoustic guitar and upright bass.
- Background Guy – Jim Carrey plays a guy who does wacky funny stuff while news anchors are doing serious news commentaries. In one sketch he was a football player doing goofy antics while sports anchors are doing the halftime report during the Super Bowl; in another that featured the White House Press Secretary, he was doing even more bizarre things such as joining in a kickline of can-can dancers or recreating George Washington crossing the Delaware River.

=== C ===
- Calhoun Tubbs – David Alan Grier portrays an old bluesman whose songs invariably insult or otherwise offend his audience. Catchphrase: "I wrote a song about it. Like to hear it? Here it go!" (His catchphrase would later be used as the intro to En Vogue's "Free Your Mind".) He always strums the same bar of blues and ends his little songs with a falsetto "Ahhhh haaa", and concludes with a shouted "Thank you very much!". He once claims to have written over 12,000 songs (none of them over 13 seconds long) and sold more records than Michael Jackson and the Beatles in upper New Jersey. David Alan Grier based the character on the famed Ann Arbor, Michigan personality "Shakey Jake" Woods, with whom he was familiar from his days at the University of Michigan.
- Candy Cane – Alexandra Wentworth portrays a host to a children's television show. Candy has serious adult issues that she brings up on the would-be kiddie show, such as getting stood up on dates and men who had sex with her and never called her back. However, she still manages to smile and present the show like a female Mr. Rogers. Marc Wilmore appears as 'Jurassic Benny' a purple dinosaur (obviously a reference to the famous Barney from Barney & Friends). Candy loves him and Benny often rejects her on camera, then she gets angry and calls him out for him leaving after they've had their most recent affair off screen, to where the actor pulls off the mask and tells her to leave him alone.
- Carl "The Tooth" Williams – Jamie Foxx portrays a boxer a la Mike Tyson who has lost every bout he has been in. He is always getting beaten up by everyone he comes in contact with. One commentary said he looks like "a Ringling Brothers clown that got run over by a truck". The name is a takeoff on heavyweight boxer Carl "The Truth" Williams. Catchphrase: "Hollerin' 187 wit' my glove in ya mouth" is paraphrased from a line by Snoop Dogg in the Dr. Dre single: "Dre Day" One distinct physical characteristic of Carl's besides his prominent tooth, is his jheri curl.
- Cephus and Reesie – Kim Wayans and David Alan Grier play a pair of incredibly annoying soul singers, modeled slightly after Ashford & Simpson. Episodes with Cephus and Reesie included them mistakenly performing at a Bar Mitzvah, an advertisement for an album of theirs, which is eight CDs long due to them breaking songs such as "Silent Night" by one of them asking "If it was a silent night, how could it have been a holy night?", and an episode where they sing an extended rendition of "Ain't No Mountain High Enough" for a Death Row convict (Jim Carrey) who (regrettably) is granted his last wish to hear some live soul music before he dies that very night. Cephus and Reesie were also said to have jammed with Frenchie and appeared in an off-Broadway show called "Get Off the Lord's Bus If You Ain't Got Correct Change."
- Cheap Pete – Chris Rock (when he guest starred during the final season) as a cheapskate who won't pay more than $1.25 for anything. His catchphrase is "Good Lord that's a lot of money!" The Cheap Pete character is based on and originated from a bit part Rock played in I'm Gonna Git You Sucka. Cheap Pete was also featured in Rock's film "CB4" and an audio track from his 1997 album "Roll with the New".

=== D ===
- "The Dirty Dozens" – Stu Dunfy (Nick Bakay) hosts a game show that is a cross between Jeopardy! and Concentration (though some episodes are modeled after Wheel of Fortune and the Pyramid game shows hosted by Dick Clark) in which contestants are involved in a battle of insults. Two of the contestants that appear in almost every "Dozens" skit include returning champion T-Dog Jenkins (Jamie Foxx) and unlucky-with-categories contestant Amfeny Clark (Reggie McFadden). Variations include Family Dozens and Wheel of Dozens. In one episode, Ed O'Neill guest starred as himself, portraying the show's "all-time champion" and defeating T-Dog.
- Duke and Cornbread Turner – Jamie Foxx plays a senior citizen named Cornbread who performs tricks with his dead German Shepherd named Duke (whom he believes to be still alive). In one skit Duke was shown to be the father of a litter of puppies (also deceased). In another sketch it is revealed that Duke's real name is Jeremy Jolly Rancher Remington Steele Lewy Cadburry the 3rd to the 4th power. A running gag features Cornbread mistaking people he meets for children who died in tragic accidents. His catchphrase is "I'll be John Brown".
- "Dysfunctional Home Show" – An alcoholic, depressed, and incestuous divorced father named Grandpa Jack McGee (Jim Carrey) hosts a housekeeping show, along with his promiscuous daughter (Alexandra Wentworth), her abusive boyfriend-turned-husband (Jamie Foxx), and Grandpa Jack's drunken, hateful mother (Kelly Coffield). Grandpa Jack also had a son who was not screwed up like the rest of the family, and had to guide him away from his drunken mistakes, such as Grandpa Jack starting to shadow box when he heard an oven timer, and the son yelling offstage that is not a boxing bell, but the chime of an oven. The trademark quip for this show is that Grandpa Jack would say "pork and beans" in a slurred tone (and then he would repeat it again by shouting it), as the family often dined on that particular dish.

=== E ===
- East Hollywood Squares – An urbanized version of the original (1966–1981) Hollywood Squares, with Peter Marshall as himself, along with such occasional real-life celebrities as Gary Coleman and Fred Berry. Cast members portrayed actors and actresses such as Dr. Dre (David Alan Grier), Antonio Fargas (Tommy Davidson), Little Richard (Jamie Foxx), Garrett Morris (Jamie Foxx), and Isabel Sanford (Marc Wilmore). Morris and Foxx later worked together on The Jamie Foxx Show.
- Ed Cash and Carl Pathos – Co-pastors of the "First Church of Discount Sin" and crooked televangelists, with Damon Wayans as Cash, the afro-wearing pastor who names and shames people who do not deliver their required tithes, speaks in nonsensical tongues, sells indulgences, and heals parishioners by taking their wallets. Pathos (pronounced in a way that it sounds like "Pesos" with a lisp), portrayed by Jim Carrey, is a pastiche of televangelists such as Robert Schuller and Jimmy Swaggart (in one sketch quoting Swaggart's "I have sinned" speech) with unusual tics and numerous sexual perversions. Cash and Pathos co-hosted a number of television shows, including The 595 Club (a discount version of The 700 Club) and a straight parody of the Hour of Power in which Cash resorts to robbing the congregation when the necessary tithes do not come in; in each sketch, Pathos usually ends each service with a parody of a Southern gospel tune. In a later sketch, Cash and Pathos are called before Congress to account for their questionable practices.

=== F ===
- Fire Marshal Bill Burns – Jim Carrey portrayed a crazed, masochistic (and supposedly immortal) fire marshal with a manic grin and laugh along with a scarred face whose safety advisories usually include demonstrating (on himself) the very disaster he is warning against. (Every sketch illustrates a timeline of readily visible damage on Bill from previous episodes). Usually, the warnings are against ridiculous situations that would never come to pass, such as an alien crab-people invasion, a sex doll that was accidentally inflated with hydrogen instead of air which then exploded due to static electricity, or an outbreak of psychotic elves. Every sketch ends with Fire Marshal Bill blowing up the facility he is teaching at, to which the people involved look at the burning facility and either lament what will become of them or simply stare in shock while Fire Marshal Bill says a witty comment and (sometimes) leaves to do more "safety advisories". Despite each sketch showing him lose parts of his body (in one sketch, only his head remained), Bill never dies. In one episode when on a cruise, he had a blonde wife named Ashley (a play on the term ash) who also was seemingly immune to the damage Bill caused. Her face was similarly scarred like Bill's was and she was a party to his demonstrations (spreading gasoline in a life raft to prove Bill's point about the danger of flare guns,) and she has the same perpetual manic grin as Bill. Fire Marshal Bill's catchphrases included "Lemme show ya something!!", "Everybody remain calm... I am a Fire Marshal!", "It can be very, very DTUHHH-DTUHHH ... DEADLY!" and (once or more per sketch) replying "So it is!" to someone informing him that something (often a part of his body) is on fire (as well as occasionally in response to people telling him other things, such as the fact that a Great White Shark is eating him.)
- Frenchie (Keenan Ivory Wayans) – An obnoxious, but happy-go-lucky "Partay Animal" with a flair for blending the fashion of the late 1970s with that of the early to mid-1980s (his attire consists of red platform shoes, a red pleather suit with yellow vinyl fringe, long jheri curls, sunglasses and gold chains). Frenchie somewhat resembles Rick James and seems to turn all events, even an Alcoholics Anonymous meeting, into parties. Frenchie says he owns an AMC Gremlin that has had a car boot on it for a long time. He also claims to have jammed with Cephus and Reesie. His catchphrase is "... 'Cause I'm hip, I'm slick, and all the women love my (fill in the blank)". In fact, on Frenchie's second appearance in which he toasts a friend's bachelor party, he did say towards the end of the skit – "...'Cause I'm hip, I'm slick and all the women love my – ...y'all fill it in."
- Funky Finger Productions ("Black-Strong" also called "B.S. Brothers") – Two showbiz charlatans, Clavell (played by David Alan Grier) and Howard Tibbs III (played by Tommy Davidson), with a knack for commandeering events (a funeral, a Hollywood Walk of Fame ceremony) and property (a movie set), both public and private, or Keenan Ivory Wayans' monologue, to promote their latest flim-flam "project". The would-be moguls enter by shouting "this must be the place!" in unison. They claim to have managed a band of 16 horn players called "Satern", but later had to fire ten horns. From there, they undermine their grandiose pitches with ill-conceived videos, business cards with their mothers' address and telephone number, or business cards of other businesses such as carpet cleaners with the proper business crossed out and their names written on it, and reliance on public transportation. Another stunt was for one of them to have their phone number shaved into their hair, which quickly turned into a basketball afro. Their spiel invariably climaxes when Tibbs stuns the unsuspecting mark by suddenly pulling out an item integral to the sales pitch (e.g., business card, sales brochure, video cassette) while simultaneously shouting "BAM!".

=== G ===
- Great Moments in Black History – Either Tommy Davidson or David Alan Grier, in a quasi-serious tone of voice, narrates reenactments of dubious moments in African-American history. Examples include the accidental invention of the jheri curl (when motor oil leaked on a Jiffy Lube worker's large afro during an oil change), the first Def Comedy Jam (where a man resembling Martin Lawrence, played by Foxx, while putting up a banner, accidentally hit his hand and started cursing, much to the audience's delight), the first party DJ (a man named Ho accidentally bumps into a record player and scratches the record), the first black astronaut to be abandoned on the Moon, and the advent of the self-serve gas station, where a rude service station worker yells to a customer "Get it yo' damn self!"

The format of this sketch is likely an inspiration for several segments and skits on Grier's 2008 Comedy Central program Chocolate News. This sketch has since been replicated on Chappelle's Show.

- Groom Room: An inner city barber shop plays host to David Alan Grier as an incompetent barber. Unsuspecting customers, who sit in his chair against the advice of a much more seasoned barber (Jamie Foxx) are asked how they want their hair cut. Grier's character, unable to hear, asks questions such as "You want your name across the back?" and "You want a tail down the back?" before becoming frustrated and ordering the customer to point to a poster showing hair styles. The barber will then massacre the haircut, much to the anger and outrage of the customer. The barber will then demand "Where's my tip, Sucka?" to the customer storming out of the barber shop. The premiere "Groom Room" skit featured Cuba Gooding Jr. as a patron in the barber shop while a later skit featured the famous singer James Brown in a cameo.

=== H ===
- Handi Man – Damon Wayans portrays a handicapped superhero (possessing super-strength, flight, invulnerability and several other powers), who sometimes has a midget sidekick (Tiny Avenger, played by Debbie Lee Carrington). He attempts to foil villains, between bouts of uncontrollable drooling. Major villains include Isadora and Doctor Naughty; the former has attempted to eliminate Handi Man and the Tiny Avenger, or kidnap a ballerina to steal her dancing abilities, while the latter is a villain who hates handicapped people and sees Handi Man as his main adversary. Doctor Naughty concocted plans such as making an evil robot double of Handi-Man to simultaneously destroy Handi-Man's good name and rob from the March of Dimes vault, or using an attractive female nurse to seduce Handi-Man into wearing "kripple-nite" and rendering him powerless. His secret identity was "Clark Bent," (a play on Superman's secret identity Clark Kent) a mail courier at the Daily Glove newspaper. It was one of the sketches that generated a large amount of controversy for the show due to its ablest perspective, laughing at people with disabilities, especially people with cerebral palsy. Despite it being deeply offensive towards the disabled community, it remains one of the best known sketches of the show.
- Head Detective – Damon Wayans portrays a police detective who, due to a horrific accident, is merely a head attached to a pair of feet and tiny hands and appearing similar to Mr. Potato Head. Along with his full-bodied partner (played by Keenen Ivory or Marlon Wayans), he solves crimes, often catching the perpetrators by being thrown, kicked, or bowled toward them.
- Hey Mon – Damon Wayans heads the hard-working British West Indian/Jamaican Hedley family, each with many careers. With his "lazy good-for-nothing" son (Tommy Davidson) who wears traditional dreadlocks, they find nothing more appalling than meeting people with two or fewer jobs (including small children), regardless of how much money they make in those one or two jobs. Some sketches would show the family owning their own business, such as a hospital or an airline, with a joke being that multiple responsibilities would all be filled by the family members. A sketch would usually end with the family breaking the fourth wall and yelling to the viewer "Hey mon, got to go to work!", as calypso music ends the sketch.
- Homeboy Shopping Network – Two streetwise pitchmen named Whiz and Iceman (Damon and Keenen Ivory Wayans) use a Home Shopping Network-style approach to sell stolen goods. The phrase "Mo' Money, Mo' Money!" was coined in this sketch (even though Wayans originally said this on a Weekend Update segment on Saturday Night Live back when he was a feature player in the 1985–1986 season). The time limit imposed on sales was typically due to the impending arrival of the police. The concept was created by Howard Kuperberg, one of the show's original writers.
- Homey D. Clown – Damon Wayans plays an ex-con who works as a clown (real name Herman Simpson) for his parole agreement, but lashes out at anyone (usually by hitting them on the head with a weighted sock) who attempts to make him perform the standard antics of the role – "I don't think so! Homey don't play that!" His goal in life is to get even with "The Man", a personification of the white male establishment "holding him down". Near the end of most sketches, Homey would lead a group of children (played by the cast members) in a call and response sing-along, which would end with him degenerating into a rant, then intimidating the children into repeating after him. One of the most popular characters in the show's history, Homey was the only In Living Color character to get his own video game.

=== I ===
- Ice Poe – Shawn Wayans plays a violent street poet who recites eloquent threats to get what he wants. He is usually foiled by an equally poetic undercover cop (David Alan Grier).

=== L ===
- Lashawn – T'Keyah Crystal Keymáh plays various customer service jobs, giving major ghetto sassy attitude to the customers. The clips always end with her leaving for her lunch break, usually leaving the customer hanging. She was sometimes accompanied by a goofball who would always claim he had experience from being with "me and Larry", but would screw up simple tasks, such as burning a hamburger and saying "I got experience in a striped grill, not one that is flat!"
- Les and Wes – Damon and Keenen Ivory Wayans portray a pair of conjoined twins attached at the side. Wes is a celebrity, while Les is not, often having a job unrelated to Wes'.
- Little Miss Trouble − Kelly Coffield plays as Edna Louise, an elementary school troublemaker. Edna constantly makes trouble for her teacher (Kim Wayans, done up to be a frumpy schoolteacher) and classmates, particularly a dorky classmate named Parnell (Jim Carrey) with whom she constantly squabbles.
- Loomis Simmons – David Alan Grier plays a shady infomercial host shilling out ridiculous products and services. Examples include ineffective self-help audio tapes and "Custom Built Condoms" that only fit Mr. Simmons.

=== M ===
- Men on... (Damon Wayans and David Alan Grier) – In this parody of Siskel & Ebert, a pair of extremely effeminate gay men, Blaine Edwards and Antoine Merriweather, review topics completely based on their potential for homoerotic content. Variations of this sketch include Men on Books, Men on Television, Men on Fitness, Men on Vacation, Men on Art, and Men on Football. It was the source of many popular catchphrases such as, "Hated It!" (used for any film/book/program centered on one or more female characters), "Fish!", "My second favorite form of liquid protein", "Three words—fa – bu – lous!" and "the yet unheard of Zorro snap, in Z formation!" (Nearly every episode featured some variation of their "two snaps up" finger-snap gesture of approval.) In a two-part season-ending cliffhanger sketch, Blaine gets hit on the head by a stage light and gets a sort of amnesia, making him straight and conventionally "macho"; Antoine tries to restore his normal personality by hitting him in the head with a frying pan and a cinder block, both of which failed. His personality is only restored after being hit in the face by Antoine. The characters were resurrected for an episode of SNL hosted by Damon Wayans, and again when David Alan Grier hosted SNL. The theme song to the pair's "show" was "It's Raining Men" by The Weather Girls.
- Music Video Parodies – Cast members regularly performed "Weird Al" Yankovic-type takeoffs on songs while portraying the singers who made them popular. Two of the most memorable parodies were "White, White Baby" featuring Jim Carrey riffing on Vanilla Ice's "Ice Ice Baby" and "Baby's Got Snacks" by Trail Mix-A-Lot, a parody of "Baby Got Back" by Sir Mix-A-Lot. Other parodies included "Black or White" and "Billie Jean" by Michael Jackson (with Tommy Davidson playing Jackson), "Gypsy Woman" by Crystal Waters and parodied by Kim Wayans, "Promise of a New Day" by Paula Abdul (with Kelly Coffield as Abdul) "I'm Your Baby Tonight" by Whitney Houston (with Kim Wayans playing Houston), Snow's "Informer" (with Jim Carrey as Snow), and "Me Want Maury", a parody of "Me So Horny" mocking Maury Povich (Jim Carrey) and Connie Chung's (Steve Park) attempts to conceive a child. Sometimes the person being made fun of in the song was not the original artist, as was the case in the parody of LL Cool J's "Mama Said Knock You Out" (Shawn Wayans impersonated Jimmie Walker, better known as J.J. Evans from the 1970s TV series Good Times) and Janet Jackson's "Rhythm Nation" (Kim Wayans portrayed Houston in that video).

=== O ===
- Oswald Bates – Damon Wayans plays an eloquent prison inmate whose vocabulary is full of malapropisms, more often than not misusing anatomical terms and words for bodily functions. "Unfortunately, we could not impregnate everyone. It is simply beyond our colonic threshold." "I believe it was Plato ... No, excuse me, I mean Play-Doh ... who stuck to the wall when he said one must not put one's transvestite in jeopardy if one is to become a cunning linguist".
- Overly Confident Gay Man – Jim Carrey portrays a gay man who recently came out of the closet, and wants everybody to know it.

=== P ===
- Richard Pryor – Damon Wayans impersonates Richard Pryor, specifically the exaggerated nervous energy he was known for in his comedies such as Superman III and The Toy, by showing Pryor in his kitchen preparing a bowl of cereal while expressing concern that something bad was about to happen. Pryor was making comments such as "Oh no!" and his known facial expressions when he was sent on a wild slapstick stunt. A narrator says "Richard Pryor is Scared for No Reason"!

=== S ===
- Seamus O'Shanty O'Shame (a.k.a. The Depressed Irish Singer) – In the fifth and final season, Jay Leggett was one of the only new cast players to be given the opportunity to provide a new regular character to the show. In his case, Seamus was somewhat of a white counterpart to David Alan Grier's "Calhoun Tubbs" character, whereas he would sing songs that had a shock value by the end of the song. Seamus O'Shanty O'Shame is a quintessential "rogue" Irish man with a heavy accent who sings with an acoustic guitar, usually in front of groups of people who are part of social service programs, but is later found out to be an escaped mental patient running from the facility in which he belongs. Unlike Calhoun Tubbs, Seamus' songs were not as short, nor did they have a catchy sendoff. Instead, Seamus would lead into his songs with an introduction (saying "... and it goes something like this ..."), start off his songs in a beautiful mood, and then conclude them with graphic depictions of injury and death, usually ending it off with "... and he died!" or "That's it!".
- Snackin' Shack – Kim Wayans plays an obnoxious, hard-of-hearing waitress at a greasy spoon diner, who refers to herself only as "Mama". Running gags included her giving patrons used water, serving contaminated food, pulling salt & pepper shakers or utensils out of her bra, and playfully spanking customers who misbehave. Luther the cook (Tommy Davidson), who is also hard of hearing, habitually prepares orders based on misheard conversations and sets them out with a yell of "Pick it up!" Leon (David Alan Grier) sits at a table by the door and shouts out bizarre non sequiturs; he appears to be only a customer, but he is actually the owner of the diner.
- Sweet Tooth Jones – A send-up of blaxploitation films; Tommy Davidson plays a karate instructor with a balding Afro haircut who runs the "Hollywood School of Self-Defense", assisted by Sugar Bear (Marc Wilmore) and Queen Bee (Alexandra Wentworth), all of whom wear clothing from and speak slang of the 1970s, completely out of place with the people they are instructing. Running gags would include simulated the fight to knock out his assistant, but never really knowing how to actually fight. As he put it, "I am a fight choreographer!"

=== T ===
- Tiny / Prison Cable Network – The prison sketches on In Living Color were never known by a particularly official name, but they always had a number of consistent inmates who bring their own unique personality – i.e., depraved mindset – to a television audience in the form of either a variety show or a game show. The regular inmates included Angel Martinez (Tommy Davidson)—a highly energetic, happy-go-lucky Chicano with a witty sense of humor who tends to be the host of all the televised events they have, Charlie Magic (Jim Carrey)—a crazy, murder-obsessed psychopath whose name derives from Charles Manson, and The Death Row Comic (Keenen Ivory Wayans), who was so dangerous, he always had to be isolated from the audience behind a steel door with only his mouth showing through a slide window at head level. The end of his routine always seemed to end with him being taken away to his execution (whimpering with fear in the process), however he appears at least three times total. The standout prison character is Tiny, a convicted rapist (played by David Alan Grier) who always begins his sentences with "Uhh ... uhh ..." and is insanely obsessed with women's breasts, always using the term "big breasteses" accordingly. Tiny's breast obsession is so intense that, even while he tries to keep it under control, the orgasmic thoughts of the "breasteses" tend to get the better of him to the point where the nearest people would have to try and calm him down or carry him away.

=== V ===
- Vera de Milo – Jim Carrey portrays a steroid-abusing female bodybuilder with a conspicuously flat chest and bulge in her posing trunks. Vera was best known by her unnaturally deep, breathy voice and grotesque, horselike laugh, along with a small set of pigtails. Vera de Milo often appeared in movie parodies of then-current films like Pretty Woman and The Hand That Rocks the Cradle.
- Velma Mulholland – Kelly Coffield is a woman who looks and acts in the style of film noir movies, earning her the nickname the "Film Noir Girl". As such, she always speaks in long hyperbole monologues. A physical characteristic is that she always appears in scratchy black and white, reminiscent of old film footage, while the world around her remains in color (an effect achieved through the use of chroma key, requiring Coffield to wear clothing and body paint of the same color with avoidance of the same color elsewhere on the set). A theme with each of her sketches is that she always finds herself in a situation involving a modern black man who is at odds over melodramatic takes on the most mundane of things.

=== W ===
- Wanda – Jamie Foxx portrays Wanda Wayne, the ugliest woman in the world...so ugly, in fact, that no one wanted to be in the same room as her (in one episode, Dracula exposed himself to sunlight to get away from her). She supposedly is the long lost member of the group En Vogue but left because she was taking all of the men. One of these helpless individuals is often Tommy Davidson. In the final season of In Living Color, Wanda had a child out of wedlock and searched for the father of her child Wanda Jr., which ended with her chasing after Barry Bonds' limo driver, who she believed was the father. Trademark phrase: "I'm gon' rock yo world," "I'm red' to go!," "Hey fo' real do," "I got you," and "Don't make me get ugly!"
- Why? – A series of public service announcement-themed sketches that asked a question that in and of itself was usually very intriguing, exemplified by the actors in an often exaggerated manner. For example, "Why do newscasters always attempt to sound ethnic when talking about stories dealing with Latinos? Why don't they do that with other ethnicities?" Another sketch, which lampooned Star Trek: The Next Generation, was then freeze framed into a "Why?" segment asking why black actors who play aliens on Star Trek look like they have feet or other body parts protruding from their heads, a likely reference to Worf.

== Notable one-time or infrequent sketches ==
- All Up in the Family – A black version of the 1970s CBS sitcom, All in the Family, which showed a black conservative Archie Bunker commenting on the ridiculousness of 1990s fads to his wife Edith.
- Bob Jackson, Karate Instructor – Jim Carrey plays a karate instructor, who claims to be a former world champion, teaching a self-defense class for women. He proceeds to get stabbed twice accidentally by Kelly Coffield while attempting to show how to defend against a knife attack, and is eventually unmasked as a fake by the other students in the class.
- The Buttmans – A family modeled after The Cosby Show characters, only they have buttocks on their foreheads. The Buttmans fail to see the jokes directed at their strange appearance. In one episode, their daughter brings home her boyfriend Richard Dickerson (Jim Carrey) who has a very long nose that resembles a penis; the family comments on interracial relationships, rather than the fact his nose is uniquely shaped.
- Cape Rear – A parody of the 1991 Cape Fear remake (starring Nick Nolte and Robert De Niro). This version focused on Arsenio Hall (Keenan Ivory Wayans) going to drastic measures to get close friend and fellow entertainer Eddie Murphy (Jamie Foxx) to appear on his hugely popular late-night talk show.
- The Capital Hillbillies – A parody of The Beverly Hillbillies with Bill Clinton, played by Jim Carrey.
- Career Aid – A parody of "We Are the World", with cast members mocking artists from the original song lamenting about their stardom passing them by. While Ray Charles is among the artists lampooned, it is David Alan Grier who plays the singer rather than Jamie Foxx, who would win an Academy Award for his portrayal of Charles in the film Ray. Foxx is Lionel Richie in the sketch.
- Chris Rock For Anonymous Express – Shawn Wayans portrays comic Chris Rock. In the sketch, the character of Chris Rock says white people do not recognize him on Saturday Night Live mistakes him for former SNL cast members Eddie Murphy and Damon Wayans. When a security guard (Jim Carrey) asks Rock to leave the NBC studios, Rock shows his I.D. and the guard says he has never appeared on Saturday Night Live and meets up with Garrett Morris (played by Jamie Foxx. Foxx portrayed Morris during the East Hollywood Squares sketches and later worked with him on The Jamie Foxx Show. While it's made out that Rock is the only cast member of color, SNL at the time had two other African-American featured players Tim Meadows and Ellen Cleghorne, who got her gig on SNL after appearing in two sketches in the second season). One future SNL alumna, Molly Shannon, briefly appears as one of the visitors. Wayans would later parody Rock again during the cold open of the 2000 MTV Video Music Awards in which he and his brother Marlon co-hosted.
- Cousin Elsee – Kim Wayans plays an annoying and unattractive woman who bothers everyone she meets. In an episode which showed a funeral, she appears saying that this is her fourth funeral today, and that the last funeral was catered by Taco Bell.
- Dickie Peterson: Cherub of Justice – Jim Carrey plays a Guardian Angels reject who attempts to protect local businesses (and, in one sketch, a visiting off-camera President of the United States), but who usually causes more harm than he prevents.
- Deboner 2000 – Carol Rosenthal plays Lorena Bobbitt in a mock knife infomercial where she is brutally chopping phallic looking food and related items (pants, boxer shorts, and a gamecock).
- Family Feud – The Jacksons face off against The Royal Family in a fictional episode of the game. Ray Combs, host of Family Feud at the time, is the emcee.
- Ghost II: Sammy's Visit – T'Keyah Keymah portrays Whoopi Goldberg (in character as Oda Mae Brown) in a spoof of the 1990 hit film Ghost and Tommy Davidson portraying Sammy Davis Jr., who comes back from Heaven, to reunite with his wife Altovise (Kim Wayans).
- Go On Girl – A feminism show hosted by Shawanda Harvey (T'Keyah Crystal Keymáh).
- Grace Jones – Kim Wayans parodies the actress as an extremely physical enthusiast of any activity (the sketch was not so much a spoof of Jones, but more so her characters Zula from the film Conan The Destroyer and May Day from the James Bond film A View to a Kill), whether be it fighting an alligator for her dinner or pro wrestling, while regularly asking "Do you find me sexy?". One parody involves the movie The Bodyguard in which Grace Jones plays the Whitney Houston character and Jim Carrey plays Kevin Costner complete with bad hair, and when Kevin Costner carries Whitney Houston off-stage in the original movie, the scene is reversed with Grace Jones carrying Frank Farmer off while singing "I Will Always Love You".
- Hawaii Five-O – Jim Carrey plays McGarrett in a parody of the long-running police drama.
- Hemorrhoid Patient – David Alan Grier is a patient who shows up at a hospital multiple times due to having a hemorrhoid and is constantly in the care of Nurse Peggy (Anne-Marie Johnson). He is usually placed on a gurney and temporarily left unattended while leaning forward with his gown undone, leaving his hemorrhoid exposed; because of this, many people look at it and are overwhelmed by its size and depiction. One group of people were Japanese tourists who stood next to the hemorrhoid and got their pictures taken with it. Others include rambunctious children prodding at it, a heart patient who laughed himself to death after seeing it, and was broadcast live for a local news channel. Cheap Pete (Chris Rock) makes a cameo and exclaims, "Good Lord, that's a might big hemorrhoid! Look like two ham hocks!". All the while, the patient gets upset when his hemorrhoid is seen and constantly calls for Nurse Peggy (who gradually becomes fed up with his complaints).
- Home Alone Again (fictional preview) – A send-up of both the hit film and star Macaulay Culkin's friendship with singer Michael Jackson. Jonathan Taylor Thomas plays Culkin, who plays various pranks on Jackson (Tommy Davidson) who wants to come in and play with Culkin. The pranks include shooting him in the crotch and burning his hand and hair (the latter being reminiscent of a real-life injury Jackson sustained while filming a Pepsi commercial in 1984).
- The Honeymooners '93 – A black and white parody of the 50s sitcom, but with the characters using hip-hop references. Ralph Kramden (Jay Leggett) enlists the help of a boombox-wielding Ed Norton (Jim Carrey) to learn how to be hip to impress his wife, Alice (Alexandra Wentworth). Examples include learning hip-hop dance moves, and trying to act black to relate to his boss (Tommy Davidson) to get a promotion at work.
- I Love Laquita – Kim Wayans plays the title character in this hip-hop flavored, but still black and white, spoof of the groundbreaking TV show I Love Lucy. Here, Ricky (Jim Carrey) has invited a famous producer over, and Laquita, along with Ethel (Kelly Coffield), hopes to audition for the producer, but soon they run into a case of mistaken identity when a TV repairman comes over before the producer does. Another notable instance of the sketch involved a case of mistaken identity with Keenen Ivory Wayans playing an escaped convict known as the "Billy Dee Williams Doppelganger Bandit" who robs Laquita's residence, but is suddenly stopped by an appearance of the real Williams.
- Juicemania – Jim Carrey plays a surprisingly accurate impersonation of infomercial personality Jay Kordich, who uses an electric juicer to make juice from unlikely sources, such as garbage and soil.
- King: The Early Years (one-time) – In a sketch introduced as part of a fictitious series of Great American Profiles, the narrator leads the audience to believe that Martin Luther King Jr. got his start as a peacemaker between boys preparing to fight in a schoolyard ... until "King" is revealed as a younger Don King (Damon Wayans), complete with his iconic hairdo, who promotes the fight and even instigates it. Obviously anachronistic references are also made to boxers Leon Spinks and Gerry Cooney, as well as Robin Givens, ex-wife of Mike Tyson.
- Kurt Singen – Jim Carrey plays a flamboyant environmentalist who is offended by everything he sees. He bears a passing resemblance to Freddie Mercury. At the end of the sketch, either he would be arrested for disturbing the peace or his moped would be stolen, which he would react to by saying "People, we must work together!"
- Lamont Hightower – (David Alan Grier) A flamboyant host presents televised events and programs celebrating black underachievement and the perpetuation of stereotypes, for example television awards for typecast characters such as "sassy neighbors" and "scared brothers on police shows". Another time Lamost hosted a "Miss Black USA" pageant hosted by a ghetto area of an unnamed city.
- Lassie '90 – A mother (Kelly Coffield) and her son (James Carrey) own a pit bull. When they get into trouble they ask their faithful companion to get them something needed to extricate themselves from the situation. The dog soon returns with the desired item, albeit still held by the severed arm of the original owner.
- The Last Orphan – David portrays a 35-year-old orphan, who never was adopted. He reveals that he is a graduate of the Yale University Acting School. When a couple tells him he is crazy, he comments "My ex-wife told me the same thing", indicating that he has adjusted to adult life but somehow feels his life is incomplete because he grew up without parents.
- Late Night with Mike Tyson – The boxer (Keenen Ivory Wayans) hosts a late-night talk show with Don King (Jamie Foxx) as his sidekick. Elements from The Tonight Show Starring Johnny Carson, Late Night with David Letterman and The Arsenio Hall Show are incorporated into the sketch.
- Lil' Magic – Features Kim Wayans as a very tall girl without talent who always auditions for talent shows, accompanied by her overzealous stage mother, played by David Alan Grier (who is not much in drag as he retains his normal voice and does not wear makeup, which added to the comedy). Her common phrase was "I'm Miss Smile Bright 1987!" Then she makes a big smile. On certain occasions where she did achieve moderate success, she would revel in the newfound wealth with comments such as "Gee, Mama, maybe you can get the liposuction for your butt!" or "Gosh, Mama, maybe now you can get that other breast implant!", prompting the stage mother to reply "Lil' Magic, shut up!"
- Lil' Richard's Playhouse – Keenan Ivory Wayans portrays rock n' roll singer Little Richard as he hosts a storytime program. In the sketch, he attempts to tell the story of Cinderella, but he makes too many connections to himself that he stops reading and talks about the things he has not accomplished yet, such as not winning a Grammy yet.
- Love Connection – Jim Carrey portrays host Chuck Woolery, Kim Coles portrays Robin Givens, and Keenen Ivory Wayans portrays Mike Tyson in a parody of the television series of the same name. This is the very first aired sketch. In the second and final sketch, Kelly Coffield portrayed her character, Andrea Dice Clay while Jim Carrey played Patrick Swayze.
- Magenta Thompson: Acting Teacher – Kelly Coffield plays a middle-aged, semi-oblivious former actress who has taken up teaching the art of acting. In her classes, Magenta gives her all when demonstrating her acting abilities and her strong passion for the profession. However, she doesn't seem completely bothered that she was no more than a bit-part supporting actress who was always met with the line "Outta my way, bitch!" in every movie she appeared in, all of which she delights in showing to her students.
- Making of a Tracy Chapman Song – Tracy Chapman (Kim Wayans) promises her producer she will have a song written by the next day. For inspiration, she looks out the window and incorporates events like an old man getting hit by a bus and a domestic dispute into her new song, which is set to the tune of Chapman's hit "Fast Car".
- Misery II – A pseudosequel to Stephen King's Misery, where a woman is chained to her bed by Rick James (played by Keenan Ivory Wayans) who claims that "there's a party in my pants". When the woman tries to reason with him by saying that she liked MC Hammer's sample of Superfreak, it causes an enraged James to make the sophomoric comment "M.C. Hammer ain't nothing but a stinky pants doody!" In tribute to Misery's infamous sledgehammer scene, James returns with a hammer, saying "It is hammer time!", and the narrator comments "He is one funked-up host".
- Mr. Armstrong – Reggie McFadden plays a substitute teacher named Mr. Armstrong, who has two useless arms, one of which is limp, teaches a group of students who torment him by compelling him to perform various tasks with his useless, limp arm such as writing on the chalk board, pointing to places on a map, and covering his heart for the Pledge of Allegiance. Mr. Armstrong eventually snaps, saying "You little trouble makers, I didn't want to have to show you this side of me, but you forced my hand," before using his limp arm to karate chop his desk in half, subduing the students into good behavior. This was a frequent sketch in the fifth and final season.
- Naganawanaland – Kelly Coffield plays a newly appointed U.S. ambassador to an obscure African nation, while David Alan Grier plays her interpreter whose translations do not quite match up to what the new ambassador is actually saying.
- The New Fly Girls – On 12 May 1991 broadcast, in the opening dance routine right after the credits, Kim Wayans, T'Keyah Keymah, and Kelly Coffield are shown dancing rather than the strangely absent Fly Girls. At the end of the dance routine, the girls nervously back up against the closet on the set's mock rooftop. Suddenly the closet bursts open, and it is revealed that the female cast members tied up the Fly Girls, duct taped their mouths shut, and stuffed them into the closet. Kim, T'Keyah, and Kelly look distressed, until T'Keyah shouts for the DJ to keep playing the song. The three girls finish their dance routine while the bound and gagged Fly Girls struggle to free themselves and (attempt to) shout for help. It appears that not all the Fly Girls were fully prepared for the sketch, because when the closet door opens and they all fall out onto the floor, you can see several Fly Girls still wrapping themselves in the rope or putting the pieces of tape over their mouths.
- Old Train – A parody of the music show Soul Train with Keenan Ivory Wayans as an elderly version of Don Cornelius. During the show's famous "Soul Train Line", some of the dancers include someone in a wheelchair, and pallbearers rolling a casket down the line. In the closing of the sketch, the "Grim Reaper" walks throughout the crowd.
- Passenger 227 – Parody of the 1992 movie, Passenger 57, T'Keyah Keymáh portrays Jackée as Sandra from 227, in which the sketch focuses as Sandra, the Airline Security with other people being trapped with airline terrorists.
- Pee-wee's Adult Adventure – Pee-wee Herman (as portrayed by Jim Carrey) shills the new Pee-wee doll, updated with references to Paul Reubens' 1991 arrest for masturbating in a Florida theater.
- Player's Club - Parody of the Player's Club Service, as advertised by Players International. Jim Carrey plays Telly Savalas, known for his commercial advertisements of the Player's Club; however, the Player's Club is now an actual club which Carrey uses to attack staff members at hotels and casinos when they do not offer first class accommodations or front row seats at entertainment shows.
- Ross Perot – Jim Carrey parodies Ross Perot by showing a program to the people of the NAACP a program acronymed SLAVE (Service Labor Asset Valuable Expenses) on the first episode of the fourth season. Another had Perot buying up airtime on all the channels and appearing in each one, until when the sketch ends and the usual showing of the Fly Girls dancing, Ross Perot is now the DJ of In Living Color.
- Seamus O'Shanty O'Shame – Jay Leggett, who was cast strictly in the fifth and final season, plays an Irish singer whose songs each begin with traditional, uplifting lyrics, but end with graphic lyrics, usually involving death or destruction. Each of his songs ends suddenly with "That's it!" It turns out that Seamus is a mental patient when two men in white uniforms arrive to capture him.
- Sgt. Stacey Koon – Jim Carrey plays a parody of a sergeant in the LA Police Department in the Rodney King incident, who spits when he speaks.
- Sheila Peace – Kelly Coffield plays a woman who has a very stereotyped view of everyone she meets. In one sketch, she plays a realtor attempting to sell an apartment to an Asian couple, telling them the hard wood floors were good for them to practice karate on. When trying to sell the same apartment to an Indian man, she told him there was plenty of room for all his wives to come in and belly dance.
- Snuf & Roam – (Shawn and Marlon Wayans) A pair of immature brothers talk tough, but invariably get put in their place. One sketch dealt with them trying to hit on girls at a club, which Snuf says his full name is Snuffleupagus. Another had the brothers thrown in jail and trying to act tough in front of the other prisoners, only to later find out they were arrested for sneaking into the film Pinocchio without paying.
- Star Trek: The Wrath of Farrakhan – In this spoof of the original Star Trek series and the film Star Trek II: The Wrath of Khan, Jim Carrey impersonates Captain Kirk with grossly exaggerated mannerisms, with David Alan Grier playing Mr. Spock and Kim Wayans as Lt. Uhura. Minister Louis Farrakhan (Damon Wayans) boards the Enterprise and convinces the minority and alien crew members to mutiny, becomes captain, and directs the Enterprise to 125th Street in Harlem, New York to Sylvia's Soul Food Shack.
- Ted Turner's Very Colorized Classics – Jim Carrey portrays film enthusiast Turner, only instead of colorizing black and white films, he replaces the white stars of those films with black actors. For example, one sketch replaces Humphrey Bogart with Billy Dee Williams (Keenan Ivory Wayans) in Casablanca.
- Three Champs and a Baby/Little Lady – Muhammad Ali (David Alan Grier), Sugar Ray Leonard (Tommy Davidson) and Mike Tyson (Keenan Ivory Wayans) care for a baby girl (a teenage girl in the "Little Lady" version). Tyson peppers his conversation with the words "ecstatic" and "ludicrous", and is punched by Ali whenever the doorbell (actually a boxing ring bell) is rung. Ali was shown having trouble speaking clearly, often saying sentences like "Float like a butter, stink like a tree", a likely reference to his issues with Parkinson's disease. Another skit where they were featured where the three champs appeared in fruit costumes, saying "We are the Fruit of the Loom boxers!"
- Timbuk: The Last Runaway Slave – Damon Wayans plays the descendant of cave-dwelling runaway slaves, unaware of changes in the world around him since the 1860s. Before his "Pappy", who raised three generations of runaway slaves, passes away, he tells Timbuk it is time to leave the cave. After exiting the cave Timbuk encounters a businessman (David Alan Grier) who he thinks is a "free black". A white jogger running by bumps into the businessman. Timbuk immediately apologizes while the businessman stands up to the jogger and the two exchange words. Timbuck grabs the businessman telling him white folk like to be right even if they are wrong. The jogger leaves and a few moments later dogs are heard barking. Timbuk grabs the businessman and goes behind a bush. A white woman with two small dogs walks by. Timbuk tells the businessman to stop staring at her as she walks away. The businessman tells him he can have a white woman if he so desires. The jogger returns with police to take the businessman away due to the earlier altercation. Timbuk throws himself down full force on the ground begging for mercy. When the police tell Timbuk he is not under arrest and is free to go, he believes he has been freed. The skit ended with a cliffhanger that was never resolved.
- Umbilical Barry – Jim Carrey plays a young college age kid still attached to his overprotective mother (Carol Rosenthal playing the stereotype of the Jewish mother) literally by the umbilical cord.
- Unpoetic Justice – T'Keyah Crystal Keymah portrays R&B/Pop singer Janet Jackson, Jamie Foxx as rapper Tupac Shakur, and Anne-Marie Johnson as Regina King, in the popular 1993 film, Poetic Justice. This dubious parody reenacts scenes from the film, such as Janet and Tupac's verbally abusive arguing, and mostly voice-overs done by Janet Jackson, who has been scolded by Tupac, by never "bein' in the 'hood".
- Vortex of Fear – A take-off on The Twilight Zone, with Tommy Davidson as the Rod Serling-esque narrator. In the sketch, a man (Jim Carrey) is hypnotized so that he clucks like a chicken. Before the hypnotism can be reversed, the hypnotist (David Alan Grier) suddenly drops dead. Unable to communicate normally (even his writing consists of clucks), the man ends up homeless.
- Vortex 2 – A parody of tampon commercials with Kelly Coffield and Kim Coles sunbathing at a swimming pool. Coffield tells Coles that she would like to take a swim, but that her period prevents her from doing so. After using Vortex 2 at Coles' suggestion, Coffield returns and dives into the pool, causing the water in the pool to vanish.
- Wile E Coyote - Jamie Foxx portrays a jaded parody of Wile E Coyote (who insists on being called "Willy" Coyote) who is vocally and visibly tired of being a cartoon character. Jay Leggett also appears in these sketches as another Looney Tunes character (either Elmer Fudd or Yosemite Sam).

== Bolt 45, The Lost Sketch ==
- On 5 May 1990 broadcast, Keenen Ivory Wayans did a take-off on a Billy Dee Williams "Colt 45" commercial (in which the purpose of the beverage is to get your lady friend wasted) that ended with a woman (played by Kim Coles) passed out on her back on a dining table, and "Billy Dee" moving in on her unconscious body to have sex with her. The "Bolt 45" sketch was seen only once during the original broadcast. The sketch was omitted from repeats because some felt it was making light of date rape. The Season One DVD set of ILC did not include the "cut" sketch from the pilot. This skit was cut by Fox censors, and the necessary modifications were made to the master tape, but the masters were mixed up and the original version of the episode was broadcast. That segment has never been broadcast since, not even in syndication or on FX or BET. It has been replaced by The Exxxon Family (a fake promo for a sitcom about a clumsy Exxon boat captain (played by Jim Carrey)) in syndication and DVD Box Sets.
