= 2006 Webby Awards =

US internet awards ceremony

The 10th annual 2006 Webby Awards were held on June 12, 2006, at the Cipriani Hotel in New York City and were hosted by the comedian Jon Stewart. Judging was provided by the 500-person International Academy of Digital Arts and Sciences, and winners were selected from among 5,500 entries from around 40 countries worldwide. This award ceremony saw the creation of a new award category, "Best Viral Video".

== Nominees and winners ==
(from http://www.webbyawards.com/winners/2006)

Category	Webby Award winner	People's Voice winner	Other nominees
Best Use of Animation or Motion Graphics	Bebop Jeans (Archived 13 June 2006 via Wayback); White Noise	DreamStudioDesign (Archived 12 June 2006 via Wayback); DSD Animations	KangaROOS UK (Archived 15 June 2006 via Wayback); Pod1
Best Use of Animation or Motion Graphics	Bebop Jeans (Archived 13 June 2006 via Wayback); White Noise	DreamStudioDesign (Archived 12 June 2006 via Wayback); DSD Animations	Survival of the Phatest (Archived 27 June 2006 via Wayback); Clemenger BBDO
Best Use of Animation or Motion Graphics	Bebop Jeans (Archived 13 June 2006 via Wayback); White Noise	DreamStudioDesign (Archived 12 June 2006 via Wayback); DSD Animations	Weird TV (Archived 12 June 2006 via Wayback); Eat.tv, Inc.
Best Game	Stackopolis (Archived 13 June 2006 via Wayback); Bloc Media	Miniclip (Archived 11 June 2006 via Wayback); Miniclip Ltd	Protokid (Archived 12 June 2006 via Wayback); Bloc Media
Best Game	Stackopolis (Archived 13 June 2006 via Wayback); Bloc Media	Miniclip (Archived 11 June 2006 via Wayback); Miniclip Ltd	Star Wars Galaxies (Archived 11 June 2006 via Wayback); Sony Online Entertainment
Best Game	Stackopolis (Archived 13 June 2006 via Wayback); Bloc Media	Miniclip (Archived 11 June 2006 via Wayback); Miniclip Ltd	Toontown Online (Archived 12 June 2006 via Wayback); Walt Disney Internet Group
Best Game-Related	Gamasutra (Archived 11 June 2006 via Wayback); CMP Game Group	GameSpot (Archived 11 June 2006 via Wayback); CNET Networks	GameSpy (Archived 14 June 2006 via Wayback); IGN Entertainment
Best Game-Related	Gamasutra (Archived 11 June 2006 via Wayback); CMP Game Group	GameSpot (Archived 11 June 2006 via Wayback); CNET Networks	Metacritic.com (Archived 13 June 2006 via Wayback); Metacritic
Best Game-Related	Gamasutra (Archived 11 June 2006 via Wayback); CMP Game Group	GameSpot (Archived 11 June 2006 via Wayback); CNET Networks	MobyGames (Archived 12 June 2006 via Wayback); MobyGames
Best Humor	The Onion Behavior		McSweeney's Internet Tendency McSweeney's
Best Humor	The Onion Behavior		The League of Thinning Men Terabyte Interactive
Best Humor	The Onion Behavior		The Smoking Gun Court TV News
Best Humor	The Onion Behavior		Weird TV eat.tv, inc.
Best Weird	Snopes.com BURST! Media		beastblender.com Carmichael Lynch
Best Weird	Snopes.com BURST! Media		Boneless Pig Farmers Association Of America Moroch
Best Weird	Snopes.com BURST! Media		Car Stuck Girls Swen Goebbels
Best Weird	Snopes.com BURST! Media		Weird TV Eat.tv, Inc.
Websites and Mobile Sites Charitable Organizations/Non-Profit	Sandy Rowley Official website https://renowebdesigner.com Mega Star Media INC		DeafAfrica.org Boedai.com
Best Home/Welcome Page	Remember Segregation (Archived 12 April 2006 via Wayback); DDB Seattle	My Yahoo! Yahoo!	Free Style Livin' (Archived 5 April 2006 via Wayback); Target
Best Home/Welcome Page	Remember Segregation (Archived 12 April 2006 via Wayback); DDB Seattle	My Yahoo! Yahoo!	Krups USA (Archived 11 April 2006 via Wayback); Business Interactive
Best Home/Welcome Page	Remember Segregation (Archived 12 April 2006 via Wayback); DDB Seattle	My Yahoo! Yahoo!	Wonderbra - Experience Wonder You (Archived 12 April 2006 via Wayback); Publicis Net
This table is not complete, please help to complete it from material on this page.
