= MP3+G =

MP3+G (MP3 plus Graphics) is a karaoke file format that was created to allow CD+G karaoke to be played from a personal computer easily and quickly. MP3+G was created from the combination of the MP3 audio file (the CD audio is converted and compressed to MP3) and a raw CDG file which contains the RW subchannels from the CD+G track.

== History ==
MP3+G was first called MM+G in combination of various audio formats synchronized to a CDG file. MP3 and WMA became the most popular audio format used for karaoke and therefore MP3+G and WMA+G became the most popular formats used. Microsoft first unofficially adopted the WMA+G for use on the Xbox for the Xbox karaoke product.

MP3+G was named in 1998 as the media format for WinCDG which was the first MP3+G player. The technology was intended as the new standard for PC karaoke without the need for a disc.

Other products have found a new way to transport the MP3+G pair of files by "zipping" them. A zip file is a data compression format used to compress and contain files together. Containing the MP3+G file pair in the ZIP became known as an "MP3+G Zipped".

Since the creation of the format the technology of MP3+G was first licensed as the Breeze engine by Tricerasoft. It was later released as a codec engine technology to various computer software companies, including TouchPoint, PCDJ, DJPower, Alcatech, Hercules, and AVA Systems.

== Design ==
MP3+G is derived from the CD+G format and the CD+G disc format invented by Philips. MP3+G is created by extracting the CD-Audio packets from the CD+G disc with a CD-ROM drive that is capable of also extracting the RW channels from the disc. The digital audio portion is compressed to MP3 and the RW Channels (CD+G graphics) are stored to a CDG file. The player products read each file and synchronize the information to display the interpreted graphics along with the music.

== See also ==
- Compact disc
- CD+G
- LRC (file format)
