= Eat or Be Eaten (album) =

Studio album by The Firesign Theatre
- Released: 1985
- Genre: Comedy
- Length: 32:02
- Label: Mercury

The Firesign Theatre chronology
The Three Faces of Al (1984)	Eat or Be Eaten (1985)	Shoes for Industry: The Best of the Firesign Theatre (1993)

Eat or Be Eaten is the seventeenth comedy album by the Firesign Theatre, released on Mercury Records in 1985. Original Firesign Theatre member David Ossman did not appear on this album; Laura Quinn provided the voice of VJ Hawkmoth.

The CD includes images encoded in CD+G format.

== Track listing ==
- Album:
1. "Getting In" - 16:00
2. "Getting Out" - 16:00
- CD:
1. "Headball Classic" - 1:33
2. "Wimpy's Software" - 1:51
3. "Kamikaze Recall" - 0:53
4. "Entering Labyrinth" - 1:16
5. "Chi-Chi" - 0:19
6. "Johnny Piano" - 2:32
7. "The National Toilet" - 0:59
8. "Welcome To Barberia" - 1:58
9. "Shoplifters Market" - 1:05
10. "Neighborhood Survival Gunstore" - 1:58
11. "Getting In" - 1:39
12. "Bait And Switch" - 2:46
13. "Police Problems" - 2:28
14. "Dylan At The Met" - 0:45
15. "Art Snob" - 1:07
16. "Eat Or Be Eaten" - 3:21
17. "Tonto's Cowboy Bank" - 1:48
18. "Getting Out" 3:33
