= Weird TV =

- Also known as: Weird Television
- Genre: Syndicated Television Program
- Created by: Chuck Cirino, Todd Stevens, Arthur Maturo
- Written by: Eric Trueheart, David Floyd, Dave Nichols, Shadoe Stevens
- Directed by: Chuck Cirino, Paul Marshal
- Starring: Skylaire Alfvegren, Franklin Ruehl and Eric Trueheart
- Voices of: Shadoe Stevens
- Theme music composer: Chuck Cirino
- Composers: Shark Bait, Tinfed, Chuck Cirino
- Country of origin: United States
- Original language: English

Production
- Executive producers: Chuck Cirino, Todd Stevens, Arthur Maturo, Dewey Reid
- Producer: Alexia Cirino
- Editors: Chuck Cirino, Paul Marshal
- Running time: 1hr
- Production company: Weird TV Inc.

Original release
- Network: Fox
- Release: 1995 – 1996

Related
- "Weird TV" (2003)

Weird TV, or Weird Television, is a surreal variety television show that aired in 1995 on Canadian late-night TV, as well as American stations such as KCOP, Channel 13 in Los Angeles; KTZZ (now KZJO), Channel 22 in Seattle, and Columbus, Ga. NBC affiliate WLTZ, Channel 38.

== Premise ==
The "host" of the show was Chuck Cirino, who was also one of the show's executive producers along with Todd Stevens (who also produced the hit show Friends) and Arthur Maturo.

Cirino was the one constant of every show. He appeared in a landcruiser to set up new segments of the show. The subtitles in these segments refer to Cirino as the "comfort zone" of the show.

Also included in the program were clips Cirino had filmed from the Burning Man festival.

Segments include:

- Weird America, a segment of the show in which the crew flies out to unusual events all across the country. For example, "Car Hunt", where a full-sized, remote-controlled car is let loose in the Nevada desert and is hunted down with high-powered weapons, "just like big game", according to Cirino.
- Shadoevision, a continuing science-fiction thriller hosted by Shadoe Stevens.
- The Dr. Ruehl show, where noted "phenomenologist" Dr. Franklin Ruehl talks about viewers of the latest cases of strange phenomena.
- Video Dave's UFO Clip of the Week, where Dave Aaron reports on the latest extraterrestrial sightings from around the world.
- Newsweird, which features strange news from around the globe.
- Weird music videos, such as those for Monster Magnet's Negasonic Teenage Warhead and Skunk Anansie's Selling Jesus.

Another segment of the show includes stand-alone video pieces that are produced specifically for the show, as well as other video pieces sent in by viewers themselves.

These include:

- Zatar the Mutant King, played by David Floyd. Zatar wears a dark cloak and a pair of heavy goggles. He carries "his sugar" with him at all times. Because his mother consumed too much sugar during her pregnancy, he was born with the power to mutate at will, defeating his enemies by becoming his enemies.
- Trash: Francis & Buzz – Two deformed hand puppets converse.
- Weird Love – A man discovers that his girlfriend is a were–caterpillar
- Mobius in the world of the Living Dead
- Babe in a Bottle(subtitled) – A tiny woman and a doctor.
- Limbo Lounge - Sammy Davis Jr., Sulu and a transvestite perform a night club act.
- Hog Man's Pork n' Bean Emporium – A strange man sells pork n' beans from a drive-up window.

== Controversy ==
The show was banned in Philadelphia and Wisconsin for broadcasting a stop-motion animated short about a squirrel defecating massively.

== Awards ==
- The shows (now defunct) website www.weird.tv was nominated for 3 Webby Awards in 2006, under the categories of Best Humor, Best Use of Animation or Graphics and Best Weird.
