= Meizu M3 Music Card =

M3 Music Card
- Manufacturer: Meizu
- Type: Digital audio player Portable media player
- Lifespan: since 2007
- Memory: Flash memory
- Storage: 2 / 4 / 8 GB internal flash memory
- Display: 1.5 in, 176x132 px
- Connectivity: USB 2.0
- Dimensions: 81 x 39 x 6.9 mm
- Weight: 42 g

The Meizu M3 Music Card is an portable media player designed and marketed by Meizu, the Chinese-based consumer electronics manufacturer. It is 42 grams (0.09 lb) in weight and features an 1.5-inch LED-backlit LCD display.

The M3 supports playback of audio files in the MP3, WMA, WAV, FLAC and OGG formats, and video playback at up to 25FPS. Also included is an FM tuner, voice recorder, calendar, stopwatch, calculator, and games.

The shiny metal back of the older M6 Mini Players is gone – the M3 comes with a smooth black metal finish on the back cover. According to the manufacturer, the player has around 20 hours of battery life with regular use.

The player costs 499/599/850 CNY (65/80/110 USD) for the 2/4/8 GB models respectively.

There have been rumors since late spring 2007 that a slightly modified M3 (shorter body, smaller battery, brushed metal finish, modified back/forward button) will be presented. In August 2007 information was available that the presentation of the new M3SE will be postponed due to Meizu's focus on the new 'M8 MiniOne' and the M6 second edition.

== See also ==
- Meizu
- M6 Mini Player
