= Meizu M6 miniPlayer =

Flash-based portable media player

Meizu M6 Mini Player
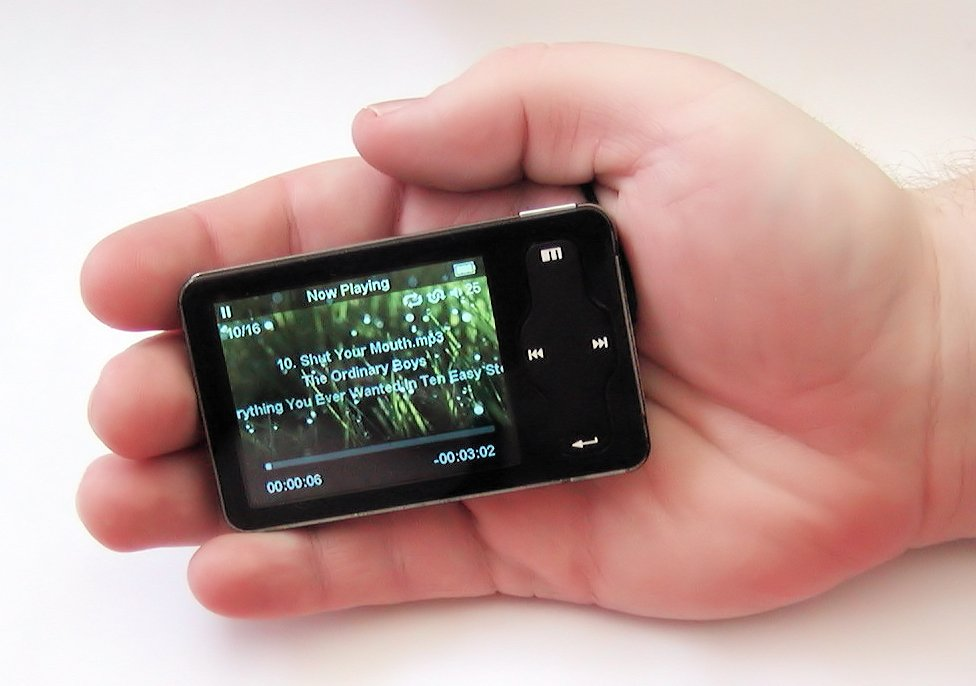
- Manufacturer: Meizu
- Type: Digital audio player Portable media player
- Lifespan: 2006
- Storage: 4 GB, 8 GB (two 4 GB chips), internal Flash memory
- Display: 2.4 (2.41 SL ver.) inches, 320×240 pixel resolution
- Connectivity: USB
- Dimensions: TP/SP: 79 mm × 48.2 mm × 10 SL: 79 mm × 48.2 mm × 7
- Weight: 53 grams

The M6 miniPlayer, from Meizu, was a flash-based portable media player released in the 2000s. It played audio files in MP3, WMA, WAV, FLAC, APE and Ogg and plays AVI video playback (using the XVID codec) on a 2.4-inch QVGA screen. The Mini Player included an FM tuner, voice recorder, calendar, stopwatch, calculator, a basic ebook reader for TXT files, and two games.

== History ==
The M6 was from Meizu's digital audio player group. Accordingly, it was available only in certain parts of the world including the United States, Australia, France, Russia and more. Though the M6 supports many audio formats, the US release did not support MP3s because of licensing issues. Apparently, workarounds are available using specific firmware upgrades.

Dane-Elec formed a deal with Meizu to distribute the M6, apparently resolving MP3 licensing issues. Many European models distributed by Dane‐Elec had disabled FM tuners because of EU import duties; this could also be remedied by a firmware update.

Jasmine France rated the M6 as a quality alternative to the iPod Nano. It was praised for its aesthetics. One characteristic is its ability to function without proprietary file formats and procedures. The big criticisms of the device were its touch pad controls, overcrowded menus, and alphabetic song ordering instead of using track order.

== Specifications ==
The following are some of the more important specifications regarding the Meizu M6:

Capacity	1 GB (no longer produced), 2 GB, 4 GB, 8 GB (two 4 GB chips) flash memory
Size	79 mm × 48.2 mm × 10 mm
Display	2.4 inch, 260‐thousand color QVGA, 320×240 pixel resolution TFT‐LCD screen
Weight	55 grams
Audio	supports MP3, WMA, WAV, Ogg, FLAC, WMA lossless, APE
Video	AVI format (Xvid) at up to 20 FPS and 384 to 512 kilobits per second
Photo	BMP, JPEG, GIF
Battery	rechargeable lithium-ion battery; rated at 20 hours audio playback and 6 hours video playback

== Software ==
=== File transfer ===
The M6 connected to a computer via a USB 2.0 cable, which typically recognized it as a mass storage device (starting with the 2.00x firmware series MTP is also supported). Transferring media files and firmware upgrades is accomplished by dragging and dropping. No proprietary software is needed, allowing it to be a true cross-platform media player. The Linux 2.6 kernel driver for UMS devices works with the M6.

=== Video conversion ===
For converting videos to the required Xvid format, Meizu provides a custom version of VirtualDub. A Meizu profile is available for open source program, Iriverter, and Batman Video Converter is available. Mac users can convert with MPEG Streamclip video converter.

== Customization and variants ==
The miniPlayer allows the user to change a few display items such as the background image and font color. Unofficially, it is possible to modify the RESOURCE.BIN file to skin the player with different icons. A number of stick‐on covers are available which allow the front surface and thumb pad to be colored.

The two original versions of the miniPlayer were:

- The TP version has a Toshiba screen with better color reproduction at the cost of lower brightness. It is 2 mm shallower.
- The SP version has a brighter and slightly cheaper Samsung screen.

The two versions have different firmware and the screen does not work if the wrong one is loaded. The RESOURCE.BIN files are the same, however.

The SP edition has a black matte back metal plate, instead of shiny metal.

=== M6SL and M6SE ===
A slimmer version of the miniPlayer, named Meizu M6SL (M6 "slim"), was released at the end of September 2007. The main difference from the original edition is the decreased thickness—7 mm (like the M3 Music Card) instead of 10 mm and new, better quality, Wolfson produced DACs.

== See also ==
- Meizu
