= Homey D. Clown (video game) =

1993 video game

- Developer: Synergistic Software
- Publisher: Capstone Software
- Director: Robert C. Clardy
- Producers: Leigh M. Rothschild; David Turner; Robert Herrick
- Artists: Jeremy Jones; Jerry Speed; Jonathan Sposato; Linda Westerfield
- Writers: Robert C. Clardy; Jeremy Jones
- Composer: Chris Barker
- Platform: MS-DOS
- Release: 1993
- Mode: Single-player

Homey D. Clown is a video game developed by Synergistic Software for MS-DOS. It was published in 1993 by Capstone Software.

== Plot ==
Homey D. Clown is based on the character Homey D. Clown from In Living Color.

== Reception ==
In 1996, Computer Gaming World declared Homey D. Clown the fifth-worst computer game ever released. In 2020, commenting on its inclusion in the speedrunning charity event Summer Games Done Quick, Ars Technica described the game's music and sound effects as "easily some of the worst ever committed to a hard drive".

== Legacy ==
One of the most popular characters in the show's history, Homey was the only In Living Color character to get his own video game.
