= Frank Caliendo =

American comedian, actor and impressionist

Frank Caliendo Jr.
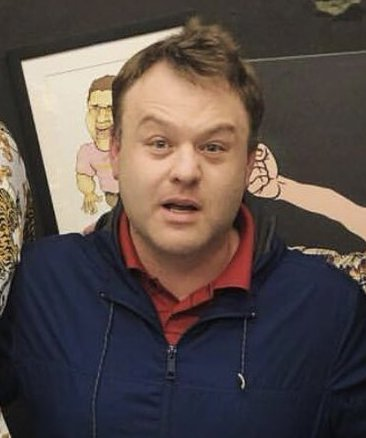
- Caliendo in 2019
- Born: Frank Caliendo Jr. January 19, 1974 (age 52); Chicago, Illinois, U.S.
- Notable work: Frank TV; Fox NFL Sunday
- Spouse: Michele Vitale (m. 2003)
- Children: Joe, Juliet

Comedy career
- Years active: 2000–present
- Medium: Stand-up comedy, television, burlesque
- Genre: Observational comedy
- Subjects: Impersonations, popular culture
- Website: www.frankcaliendo.com

Frank Caliendo Jr. (born January 19, 1974) is an American comedian, actor, and impressionist best known for his impersonations on the Fox Network television series MADtv as well as being the in-house prognosticator for Fox NFL Sunday. In 2007 and 2008, he performed impersonations on his own show, Frank TV, which aired on TBS.

He is known for his impressions and for his frequent appearances on The Bob & Tom Show. He has released six solo CDs. From 2009 to 2011 he had a show at the Monte Carlo Resort and Casino in Las Vegas.

== Early life and education ==
Caliendo was born in Chicago and grew up in Waukesha, Wisconsin, where he attended Waukesha South High School. He is of Italian descent. Before he graduated from University of Wisconsin–Milwaukee, Caliendo began performing stand-up comedy at local night clubs and comedy clubs, he eventually became a master of ceremonies at a local comedy club. Within a few years, he was active on the college circuit. Between 2000 and 2001, Caliendo made his television debut on Hype, a sketch comedy series and later joined the comedy series MADtv.

== Career ==
Caliendo has performed stand-up on Premium Blend, Late Show with David Letterman, Late Late Show with Craig Kilborn, The View, The Late Late Show with Craig Ferguson, and Late Night with Conan O'Brien.

Caliendo has done a John Madden impression on Fox NFL Sunday, The Best Damn Sports Show Period and Mohr Sports. Caliendo has also appeared on Comedy Central's Comedy Central Presents, as well as the radio shows The Free Beer and Hot Wings Show, Randy Baumann and the DVE Morning Show, The Dan Le Batard Show, The Dan Patrick Show, The Junkies, Bob & Sheri, The Bob & Tom Show, Mike and Mike in the Morning, Opie and Anthony, The Detroit Cast, The Don and Mike Show, Rise Guys, Bubba the Love Sponge, The John Boy and Billy Big Show, The Howard Stern Show, Mike and the Mad Dog, Elliot in the Morning, The Sports Inferno, The Rick and Bubba Show, The Roe Conn Show, Pardon My Take, The 105.7 WAPL Rick and Len Show, Preston and Steve, Bob and Brian, The Glenn Beck Program, Holmberg's Morning Sickness on 98 KUPD in Phoenix, Dunham and Miller Show in Dallas/Ft. Worth, and Lamont & Tonelli on 107.7 The Bone in San Francisco.

From 2001 to 2004, he also made appearances on the KQ Morning Show's annual "Live from Las Vegas" simulcast, appearing on the panel throughout the show and reprising a few bits from his stand-up act. He has appeared on Garage Logic with Joe Soucheray; co-host Matt "Rookie" Michalski's has done various impersonations.

=== Fox NFL Sunday ===
On November 5, 2000, Caliendo appeared on Fox NFL Sunday; he returned again the same season on January 7 during the playoffs. In 2001 and 2002, Caliendo returned as a semi-regular guest. In 2003, Caliendo joined Fox NFL Sunday as a regular cast member, giving his predictions for the day's NFL games.

On August 2, 2012, Caliendo announced he would not be on Fox NFL Sunday for the 2012 season; he was replaced by Rob Riggle.

=== MADtv ===
Caliendo officially joined the cast of MADtv in 2001 as a repertory performer, for the seventh season. In 2002, Caliendo replaced Will Sasso on the show as the impersonator of George W. Bush. Caliendo also was the announcer for the best of scenes on the MADtv season 1 DVD. Caliendo left MADtv before the 2006–2007 season.

=== Frank TV ===
Caliendo starred on Frank TV, his own sketch show on the TBS that began airing in November 2007. Caliendo was its host and performed in sketches impersonating various celebrities.

In early 2008, TBS announced that they ordered eight more episodes, which ran later that year.

=== Other appearances ===
Caliendo's impression of President George W. Bush earned him an invitation to perform during the 2006 annual Radio-Television Correspondents Dinner. Caliendo appeared in the 2007 film The Comebacks as "Chip Imitation" who impersonates John Madden and Al Michaels in the championship game.

During The Comedy Festival Caliendo hosted a special called The Comedy Festival Presents: Funniest Movies of the Year 2008; from Caesars Palace, he introduced the top ten list for funniest films of 2008 based on an Internet poll.

== Personal life ==
Caliendo lives in Tempe, Arizona with his wife Michelle and their family.

== Filmography ==
| Year | Title | Role | Notes |
|---|---|---|---|
| 2000 | Hype | Himself/various | |
| 2001 | Late Friday | Himself | |
| 2001–2006 | MADtv | Himself/various | 117 episodes |
| 2003–2012 | Fox NFL Sunday | Himself/various | |
| 2004 | Comedy Central Presents | Himself | |
| 2004 | National Lampoon Live: New Faces - Volumes 1 & 2 | Himself/host | |
| 2004 | Wisconsin Born & Bred: The Entertainers | Himself | |
| 2005 | Mind of Mencia | George W. Bush | Voice only |
| 2007 | Frank Caliendo: All Over the Place | Himself | |
| 2007 | The 2007 White House Correspondents Dinner | Himself | |
| 2007 | The Comebacks | Chip Imitation | |
| 2007–2008 | Frank TV | Host/various | |
| 2008 | The Comedy Festival Presents: Funniest Movies of the Year 2008 | Himself/host | |
| 2011 | Hot in Cleveland | Kenny | Season 2; episode 13: "Unseparated at Birth" |
| 2014 | Sullivan and Son | Ralph | Season 3; episode 6: "Lyle and Son" |
| 2014 | The Birthday Boys | Himself | Season 1, episode 4: "Rock and Roll" |
| 2014 | Gravity Falls | Sergei | Season 2; episode 3: "The Golf War" (voice only) |
| 2015, 2017 | Liv and Maddie | Vince | 2 episodes |

== Discography ==
- Make the Voices Stop (2002)
- Frank on the Radio (2003)
- Frank on the Radio 2, Volume 1 (2007)
- Frank on the Radio 2, Volume 2 (2007)
- All Over the Place (2008)
- National Lampoon Live: Unleashed (2009)
