= Yester Chapel =

Church in East Lothian, Scotland

Coordinates: 55.8951°N 2.7297°W

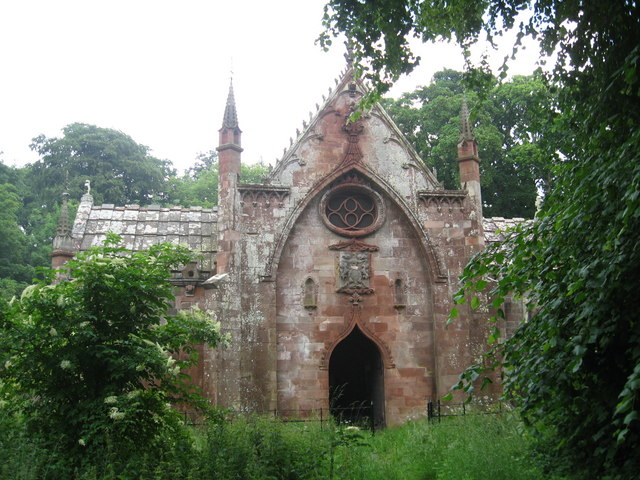
Yester Chapel, former Parish Kirk of Bothans and Collegiate Church of St. Cuthbert

Yester Chapel is situated on the estate of Yester House, at the south-east edge of the village of Gifford in East Lothian, Scotland. The chapel is situated at grid reference NT544671. It is a Category A listed building.

== History ==
It is not known when the first church was built on this site but is thought to have been erected by the de Giffard family in the early 13th century, the church having been consecrated by David de Bernham, Bishop of St. Andrews in 1241. Bothans was the original name of the church and village. The lands of Yester were granted to Hugh de Giffard in the 12th century by King Malcolm IV of Scotland and his mother Ada de Warenne. Confirmation of that grant was made at Durham, by Malcolm's brother, William I of Scotland between 1198 and 1202 to Hugo's son William de Giffard. The king referred to Yester as Jhestrid. The church served the parish until 1421 when the new owners of Yester, the Hay family, applied to the Archbishop of St. Andrews to erect the kirk to college status. The application was made by the proprietors of the church, William de Hay, Thomas Boyd, Eustace Maxwell and Dougal McDowel. At that time Sir John Richardson was Rector of Bothans Kirk. The Collegiate Church of St. Cuthbert at Bothans now served the Hay family to pray for their souls. It was attended by a provost, four prebendaries, a chaplain and singing boys. In 1539, Robert Watherstone was the provost and the college now had six prebendaries.

== After the Reformation ==
After the Reformation in 1560, the church returned to being the Parish Church of Bothans or Bothanis as it was sometimes known, with the Hay family still the principal proprietors. That situation continued until the Hays, now the Marquesses of Tweeddale, decided to build a new village, Gifford, East Lothian, and clear the village of Bothans. They also built a new church, Yester Kirk in 1708, spelling the end for the old kirk at Bothans. Bothans Kirk, now known as Yester Chapel, became the burial aisle of the Hay family. The church has had much restoration and necessary repairs over the years.

== Word meanings ==
Yester is from Yestryd, Cymric for strath or dale. Bothans is from the Gaelic Bothans or Welsh Bwthyn, both words meaning "a group of small dwellings".

== See also ==
- List of places in East Lothian
