= Yester Castle =

Castle ruins in East Lothian, Scotland

Coordinates: 55°53′26.23″N 2°42′37.92″W

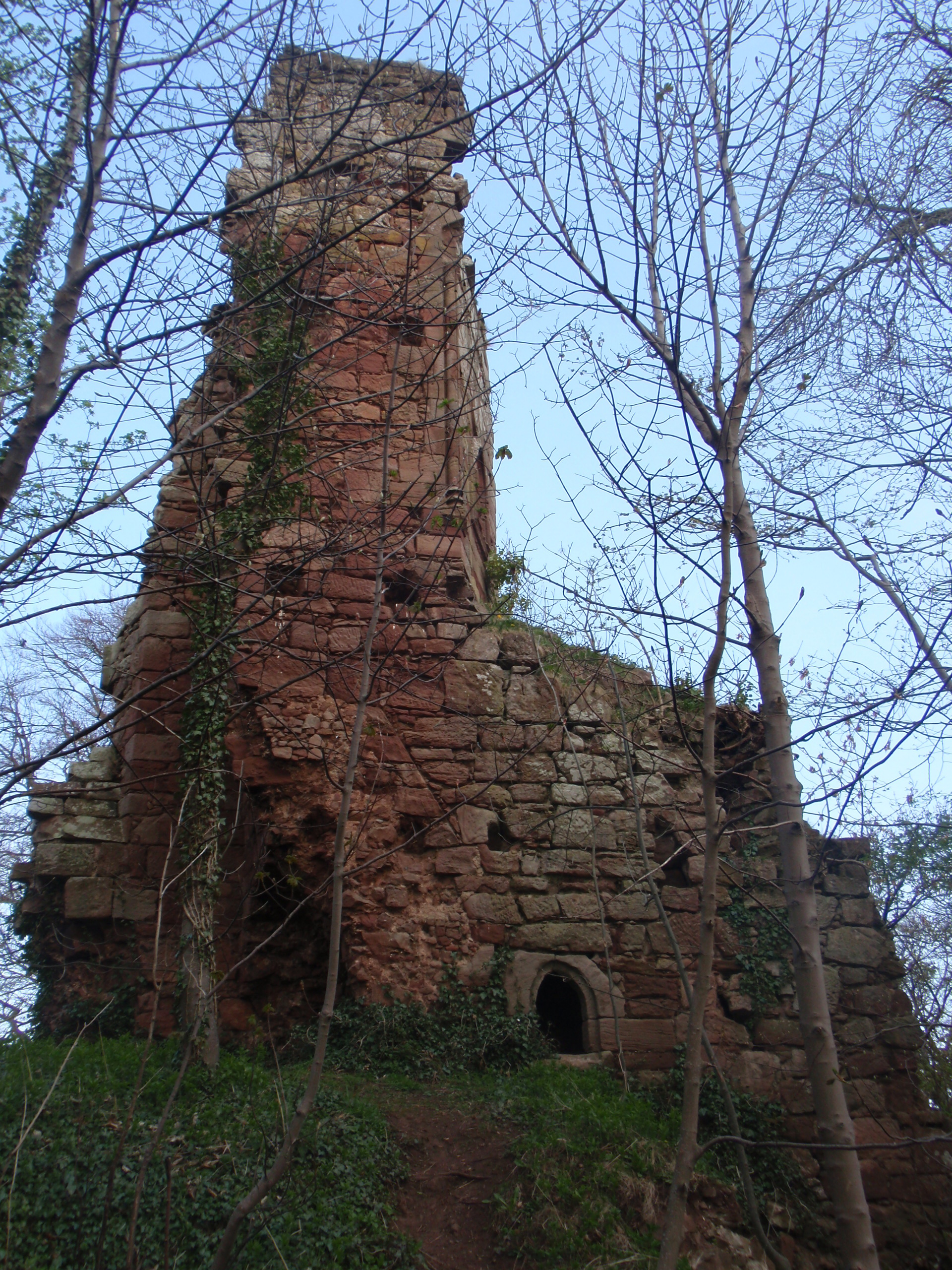

General information
- Location: East Lothian, Gifford, Scotland
- Completed: Before 1267

Yester Castle is a ruined castle, located 1 1/2 miles (2.5 kilometres) southeast of the village of Gifford in East Lothian, Scotland. The only remaining complete structure is the subterranean Goblin Ha' or Hobgoblin Ha' (Goblin Hall). It is a Scheduled Ancient Monument, recorded as such by the Royal Commission on the Ancient and Historical Monuments of Scotland.

== History ==
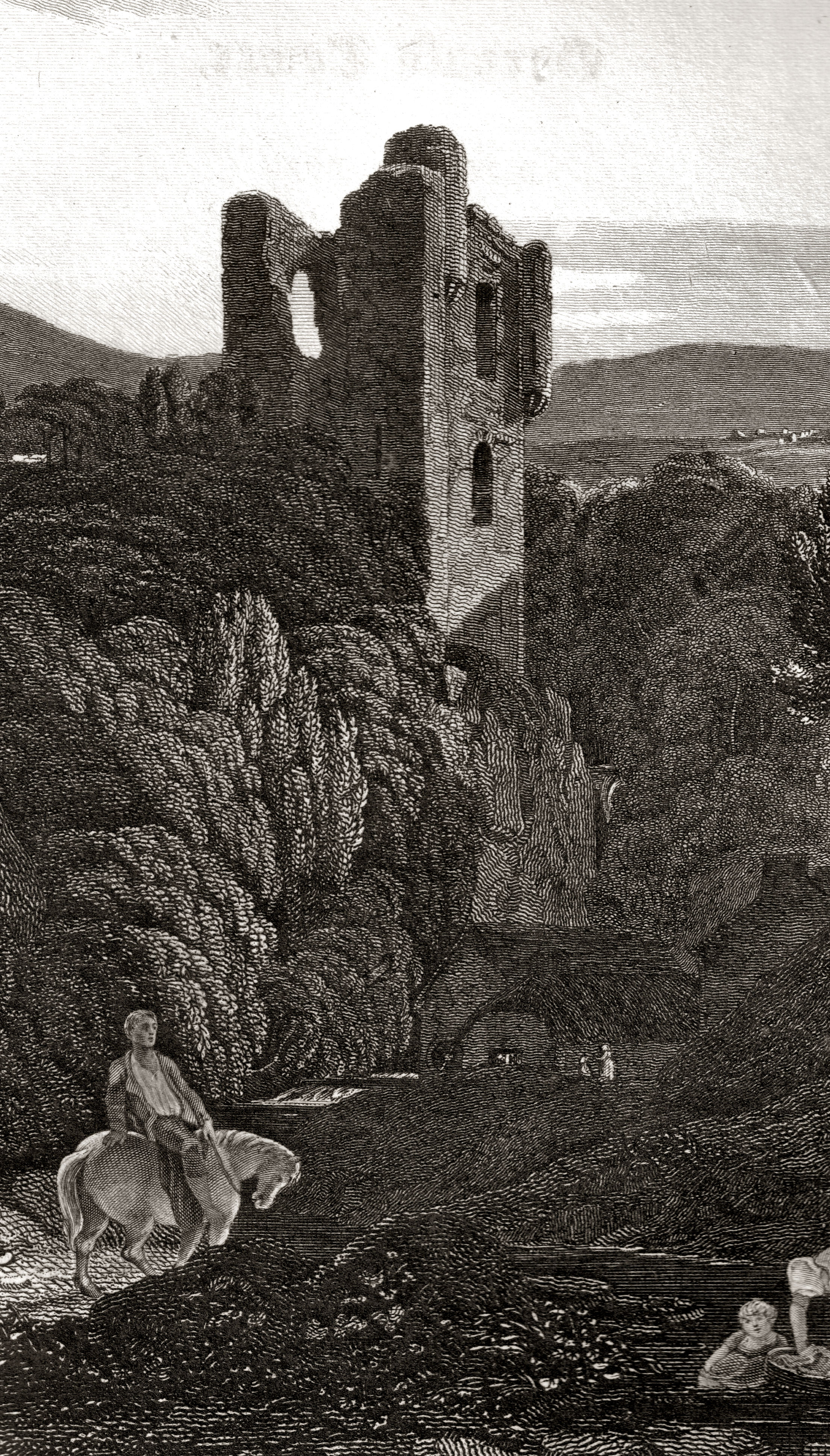
The tower in 1814

Originally known as Yestred (from the Brythonic Ystrad, meaning strath or dale), the barony of Yester was granted by King Malcolm IV of Scotland c. 1155 and confirmed by King William the Lion to Hugo de Giffard, a Norman immigrant given land in East Lothian during the reign of King David I. Latin language documents note the location as Zester in vital records.

The original stone keep, built before 1267, is generally considered to be by Sir Hugo de Giffard. A grandson of the first Laird of Yester, he served as a guardian of the young Alexander III of Scotland, and was by repute a magician and necromancer. Alexander III is known to have been at Yester on and around 24 May 1278, where he corresponded with Edward I of England. Following the Scots Wars of Independence, Yester was rebuilt as a castle of enceinte.

In 1298, during the Battle of Falkirk, Alexander de Welles, Master of Torphichen Preceptory, was killed. Based on the heraldic evidence there is very little doubt that Alexander de Welles was a member of the Lincolnshire Welle(s) family. Also at Falkirk was Adam de Welle(s) of Lincolnshire and of the Castle of Yester in Lothian, to whom the English King Edward I, during his occupation of Scotland, gave various properties confiscated from the Lothian nobility and gentry.

In 1357, there being no male line left of the Giffards, Joanna, a daughter and co-heiress, of the last Sir Hugo de Giffard, married Sir William [or Thomas] de la Haye of Peebles, of Locherworth (Locherwart), the Sheriff of Peebles. He was invested with the barony and lands of Yester through his wife. The barony has stayed with the Hay family ever since.

John Hay of Yester was in 1487 created a Lord of Parliament, as the first Lord Hay of Yester. In 1513 during the disastrous Battle of Flodden, John, second Lord Hay, was killed along with a great proportion of the country's fighting men. In May 1544 during the conflict known as the Rough Wooing, the castle, village, and harvest were burnt by the English army returning from the burning of Edinburgh.

John, 4th Lord Hay defended the castle from an English force in 1547, and was captured later that year at the Battle of Pinkie and held in the Tower of London for three years. In February 1548 the English commander Grey of Wilton captured the castle and put George Douglas of Pittendreich in charge of Yester and Dalkeith. French soldiers taken at Yester were used at hostages by the English. According to Ulpian Fulwell, the captured garrison was mostly Scottish or Spanish. Two men suspected of shouting insults defaming Edward VI were made to fight a duel at the market place of Haddington.

1557 saw the death of the 4th Lord Hay. His son William abandoned the castle and moved into a new tower house on the site of the present day mansion of Yester House. In 1646 the 8th Lord John Hay was created Marquess of Tweeddale. The castle gradually fell into disrepair, and by the late 17th century was in a very parlous state, the stones having been much quarried for building material. Although the castle almost disappeared completely, Sir Hugo's original Goblin Ha' was tenanted by the Marquess' falconer until 1737. Yester House with its Adam interiors was sold in 1972 to Italian/American operatic composer Gian-Carlo Menotti then left to his son, Chip, who sold it in 2013.

In 2021 it was reported that stone had been stolen from the supporting walls of the vaults. As this is a load bearing wall, and because "the ruin is protected [...] under the Ancient Monuments and Archaeological Areas Act 1979", the castle was closed to the public pending investigation. Recent reports have highlighted that ancient stone and metal theft is becoming more prevalent.

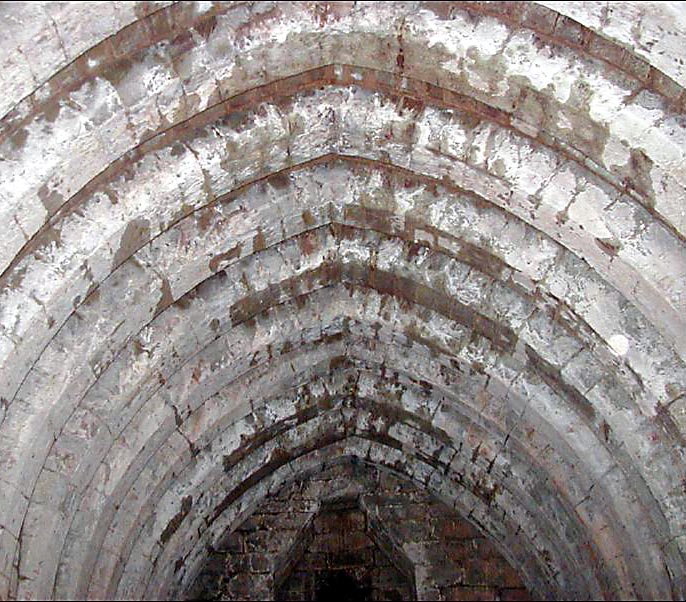
Goblin Ha' vaulting

== The Wizard of Yester ==
Sir Hugo de Giffard was known as the "Wizard of Yester", and was considered to be a powerful warlock and necromancer. It is in the undercroft of the castle that he was thought to practise his sorcery. The 15th-century chronicler Walter Bower mentions the large cavern in Yester Castle, thought locally to have been formed by magical artifice:

"The death occurred of Hugh Gifford, lord of Yester. Old tales tell that his castle, or at least his cellar and keep, were wrought by witchcraft, for there is there a marvellous underground cavern wonderfully constructed and extending under a large area of ground. It is popularly called Bo' Hall."

Legend supposed that Hugo was able, via a pact with the Devil, to raise a magical army to his aid, and use them to carry out his will. It is this army of hobgoblins that was considered the builders of Yester Castle.

=== The Colstoun Pear ===
When his daughter Margaret was to marry, Sir Hugo gave her and her husband-to-be, Broun of Colstoun, a hand-picked pear with the proviso that should anything happen to this fruit it would spell disaster for the Broun family. The pear was encased in a silver box and kept safe; the Brouns prospered.

A few hundred years later however, in 1692, on her wedding night, the fiancée of Sir George Broun, a Baronet of Nova Scotia and inheritor of the Colstoun estate, decided to remove the pear from its casket. The fruit looked as good as when it was picked, and she could not resist taking a bite. Misfortune quickly followed. Sir George Broun amassed enormous gambling debts and was forced to sell the estate to his brother Robert. Robert with his two sons were soon after killed, en route to Edinburgh; they were swept away by a flash flood caused by the River Tyne bursting its banks. In destitution, Sir George died in 1718 without a male heir. It was said that after the pear was tasted it turned as hard as rock, and with its bitemark in evidence, it is still at Colstoun House to this day.

=== Literary references ===
For his supposed role in the struggles between King Haakon of Norway and King Alexander, ultimately culminating in the Battle of Largs, Sir Walter Scott immortalises Giffard in Marmion:

A Clerk could tell what years have flown
Since Alexander fill’d our throne,
(Third monarch of that warlike name,)
And eke the time when here he came
To seek Sir Hugo, then our lord:
A braver never drew a sword;
A wiser never, at the hour
Of midnight, spoke the word of power:
The same, whom ancient records call
The founder of the Goblin-Hall.

Marmion, Canto III, Stanza XIX, lines 324–333.

== See also ==
- List of castles in Scotland
- List of places in East Lothian
