= James Hay, 7th Lord Hay of Yester =

Scottish landowner and courtier (1564–1609)

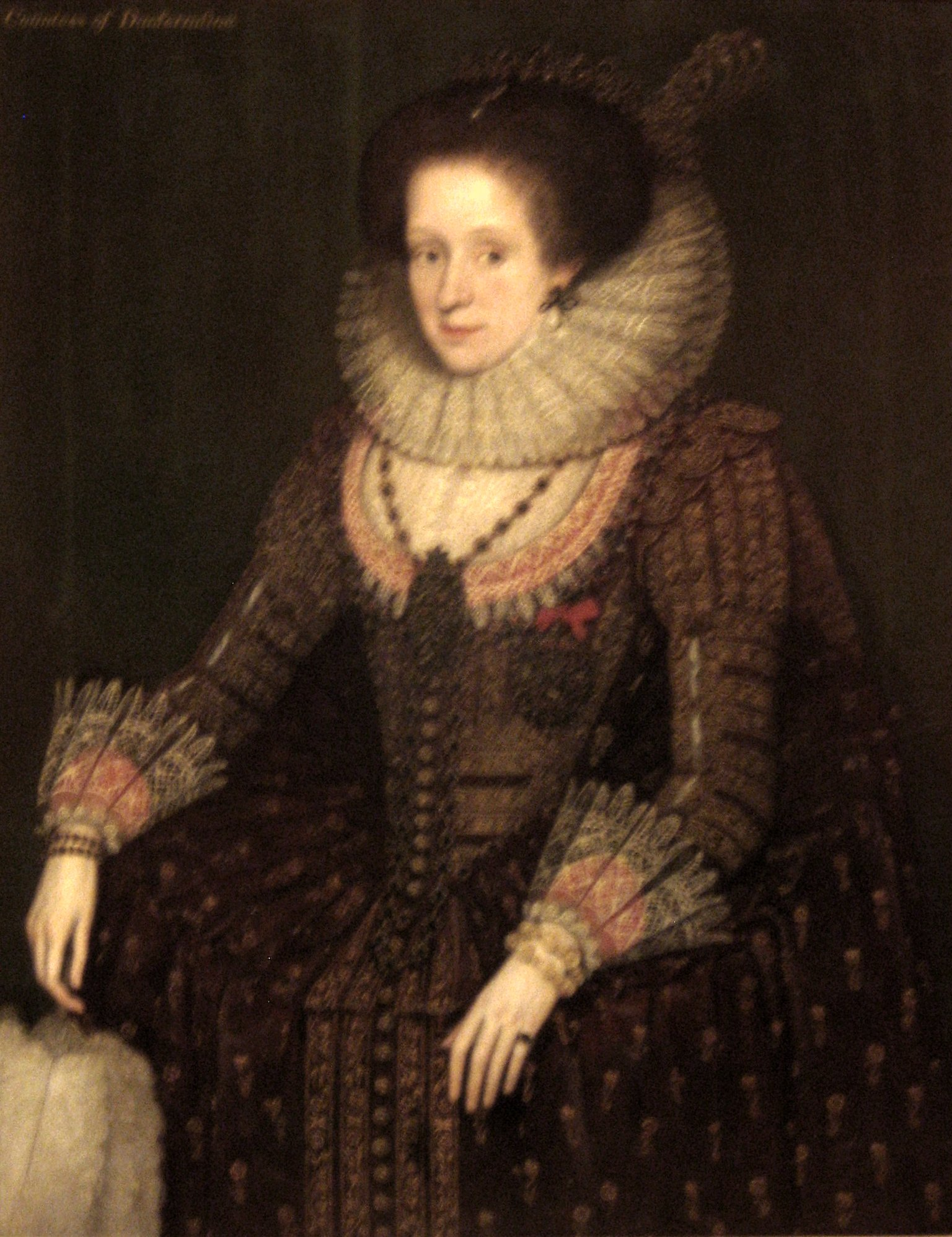
Margaret Hay, Countess of Dunfermline, Marcus Gheeraerts the Younger, Dunedin Art Gallery

James Hay, 7th Lord Hay of Yester (1564-1609) was a Scottish landowner and courtier.

He was a son of William Hay, 5th Lord Hay of Yester and Margaret Ker eldest daughter of Sir John Ker of Ferniehirst.

His older brother William Hay, 6th Lord Hay of Yester and his nephew died before him, so he became Lord Hay of Yester in 1591.

His homes were Yester Castle and nearby Bothans, replaced by Yester House, in East Lothian, and Neidpath Castle in the Scottish Borders.

He died on 3 February 1609. His will was dated at the Place of Bothans, 24 January 1609.

== Family ==
He married Margaret Ker, a daughter of Mark Kerr, 1st Earl of Lothian. Their children included:

- John Hay, 8th Lord Hay of Yester later Earl of Tweeddale.
- William Hay of Linplum, who married Anne Murray (d. 1658), a daughter of William Murray of Dunearn.
- Robert Hay
- Margaret Hay of Yester (d. 1659), married in 1607 (1) Alexander Seton, 1st Earl of Dunfermline, and (2) James Livingston, 1st Earl of Callendar.

In 1644 his widow Margaret Ker founded Lady Yester's Kirk in Edinburgh.

Peerage of Scotland
Preceded by William Hay	Lord Hay of Yester; 1591–1609	Succeeded by John Hay
