= List of listed buildings in Yester, East Lothian =

This is a list of listed buildings in the parish of Yester in East Lothian, Scotland.

== List ==
| Name | Location | Date Listed | Grid Ref. (Note: Sometimes known as OSGB36, the grid reference (where provided) is based on the British national grid reference system used by the Ordnance Survey. • "Guide to National Grid". Ordnance Survey. • "Get-a-map". Ordnance Survey.) | Geo-coordinates | Notes | LB Number (Note: Historic Environment Scotland assign a unique alphanumeric identifier to each designated site in Scotland, for listed buildings this always begins with "LB", for example "LB12345".) | Image |
|---|---|---|---|---|---|---|---|
| Gifford, 1 The Avenue With Outbuildings | | | | 55°54′09″N 2°44′51″W | Category B | 14663 | Upload Photo |
| Gifford, The Avenue, Yester House Gate Lodges, Gates And Gatepiers And Railings | | | | 55°54′02″N 2°44′39″W | Category A | 14667 | Upload another image |
| Gifford, Bridge By Forbes Lodge | | | | 55°54′07″N 2°44′56″W | Category B | 14668 | Upload Photo |
| Yester House With East Pavilion | | | | 55°53′43″N 2°43′54″W | Category A | 14693 | Upload another image |
| Gifford, Duns Road, Curlew Cottage | | | | 55°54′12″N 2°44′44″W | Category B | 14671 | Upload Photo |
| Gifford, Gifford Vale With Outbuilding, Dovecot, Retaining And Quadrant Walls With Gatepiers | | | | 55°54′25″N 2°44′52″W | Category B | 14678 | Upload Photo |
| Gifford, The Lane Braewell | | | | 55°54′07″N 2°44′39″W | Category C(S) | 14679 | Upload Photo |
| Gifford, Main Street, Goblin Ha' Hotel | | | | 55°54′12″N 2°44′50″W | Category C(S) | 14681 | Upload Photo |
| Gifford, Station Road, Mill House | | | | 55°54′12″N 2°44′55″W | Category C(S) | 14687 | Upload Photo |
| Gifford, Station Road, Old Mill | | | | 55°54′17″N 2°44′59″W | Category C(S) | 14688 | Upload Photo |
| Gifford, High Street, Tweeddale Arms Hotel | | | | 55°54′10″N 2°44′48″W | Category B | 14705 | Upload Photo |
| Gifford, The Square, Greenfoot Cottage | | | | 55°54′11″N 2°44′52″W | Category B | 19275 | Upload Photo |
| Yester House, Gardeners Cottage (Bailiffs Cottage), Walled Garden, Stalk And Hot Houses | | | | 55°53′47″N 2°44′13″W | Category B | 18194 | Upload Photo |
| Gifford, High Street, Greenbank | | | | 55°54′09″N 2°44′46″W | Category C(S) | 14657 | Upload Photo |
| Gifford, Duns Road, Ashlea And Kirkview | | | | 55°54′12″N 2°44′43″W | Category B | 14670 | Upload Photo |
| Gifford, Gifford Bank With Gatepiers | | | | 55°54′03″N 2°45′07″W | Category B | 14675 | Upload Photo |
| Redshill Farmhouse | | | | 55°53′10″N 2°45′38″W | Category B | 14691 | Upload Photo |
| Yester Parish Kirk With Hearse House And Piers, Gates And Graveyard Walls (Church Of Scotland) | | | | 55°54′14″N 2°44′43″W | Category A | 14697 | Upload another image See more images |
| Gifford, High Street, Hopeswood | | | | 55°54′08″N 2°44′44″W | Category B | 14658 | Upload Photo |
| Gifford, Duns Road, The Pirn | | | | 55°54′13″N 2°44′43″W | Category C(S) | 14672 | Upload Photo |
| Gifford, The Square, Dolphin Cottage | | | | 55°54′12″N 2°44′51″W | Category B | 14682 | Upload Photo |
| Gifford, Station Road, Bridge | | | | 55°54′11″N 2°44′54″W | Category C(S) | 14686 | Upload Photo |
| Broadwoodside Farm | | | | 55°54′16″N 2°45′34″W | Category B | 44954 | Upload Photo |
| Gifford War Memorial | | | | 55°54′13″N 2°44′45″W | Category C(S) | 14654 | Upload Photo |
| Gifford, High Street, Avenue House | | | | 55°54′08″N 2°44′44″W | Category C(S) | 14655 | Upload Photo |
| Gifford, 2 The Avenue | | | | 55°54′09″N 2°44′50″W | Category C(S) | 14664 | Upload Photo |
| Gifford, 3 The Avenue | | | | 55°54′09″N 2°44′51″W | Category B | 14665 | Upload Photo |
| Gifford, Gifford Green, Retaining Walls With Gatepiers | | | | 55°54′07″N 2°44′45″W | Category B | 14676 | Upload Photo |
| Gifford, Gifford Manse With Stable Range And Walled Garden | | | | 55°54′17″N 2°44′48″W | Category B | 14677 | Upload Photo |
| Gifford, The Square, Market Cross | | | | 55°54′11″N 2°44′50″W | Category B | 14683 | Upload Photo |
| Gifford, High Street, Muirlea | | | | 55°54′09″N 2°44′46″W | Category B | 14659 | Upload Photo |
| Gifford, 4 The Avenue | | | | 55°54′09″N 2°44′51″W | Category B | 14666 | Upload Photo |
| Gifford, Forbes Lodge With Gatepiers And Garden Walls | | | | 55°54′08″N 2°44′59″W | Category B | 14674 | Upload Photo |
| Gifford, Main Street, Cornerways | | | | 55°54′13″N 2°44′47″W | Category C(S) | 14680 | Upload Photo |
| Gifford, The Square, Town Hall | | | | 55°54′12″N 2°44′51″W | Category B | 14684 | Upload another image |
| Gifford, The Wynd, George Cottage With Boundary Wall | | | | 55°54′11″N 2°44′45″W | Category B | 14689 | Upload Photo |
| Yester House, St Bothan's Chapel, Formerly St Cuthbert's Collegiate Church | | | | 55°53′43″N 2°43′47″W | Category A | 14695 | Upload another image See more images |
| Gifford, High Street, Ystrad House With Retaining Walls | | | | 55°54′05″N 2°44′40″W | Category B | 14706 | Upload Photo |
| Gifford, Duns Road, Ashvale | | | | 55°54′13″N 2°44′40″W | Category C(S) | 14669 | Upload Photo |
| Gifford, Duns Road, Rowan Cottage | | | | 55°54′13″N 2°44′42″W | Category B | 14673 | Upload Photo |
| Yester House, Bridge And Tunnel | | | | 55°53′49″N 2°44′06″W | Category B | 14694 | Upload Photo |
| Yester House, Stables | | | | 55°53′48″N 2°44′17″W | Category B | 14696 | Upload Photo |
| Gifford, High Street, Beechwood With Retaining Walls And Gatepiers | | | | 55°54′05″N 2°44′39″W | Category B | 14656 | Upload Photo |
| Gifford, The Square, Wellhead | | | | 55°54′11″N 2°44′50″W | Category B | 14685 | Upload Photo |
| Gifford, The Wynd, Rockingstone | | | | 55°54′12″N 2°44′44″W | Category B | 14690 | Upload Photo |
| Townhead Farmhouse | | | | 55°54′26″N 2°43′12″W | Category B | 14692 | Upload Photo |
| Gifford, 25 High Street | | | | 55°54′06″N 2°44′42″W | Category C(S) | 14707 | Upload Photo |

== Key ==
The scheme for classifying buildings in Scotland is:

- Category A: "buildings of national or international importance, either architectural or historic; or fine, little-altered examples of some particular period, style or building type."
- Category B: "buildings of regional or more than local importance; or major examples of some particular period, style or building type, which may have been altered."
- Category C: "buildings of local importance; lesser examples of any period, style, or building type, as originally constructed or moderately altered; and simple traditional buildings which group well with other listed buildings."

In March 2016 there were 47,288 listed buildings in Scotland. Of these, 8% were Category A, and 50% were Category B, with the remaining 42% being Category C.

== See also ==
- List of listed buildings in East Lothian
