= James Smith (architect, died 1731) =

Scottish architect

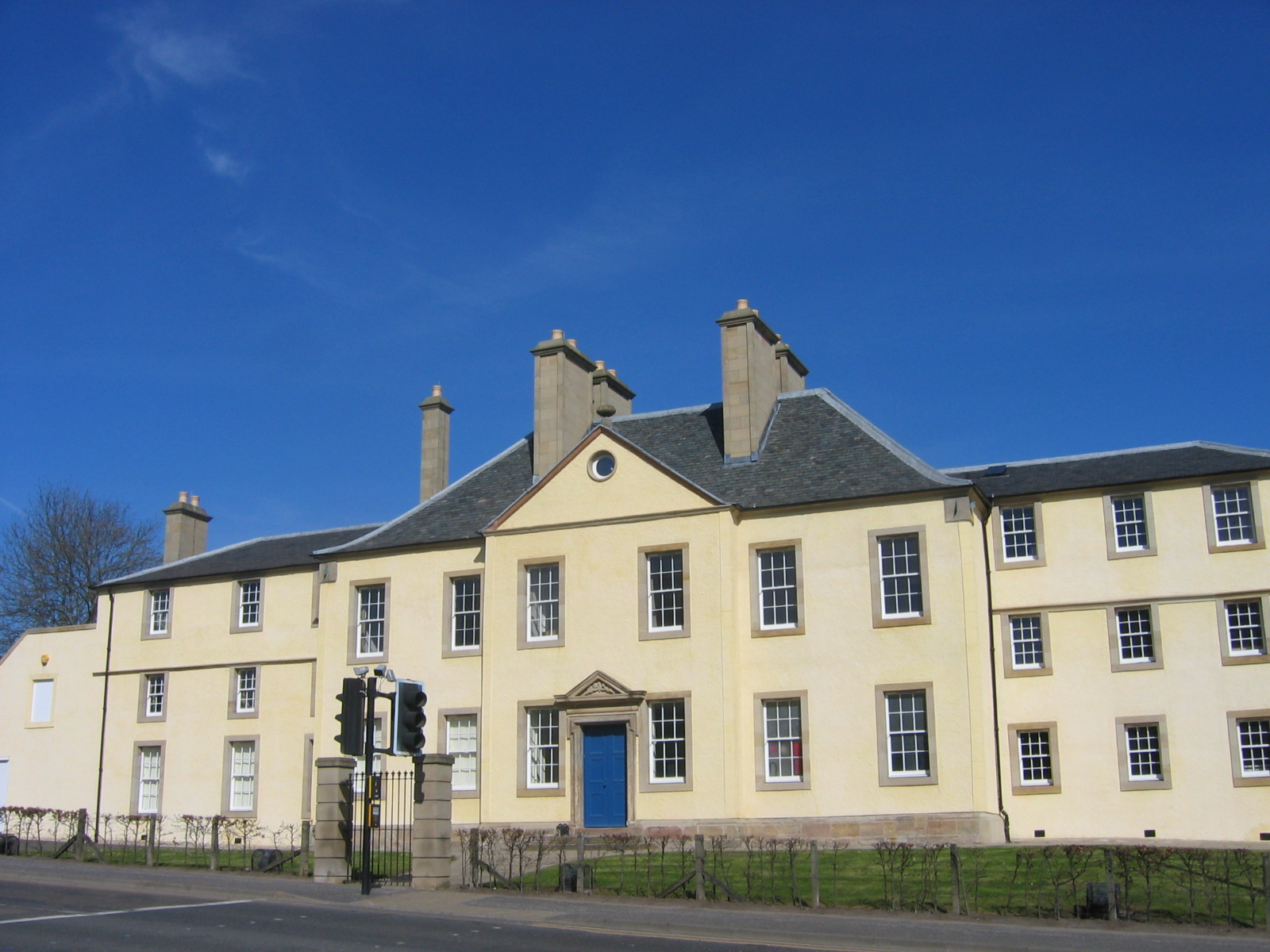
The Low Parks Museum in Hamilton, originally designed by James Smith as the home of David Crawford, secretary to the Duke of Hamilton.

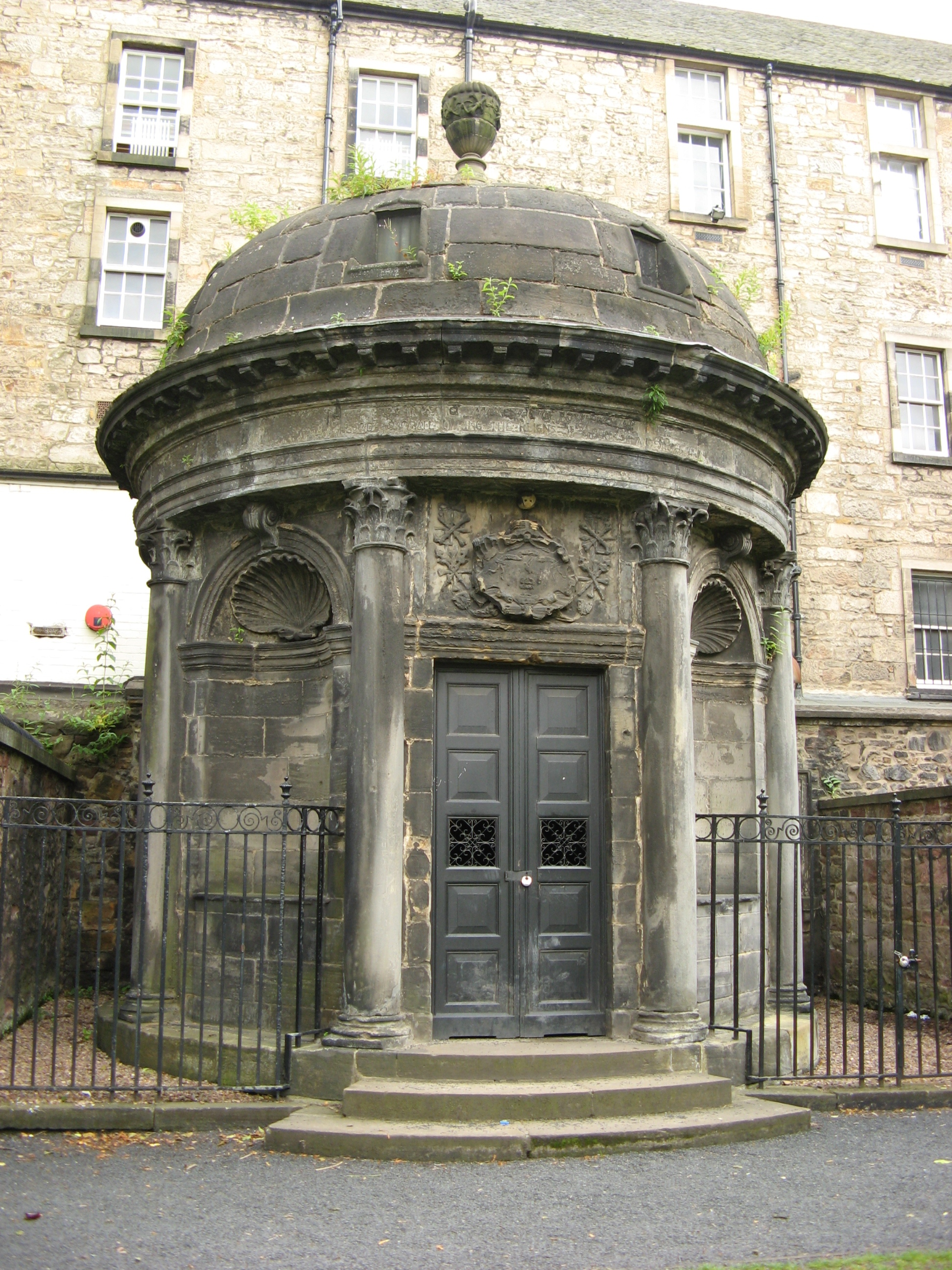
Tomb of Sir George Mackenzie in Greyfriars Kirkyard

James Smith (c. 1645 – d. 1731) was a Scottish architect, who pioneered the Palladian style in Scotland. He was described by Colen Campbell, in his Vitruvius Britannicus (1715–1725), as "the most experienced architect of that kingdom".

== Biography ==
Born in Tarbat, Ross, Smith was the son of James Smith (died c.1684), a mason, who became a burgess of Forres, Moray, in 1659. The architect is generally identified as the "James Smith of Morayshire" who attended the Scots College, Rome from 1671–75, initially with the aim of entering the Catholic priesthood, although some scholars are cautious about the certainty of this identification. He had certainly travelled abroad, however, and was well-educated, with a knowledge of Latin.

By December 1677, Smith was in touch with Sir William Bruce, the most prominent architect of the time in Scotland, and the designer of the rebuilt Holyrood Palace, Edinburgh. Here, Smith served as a mason, under the direction of the master mason Robert Mylne. By December 1679 he was married to Mylne's daughter Janet, when he was made a burgess of Edinburgh in right of his father-in-law. He was admitted to the Incorporation of St Mary's Chapel, the guild of masons and wrights in Edinburgh, in 1680.

In 1683 he was appointed, at the recommendation of the Duke of Queensberry, to the post of Surveyor and Overseer of the Royal Works, a post previously held by Bruce, with a salary of £100 a year. He was responsible for maintenance of Holyrood Palace, and refurbished the former Holyrood Abbey as a chapel royal for King James VII. From 1685–86 he sat in the Parliament of Scotland as member for Forres.

His Royal appointment was renewed after the Union of England and Scotland in 1707, but he never received further pay. He surveyed some of the forts built in the Highlands after 1714, for the Board of Ordnance, but this employment ended in 1719 with the appointment of Andrews Jelfe as architect to the Board. He complained in a letter to John Clerk of Penicuik that he had been "disgracefully turned out of His Majesty's service in the 73rd year of his age". In 1715 he unsuccessfully stood as a candidate for Member of Parliament for Edinburgh.

In 1686 he purchased the estate of Whitehill, near Musselburgh, on which he built a country house. However, an unsuccessful coal-mining venture forced him to sell part of the estate in 1706, and he assigned the rest to his son-in-law Gilbert Smith in 1726. Smith fathered 18 children by his first wife, Janet Mylne, who died in 1699, aged 37. He remarried, and fathered another 14 children by his second wife.

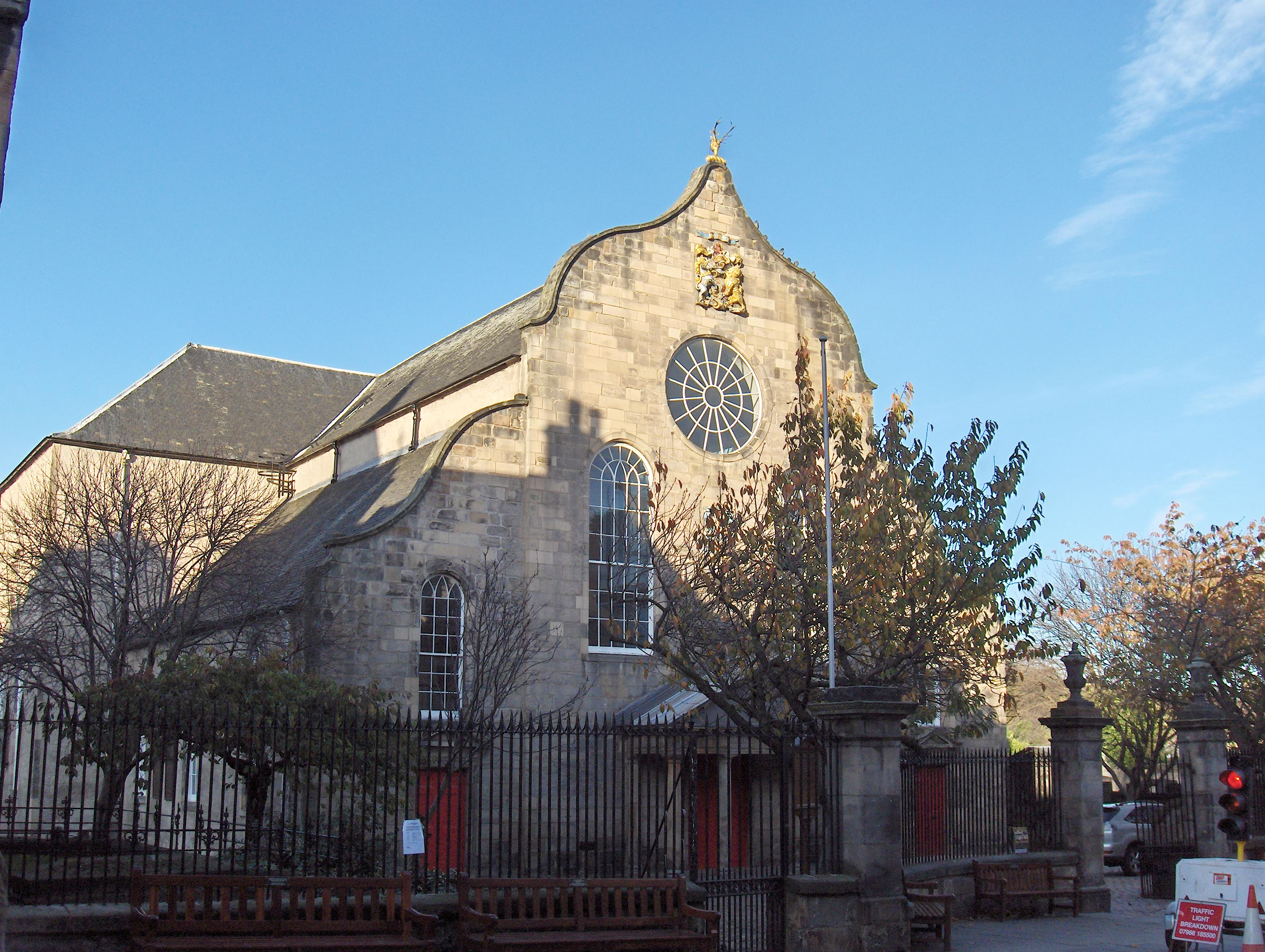
Kirk of the Canongate, on Edinburgh's Royal Mile

== Architectural works ==
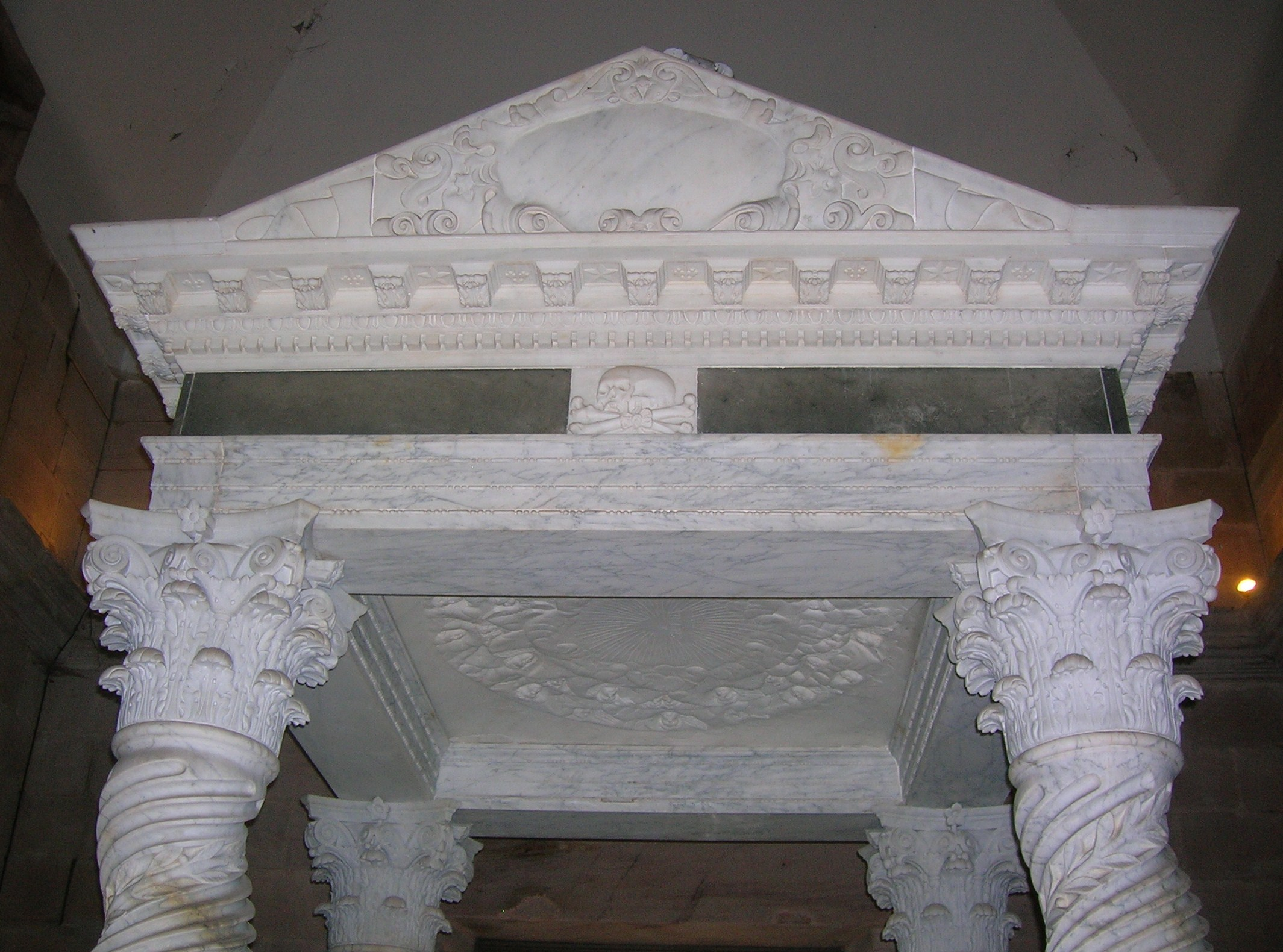
Balduchin by James Smith at Durisdeer in Scotland.

Smith's architectural training is not known. Architectural historian Howard Colvin has speculated that he was associated with Colen Campbell (1676–1729), the Scots architect who introduced Palladian architecture to England. On the basis of a number of Smith's drawings that were in Campbell's possession, Colvin even suggests that Campbell may have been Smith's pupil, and it was Smith who brought Italian ideas back from his travels, inspiring the British Palladianism of the 18th century.

With his father-in-law, Robert Mylne, Smith worked on Caroline Park in Edinburgh (1685), and Drumlanrig Castle (1680s). His Canongate Kirk (1688–1690) is a basilica-plan, with a baroque facade. In 1691 Smith designed the mausoleum of Sir George Mackenzie of Rosehaugh, in Greyfriars Kirkyard. This circular structure is modelled on the Tempietto di San Pietro, designed by Donato Bramante (1444–1514), and illustrated in Palladio's Quattro Libri. Smith's country houses follow the pattern established by William Bruce, with hipped roofs and pedimented fronts, in a plain but handsome Palladian style. Hamilton Palace (1695) was fronted by giant corinthian columns, and a pedimented entrance, although was otherwise restrained. He also designed the nearby estate office, now the Low Parks Museum. Dalkeith Palace (1702–1710) was modelled after William of Orange's palace at Het Loo in the Netherlands.

Other houses included Yester House (1701–1715), works at Alloa Tower for the Earl of Mar, as well as his own home, built around 1690 on his estate at Whitehill. Strathleven House in Dumbartonshire has been attributed to Smith on stylistic grounds. From 1700 he worked largely in association with the mason and architect Alexander McGill, and after 1710, ceased architectural work almost entirely.

== Engineering ==
Smith also undertook engineering work. For instance, he was employed as an arbitrator over a dispute concerning the construction of Cockenzie harbour. In 1701 he acquired the rights to manufacture the steam engine invented by Thomas Savery, and in the 1720s he was involved, with William Adam and Alexander McGill, in an early proposal for a Forth and Clyde Canal, linking Scotland's east and west coasts.

== List of architectural works ==
Architectural works by, or attributed to, James Smith.

- Drumlanrig Castle, Dumfriesshire (1680–1690), for the Duke of Queensberry, possibly designed with Robert Mylne
- Kirk of the Canongate, Edinburgh (1688–1690)
- Chapel Royal at Holyrood Palace, Edinburgh (1688), destroyed by an anti-Catholic mob the same year
- Whitehill, Musselburgh (c. 1690), Smith's own home, enlarged in the 18th century and now known as Newhailes
- Mausoleum of George Mackenzie of Rosehaugh (1691), Greyfriars Kirkyard, Edinburgh
- Newbattle Abbey, Midlothian (1693), advised the Earl of Lothian on alterations
- Hamilton Palace, Lanarkshire (1693–1701), for the Duchess of Hamilton. Extended in the 18th century and rebuilt in the 19th, the Palace was demolished in 1921.
- Raith House, Raith Estate, Kirkcaldy, Fife (1692–1694)
- Traquair House, Borders (1695–1699), alterations
- Durisdeer Church, and Queensberry Aisle, Dumfriesshire
- Monument to William Douglas, Duke of Hamilton (1634–1694), in Bothwell Church, Lanarkshire 1695)
- Melville House, Fife (1697–1700), for the Earl of Melville
- Yester House, East Lothian (1701–1715), with Alexander McGill for the Marquess of Tweeddale, altered in the 18th century
- Dalkeith House, Midlothian (1702–1710), major rebuilding for Anne, Duchess of Buccleuch
- Yester Parish Church, Gifford, East Lothian (1710), attributed to Smith and McGill
- Dupplin Castle, Perthshire (1720–1725), for the Earl of Kinnoull, destroyed by fire in 1827
- Smith's Land, High Street, Edinburgh (unknown date), later known as Paisley's Close

== Gallery of architectural work ==
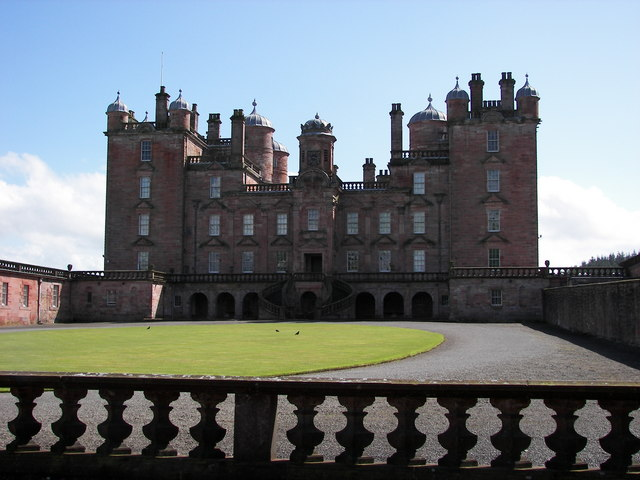
Drumlanrig Castle

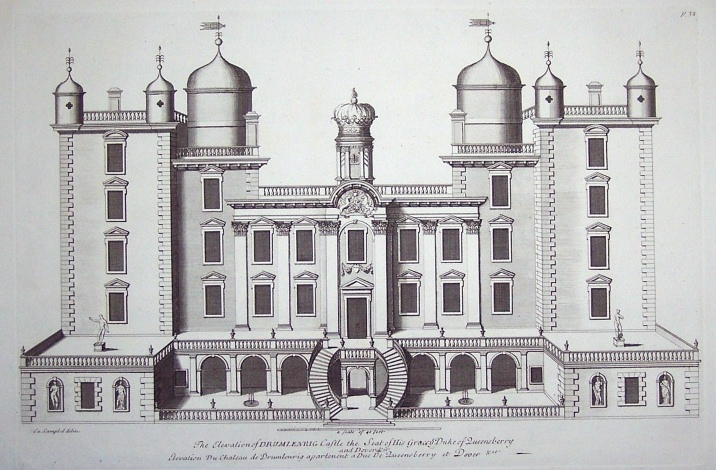
Drumlanrig Castle, elevation

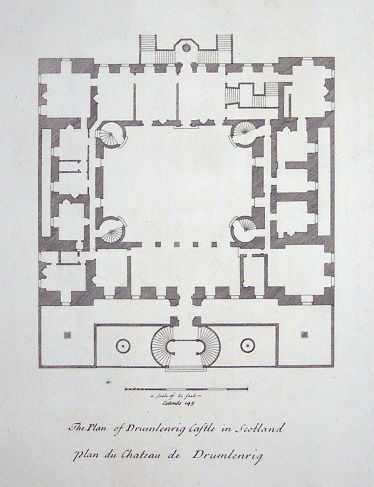
Drumlanrig Castle, plan

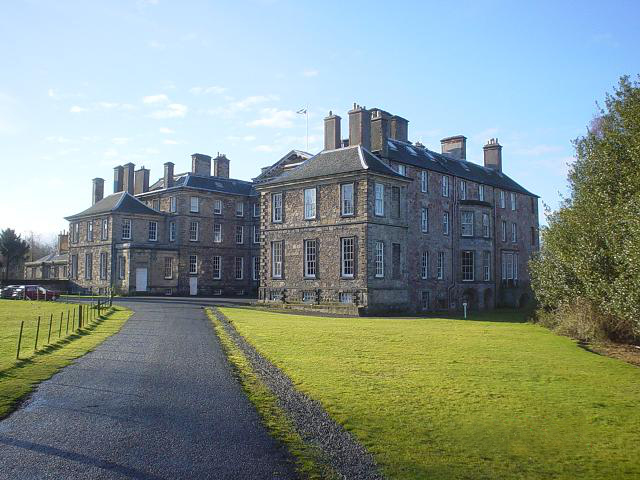
Dalkeith Palace

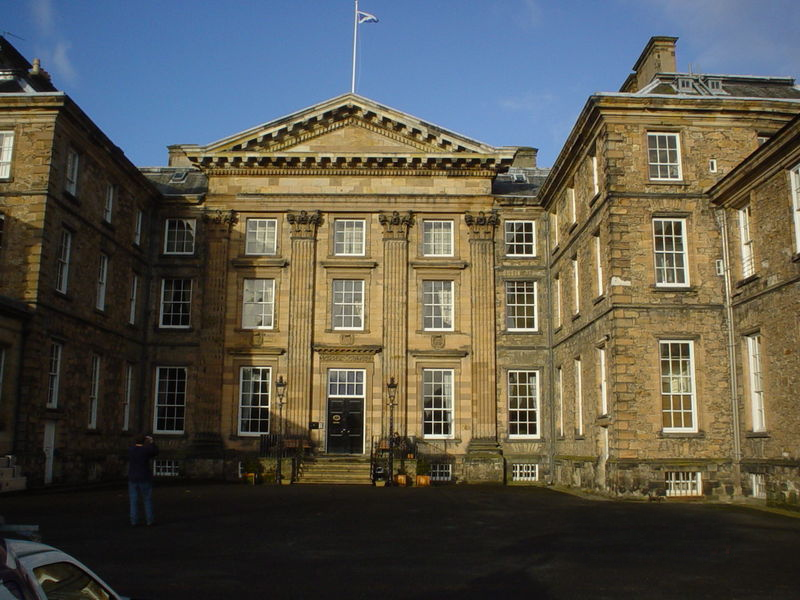
Dalkeith Palace

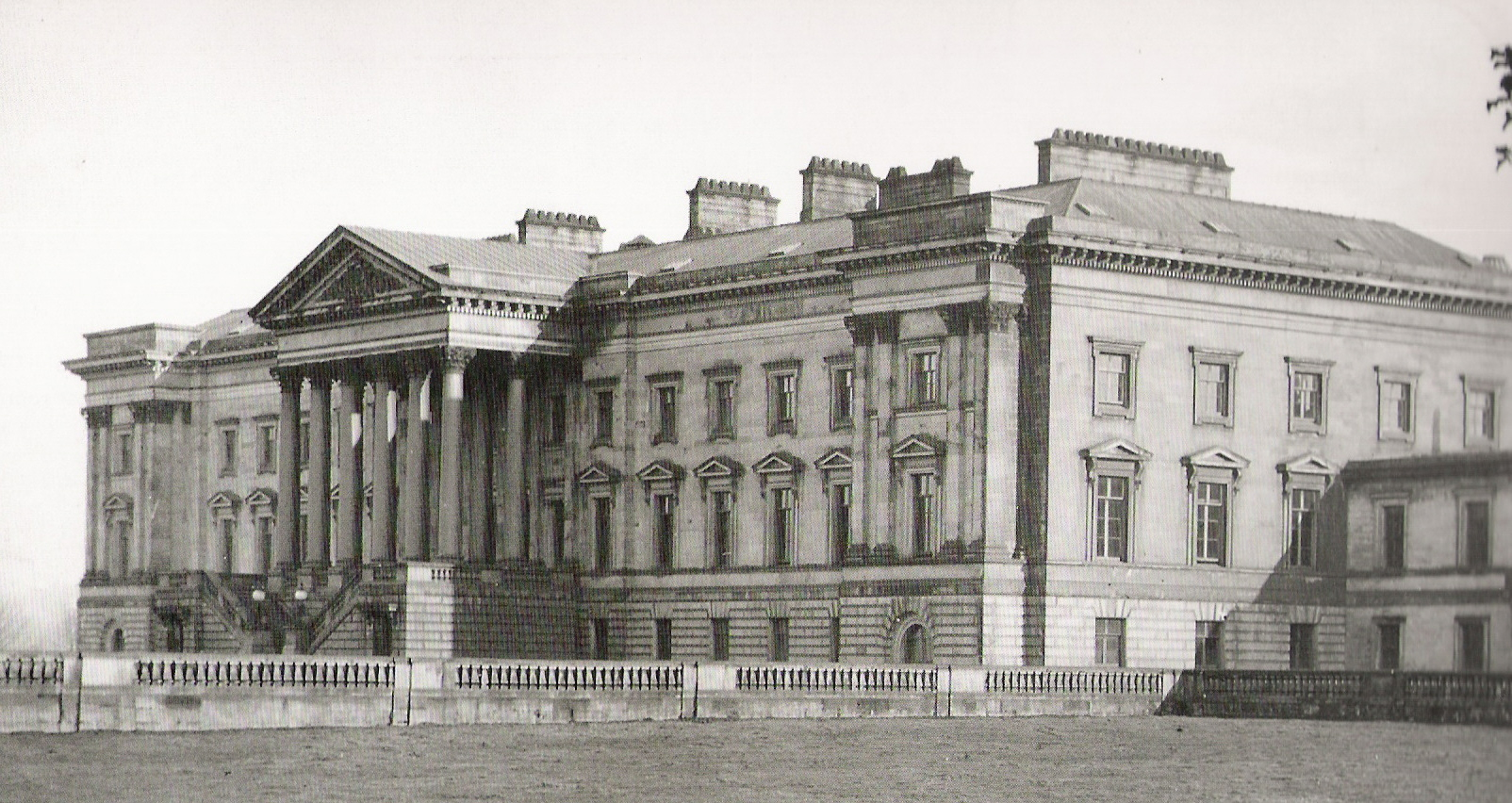
Hamilton Palace

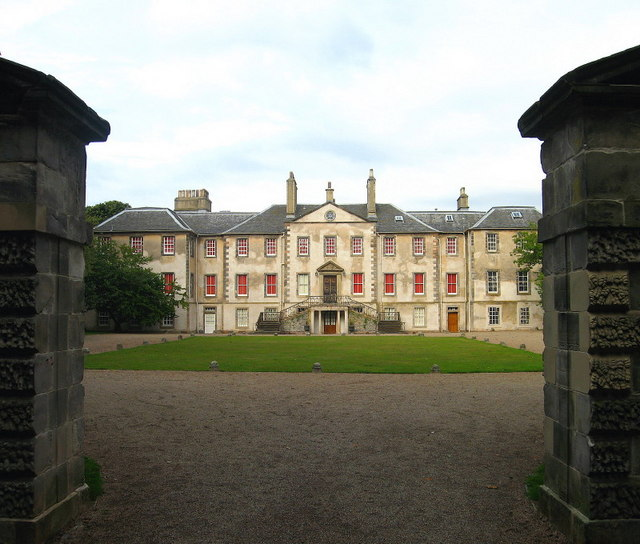
Entrance front, Newhailes

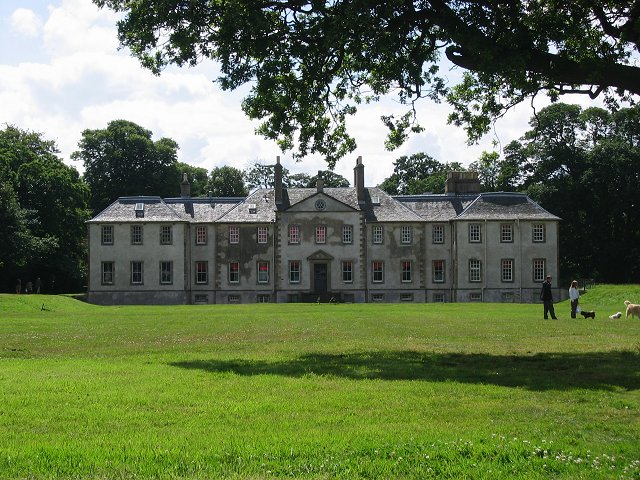
Garden front, Newhailes

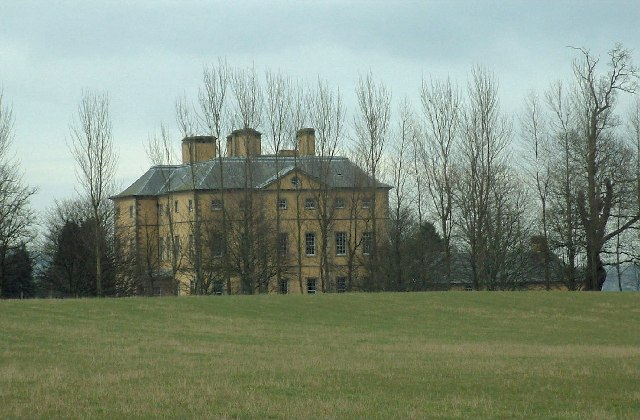
Melville House
