= Strathleven House =

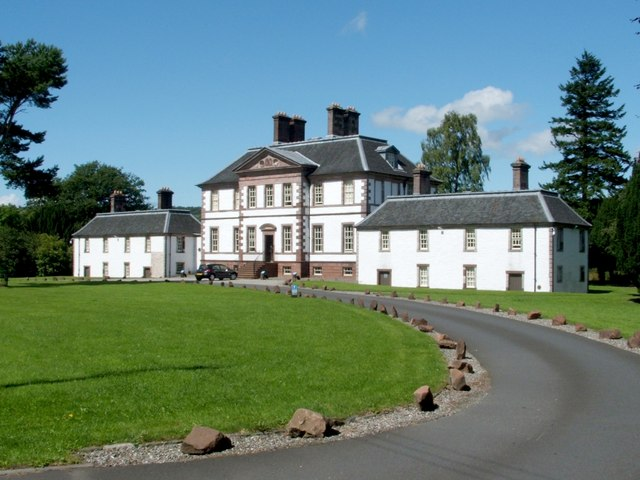
- Strathleven House

- Location in West Dunbartonshire
- 55.9692°N 4.5715°W

Listed Building – Category A
- Official name: Strathleven House
- Designated: 14 May 1971
- Reference no.: LB115

Listed Building – Category A
- Official name: Dovecot, Strathleven
- Designated: 14 May 1971
- Reference no.: LB823

Listed Building – Category B
- Official name: Coach house range and stable yard, Strathleven
- Designated: 14 May 1971
- Reference no.: LB822

Strathleven House is an early 18th-century country house in West Dunbartonshire, Scotland. It is located in the Vale of Leven, around 3 kilometres (1.9 mi) north of Dumbarton. Built in 1700, it is probably the work of the architect James Smith, and has been described as "the earliest surviving example of the classic Palladian country house in Scotland". Strathleven House, and its 18th-century dovecote, are protected as category A listed buildings,

== History ==
The Strathleven estate, then known as Kirkmichael, was owned in the 14th century by the Fleming family, passing to the Semples of Fulwood in the 17th century. In 1677 it was bought by the royalist William Cochrane, 1st Earl of Dundonald (1605–1685), who settled the estates of Strathleven and neighbouring Kilmaronock on his grandson William. This William married a daughter of James Graham, 2nd Marquess of Montrose, and sat in the Parliament of Scotland and the Parliament of Great Britain following the union of 1707.

A tower house may have existed on the estate at this time, but in 1700 William built the present house which he named Levenside. His initials and coat of arms are inscribed on the stonework of the building. The architect is unrecorded. It has been suggested that William Adam, Sir William Bruce, or Alexander McGill may have been responsible. However, on stylistic grounds James Smith is considered the most likely designer. The design of Strathleven has been compared to his houses at Newhailes near Edinburgh and Raith House in Kirkcaldy. The dovecote which stands nearby is considered to be contemporary with the house.

After William Cochrane's death in 1717 the house was sold to Archibald Campbell of Stonefield, a kinsman of the Duke of Argyll. In 1830 it was sold again, to Glasgow merchant James Ewing, who shortly after served as Lord Provost of Glasgow and Member of Parliament for Glasgow. He changed the name of the estate to Strathleven, and enlarged the estate substantially by the purchase of Dumbarton Muir from Dumbarton Town Council in 1841. He also made minor alterations to the house, as well as more significant additions to the grounds, including new stables. His widow lived in the house until 1900, when it was inherited by the Crum-Ewing family.

In 1947 Strathleven was compulsorily purchased by the Board of Trade. The area had been earmarked for redevelopment as a major industrial estate. By 1956, 2,700 people were employed at Strathleven Industrial Estate, but the house remained empty. Strathleven House deteriorated over subsequent decades, and in 1979 the interiors, including panelling and balustrades, were removed to storage to protect them from dry rot.

In 1985 the Scottish Historic Buildings Trust was established, partly in response to the need to save Strathleven House. The Trust succeeded in purchasing the house the following year, and repairs to stabilise the building and replace the roof were carried out between 1993 and 1996. A conservation plan was drawn up in 1997 for the full restoration of the house, which was completed in 2000. Since then the property has been leased by the Trust as serviced office accommodation and conference facilities. The 19th-century portico was re-erected as a folly at Broadwoodside, East Lothian.

The category B-listed coach house and stables, which are in the ownership of Scottish Enterprise, successors to the Board of Trade, remain in a derelict condition and are included on the Buildings at Risk Register for Scotland.

The Bruce Tree, an ancient oak reputedly planted by Robert the Bruce stood in the grounds of Strathleven House. It was felled by an arson attack in May 2004.
