= Gifford Town Hall =

Municipal building in Gifford, Scotland

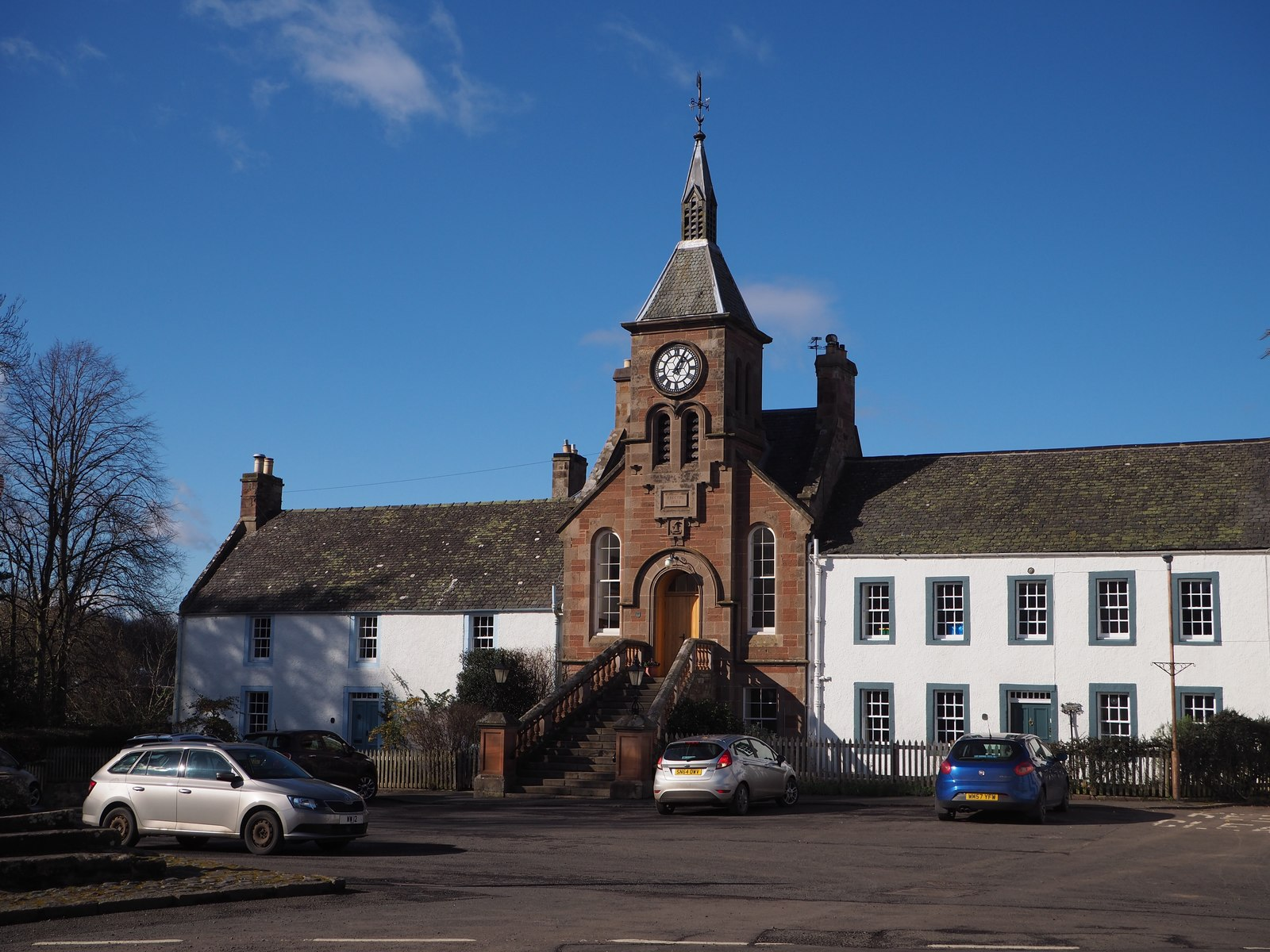
- Gifford Town Hall

- Shown in East Lothian
- 55.9031°N 2.7476°W
- Location: The Square, Gifford

History
- Built: 1884

Site notes
- Architectural style: Neoclassical style

Listed Building – Category B
- Official name: Gifford, The Square, Town Hall
- Designated: 5 February 1971
- Reference no.: LB14684

Gifford Town Hall is a municipal building in The Square, Gifford, East Lothian, Scotland. The structure, which is used as a community events venue, is a Category B listed building.

== History ==
The earliest part of the complex is the south-western wing (on the left) which was originally a residential property completed in around 1705. The central section was erected and attached to the house in 1775, so enabling the enlarged structure to be used as a school. Around the same time, a north-eastern wing (on the right), subsequently known as Dolphin Cottage, was erected. The two wings were harled and painted in the same colour so enabling symmetry to be established. In the original design, the central section featured an external staircase with stone balustrades leading up to a square headed doorway on the first floor; the outer bays of the central section were fenestrated by sash windows on both floors and the section was surmounted by a pediment with an oculus in the tympanum. There was a cupola behind the pediment.

In the early 1880s, the parish council decided to rebuild the central section to celebrate the Golden Jubilee of Queen Victoria. The enhanced section was designed in the neoclassical style, built in red sandstone stone and was completed in 1884. In the new design, the central bay, which slightly projected forward, featured a longer staircase rising less steeply and leading up to a more elaborate round headed doorway with a fanlight, voussoirs and a hood mould. Above the doorway, there was a clock tower with a pair of louvres, a set of clock faces and a cornice. The clock tower was surmounted a pyramid-shaped roof with a ventilator, a small spire and a weather vane. The outer bays of the section remained fenestrated by sash windows on the ground floor but now featured tall round headed windows on the first floor. The clock for the tower was donated by the factor of the Yester House Estate, Peter Burn Swinton. Internally, the principal room was the main assembly hall behind the clock tower.

The stone shaft on the 18th century mercat cross in front of the town hall was replaced in 1954. The building remained in private ownership until 1979 when it was acquired by a charity, the Feuars of Gifford. It was then leased at a notional annual rental to the Gifford Community Association, which initiated an extensive refurbishment programme in 1981. The main assembly hall then became a community events venue and also saw use as a creche, a classroom and a gym. A further programme of works to install a wheelchair lift in the complex was completed in 2017.

== See also ==
- List of listed buildings in Yester, East Lothian
