= Broun baronets =

Branch of the ancient Broun of Coulston family based in East Lothian

The Broun baronetcy of Colstoun is a title created on 16 February 1686 in the Baronetage of Nova Scotia for Patrick Broun. The family are a branch of the ancient Brouns of Coulston whose estate near Haddington, East Lothian, remains to this day in the possession of a cadet family.

== Origins ==
Early in the twelfth century a Walterus le Brun flourished in Scotland. He was one of the barons who witnessed the inquisition of the possessions of the church of Glasgow made by Earl David in 1116, in the reign of his brother, Alexander I of Scotland. Sir David le Brun was one of the witnesses, with King David I of Scotland, in laying the foundation of Holyrood Abbey on 13 May 1128. He devised to that abbey certain "lands and acres in territories de Colstoun" for prayers to be said for "the soul of (King) Alexander, and the health of his son."

== Colstoun pear ==
Possibly the most well-known thing about this family is not their glorious history of service to Scotland, but the famous Colstoun Pear, which Hugo de Gifford of Yester (died 1267), famed for his necromantic powers, described in Marmion, was supposed to have invested with the extraordinary virtue of conferring unfailing prosperity on the family which possessed it. – William Anderson, 1867

George Broun of Colstoun married Marion Hay (died 1564), second daughter of Sir John Hay, 2nd Lord Hay of Yester, ancestor of the Marquess of Tweeddale, and she brought with her the pear as dowry. Lord Yester, in handing over the pear told his new son-in-law that as long as it was preserved the family would flourish until the end of time. Accordingly, the pear has been carefully preserved in a silver box as a sacred palladium. Many writers comment upon the pear: Lord Fountainhall relates that in September 1670 he called upon the Brouns "who talk much of their antiquity and pear they preserve." Fountainhall's descendant, Sir Thomas Dick Lauder, refers to the story of the pear as something "which we cannot pass over" and mentions that "one of the ladies of the family took a longing for the forbidden fruit while pregnant and inflicted upon it a deadly bite", following which a period of dire financial crises affected the family and the pear turned rock hard, the teeth-marks still preserved. Martine also mentions it: "the legend of the Colstoun enchanted pear, still preserved, has been long known in the history of the Brouns of Colstoun.""

== Baronetcy ==
George Broun, feudal baron of Colstoun in the reign of King Charles I, married a daughter of Sir David Murray of Stanhope and had, with a younger son George (ancestor of the present-day baronets), to whom he granted by charter the barony of Thornydyke, an elder son – Sir Patrick Broun, 1st Baronet, who was created a Baronet of Nova Scotia on 16 February 1686, with a remainder to his heirs male forever.

His eldest son and heir Sir George Broun, 2nd Baronet (died 1718), married a daughter of George Mackenzie, 1st Earl of Cromartie, and died without issue. The estate was inherited by his niece Jean, daughter of his brother Robert, who along with his two sons predeceased the 2nd baronet in an accident. The baronetcy went to the male heir.

The family thus became split between the heirs male and the heirs of line, the title devolving upon the Broun of Thornydyke family in Berwickshire, and the estates upon the heiress who married George Broun of Eastfield, again uniting older strands of the same family. When the Thornydyke line became extinct with the death of the 5th Baronet in 1775 the title passed to the Rev Richard Broun, Minister of Kingarth and Lochmaben, who never used the title, grandfather of Sir Richard Broun 8th Baronet,'The Baronet's Champion'.

== Incumbents ==
Arms of the Chief of clan Broun, The Broun of Coultson, Baronet of Colstoun

- Sir Patrick Broun, 1st Baronet (c. 1630–1688)
- Sir George Broun, 2nd Baronet (died 1718)
- Sir George Broun, 3rd Baronet (died 1734)
- Sir Alexander Broun, 4th Baronet (died 1750)
- Sir Alexander Broun, 5th Baronet (died 1776)
- Sir Richard Broun, 6th Baronet (died 1781)
- Sir James Broun, 7th Baronet (1768–1844)
- Sir Richard Broun, 8th Baronet (1801–1858)
- Sir William Broun, 9th Baronet (1804–1882)
- Sir William Broun, 10th Baronet (1848–1918)
- Sir James Lionel Broun, 11th Baronet (1875–1962)
- Sir Lionel John Law Broun, 12th Baronet (1927–1995)
- Sir William Windsor Broun, 13th Baronet (1917–2007)
- Sir Wayne Broun, 14th Baronet (born 1952)

The heir apparent is the present holder's son Richard Haddington Broun (born 1984).
