= John Hay, 2nd Lord Hay of Yester =

Scottish nobleman (died 1513)

John Hay, 2nd Lord Hay of Yester (died 9 September 1513) was a Scottish nobleman killed at the Battle of Flodden, although his body was never recovered.

There is a song about him, "Lord Yester", with the words by George Weir and the music by Roy Williamson. It is based on the idea that people may have believed that he had gone to fight for his maker in foreign lands. It was sung by The Corries on their album "Live From Scotland Volume 2".

He was the son of John Hay, 1st Lord Hay of Yester (c. 1450 – after October 1508) and his wife Elizabeth (d. 1529), daughter of George Cunningham of Belton.

Peerage of Scotland
Preceded by John Hay	Lord Hay of Yester; 1508–1513	Succeeded by John Hay
