= William Hay, 6th Lord Hay of Yester =

Scottish noble

William Hay, 6th Lord Hay of Yester (died 1591) was a Scottish nobleman and courtier.

He was the son of William Hay, 5th Lord Hay of Yester and Margaret Kerr, daughter of John Kerr of Ferniehirst by his wife Catherine Kerr, daughter of Andrew Kerr of Cessford.

He became Lord Hay of Yester on the death of his father in 1586. He was nicknamed "Wood-Sword".

He was engaged in a feud with Sir John Stewart of Traquair in 1587, and imprisoned in Edinburgh Castle.

He died in 1591 and the next Lord was his brother James Hay, 7th Lord Hay of Yester.

== Family ==
He married Mary Maxwell (d. 1592) a daughter of John Maxwell, 4th Lord Herries of Terregles, by his wife Agnes Herries. Their children included:

- The Master of Yester (died circa 1591)
- Margaret Hay
- Joan Hay, married Alexander Horsburgh.
- Agnes Hay
- Christian Hay, married Archibald Newton of Newton
- Elizabeth Hay, married James Tweedie of Drumelzier
- Grizel Hay, married George Hepburn of Alderston

Peerage of Scotland
Preceded by William Hay	Lord Hay of Yester; 1586–1591	Succeeded by James Hay
