= Bruce Tree =

Historical oak tree in Dunbartonshire, Scotland

Coordinates: 55.969°N 4.572°W

- Species: Oak
- Location: Strathleven House, Dunbartonshire, Scotland
- Date seeded: circa 1000–1300 AD
- Date felled: May 2004 (arson)
- Custodian: Strathleven Artizans

The Bruce Tree was an oak tree that stood on the grounds of Strathleven House in Dunbartonshire, Scotland. It is reputed to have been planted by Robert the Bruce and was between 700 and 1,000 years old when it fell from an arson attack in May 2004. The timber from the tree was saved and used to form a replica of the Bruce's throne.

== The Bruce Tree ==
The Bruce Tree was an oak tree that stood in the grounds of Strathleven House, Dunbartonshire, Scotland. This estate was owned by a young Robert the Bruce, before he became King of Scotland; it is rumored that he planted the tree. By the early 21st century, the tree's trunk was 8.8 metres (29 ft) in girth and reached 5.5 metres (18 ft) in height. It was thought to have been between 700 and 1,000 years old and was one of the oldest oaks in Scotland. The tree was subject to an arson attack in May 2004, when a fire was lit within its trunk, and it fell the same month.

A local history society, the Strathleven Artizans, originally made the connection between the tree and Robert the Bruce and took custody of its timber. The trunk was cut up, and members of the society claimed to be able to see the face of the Bruce in its cross section. A petrified acorn was also found in the timber. The society planned to carve a heart out of the oak to take to the Church of the Holy Sepulchre in Jerusalem. It was one of the Bruce's last requests that his heart be taken there by his champion James Douglas, Lord of Douglas, as he had not been able to fulfil his wish go on a crusade to the Holy Land. However, whilst carrying the heart, Douglas was killed in battle against the Moors at the Battle of Teba in 1330, so was unable to complete the task.

== Throne ==
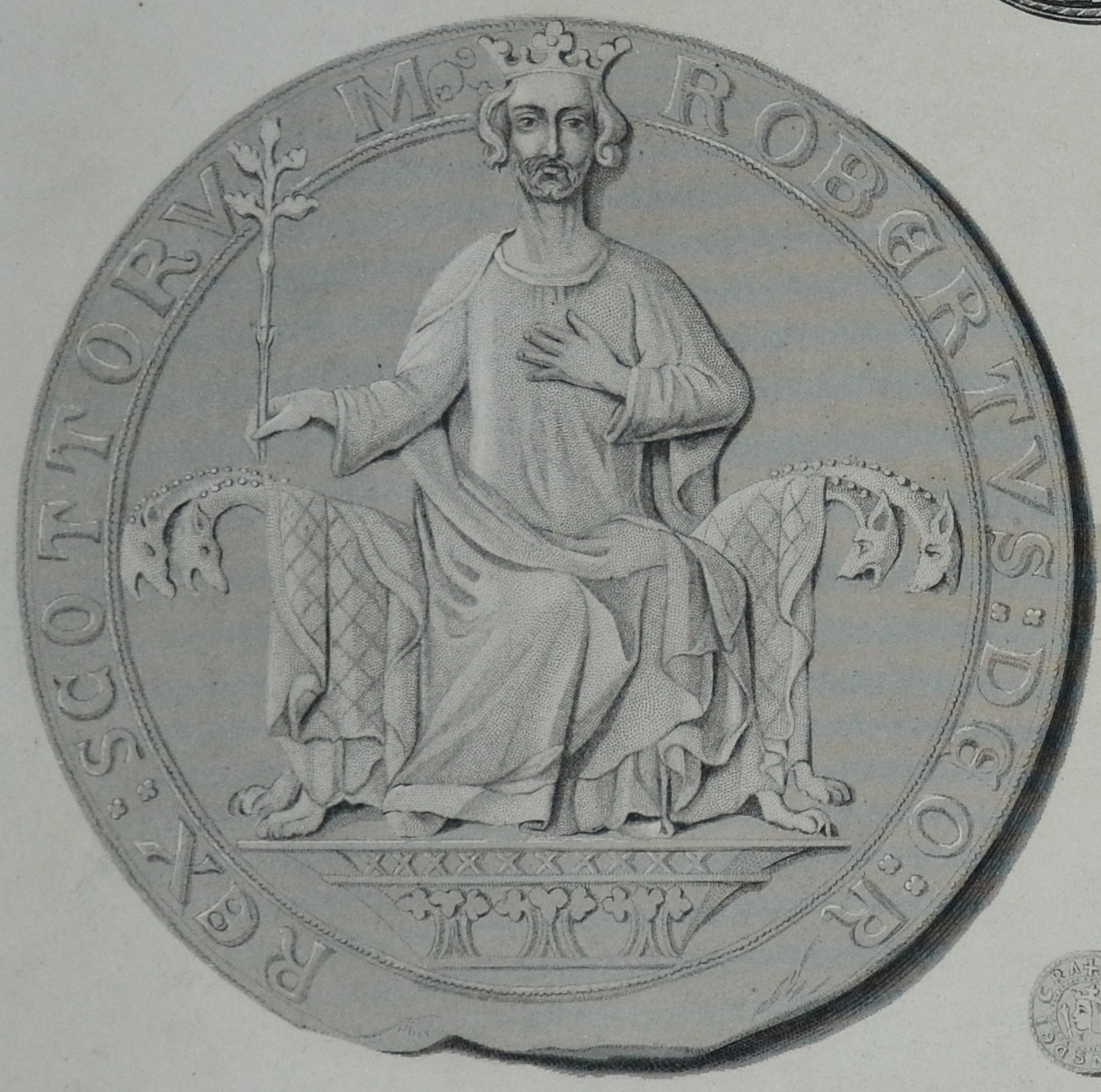
Robert the Bruce on throne as depicted on his seal

The Strathleven Artizans also used some of the timber from the oak to construct a replica of Robert Bruce's throne. The inspiration came from a depiction of Bruce sitting on a throne on his royal seal. The carving was carried out by John Donaldson and an expert from Historic Scotland, taking eight years to complete. The throne also incorporates yew from a tree at Elderslie, the birthplace of William Wallace – another Scottish patriot, and ancient olive wood from Teba. The throne has four beast heads at the ends of the arms and clawed feet.

The throne was unveiled at Dunfermline Abbey by Andrew Bruce, 11th Earl of Elgin. It was later displayed at the Battle of Bannockburn visitor's centre at the Bannockburn Live event of 28–29 June 2014 to mark the 700th anniversary of the Bruce's victory.
