= Alexander McGill (architect) =

Scottish mason and architect

Alexander McGill (died 1734) was a Scottish mason and architect, who worked in partnership with fellow architect James Smith. His work was influenced by that of Sir William Bruce, and some of his designs later appeared in William Adam's Vitruvius Scoticus.

The son of George McGill, a mason in Arbirlot, Angus, he was apprenticed in June 1697 to Alexander Nisbet, a mason in Edinburgh. By 1710 he had been admitted into the mason's lodge, and he is known to have visited London on at least one occasion (in 1717).

From 1699 McGill was involved on work at Kellie Castle, Angus, in association with Alexander Edward, and from 1700 with Smith at Yester House in East Lothian. At the House of Nairn, McGill completed William Bruce's design after the latter's death.

His own designs include those of Donibristle House in Fife, Blair Drummond (1715–17), which was demolished in 1870, and a town house for James Graham, 1st Duke of Montrose in Glasgow's Drygate (demolished 1855). McGill designed the original Mount Stuart House on the Isle of Bute for John Stuart, 3rd Earl of Bute, which was later remodelled by William Adam, before burning down, leaving only McGill's pavilions.

McGill also designed several churches, including the New Kirk in Dumfries, and Newbattle Parish Church (1727).

In November 1720 McGill became the first City Architect of Edinburgh, with a salary of £50 a year, at least until the pay was discontinued during lean times in 1725. He carried out various minor public works in the city, until 1729 after which no further mention of him occurs in the city records.
