= John Hay, 1st Earl of Tweeddale =

Scottish aristocrat

John Hay, 1st Earl of Tweeddale (1593–1653) was a Scottish aristocrat.

Hay was the son of James Hay, 7th Lord Hay of Yester and Margaret Kerr or Ker, eldest daughter of Sir John Ker of Ferniehirst. He became the 8th Lord Hay of Yester in February 1609. The family home was Bothans at Yester.

He married Jean Seton, a daughter of Alexander Seton, 1st Earl of Dunfermline and Grizel Leslie.

The courtier Robert Kerr came to Scotland in June 1629. He brought a gift from Charles I to Lady Yester as a wedding gift, a jewelled hair-dressing described as a "head busk", a band of small diamonds set in fleur-de-lis to wear at the forehead from ear to ear. He mentioned Charles' gratitude to her mother Lady Seton for looking after him as a child at Dunfermline Palace.

They had a son, John Hay, 1st Marquess of Tweeddale, who married Jean Scott. Jean Seton, Lady Yester died eight days after the birth.

Lord Yester opposed the Act anent Apparel in 1633 and in 1639 was supporter of the National Covenant and had a regiment at Duns Law.

John Hay married secondly, in 1642, Margaret Montgomerie (1617-1665), a daughter of Alexander Montgomerie, 6th Earl of Eglinton and Anne Livingstone. Their son was William Hay of Drumelzier. He married Elizabeth Seton, a daughter of Alexander Seton, 1st Viscount of Kingston in 1694. He acquired Duns Castle and a part of a necklace or girdle associated with Mary, Queen of Scots which had descended in the Seton family from a royal gift to Mary Seton or Anne Livingstone. The necklace is now displayed at Holyrood Palace.

John Hay was made Earl of Tweeddale in 1646.

After his death in 1653, his widow Margaret Montgomerie married William Cunningham, 9th Earl of Glencairn.
