= Yester House =

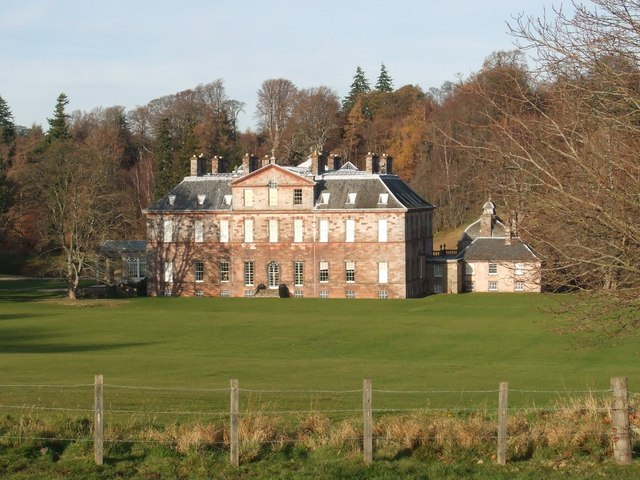
- South front of Yester House

- Location of Yester House in East Lothian
- 55.8954°N 2.7314°W
- Location: Gifford, East Lothian, Scotland

History
- Built for: Marquess of Tweeddale

Site notes
- Architect(s): James Smith, William Adam
- Architectural style: Palladian

Listed Building – Category A
- Designated: 5 February 1971
- Reference no.: LB14693

Inventory of Gardens and Designed Landscapes in Scotland
- Official name: Yester House
- Criteria: Work of Art; Historical; Architectural
- Designated: 30 June 1987
- Reference no.: GDL00388

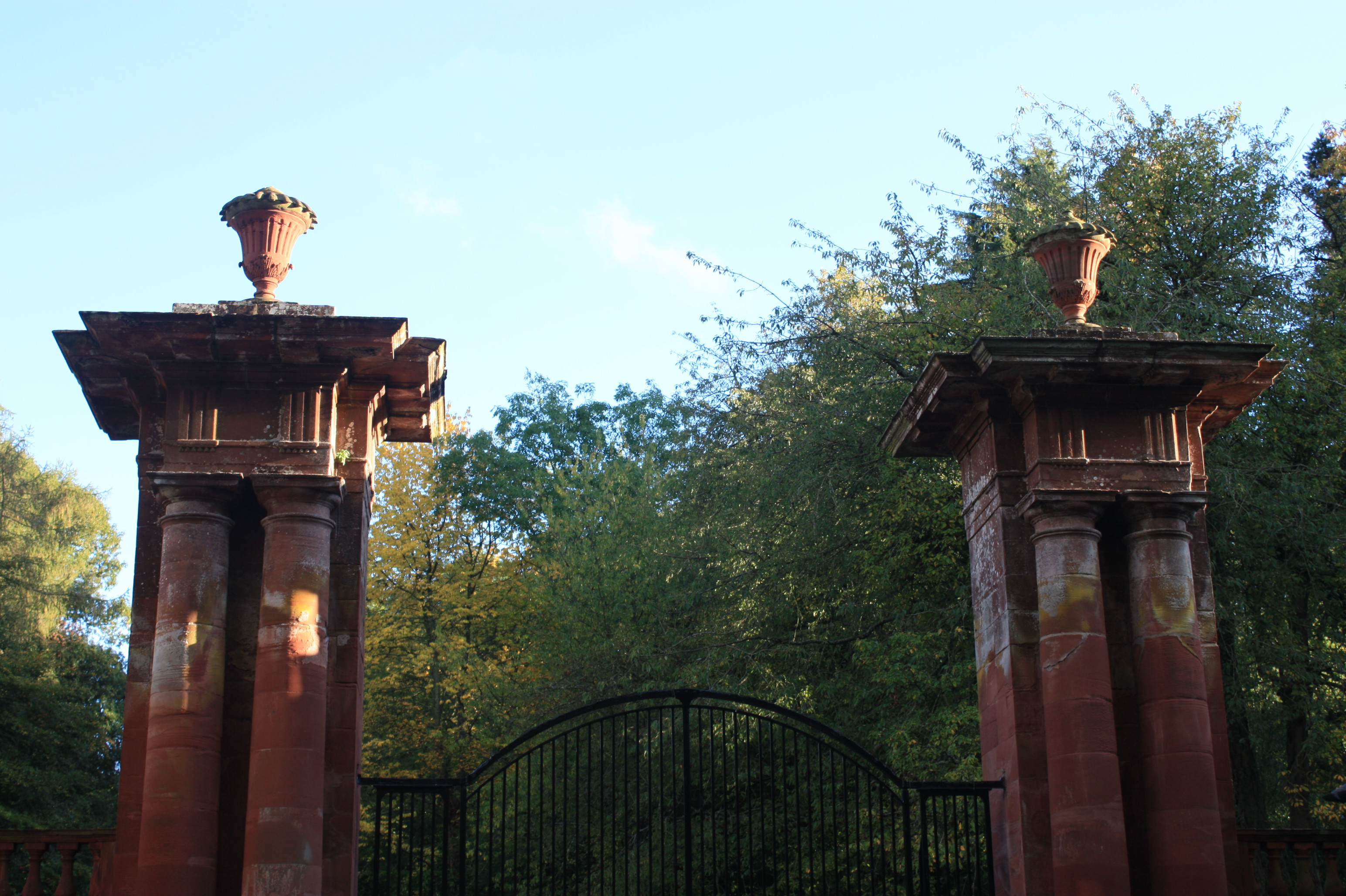
The western gate-posts, Yester House

Yester House is an early 18th-century mansion near Gifford in East Lothian, Scotland. It was the home of the Hay family, later Marquesses of Tweeddale, from the 15th century until the late 1960s. Construction of the present house began in 1699, and continued well into the 18th century in a series of building phases. It is now protected as a category A listed building, and the grounds of the house are included in the Inventory of Gardens and Designed Landscapes in Scotland, the national listing of significant gardens.

== History ==
The lands of Yester were granted to Hugo de Giffard, a Norman, in the 12th century. Yester Castle, around 1 mile (1.6 km) south-east of the present house, was built by the Giffords in the later 13th century.

The heiress of the Giffords married into the Hay family, who were raised to the peerage in 1488 as Lord Hay of Yester. In 1646 the 8th Lord Hay was created Earl of Tweeddale, and considered the building of a new house at Yester. The 1st Earl acquired his title for his support of Charles I, but later served in two Commonwealth Parliaments. His son, the 2nd Earl of Tweeddale, was appointed to the Privy Council of Scotland after the Restoration. He began improvements to the estate, including the planting of over 6,000 acres (2,400 ha) of woodland. It was around this time that the medieval village of Yester was moved to its current location at Gifford. The Earl consulted Sir William Bruce in 1670, with a view to commissioning a new house, although nothing was done at this time. From 1676 Yester was the second Scottish estate (after Lennoxlove) to practice "enclosure" adding eight miles of stone walls to enclose the woodlands.

Formal gardens were established and parkland laid out through the 1680s and 1690s. These Versailles-inspired gardens were removed in the 1750s in reaction to the new fashion of open parkland.

For his support of William of Orange, the 2nd Earl was appointed Lord Chancellor of Scotland in 1692 and 1st Marquess of Tweeddale in 1694. John Hay, 2nd Marquess of Tweeddale, who inherited the estate in 1697, appointed James Smith and Alexander McGill to begin work on a new house in 1697. The 2nd Marquess supported the Acts of Union and served at Westminster as a Scottish representative peer. When he died in 1713 the building work was still underway; the main house was complete by 1715, when the 3rd Marquess died.

John Hay, 4th Marquess of Tweeddale, also served as a representative peer from 1722. The interior of the house was complete by 1728, but in 1729 the 4th Marquess appointed William Adam to make alterations to the roof and main façade, and in the mid-1730s to the interiors. William was succeeded as architect at Yester by his sons Robert and John, who carried out alterations inside in 1761, and another redesign of the façade in the 1780s, as well as redesigning the gardens in an informal style in the 1760s. The house was altered in the 1830s, with the entrance moved to the west front, and was modernised at the end of the 19th century by Robert Rowand Anderson for the 11th Marquess.

The estate was sold in the late 1960s after the death of William Hay, 11th Marquess of Tweeddale, in 1967, to two antiques dealers. In 1972 it was bought by the Italian composer Gian Carlo Menotti because of the acoustics of the ballroom. Famously Lee Trevino rented the house while winning his second Open Golf Championship in 1972. After Menotti's death, the house was marketed by his family with a price of between £12 million and £15 million. According to the sales particulars the house has a gross internal area of 3,213 square metres (34,580 sq ft). In September 2010 the guide price was reduced to £8 million, with the exclusion of 120 hectares (300 acres) of woodlands from the sale. In 2015 the estate was sold to Nicola and Gareth Wood, son of Sir Ian Wood.
