= Clan Broun =

Noble family

- Mac a' Bhriuthainn, MacIlledhuinn.
- Motto: FLOREAT MAGESTAS

Profile
- Region: Lowlands
- District: East Lothian

Chief
- Sir Wayne Broun of Colstoun
- 14th Baronet of Colstoun
- Seat: Colstoun House near Haddington, East Lothian
- Historic seat: Carsluith Castle

Clan Broun, also known as Clan Brown, is a Scottish clan.

== History ==
=== Origins of the Name ===
The more usual form of the surname Broun is Brown. It is an extremely common name and is usually a reference to colouring. The historian, Black, asserts that Browns of Celtic origin might have been named after their descent from native judges, who were known as brehons.

The Scottish Lowland name of Brown achieved prominence in the early twelfth century in East Lothian. Sir David Le Brun was a witness to the laying of the foundation of Holyrood Abbey in 1128. He had given lands to the abbey in return for prayers said for the health of his son.

The chiefly family, the Brouns of Colstoun enjoyed considerable royal favour, which may have been because of their claimed descent from the royal house of France. The chief's arms even bear the three gold lilies of France. The family married into other noble families such as that of the chiefs of Clan Hay.

During the Civil War, Sir John Brown of Fordell commanded the royalist army at the Battle of Inverkeithing in 1651. Patrick Broun of Colstoun was created a Baronet of Nova Scotia in 1686.

== Clan profile ==
- Clan Chief: Sir Wayne Broun of Colstoun, 14th Baronet of Colstoun, Chief of the Name and Arms of Broun
  - Chief's Arms: Gules, a chevron between three fleur-de-lis or
  - Chief's Crest: A lion rampant, holding in the dexter paw a fleur-de-lis or
  - Chief's Motto: Floreat majestas (let majesty flourish)
- Tartans: Clan Broun of Coulston, Clan Brown of Castledean, Clan Brown Military Watch, Clan Brown Dress Watch

== Clan Castles ==
Seats of the Clan Broun have included: Bruntsfield House and Carsluith Castle.

== See also ==
- Scottish clan
