= Marquess of Tweeddale =

Scottish peerage

Marquessate of Tweeddale
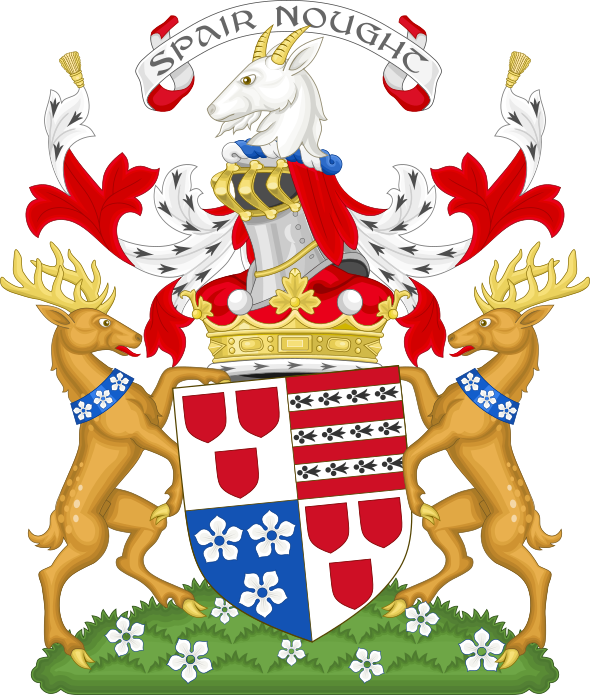
- Arms: Quarterly: 1st & 4th, Argent, three Escutcheons Gules (Hay); 2nd, Gules, three Bars Ermine (Gifford); 3rd, Azure, three Cinquefoils Argent (Fraser). Crest: A Goat's Head erased Argent, armed Or. Supporters: On either side a Buck proper, attired and unguled Or, each gorged with a Collar Azure, charged with three Cinquefoils Argent.
- Creation date: 17 December 1694
- Created by: Mary II & William II
- Peerage: Peerage of Scotland
- First holder: John Hay, 1st Marquess of Tweeddale
- Present holder: Charles David Montagu Hay, 14th Marquess of Tweeddale
- Heir presumptive: Lord Alistair Hay, Master of Tweeddale
- Remainder to: The 1st Marquess' heirs male whatsoever
- Subsidiary titles: Earl of Tweeddale; Earl of Gifford; Viscount of Walden; Lord Hay of Yester; Baron Tweeddale (United Kingdom)
- Status: Extant
- Former seat: Yester House
- Motto: SPAIR NOUGHT

Marquess of Tweeddale (sometimes spelled Tweedale) is a title of the Peerage of Scotland, created in 1694 for the 2nd Earl of Tweeddale. Lord Tweeddale holds the subsidiary titles of Earl of Tweeddale (created 1646), Earl of Gifford (1694), Viscount of Walden (1694), Lord Hay of Yester (1488), and Baron Tweeddale, of Yester in the County of Haddington (1881), all but the last in the Peerage of Scotland. As Baron Tweeddale in the Peerage of the United Kingdom, Lord Tweeddale sat between 1881 and 1963 in the House of Lords. The Marquess's eldest son uses Viscount Walden as a courtesy title.

Lord Tweeddale also holds the title of Hereditary Chamberlain of Dunfermline.

The family seat was Yester House, near Gifford, East Lothian, Scotland.

== Lords Hay of Yester (1488) ==
- John Hay, 1st Lord Hay of Yester (c. 1450–1508)
- John Hay, 2nd Lord Hay of Yester (k. Battle of Flodden 1513)
- John Hay, 3rd Lord Hay of Yester (d. 1543)
- John Hay, 4th Lord Hay of Yester (d. 1557)
- William Hay, 5th Lord Hay of Yester (d. 1586)
- William Hay, 6th Lord Hay of Yester (d. 1591)
- James Hay, 7th Lord Hay of Yester (d. 1609)
- John Hay, 8th Lord Hay of Yester (1593–1653) (created Earl of Tweeddale in 1646)

== Earls of Tweeddale (1646) ==
- John Hay, 1st Earl of Tweeddale (1593–1653)
- John Hay, 2nd Earl of Tweeddale (1626–1697) (created Marquess of Tweeddale in 1694)

== Marquesses of Tweeddale (1694) ==
- John Hay, 1st Marquess of Tweeddale, 2nd Earl of Tweeddale, 1st Earl of Gifford, 1st Viscount Walden (1626–1697)
- John Hay, 2nd Marquess of Tweeddale, 3rd Earl of Tweeddale, 2nd Earl of Gifford, 2nd Viscount Walden (1645–1713)
- Charles Hay, 3rd Marquess of Tweeddale, 4th Earl of Tweeddale, 3rd Earl of Gifford, 3rd Viscount Walden (1670–1715)
- John Hay, 4th Marquess of Tweeddale, 5th Earl of Tweeddale, 4th Earl of Gifford, 4th Viscount Walden (1695–1762)
- George Hay, 5th Marquess of Tweeddale, 6th Earl of Tweeddale, 5th Earl of Gifford, 5th Viscount Walden (1758–1770)
- George Hay, 6th Marquess of Tweeddale, 7th Earl of Tweeddale, 6th Earl of Gifford, 6th Viscount Walden (1700–1787)
- George Hay, 7th Marquess of Tweeddale, 8th Earl of Tweeddale, 7th Earl of Gifford, 7th Viscount Walden (1753–1804)
- George Hay, 8th Marquess of Tweeddale, 9th Earl of Tweeddale, 8th Earl of Gifford, 8th Viscount Walden (1787–1876)
- Arthur Hay, 9th Marquess of Tweeddale, 10th Earl of Tweeddale, 9th Earl of Gifford, 9th Viscount Walden (1824–1878)
- William Montagu Hay, 10th Marquess of Tweeddale, 11th Earl of Tweeddale, 10th Earl of Gifford, 10th Viscount Walden, 1st Baron Tweeddale (1826–1911)
- William George Montagu Hay, 11th Marquess of Tweeddale, 12th Earl of Tweeddale, 11th Earl of Gifford, 11th Viscount Walden, 2nd Baron Tweeddale (1884–1967)
- David George Montagu Hay, 12th Marquess of Tweeddale, 13th Earl of Tweeddale, 12th Earl of Gifford, 12th Viscount Walden, 3rd Baron Tweeddale (1921–1979)
- Edward Douglas John Hay, 13th Marquess of Tweeddale, 14th Earl of Tweeddale, 13th Earl of Gifford, 13th Viscount Walden, 4th Baron Tweeddale (1947–2005)
- Charles David Montagu Hay, 14th Marquess of Tweeddale, 15th Earl of Tweeddale, 14th Earl of Gifford, 14th Viscount Walden, 5th Baron Tweeddale (b. 1947)

== Present peer ==
Charles David Montagu Hay, 14th Marquess of Tweeddale (born 6 August 1947) is the son of the 12th Marquess and his wife Sonia Mary Peake, daughter of Osbert Peake, 1st Viscount Ingleby and Lady Joan Rachel de Vere Capell. He was educated at Milton Abbey School and Trinity College, Oxford. In February 2005 he succeeded his twin brother as Marquess of Tweeddale (1694), Earl of Tweeddale (1646), Baron Tweeddale of Yester (1881), Earl of Gifford (1694), Viscount of Walden (1694), and Lord Hay of Yester (1488).

The heir presumptive is the present holder's brother Lord Alistair Hay (b. 1955), whose heir presumptive is his half-brother Lord Andrew Arthur George Hay (b. 1959), whose heir apparent is his son Angus David George Hay (b. 1991).

== Coat of Arms ==
Arms of the Lord Hay of Yester

Arms of the Earls of Tweeddale and the 1st-10th Marquesses of Tweeddale

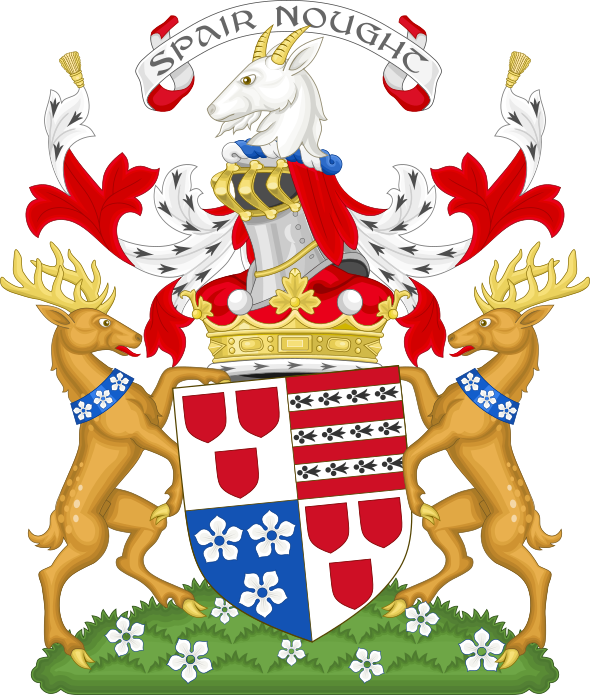
Arms from the 11th Marquess of Tweeddale

== Family tree and succession ==
Marquesses of Tweeddale (1694), Earls of Tweeddale (1646), Lords Hay of Yester (1488)

Lord Hay of Yester, 1488
Mariot Lindsay	John Hay (d. c. 1508); 1st Lord Hay of Yester	Elizabeth Cunningham (d. 1529)
Thomas Hay (d. 1491); Master of Yester	John Hay (d. 1513); 2nd Lord Hay of Yester
Thomas Hay (d. c. 1508); Master of Yester	John Hay (d. 1543); 3rd Lord Hay of Yester
John Hay (d. c. 1555–56); 4th Lord Hay of Yester
William Hay (1538–1586); 5th Lord Hay of Yester
William Hay (c. 1561-1590/91); 6th Lord Hay of Yester	James Hay (1564-1608/09); 7th Lord Hay of Yester
Earl of Tweeddale, 1646
John Hay; 1st Earl of Tweeddale, 8th Lord Hay of Yester
Marquess of Tweeddale, Earl of Gifford, and Viscount of Walden, 1694
John Hay (1626–1697); 1st Marquess of Tweeddale, etc., 2nd Earl of Tweeddale, 9th Lord Hay of Yester
John Hay (1645–1713); 2nd Marquess of Tweeddale, etc., 3rd Earl of Tweeddale, 10th Lord Hay of Yester
Charles Hay (c. 1670–1715); 3rd Marquess of Tweeddale, etc., 4th Earl of Tweeddale, 11th Lord Hay of Yester	John Hay (d. 1706)	William Hay (d. 1723)
John Hay (c. 1695–1762); 4th Marquess of Tweeddale, etc., 5th Earl of Tweeddale, 12th Lord Hay of Yester	Charles Hay (d. 1760)	George Hay (c. 1700–1787); 6th Marquess of Tweeddale, etc., 7th Earl of Tweeddale, 14th Lord Hay of Yester	John Hay of Newhall (d. 1765)
George Hay (1758–1770); 5th Marquess of Tweeddale, etc., 6th Earl of Tweeddale, 13th Lord Hay of Yester	William Hay (d. 1761); Younger of Newhall	George Hay (1739–1804); 7th Marquess of Tweeddale, etc., 8th Earl of Tweeddale, 15th Lord Hay of Yester
George Hay (1787–1876); 8th Marquess of Tweeddale, etc., 9th Earl of Tweeddale, 16th Lord Hay of Yester	James Hay (Note: The line of James Hay (1788–1862) is the next in the line of succession should the male line of the 12th Marquess fail. The current heir male of this line is Malcolm Charles Hay of Seaton (b. 1956)) (1788–1862)
Baron Tweeddale of Yester in the County of Haddington, 1881
George Hay (1822–1862) styled Earl of Gifford	Arthur Hay (1824–1878); 9th Marquess of Tweeddale, etc., 10th Earl of Tweeddale, 17th Lord Hay of Yester	William Montagu Hay (1826–1911); 10th Marquess of Tweeddale, etc., 11th Earl of Tweeddale, 18th Lord Hay of Yester, 1st Baron Tweeddale	James Gordon Hay (1815–1883)
William George Montagu Hay (1884–1967); 11th Marquess of Tweeddale, etc., 12th Earl of Tweeddale, 19th Lord Hay of Yester, 2nd Baron Tweeddale	Arthur Vincent Hay (1886–1914)	Edward Douglas John Hay (1888–1944)	Malcolm Vivian Hay of Seaton (1881–1962)
Sonia Mary Peake (d. 2009)	David George Montagu Hay (1921–1979); 12th Marquess of Tweeddale, etc., 13th Earl of Tweeddale, 20th Lord Hay of Yester, 3rd Baron Tweeddale	Nella Doreen Dutton (d. 2004)	James Malcolm Hay of Seaton (1907–1987)
Edward Douglas John Hay (1947–2005); 13th Marquess of Tweeddale, etc., 14th Earl of Tweeddale, 21st Lord Hay of Yester, 4th Baron Tweeddale	Charles David Hay (b. 1947); 14th Marquess of Tweeddale, etc., 15th Earl of Tweeddale, 21st Lord Hay of Yester, 5th Baron Tweeddale	Alistair James Montagu Hay (b. 1955)	Andrew Arthur George Hay (b. 1959) (Note: Andrew Arthur George Hay is second in the line of succession to the Marquessate as his half-brother, Alistair Hay, has no male issue and there is no further male issue from the 12th Marquess's marriage to his first wife.)	Lord Hamish David Montagu Hay (b. 1959)	Malcolm Charles Hay of Seaton (b. 1956)
Heir Presumptive
Angus Hay (b. 1991)	Rory Hay (b. 1993)	James Malcolm Douglas Hay (b. 1985)
Gilbert Christopher Malcolm Hay (b. 2021)

Line of succession (simplified)
- George Hay, 7th Marquess of Tweeddale (1753–1804)
  - George Hay, 8th Marquess of Tweeddale (1787–1876)
    - Arthur Hay, 9th Marquess of Tweeddale (1824–1878)
    - William Hay, 10th Marquess of Tweeddale (1826–1911)
      - William Hay, 11th Marquess of Tweeddale (1884–1967)
      - Lord Edward Douglas John Hay (1888–1944)
        - David Hay, 12th Marquess of Tweeddale (1921–1979)
          - Edward Hay, 13th Marquess of Tweeddale (1947–2005)
          - Charles Hay, 14th Marquess of Tweeddale (b. 1947)
          - (1). Alistair James Montagu Hay (b. 1955) (Note: Does not use his style of Lord.)
          - (2). Lord Andrew Arthur George Hay (b. 1959)
            - (3). Angus David George Hay (b. 1991)
              - (4). Hamish Andrew Gavan Hay (b. 2022)
              - (5). Archibald William Montagu Hay (b. 2024)
            - (6). Rory Edward Hamish Hay (b. 1993)
          - (7). Lord Hamish David Montagu Hay (b. 1959)
  - Lord James Hay (1788–1862)
    - James Gordon Hay (1815–1883)
      - Malcolm Vivian Hay of Seaton (1881–1962)
        - James Malcolm Hay of Seaton (1907–1987)
          - male issue and descendants in remainder
        - Peter Brian Hay (1918–2004)
          - male issue in remainder
      - Cuthbert Joseph Hay (1882–1970)
        - Ronald Cuthbert Hay (1916–2001)
          - male issue and descendants in remainder
        - John Malcolm Hay (1918–201?)
          - male issue and descendants in remainder

There are further heirs to the marquessate descended from the first Earl of Tweeddale.

== See also ==
- Clan Hay
- Yester House
