= John Hay, 1st Lord Hay of Yester =

John Hay, 1st Lord Hay of Yester (c. 1450 – after October 1508) is the ancestor of the Marquesses of Tweeddale. He was created a Lord of Parliament on 29 January 1488 by James III of Scotland.

He was born in Peebleshire, the son of Sir David Hay of Locherworth, Peebleshire, and later Yester in East Lothian (d. c. 1478) by his wife Elizabeth (b. c. 1400), daughter of George Douglas, 1st Earl of Angus (1370–1402) by Princess Mary (d. before 1458), daughter of Robert III, King of Scots.

The Hay of Locherworth (blazon of arms: Azure three inescutcheons Argent), a branch of Clan Hay (Argent three escutcheons Gules) began quartering the Fraser arms (Azure three cinquefoils Argent) in the early 14th century following marriage in the early 1300s of Sir Gilbert Hay of Locherworth to Mary Fraser, daughter and co-heiress of Sir Simon Fraser of Oliver Castle (blazoned Azure five fraises Argent two one two), whereby they eventually acquired Oliver Castle and Peeblesshire lands.

The Hay of Locherworth family began quartering the Gifford of Yester arms (Gules, three bars Ermine) in the late 14th or early 15th century. This followed the marriage of Sir Thomas Hay of Locherworth (who died around 1397) to Joanna, the heiress and daughter of Sir Hugh Gifford of Yester, which transferred the barony of Yester and the right to bear the Gifford arms to the House of Hay. Their son, Sir William Hay of Yester (who died around 1421–1428), displayed on his seals by 1420 three escutcheons (for Hay) first and fourth, quartering Gifford second and Fraser third, a practice confirmed by subsequent generations of the family of Hay of Yester, and recorded in early Scottish armorials.

John Hay of Yester married (1) Mary (d. c. 1467), daughter of John Lindsay, 1st Lord Lindsay of the Byres, and (2) by contract before 17 December 1468, Elizabeth (d. 1529), daughter of George Cunningham of Belton. There were children by both marriages:

- (1) Sir Thomas Hay, Master of Yester (d. 1491), who married Elizabeth (c. 1477–1544), daughter of Alexander Home, 2nd Lord Home, who later married James Hamilton, 1st Earl of Arran
- (1) Isabel, who married Sir Walter Ker of Cessford, & Caverton (d. c. 1601)
- (2) Sir John Hay, 2nd Lord Hay of Yester (killed at the Battle of Flodden)
- (2) George Hay of Menzion
- (2) Isabella, who married Sir Robert Lauder of The Bass, Knt
- (2) Margaret (d. c. 1525), married in 1491 to William Borthwick, 3rd Lord Borthwick (1460s – c. 1507)

Peerage of Scotland
New creation	Lord Hay of Yester; 1488–1508	Succeeded by John Hay
