= Gifford, East Lothian =

Coordinates: 55.903°N 2.745°W

Gifford
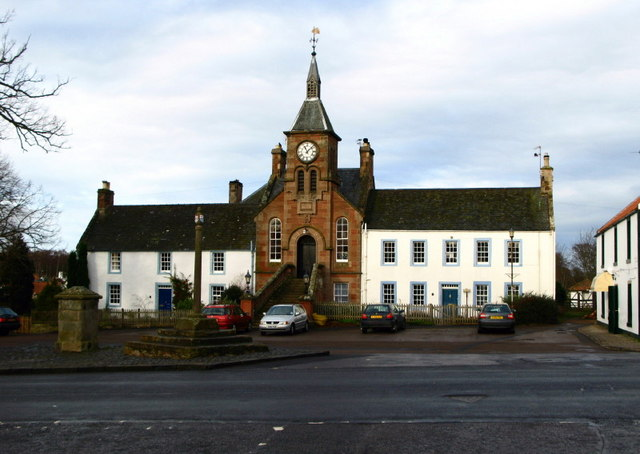
- Gifford Town Hall

- Location within East Lothian
- Population: 790 (2020)
- OS grid reference: NT534680
- Civil parish: Yester
- Council area: East Lothian
- Lieutenancy area: East Lothian
- Country: Scotland
- Sovereign state: United Kingdom
- Post town: HADDINGTON
- Postcode district: EH41
- Dialling code: 01620
- Police: Scotland
- Fire: Scottish
- Ambulance: Scottish
- UK Parliament: East Lothian
- Scottish Parliament: East Lothian

Gifford /ˈɡɪfərd/ is a village in the parish of Yester in East Lothian, Scotland. It lies approximately 4 miles (6.4 km) south of Haddington and 25 miles (40 km) east of Edinburgh.

It groups around the Colstoun Water (locally called Gifford Water) at the junction of the B6369 and B6355 surrounded by rural farmland.

== History ==
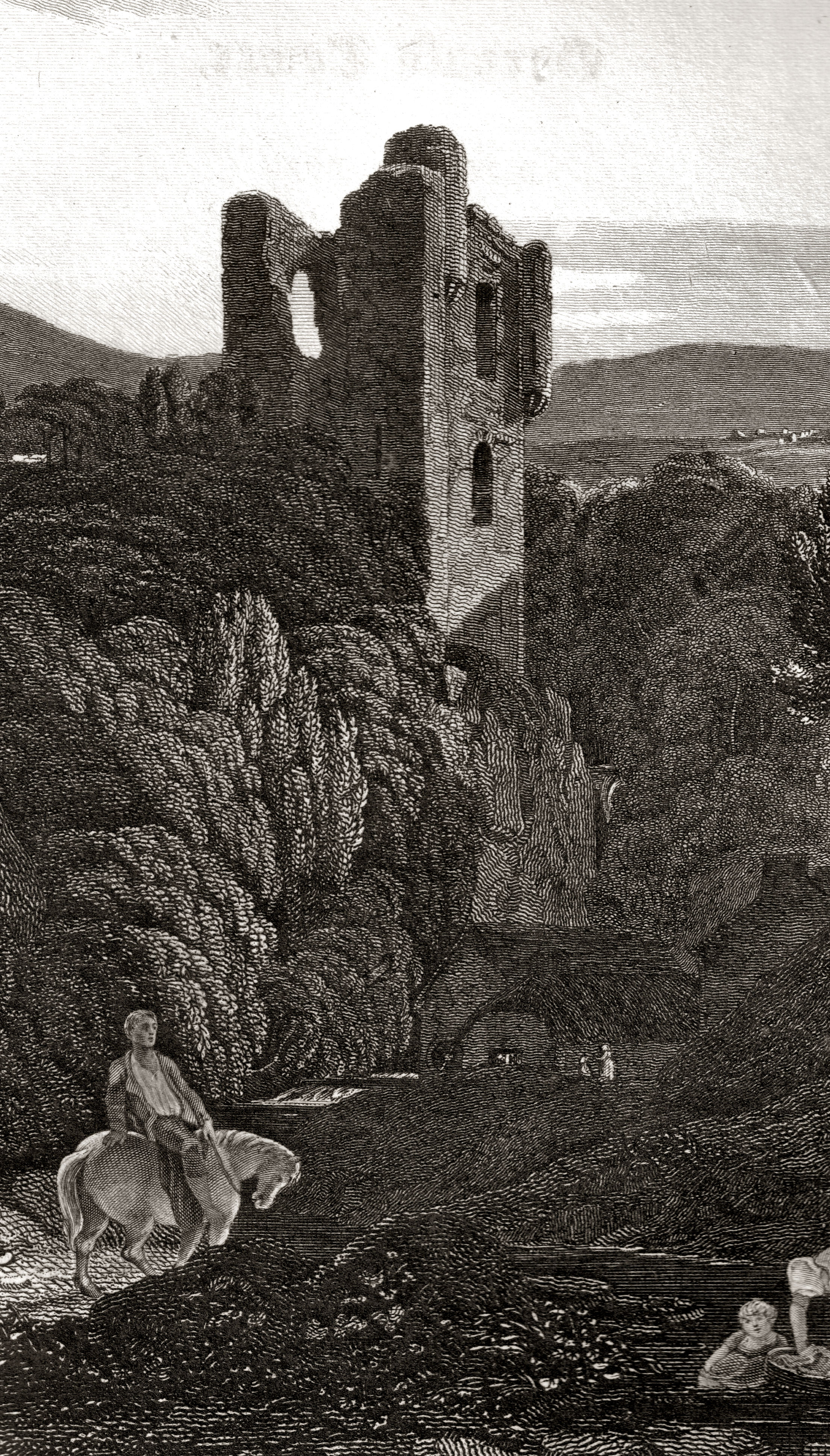
Yester Castle in 1814

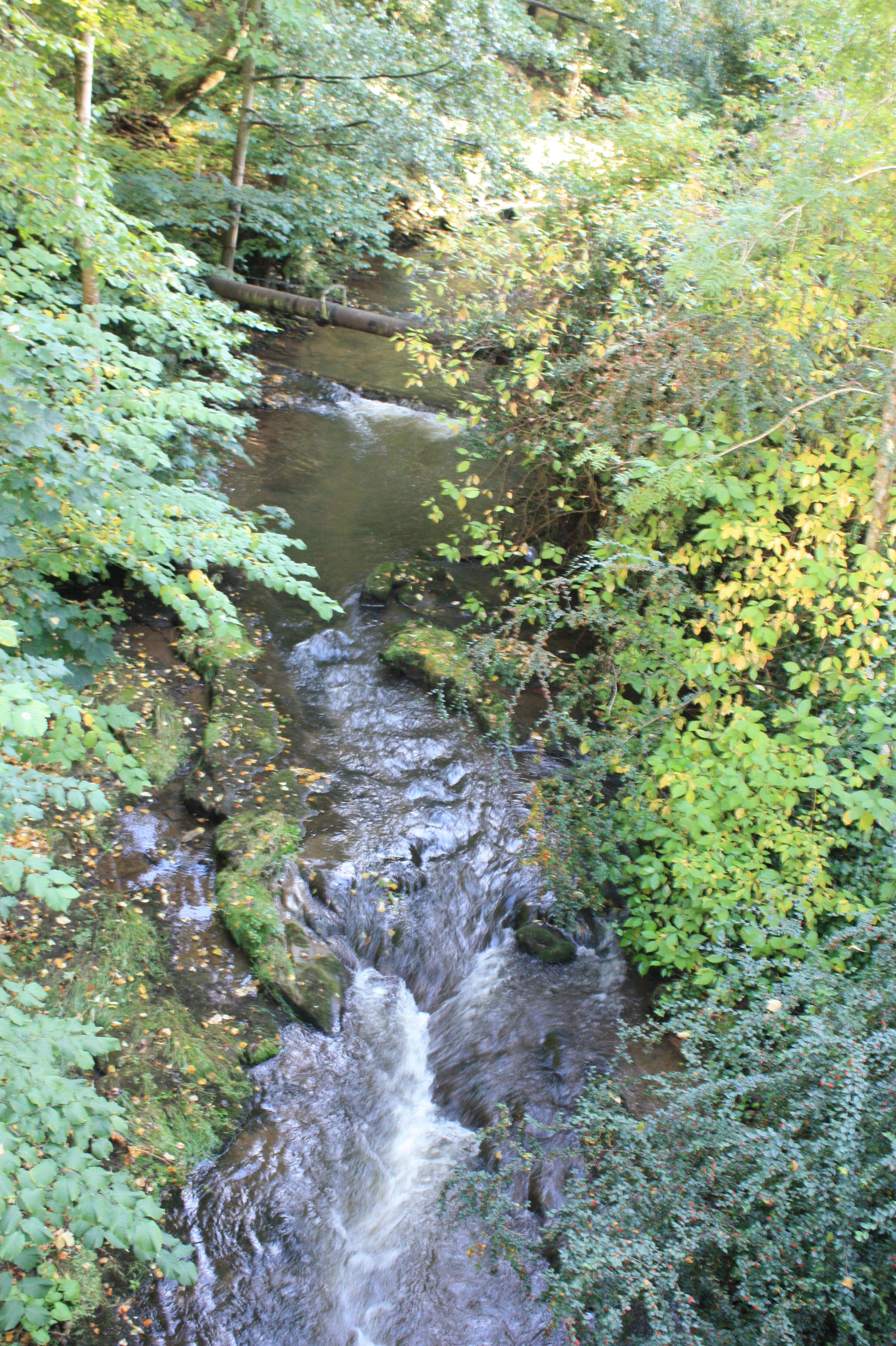
Colstoun Water at Gifford, East Lothian

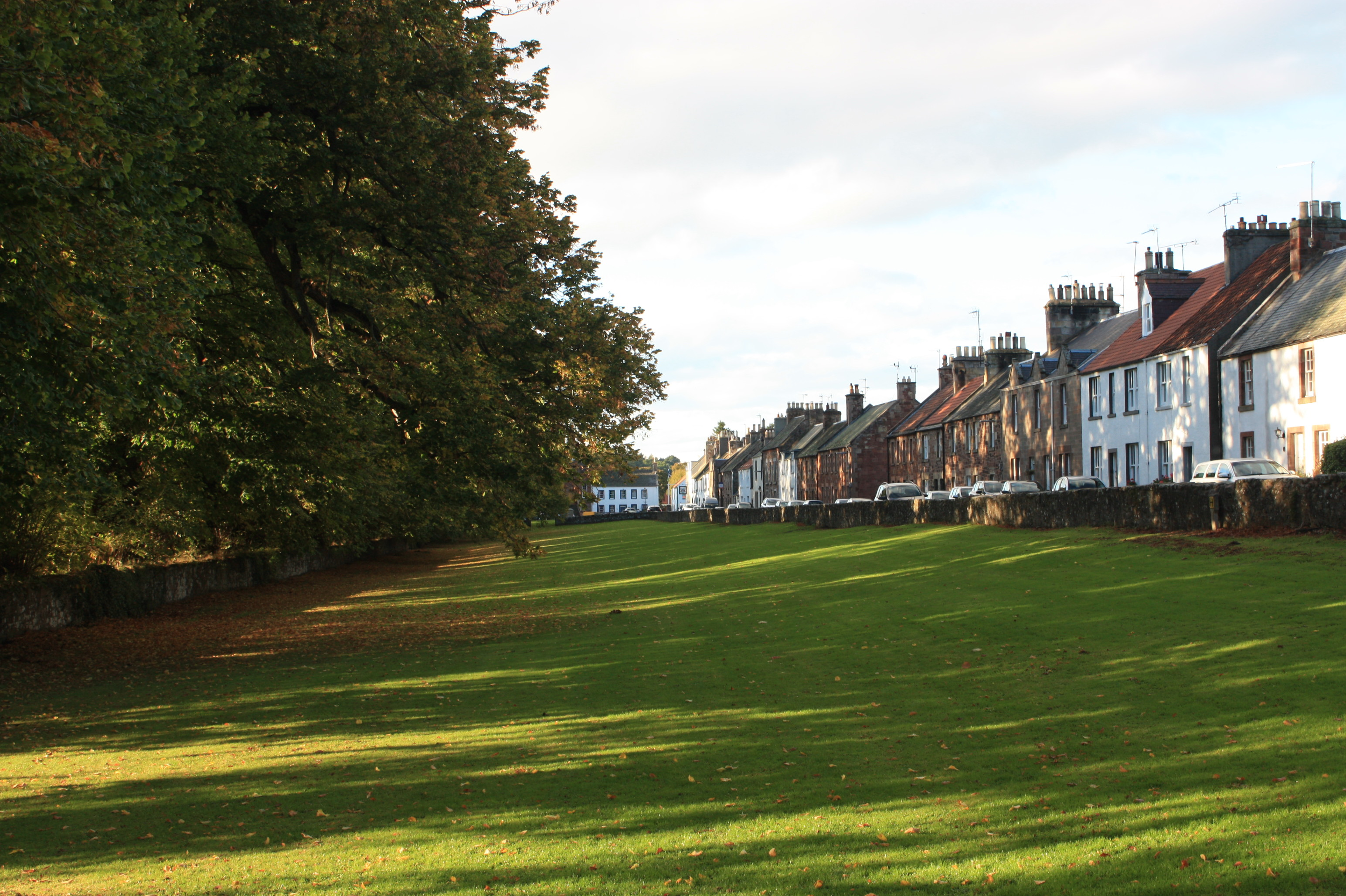
Common Green, Gifford, East Lothian

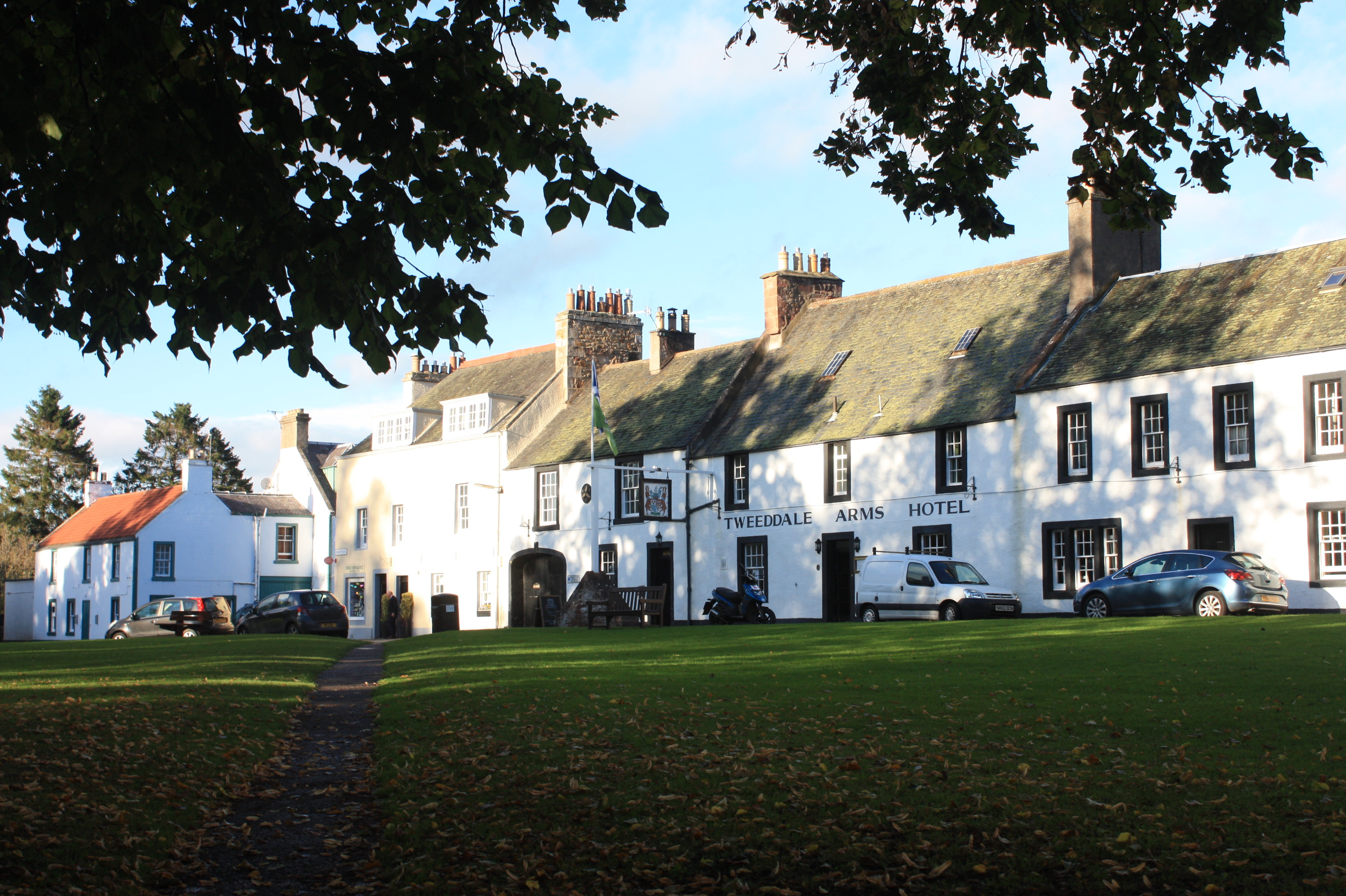
The Tweeddale Arms Hotel, Gifford, East Lothian

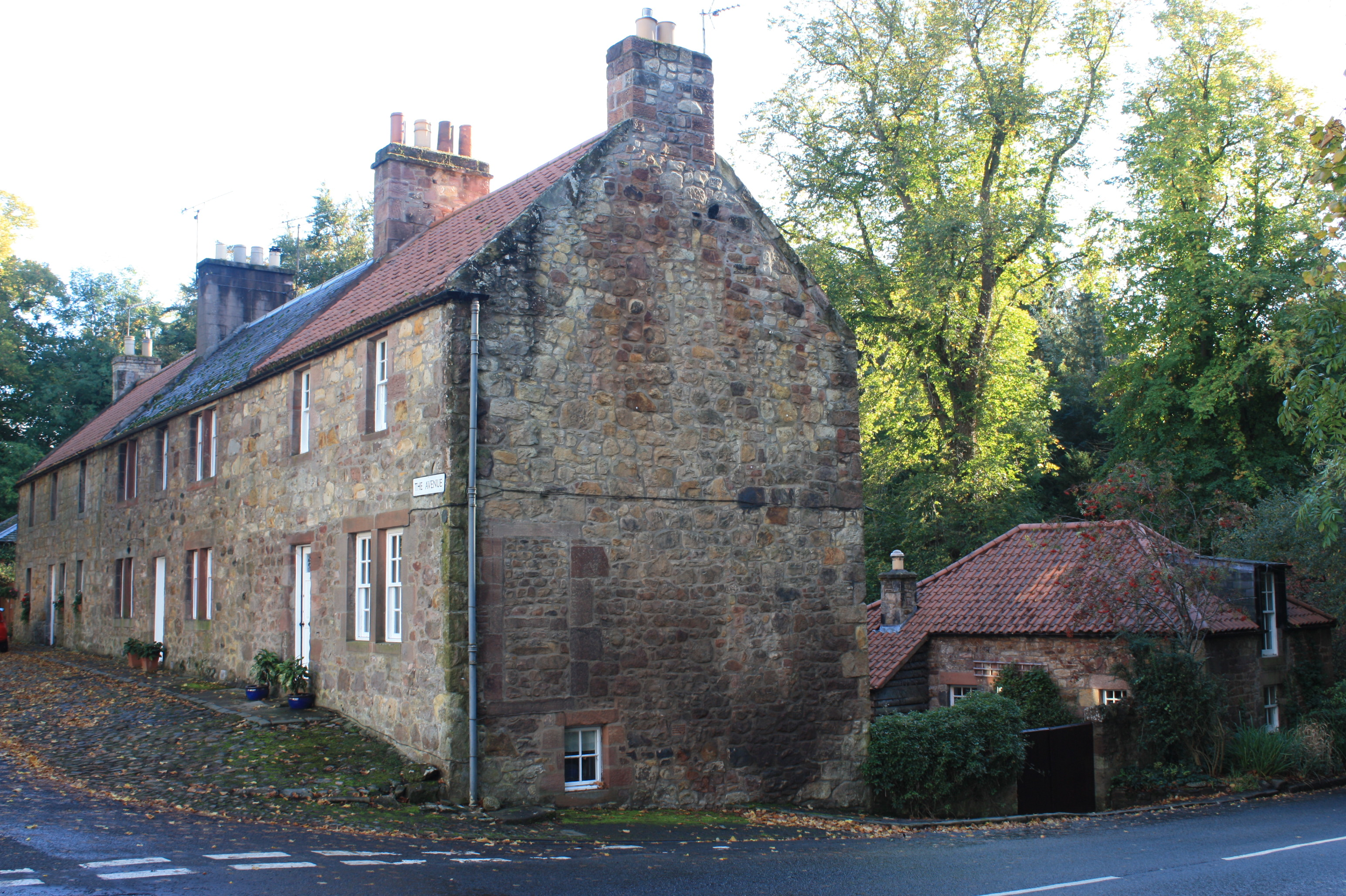
18th century houses on the Avenue, Gifford, East Lothian

The village of Gifford takes its name from the 13th-century Sir Hugo de Giffard of Yester, whose ancient Scoto-Norman family possessed the baronies of Yester, a name that derives from the Cambro-British word Ystrad (modern Welsh: Vale), Morham, and Duncanlaw in Haddingtonshire, and Tayling and Poldame in the counties of Perthshire and Forfar.

The first Hugo de Giffard's grandson, Hugh de Giffard, was a magician who built Yester Castle (1/2 mile or 800 m south-east of the present-day Yester House), the ruins and an underground chamber (the 'Goblin Ha') of which can be seen in Yester Wood. The same Hobgoblin Hall featured in the poem "Marmion" by Walter Scott.

The Mercat Cross was built in 1780 and is still standing in the centre of the village. Gifford Town Hall started life as an early 18th century private house which was later extended and then partially rebuilt.

The ITV television series Adam Smith was filmed in and around Gifford in the early 1970s.

== Former industries ==
The initial chief industry in the town was the paper mill, which was once the source of the Bank of Scotland's bank notes. However, this mill closed in the late 18th century and since then the village has largely been residential and supported local farming communities, although a pottery, known as Castle Wynd Pottery, operated at Gifford for a short time in the 1950s.

== Church ==
The earliest recorded presence of a church in the area is in 1241, the ruins of which lie in the woods beside Yester House, to the south-west of the village centre. This old church is called St. Bathan's Chapel, having been dedicated to Saint Baithin, a 6th century monk from Tír Chonaill (now mainly County Donegal) in the west of Ulster. A church also once stood at Duncanlaw, a former settlement to the south-east of the main village. The present building (in the centre of the village) was built in 1710.

== Infrastructure and amenities ==
Gifford was the terminus on a branch railway which was originally intended to extend to Garvald and was built by the Gifford and Garvald Light Railway Company. The company seal, which features the Mercat Cross, is in the Glasgow Museum of Transport. The line was operated by the North British Railway and then the London and North Eastern Railway. The section of line to Gifford was closed in 1947, following the loss of a bridge washed away by flooding. British Railways operated the line as far as East Saltoun until the Beeching cuts of the 1960s.

The village has a school, church, several shops, two traditional hotels and a garage. A bus service, operated by Prentice Coaches, connects the village to Haddington and Pencaitland.

Like the church, the school takes the name of the parish, as Yester Primary School. The current school building was built in 1968, when East Lothian County Council reorganised schooling arrangements in the area. Yester Primary was expanded to accommodate children from the small schools in Bolton, Morham, Garvald and Longyester, which were all closed between 1968 and 1971. The school roll in recent years has been around 150 pupils, plus up to 40 children in the attached nursery. Secondary education is provided at Knox Academy, in Haddington.

A large park (known as the Bleachfield, from its historic use) lies near the centre of the village, and the East Lothian Core Paths network has been expanded to improve access to the surrounding countryside. The village has two golf courses. Gifford Golf Club is on the western edge of the village, while Castle Park Golf Club is to the south. The Gifford Cup is an annual golf event, which is held in alternate years between the two courses.

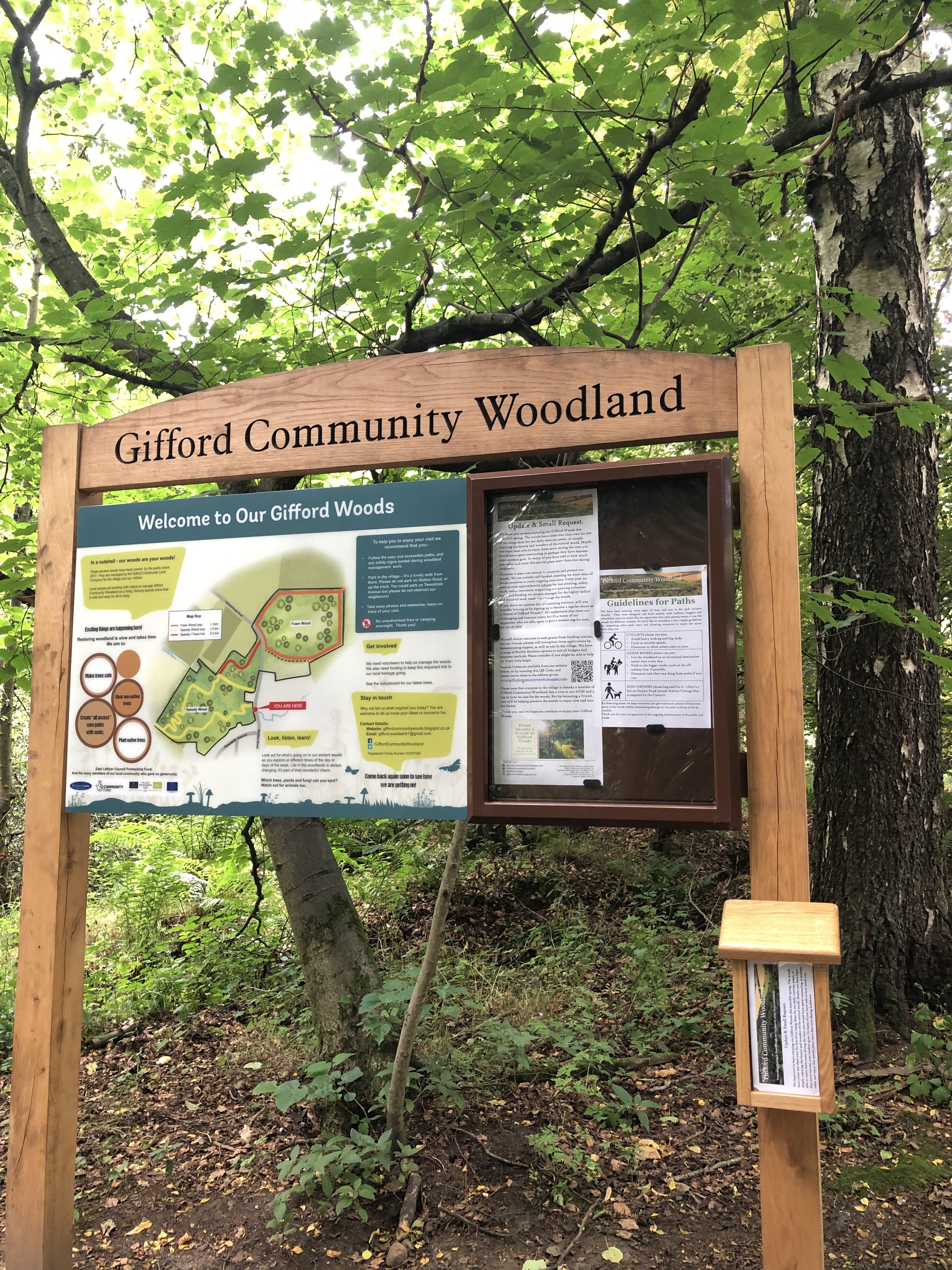
Welcome Sign at the entrance of Gifford Community Woodland

In 2017 the local Gifford community bought 55 acres (22 ha) of woodland, including which comprises Fawn Wood, Speedy Wood, located to the north west of the village with financial support from the Scottish Land Fund. It is now called Gifford Community Woodland, and is managed by the charity Gifford Community Land Company with the vision of a restored native woodland supporting broad biodiversity which is an asset to the local community for leisure, health and learning.

== Notable people ==
- Arthur Hay, 9th Marquess of Tweeddale (1824–1878), soldier and ornithologist, was born at Yester House, near Gifford.
- John Knox, the famous reformer of Scotland, was born in Gifford in 1505.
- William Stewart MacGeorge (1861–1931) artist associated with the Kirkcudbright School.
- Gian Carlo Menotti (1911-2007), composer, and former owner of Yester House.
- Reverend John Witherspoon, was born in Gifford in 1723. He studied at the Haddington Grammar School, gained a Master of Arts from the University of Edinburgh in 1739, and was a Presbyterian minister in Beith, Ayrshire, before accepting an offer from Princeton in New Jersey to be their 6th President. He was the only clergyman to sign the Declaration of Independence of the United States, on 4 July 1776.
- Willie Wood, double Commonwealth Games Bowls gold medallist, is from Gifford. He learned the sport at the Gifford Bowling Club, and as well as a large collection of medals he holds the record of competing in seven Commonwealth Games.

== See also ==
- Yester Parish Church
- List of places in East Lothian
- List of castles in Scotland
