= John Hayes =

John or Johnny Hayes may refer to:

== Arts and entertainment ==
- J. Milton Hayes (1884–1940), English actor and poet
- John F. Hayes (writer) (1904–1980), Canadian writer
- John Michael Hayes (1919–2008), American screenwriter
- John Hayes (director) (1930–2000), American director of low-budget films
- John Hayes (radio), American radio executive
- Johnny Hayes (radio DJ), American radio personality

== Politics ==
=== U.K. ===
- John Hayes (1643–1705), MP for Winchelsea
- Jack Hayes (politician) (John Henry Hayes, 1887–1941), Member of Parliament for Liverpool Edge Hill
- John Hayes (British politician) (born 1958), British politician and MP
- Seán Hayes (Cork politician) (otherwise known as John Hayes, 1884–1928), Sinn Féin member of the 1st Dáil Éireann, and the 2nd and 3rd

=== U.S. ===
- John F. Hayes (Borough President of Brooklyn) (1915–2001), American politician
- John F. Hayes (Kansas legislator) (1919–2010), Kansas attorney and majority leader of the Kansas House of Representatives
- Johnny H. Hayes (1941–2008), Tennessee Democratic politician and fundraiser
- J. P. Hayes (politician), member of the California State Assembly

=== Other politicians ===
- John Hayes (Tasmanian politician) (1868–1956), Australian politician, Premier of Tasmania, 1922–1923
- John Hayes (Queensland politician) (1897–1986), member of the Queensland Legislative Assembly
- John Hayes (New Zealand politician) (born 1948), New Zealand diplomat and politician

== Military ==
- Sir John Hayes, 1st Baronet (c. 1750–1809), military physician
- John Hayes (explorer) (1768–1831), of the British East India Company
- John Hayes (Royal Navy officer, died 1838) (1767/1775–1838), Royal Navy admiral
- John Hayes (sailor) (1832–1911), American Civil War sailor and Medal of Honor recipient
- John Daniel Hayes (1902–1991), U.S. Navy admiral and naval historian
- John Hayes (Royal Navy officer, born 1913) (1913–1998), British admiral
- John B. Hayes (1924–2001), U.S. Coast Guard commandant
- John Alfred Hayes, Union Army surgeon and officer

== Sports ==
=== Australian rules football ===
- John Hayes (footballer, born 1903) (1903–1977), Australian rules footballer for Fitzroy
- John Hayes (footballer, born 1936), Australian rules footballer for St Kilda
- John Hayes (footballer, born 1939), Australian rules footballer, former Fitzroy VFL captain

=== Other sports ===
- John Hayes (baseball) (1855–1904), baseball player
- Johnny Hayes (1886–1965), American marathon runner
- Johnny Hayes (baseball) (1910–1988), American Negro league baseball player
- John Hayes (harness racer) (1919–1998), harness racing driver/trainer/owner
- John Hayes (cricketer) (1927–2007), New Zealand Test cricketer
- John Hayes (rugby league) (1939–2023), Australian rugby league footballer
- John Bouchier-Hayes (born 1944), Irish Olympic fencer
- John Hayes (tennis) (born 1955), American tennis player, who was on the tour in the early 1980s
- John Hayes (soccer) (born 1960), U.S. soccer player
- J. P. Hayes (born 1965), American golfer
- John Hayes (rugby union) (born 1973), Irish prop forward
- John Hayes (Gaelic footballer), Irish Gaelic football player
- John Joe Hayes, Irish hurler

== Others ==
- John Hayes (1685–1726), killed by his wife Catherine Hayes (murderer); tried for the murder and executed by burning at the stake.
- John Hayes (painter) (1786?–1866), British portrait artist
- John E. Hayes, American chemosensory psychophysicist
- John Hayes (unionist) (1854–1942), American labor union leader
- John M. Hayes (priest) (1887–1957), Irish Catholic priest
- John "Chow" Hayes (1911–1993), Australian criminal
- John Hayes (art historian) (1929–2005), British art historian and museum director, expert on Gainsborough
- John M. Hayes (scientist) (1940–2017), scientist emeritus at Woods Hole Oceanographic Institution
- John Hayes, co-founder of software publisher Peachtree Accounting
- John P. Hayes, Irish-American computer scientist and electrical engineer
- John S. Hayes, newspaper executive and American ambassador
- John W. Hayes, British archaeologist

== See also ==
- Jackie Hayes (disambiguation)
- John Hays (disambiguation)
- John Hay (disambiguation)
- Jonny Hayes (born 1987), Irish footballer
- Jonathan Hayes (born 1962), former professional American football tight end
