= Tom Morgan (comics) =

American comic artist

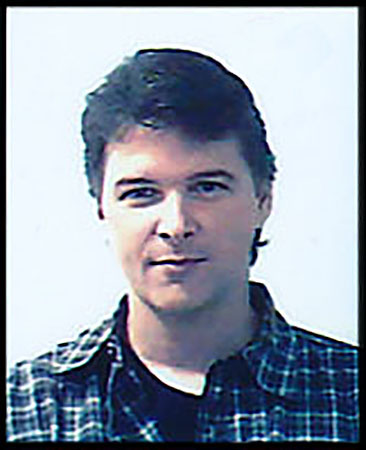
- Born: October 21
- Notable works: Captain America; The Punisher 2099; Iron Man

Tom Morgan (born October 21) is an American comic book artist known primarily for his work on Marvel Comics' Captain America, The Punisher 2099, Excalibur and Iron Man.

== Career ==
Morgan broke into the industry in the early 1980s and worked on a large number of Marvel titles such as Captain America, Iron Man, Alpha Flight, Spider-Man, Star Brand, West Coast Avengers, Star Trek, and Power Pack. He co-created and drew Punisher 2099 and co-created and designed the U.S.Agent costume for his run on Captain America; In the 1990s he drew Extreme Justice and both the Action Comics and The Adventures of Superman titles for DC Comics.

In November 1995, ReganBooks released Miss America, the second book by radio and media personality Howard Stern, which includes a five-page comic book story, written and drawn by Morgan. It was printed as a glossy paper insert, and features Stern's satirical superhero, Fartman. Morgan's story is based on the screenplay by J.F. Lawton for an unproduced Fartman film.

Morgan drew Jeff Mariotte's biography of Barack Obama, which was released in late 2008 by IDW Publishing.

== Bibliography ==
- West Coast Avengers #38, 41, 58, 71, 100 (Marvel, 1988–1993)
- Captain America #330, 332–338, 350 (Marvel, 1987–1988)
- Punisher 2099 #1-11, 13, 15–19, 25, 32-34 (Marvel, 1993–1995)
- Iron Man #289, 298, 300, 307-319 (Marvel, 1993–1995)
- Extreme Justice #12-18 (DC, 1996)

== Notes ==
Preceded by Paul Neary	Captain America artist 1987–1988	Succeeded by Kieron Dwyer
Preceded by N/A	The Punisher 2099 artist 1993–1994	Succeeded by Simon Coleby
Preceded by Kev Hopgood	Iron Man artist 1994–1995	Succeeded by David Chlystek
Preceded by Pasqual Ferry	Extreme Justice artist 1995–1996	Succeeded by N/A
