= Alf Hayes =

Australian rules footballer (1900–1976)

Personal information
- Full name: Michael Alphonsus Hayes
- Born: 29 July 1900; Sebastopol, Victoria
- Died: 22 July 1976 (aged 75); Hamilton, Victoria
- Original team: South Ballarat
- Height: 179 cm (5 ft 10 in)

Playing career^{1}
Years	Club	Games (Goals)
1926	Fitzroy	5 (0)
- ^{1} Playing statistics correct to the end of 1926.

Michael Alphonsus 'Alf' Hayes (29 July 1900 – 22 July 1976) was an Australian rules footballer who played with Fitzroy in the Victorian Football League (VFL).

He was the brother of John Hayes who played a single game with Fitzroy the following season.
