= Fartman (Howard Stern) =

- First appearance: June 1979 in National Lampoon

In-universe information
- Species: Human

Fartman is a fictional superhero, popularized and portrayed by American radio "shock jock" Howard Stern. The character first appeared in an issue of the National Lampoon humor magazine in the late 1970s (Vol. 2, No. 11, June, 1979, Page 28). A recorded version of the character also appeared on National Lampoon's White Album in 1979. Stern began using the character on The Howard Stern Show in the early 1980s. According to the trademark that Howard Stern filed for the character on October 16, 1992, he first used Fartman in July 1981, when Adam West was a guest on his show, to which he made an impromptu Fartman outfit in five minutes, although the original outfit contained a toilet seat necklace which Stern later discontinued from his motif.

Fartman generally attacks evil using his super powered flatulence, which also allows him to fly through the air.

== Feature film ==
In the early 1990s, Stern considered producing a movie based on this successful and well-received character from the show. Stern first revealed his intentions to make a Fartman movie in 1992.

On November 25, 1992, Variety reported that J. F. Lawton, writer of Pretty Woman and Under Siege, was planning to write and direct New Line Cinema's Stern's film project, titled The Adventures of Fartman. The film, which would be budgeted at $8 million-to-$11 million, was expected to go into production the following May in New York. David Permut would produce the film under his Permut Presentations Banner, which has a first-look deal at New Line. According to Lawton, The Adventures of Fartman would revolve around the superhero and his alter ego, a magazine publisher in the mold of Screw magazine's Al Goldstein.

On June 28, 1993, Time magazine reported that Lawton was working on a screenplay for The Adventures of Fartman. Lawton told Time, "There's a lot of nudity, some harsh language, a lesbian love scene, and the main character works for an underground sex magazine. We told New Line Cinema the plot, and they said, 'Yeah, it sounds great. But can't we make it PG-13?'"

The Fartman movie was not put into production. Instead, Stern made a movie out of his bestselling book, Private Parts. Private Parts hit theaters on March 7, 1997, with the opening scene being a reenactment of Stern’s Fartman appearance at the 1992 MTV Video Music Awards.

In 1999, Stern hoped to follow up the success of Private Parts with a movie about the Fartman character.

Early in the year, Howard revealed he was in talks with studios to finally produce Fartman. He said that it would go into production in the summer of 1999, and that there were studios prepared to finance it. In December, Stern stated that the movie was on hold. Though he had a script, and two studios willing to produce it, he was unsure that it was the right time to do it. Stern also didn't want to make a PG-13 version of the film, the way the studios wanted it to be.

In 2002, Stern considered shooting the Fartman movie on video for his fans, but to date no official productions have been greenlit.

Fartman was considered by Vince McMahon to be brought in as a one-time character for WrestleMania, but he and Howard Stern had different views on how to show him. Stern wanted to have his character knock out a wrestler with flatulence, but McMahon wanted Stern to get pummeled by a wrestler.

== Comics ==
In November 1995, ReganBooks released Miss America, the second book by Stern, which includes a five-page comic book story featuring Fartman. It was written and drawn by Tom Morgan, based on Lawton's unproduced screenplay, and printed as a glossy paper insert.

== Short film ==
In April 2006, the Howard Stern Film Festival took place at the Hudson Theatre in New York City, NY. While announcing the competition, Stern encouraged fans to make short films about not only the show and its cast, but popular bits and characters such as Fartman. Many films included Fartman, but while none of those were chosen as finalists, one submission did find a degree of success.

Director Tammy Caplan's Fartman: Caught in a Tight Ass stars Fartman and introduces the evil villain, Tight Ass, who has the ability to squeeze weapons from his ass. It also features a love interest for Fartman, the beautiful Labia Lips. The film was first chosen as a potential finalist in the festival, but later disqualified for using professional actors from the Screen Actors Guild.

Following the festival, Fartman: Caught in a Tight Ass began airing on Howard TV, Howard Stern’s iN Demand Cable Channel as part of their “Best of the Film Festival” series. This is the first live action Fartman movie ever to be shown on television. In 2007, Fartman: Caught in a Tight Ass first appeared on Atom Films.
