= Howard Stern Comes Again =

2019 nonfiction book by Howard Stern

- Author: Howard Stern
- Language: English
- Publisher: Simon & Schuster
- Publication date: May 14, 2019
- Publication place: United States
- Media type: Hardcover; eBook
- Pages: 560 (Hardcover)
- ISBN: 978-1-501-19429-0
- Preceded by: Miss America

Howard Stern Comes Again is the third book by American radio personality Howard Stern, released on May 14, 2019, by Simon & Schuster. It is his first book in 24 years since the release of Miss America (1995).

== Background ==
By early 2017, Stern had been broadcasting his radio show on SiriusXM for eleven years and looked into the idea of writing a third book, following Private Parts (1993) and Miss America (1995). He entered discussions with Simon & Schuster, the publisher of Private Parts, who were keen to release it and assigned editor and publisher Jonathan Karp to collaborate with Stern on the project. At first Stern felt apprehensive about writing a third book because his first two had reached "crazy" levels of success. Karp was determined to make the process easy for Stern, however, and in April 2017, having discussed the idea of printing a selection of celebrity interviews from his radio show, visited Stern's Manhattan apartment and presented him with a mockup book of 30 transcripts that he had chosen, complete with a book jacket. Stern was flattered over the gesture, which convinced him to go ahead with the project. Shortly before the book's release, Stern revealed that a key reason to write a third book was his cancer scare in May 2017, after a growth was found on one of his kidneys which turned out to be a benign cyst.

== Writing ==
By the time Stern started on the book, he had decided to expand its initial concept and write not only commentary on some of his favorite interviews, but autobiographical chapters on his life and career in recent years. He decided against using the interviews that Karp originally chose and set about the task of picking his own, trawling through hundreds of transcripts until he settled on 40 and prepared an introduction for each one. Stern also combined excerpts from interviews on a unifying theme, including sex and relationships and money and fame. During this process, Stern decided to include passages from on-air conversations with Donald Trump throughout the book that date back as early as 1995. Stern had planned to complete the book in one year, but this editing process took time which delayed the project by a further year. Stern had to remind Karp to remain patient for him to deliver and dedicated most of his weekends and vacation time to write it, something that he had done on his previous books and vowed "would never do again." Upon completion, Stern said: "I put my heart and soul into this book and could not be more proud of it." The worldwide publishing rights were acquired by Jonathan Kara and Sean Manning from Stern's agent.

== Announcement ==
Stern formally announced the book on his radio show on March 12, 2019, revealing its title and front cover. Within hours of the announcement, the strength of pre-order sales made the book number one on Amazon's best seller list. A rift developed between Stern and talk show host Wendy Williams, who discussed the book on her show and alleged Stern had lost his edge from his past shock jock days and had become "so Hollywood right now". Stern retaliated on the air the following morning, feeling insulted and told Williams to "keep your opinion to yourself". Two months later, Stern apologized to Williams for his reaction: "If 'Hollywood' means that I've evolved in some way and the show has changed, then yeah, she hit the nail on the head."

== Content ==
In addition to the celebrity interviews and Stern's commentary on them, the book details Stern's departure from terrestrial radio in 2005 and his move to SiriusXM the following year, his life and career since then. The Hollywood Reporter described his introductions to the celebrity interviews as "like a series of love letters to his subjects." Stern revealed the 2015 interview with Conan O'Brien as his favorite of his career.

== Release and reception ==
The book was released on May 14, 2019, in hardcover and electronic formats. Stern embarked on a media tour to promote the book, granting press, radio, and television interviews. On the day of release, the book entered Amazon's best seller list at number one. An excerpt from the book was exclusively published online by Rolling Stone. The book entered The New York Times Best Seller list at No. 1 under the hardcover and combined print and e-book categories.

In a review for Atlanta Journal-Constitution, Melissa Ruggieri thought the book is "a gorgeous compendium" of interviews and praised Stern's interviewing style with a voice "always prominent as a narrator and guide through these engrossing dives into the lives of others." A more critical review from Maureen Callahan appeared in The New York Post who considered it a "drag" to see Stern promote a book that contains "just 17 pages of new, personal material – and if you've seen any of his interviews, you know exactly what's on those pages."
