= Howard Stern =

American radio and television personality (born 1954)

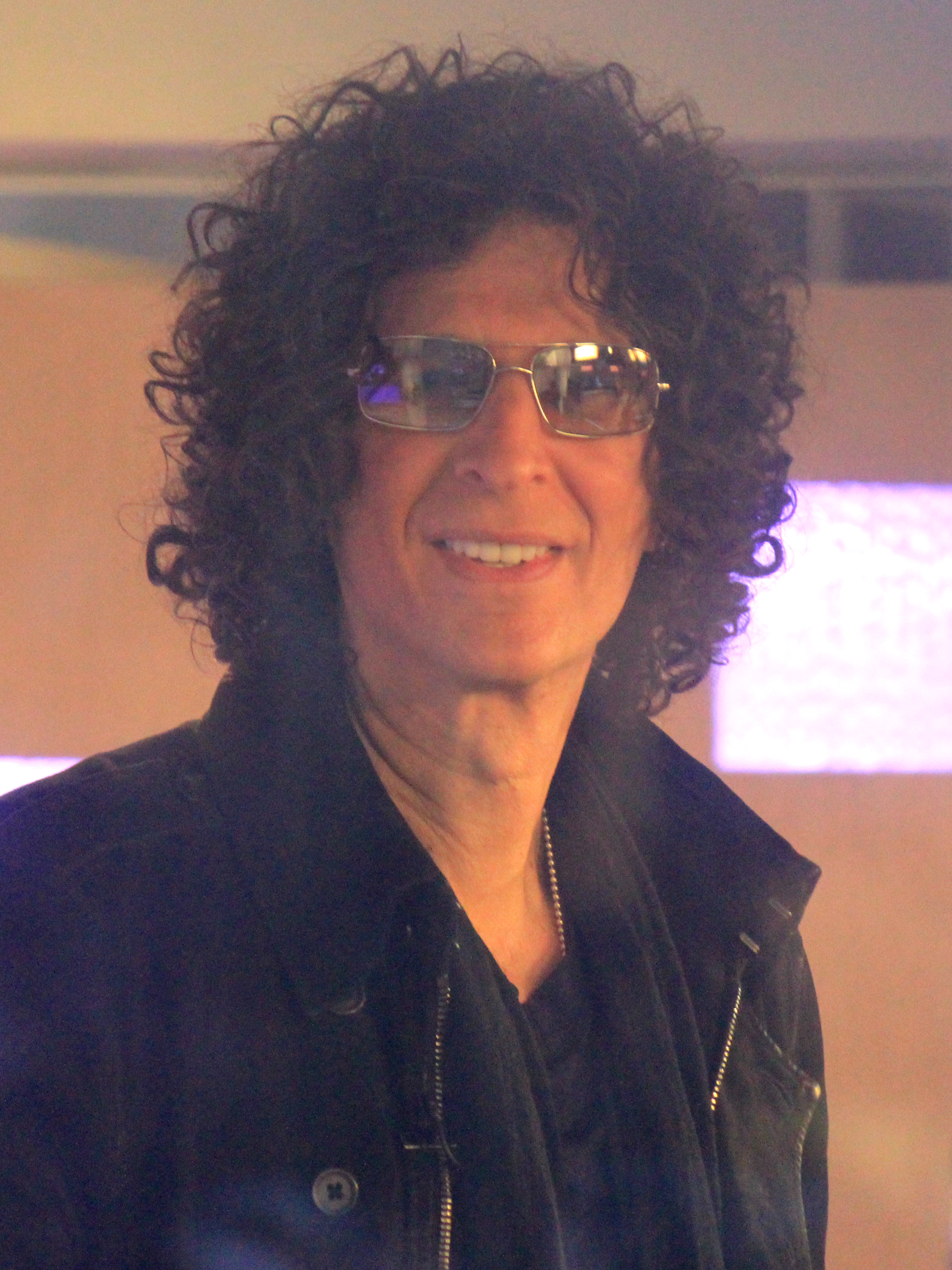
- Stern in 2012
- Born: Howard Allan Stern; January 12, 1954 (age 72); New York City, U.S.
- Education: Boston University (BA)
- Occupations: Broadcaster; comedian; media personality
- Years active: 1975–present
- Political party: Libertarian
- Spouses: Alison Berns (m. 1978; div. 2001) Beth Ostrosky (m. 2008)
- Children: 3
- Website: howardstern.com

Howard Allan Stern (born January 12, 1954) is an American broadcaster, comedian, and media personality. He is best known for The Howard Stern Show, which rose to prominence through national syndication on terrestrial radio from 1986 to 2005; he has broadcast on SiriusXM since 2006.

Stern began his radio career while at Boston University. From 1976 to 1982, he developed his on-air style at WRNW (Briarcliff Manor, NY), WCCC (Hartford, CT), WWWW (Detroit, MI), and WWDC (Washington, D.C.). He later worked afternoons at WNBC in New York City from 1982 until his firing in 1985, before starting a 20-year run at WXRK. His morning show entered syndication in 1986, eventually reaching 60 markets and peaking at 20 million listeners. From 2012 to 2015, he served as a judge on America's Got Talent. In his SiriusXM years, he gained renewed attention for long-form interviews, including The Howard Stern Interview: Bruce Springsteen (2022) and 2024 interviews with Then President Joe Biden and Vice President Kamala Harris.

Stern has received numerous awards, including Billboard's Nationally Syndicated Air Personality of the Year for eight consecutive years, and became the first host to hold the number one morning show in both New York City and Los Angeles. He is also the most fined radio host, with the Federal Communications Commission issuing $2.5 million in fines to station owners over indecent content. In 2004, he signed a five-year, $500 million deal with Sirius, making him one of the highest-paid figures in radio; he renewed his SiriusXM contract for three more years in December 2025.

Calling himself the "King of All Media" since 1992, Stern has worked across television, pay-per-view, and home video. His books Private Parts (1993) and Miss America (1995) both debuted at number one on The New York Times Best Seller list and sold over one million copies. Private Parts was adapted into a 1997 biographical comedy film starring Stern and his radio team, topping the U.S. box office in its opening week and grossing $41.2 million domestically. Its soundtrack reached number one on the Billboard 200 and was certified platinum. His third book, Howard Stern Comes Again, was released in 2019.

== Early life and education ==
Howard Allan Stern was born on January 12, 1954, in the Jackson Heights neighborhood of Queens, New York City, the second child of Ben (1923–2022) and Ray (née Schiffman) Stern (b. 1927). His parents are Jewish, with family roots in Poland and Austria-Hungary. Ray worked as an office clerk in New York City before becoming a homemaker and later an inhalation therapist. Ben served in the U.S. Army on Long Island and in California during the war, and later worked as a radio engineer at WHOM in Manhattan and as co-owner and operator of Aura Recording Inc., a Manhattan studio where cartoons and commercials were produced. Stern described his older sister Ellen as the "complete opposite" of himself and "very quiet."

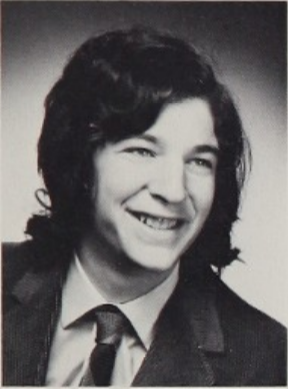
Howard Stern as a high school senior in 1972

In 1955, the family moved to Roosevelt, New York, on Long Island, where Stern attended Washington-Rose Elementary School followed by Roosevelt Junior-Senior High School. He also attended Hebrew school, where he was given the name Tzvi. As a child, Stern took five years of piano lessons and developed an interest in marionettes, entertaining friends with explicit shows. He later formed a band with two school friends, Electric Comicbook, performing vocals and keyboards. From age nine through his second year of university, Stern spent his summers at Camp Wel-Met, a youth camp in Narrowsburg, New York, where he worked as a camper, in the kitchen, and as a counselor; he later described it as "the greatest experience."

When I saw my father as a recording engineer ... I was enamored. Looking at how my father was so reverential to those people, I thought that maybe he could look at me with that kind of respect if I could get behind a microphone.

— Stern on his father's influence

Stern developed an interest in radio at age five, citing talk personalities Bob Grant and Brad Crandall as early influences. Though not a frequent listener, he used a home setup—microphone, tape machine, and turntable—provided by his father to record mock radio shows with characters, prank calls, and commercials. Visits to his father's recording studio, where he observed performers like Don Adams and Larry Storch, the voices of voice Tennessee Tuxedo and His Tales, inspired him to pursue being on-air rather than simply playing music.

In the late 1960s, Roosevelt became a predominantly Black area; Stern recalled that only "a handful of white kids" remained at his school and described repeated instances of extreme bullying from Black students. In June 1969, the family moved to nearby Rockville Centre, where Stern, then fifteen, transferred to South Side High School and became "a total introvert" He graduated in 1972; his yearbook lists his only student activity as membership in the Key Club.

In 1972, Stern declined a place at Elmira College to pursue a communications degree at Boston University, but his average high school grades led him to spend his first two years in its College of Basic Studies. In his second year, he began working at the campus radio station WTBU, where he played records, read the news, and hosted interview programs. With three fellow students, he later co-hosted a weekly comedy show, The King Schmaltz Bagel Hour, which was canceled during its first broadcast due to a racial sketch titled "Godzilla Goes to Harlem." During this time, Stern used cannabis, Quaaludes, and LSD, but quit after a difficult experience with LSD.

In 1974, he gained admission to the university's School of Public Communications. He then studied for a diploma at the Radio Engineering Institute of Electronics in Fredericksburg, Virginia, in July 1975, which earned him a first-class radio-telephone operator license, a required certificate for all radio broadcasters at the time, which was issued by the Federal Communications Commission. With the license, Stern landed his first professional radio job at WNTN in Newton, Massachusetts from August to December 1975 doing air shifts, newscasting, and production work. For the next five months, he taught students basic electronics in preparation for their own FCC exams.

In May 1976, Stern graduated magna cum laude with a 3.8-grade point average. His major was broadcasting and film, and his minor was English and speech. He funded a scholarship at the university.

== Career ==
=== 1976–1981: WRNW, WCCC, and WWWW ===
After graduating, Stern began his search for radio work by taking an evening position at WRNW, a progressive rock station in Briarcliff Manor, New York. Despite early doubts about his talent, he briefly left for jobs in advertising—first at Benton & Bowles, then in a creative role he lost after just three hours, before working unsuccessfully as a radio ad salesman in Queens. Realizing he had turned down a radio opportunity, he returned to WRNW, taking temporary holiday shifts in 1976 with encouragement from his mother and girlfriend. Impressed by his reliability, the station's director hired him full-time for a six-day, four-hour midday shift at $96 per week. Within months, Stern became production director, and by November 1977, he was promoted to program director with a salary of $250 per week. During this period, he lived frugally, renting a room in a monastery in Armonk, New York.

In 1979, Stern responded to a Radio & Records advertisement seeking a "wild, fun morning guy" at WCCC in Hartford, Connecticut. He created an aircheck featuring more outrageous material, blending comedy records with added sound effects and one-liners, to showcase his style, and was hired at the same salary but with a far more demanding schedule. After four hours on air, he spent another four producing and voicing commercials, along with additional production work on Saturdays and duties as public affairs director. He also hosted a Sunday morning talk show, which he preferred as it better reflected the kind of radio he wanted to create.

During the 1979 energy crisis, Stern gained media attention by urging listeners to boycott the Shell Oil Company for two days. At WCCC, he met Fred Norris, then an overnight DJ, who became his longtime writer and producer starting in 1981. Stern left the station in early 1980 after being denied a $25-per-week raise. Around the same time, rival station WHCN sent recordings and press coverage of Stern to the consulting firm Burkhart/Abrams in an effort to push him out of the Hartford market as his ratings grew. Consultant Dwight Douglas subsequently offered Stern a position in Columbus, Ohio, which he declined.

In his search for new work, Stern responded to a Radio & Records listing for a morning host at WWWW, a struggling rock station in Detroit, Michigan. Despite advice from Douglas to wait for a better opportunity, Stern accepted the offer and began on April 21, 1980. Determined to evolve his style, he aimed to be more open and authentic on air, stripping away ego and barriers.

His approach led to early industry recognition, including a Billboard Award for Album-Oriented Rock Personality of the Year (Major Market) and a win in Drake-Chenault's Top Five Talent Search, with his segments distributed nationwide. Despite his personal success, the station's ratings continued to decline. In January 1981, after poor Arbitron results, WWWW abruptly switched from rock to country music, prompting Stern to leave two weeks later, unwilling to adapt to the new format. He declined offers from WXRT in Chicago and CHUM in Toronto, Ontario, Canada.

=== 1981–1985: WWDC and WNBC ===
Stern's next job came when Douglas helped him land a morning hosting position at album-oriented rock station WWDC in Washington. Initially cautious, later noting that the general manager "was not really aware of what I did," Stern accepted the offer and began on March 2, 1981. While relocating from Detroit, Stern spent several weeks developing a new format, viewing the role as a key step toward his ultimate goal of working in New York City. Determined to stand out, he later recalled, "I was going to kill my competition. I was going to say whatever the fuck I was going to say … The first step was to put my team together." As part of that effort, he sought a co-host who could banter with him on news and current events.

The station paired Stern with Robin Quivers, a former Air Force nurse and news reporter at WFBR. After hearing a tape of Stern interviewing a prostitute on air, Quivers accepted the role without meeting him, expecting a traditional news position "but it wasn't that way."

Management frequently clashed with Stern over content, eventually installing a seven-second delay to censor potentially objectionable material. Despite this, Stern continued pushing against what he viewed as outdated restrictions, later saying, "we began to assemble the program I had envisioned." This included bringing Norris as a writer and producer. During this period, Stern also drew attention for controversial on-air moments, including revealing his wife's miscarriage. By January 1982, Stern had built the second highest-rated morning show in the city.

Impressed by Stern's rapid rise in the ratings, WWDC management offered him a one-year contract extension; however, Stern sought a longer-term deal. Around the same time, he received a five-year, $1 million offer to host afternoon programming at WNBC in New York City. The opportunity arose after radio manager Jerry Nachman became a fan of Stern and recommended him to the station. Stern signed with WNBC in March 1982, four months before his WWDC contract was set to expire.

Following his signing, Stern's relationship with WWDC management deteriorated. He frequently criticized station leadership and fellow disc jockeys on air, including one incident in which he disclosed the manager's salary. Tensions culminated in his termination on June 25, 1982. Despite the conflict, Stern had more than tripled his ratings during his tenure, and The Washingtonian named him the city's best disc jockey.

It was widely believed that Stern's firing stemmed from a controversial segment about the Air Florida Flight 90 crash, in which he was rumored to have called the airline asking for fares to the crash site at the 14th Street Bridge and whether it would be a "regular stop." Stern later denied the claim, stating that "no one ever complained about it."

In his final months at WWDC, Stern also secured a $35,000 advance from Wren Records to produce a comedy album of song parodies with Fred Norris, titled 50 Ways to Rank Your Mother, which was later reissued in 1994 as Unclean Beaver.

I was finally getting my shot at working in New York. I was going to work for the world-famous, first-class National Broadcasting Company. This was my dream come true, I thought. Little did I realize it was more like "Welcome to My Worst Nightmare".

— Stern on his move to WNBC in 1982

In April 1982, four months before Howard Stern joined WNBC, NBC Magazine aired a critical report on shock radio by Douglas Kiker that focused on Stern's controversial style. The segment prompted NBC executives to consider buying out his contract, but they instead chose to impose tighter control over his content. The station initially refused to allow Stern to bring his show partners, creating friction between Stern and Quivers for several months.

Stern began his afternoon show on August 30, 1982, under close supervision and with instructions to avoid sexual or religious topics. Within his first month, he was suspended over "Virgin Mary Kong," a sketch involving a video game parody set in Jerusalem. The station then implemented a seven-second delay to censor potentially offensive material, a role handled by program director Kevin Metheny, with whom Stern had a well-known feud, nicknaming him "Pig Virus." During his time at WNBC, Stern also began a longstanding feud with morning host Don Imus.

In 1984, Howard Stern signed with agent Don Buchwald, who later negotiated a new three-year contract for Stern with WNBC in early 1985. Stern's popularity continued to grow despite ongoing restrictions from station management. On May 21, 1984, he made his first appearance on Late Night with David Letterman and was featured in People, both of which increased his national exposure.

Around this time, Stern also appeared in the low-budget comedy film Ryder, P.I. (1986), playing Ben Wah, an erratic newscaster, for which he was paid $1,000. By May 1985, he had achieved the highest ratings at WNBC in four years, earning a 5.7% share of the afternoon audience.

Despite this success, Stern and Quivers were abruptly fired on September 30, 1985, shortly before going on air. Station management cited "conceptual differences" regarding the direction of the program. Program director John Hayes stated that efforts had been made over time to encourage changes to certain elements of the show but declined to specify further. Stern was not informed who made the final decision. In 1992, he speculated that Thornton Bradshaw, then chairman of WNBC's parent company RCA, had heard his controversial "Bestiality Dial-a-Date" segment, aired ten days prior to his suspension, and ordered the show's cancellation.

=== 1985–1993: WXRK, early television and video projects ===
After his dismissal from WNBC, Stern maintained his connection with listeners by performing live stage shows at clubs. He declined several offers to relocate to Los Angeles, including a $50,000 proposal from NBC, instead choosing to remain in New York City, stating his intent to "kick NBC's ass".

At a press conference in October 1985, Stern announced he had signed a five-year contract with Infinity Broadcasting, reportedly worth $500,000, to host afternoon programming on its rock station WXRK beginning November 18. WNBC agreed to release him from the remainder of his contract, avoiding the obligation to continue paying his salary.

Seeking to compete directly with Imus and WNBC, Stern transitioned to the prime morning time slot in February 1986. The program entered syndication on August 18, 1986, when WYSP began simulcasting the show. In the New York market, Stern hosted the highest-rated morning radio program from 1994 through 2001. Over his two-decade tenure at WXRK, Stern's show expanded to 60 markets across North America and reached a peak audience of approximately 20 million listeners.

Stern's first venture into television began when the Fox network sought a replacement for The Late Show, a late-night talk show hosted by Joan Rivers. Following discussions that began in late 1986, Stern agreed to five one-hour pilots that were produced for an estimated $400,000, with guitarist Leslie West as his band leader and comedian Steve Rossi as the show's announcer. The pilots were tested with focus groups in California, but Fox ultimately declined to move forward with the series. One network executive later described the episodes as "poorly produced," "in poor taste," and "boring."

Stern expanded into live events with his first pay-per-view special, Howard Stern's Negligeé and Underpants Party, in February 1988. The broadcast was purchased in approximately 60,000 homes and generated $1.2 million in revenue. Following the event, Stern's on-air joke about drug use backstage drew criticism from Drug Enforcement Administration spokesperson Michael Levine, who raised concerns to the Daily News, prompting media attention but no formal investigation.

In October 1989, Stern's audience again demonstrated strong demand when tickets for Howard Stern's U.S. Open Sores sold out Nassau Coliseum in four hours. The live event featured a tennis match between Stern and his producer Gary Dell'Abate, stemming from an on-air challenge. Stern later released both events on home video.

In its 1990 feature on Stern, Rolling Stone predicted he was "on the fast track to multimedia stardom". He re-signed with Infinity Broadcasting that year to continue his radio show for five years, a deal that New York Magazine estimated was worth over $10 million.

In July 1990, Stern became the host of the Saturday night variety television show The Howard Stern Show on WWOR-TV, featuring himself and his radio show staff. Initially produced as four one-hour summer specials, the program proved successful enough to continue airing and entered syndication in 1991, eventually reaching a peak of 65 markets nationwide, including cities where Stern's radio show was not broadcast. In the New York City market, the show frequently outperformed Saturday Night Live in the ratings during the half-hour period when the two programs overlapped. Stern concluded the series in 1992 after 69 episodes.

By this time, the radio show had been the subject of several fines issued by the Federal Communications Commission (FCC) over material it deemed indecent. As part of his rally against the FCC's actions, Stern released a compilation album of censored radio segments titled Crucified by the FCC in early 1991.

Stern's rise in radio and television in 1992 led to his first use of the self-proclaimed title "King of All Media," initially as a tongue-in-cheek jab at Michael Jackson, known as the "King of Pop." In October 1992, Stern became the first to host the number one morning radio show in both the New York and Los Angeles markets simultaneously.

That same month, he released Butt Bongo Fiesta, a home video featuring "butt bongoing," which he described as rhythmic spanking set to music; it proved a commercial success, selling about 260,000 copies and grossing over $10 million. In November 1992, Stern returned to Saturday night television with The Howard Stern "Interview", a weekly celebrity interview series on the E! network that ended in 1993.

Stern also appeared at the 1992 MTV Video Music Awards as Fartman, a fictional superhero originating from National Lampoon. While presenting with Luke Perry, he took the stage in costume with his buttocks exposed. According to a trademark filing from October 1992, Stern first used the character while at WWDC in July 1981.

Development began in late 1992 on The Adventures of Fartman, a feature film based on the character, with a verbal agreement in place with New Line Cinema. Screenwriter J. F. Lawton was hired to draft the script and direct, alongside producer David Permut, with a projected budget of $8–11 million. Lawton described the film as "a real comedy with a beginning, middle and an end with a strong story." The project was ultimately abandoned in 1993 due to disagreements over content, rating, and merchandising rights.

In November 1993, Stern entered talks with Fox to host a late-night talk show, this time as a potential replacement for Chevy Chase, whose show had been canceled the previous month

=== 1993–1994: Private Parts ===
After The Adventures of Fartman was shelved, Stern's agent Don Buchwald began pitching book deals to reinforce Stern's commercial appeal and generate income. In early 1993, Stern signed a roughly $1 million deal with Simon & Schuster to write his first book, Private Parts. He spent the summer working on it with collaborator Larry "Ratso" Sloman and editor Judith Regan, later calling it the most challenging project of his career.

Released on October 7, 1993, Private Parts was an immediate commercial success. Its initial print run of 225,000 copies sold out within hours, and within five days it became the fastest-selling title in Simon & Schuster's history. More than one million copies were distributed within two weeks. The book debuted at number one on The New York Times Best-Seller list and remained there for 20 weeks. Stern promoted it with nationwide signings, including a New York City event that drew an estimated 10,000 attendees, with some sessions lasting up to seven hours.

Suddenly, I was a mainstream performer who had real clout in the marketplace—I was bankable. Immediately they would forget about my most controversial material and the fact that I could be real dangerous as a broadcaster.

— Stern on the impact of his 1993 book Private Parts

In its twentieth anniversary issue in 1993, Radio & Records named Stern "the most influential air personality of the past two decades." In February 1994, he was featured on the cover of Rolling Stone for the first of three appearances. That same year, Billboard introduced the Nationally Syndicated Air Personality of the Year category to its annual awards, based on entertainment value, creativity, and ratings success; Stern won the award every year from 1994 through 2002.

In late 1993, Stern urged his listeners to support Christine Todd Whitman in the New Jersey gubernatorial election, after promising to endorse the first candidate who called into his show. Following her victory, Whitman named a highway rest stop along Interstate 295 south of Trenton after Stern in March 1995 in recognition of his support. A $1,000 plaque installed at the site was stolen days later and mailed to Stern. The rest area later closed in 2003 amid budget cuts under Governor Jim McGreevey.

Stern held his second pay-per-view special, The Miss Howard Stern New Year's Eve Pageant, on December 31, 1993. Framed as a parody beauty pageant featuring celebrity judges, the broadcast crowned the first "Miss Howard Stern." The event was purchased by an estimated 400,000 households and generated approximately $16 million in revenue, setting a record for a non-sports pay-per-view event previously held by a 1990 New Kids on the Block concert. The program drew significant criticism, with the New York Post describing it as "the most disgusting two hours in the history of television." The controversy surrounding the broadcast also derailed Stern's prospects for a second television deal with Fox, whose executives ended discussions after objecting to the show's content.

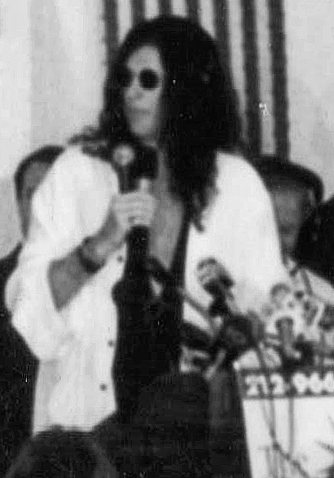
Stern at the Libertarian Party convention during his candidacy for Governor of New York

In June 1994, Stern founded the Howard Stern Production Company to develop original film and television projects, as well as pursue joint production ventures. Among its early efforts was a planned feature film adaptation of Brother Sam, a biography of comedian Sam Kinison written by his brother. That same month, the E! network began airing weekday highlights of Stern's radio show, filmed using in-studio cameras. Howard Stern ran for eleven years, with its final original episode airing on July 8, 2005.

=== 1995–1997: Miss America and Private Parts film ===
On April 3, 1995, three days after the murder of singer Selena, Howard Stern sparked controversy following on-air remarks about her death and Mexican Americans. While criticizing her music, Stern played gunfire sound effects and stated, "This music does absolutely nothing for me. Alvin and the Chipmunks have more soul … Spanish people have the worst taste in music. They have no depth." After three days of sustained criticism, Stern issued a response in Spanish, stating that his remarks were satirical and not intended to offend those who admired Selena. The following day, Justice of the Peace Eloy Cano of Harlingen issued an arrest warrant charging Stern with disorderly conduct, carrying a potential fine of up to $500 should he enter the state. Stern was never arrested on the warrant.

Stern was signed at WVGO in Richmond, Virginia in October 1995; his show's offensive material caused the Ukrop family, the owners of a local grocery chain, to call for an advertising boycott of the station. Due to the success of the boycott and the lower-than-expected ratings received by the show, it was sold and then shut down.

In 1995, Stern signed an advance deal with ReganBooks worth approximately $3 million to write his second book, Miss America. The book covered a range of topics, including his experiences with cybersex on the Prodigy internet service, a private meeting with Michael Jackson, his struggles with back pain and obsessive–compulsive disorder, and his campaign for Governor of New York.

Upon its release on November 7, 1995, Miss America sold 33,000 copies at Barnes & Noble in a single day, setting a company record, and 120,000 copies in its first week. It debuted at number one on The New York Times Best Seller list and remained there for 16 weeks. According to Publishers Weekly, the book sold 1.39 million copies in 1995 alone, making it the third best-selling book of the year. As with his earlier work Private Parts, Stern's book signings drew large crowds.

Stern's November 30, 1995 appearance on The Tonight Show with Jay Leno generated additional controversy after he appeared with two bikini-clad women who kissed each other and were spanked on air. Host Jay Leno had requested that the segment be edited out of the final broadcast and walked off the stage afterward without thanking Stern.

In February 1996, production began on a biographical comedy film adaptation of Private Parts for Paramount Pictures. Development had taken over two years, as Howard Stern—who held final script approval—rejected multiple versions he found overly broad and unappealing. After producer Ivan Reitman joined the project, Stern approved a script by Len Blum and Michael Kalesniko.

Filming began in May 1996 under director Betty Thomas and lasted four months, with Stern, Quivers, and Norris portraying themselves at different stages of their lives. The production schedule was demanding, with the cast traveling to the set after daily radio shows and filming on weekends.

To promote the film, Stern undertook an extensive publicity tour aimed at reaching audiences beyond his radio listeners. Private Parts premiered on February 27, 1997, at The Theater at Madison Square Garden, where Stern and Rob Zombie performed "The Great American Nightmare" for the soundtrack The film opened wide on March 7, 1997, topping the U.S. box office in its first weekend with $14.6 million and ultimately grossing $41.2 million domestically. In 1998, Stern received a Blockbuster Entertainment Award for Favorite Male Newcomer.

The soundtrack, Private Parts: The Album, debuted at number one on the Billboard 200 in March 1997 after selling 178,000 copies in its first week—the highest-selling debut for a film soundtrack at the time. It was certified platinum by the Recording Industry Association of America within three months for shipments of one million copies. Stern also provided vocals on "Tortured Man," recorded with The Dust Brothers.

In October 1997, Stern filed a $1.5 million lawsuit against Ministry of Film Inc., alleging the studio recruited him for the film Jane, starring Melanie Griffith, despite lacking sufficient funding. After production halted and Stern remained unpaid, he accused the studio of breach of contract, fraud, and negligent representation. A settlement was reached in 1999, with Stern receiving $50,000.

=== 1998–2004: Television and film projects ===
In April 1998, Howard Stern announced his return to Saturday night television after signing a deal with CBS to compete with Saturday Night Live on NBC and MADtv on Fox. His show, The Howard Stern Radio Show, was an hour-long program airing on many CBS affiliates, featuring taped highlights from his radio show along with additional material from his nightly E! program, including animated segments and exclusive behind-the-scenes footage

After debuting on August 22, 1998, across 79 stations nationwide, the show quickly began losing affiliates as local broadcasters raised concerns about its risqué content. By June 1999, the number of stations had dropped to fifty-five, and after three seasons, the final episode aired on November 17, 2001, on roughly thirty stations. Stern later reflected that the project was a mistake, noting that his existing E! show already covered similar content and that CBS had hoped to replicate the success of his earlier Channel 9 show.

This executive-producing thing is fun stuff, and unlike my radio career, has been a remarkably smooth experience. I'm very much into this. It's absolutely joyous to be behind the scenes as a responsible businessman.

— Stern on his executive productions

In March 1999, Forbes ranked Howard Stern at number 27 on its inaugural Celebrity 100 list, estimating his annual earnings at $20 million. During the run of his CBS television show, Stern expanded into executive production through his production company, developing several television and film projects.

In September 1999, the UPN network announced Doomsday, an animated science-fiction comedy series initially ordered for thirteen episodes and slated for a 2000 release. Set in a post-apocalyptic America devastated by a radiation burst, it followed the Bradley family traveling cross-country in an RV in search of a new home. Stern was attached as a producer and the voice of the family's dog, Orinthal, but the series never aired. Stern's most successful executive production was Son of the Beach, a parody sitcom of Baywatch that aired on FX from March 2000 to October 2002. The series was not renewed for a fourth season.

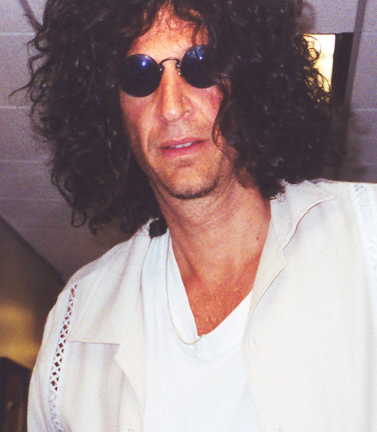
Stern in 2000

On December 16, 2000, Stern announced during his final live radio show of the year that he had signed a new five-year contract with Infinity Broadcasting following four months of negotiations Forbes estimated his annual earnings from the deal at between $17 million and $20 million. In October 2001, he appeared at The Concert for New York City wearing a hazmat suit with his buttocks exposed, echoing his 1992 MTV Music Video Awards appearance.

In November 2001, Stern's production company began developing a weekly sitcom titled Kane for CBS, intended as a potential replacement for The Howard Stern Radio Show, with Ron Zimmerman writing the pilot. The show centered on "an oddball southern family and its strong-willed patriarch," whose life changes when his long-lost wife returns with their eccentric children. The project was canceled before filming began.

In late 2002, Stern acquired the rights to the films Rock 'n' Roll High School (1979) and Porky's (1982) with Arclight Films, aiming to use a remake of the former to launch an unknown band. As part of the deal, he served as executive producer and could brand projects as "Howard Stern Presents," which he said signaled something unconventional to his audience Development of Porky's ultimately stalled in 2011 due to legal disputes over the film's rights.

In March 2003, Stern filed a $100 million lawsuit against ABC, Telepictures, and the producers of the reality series Are You Hot?, alleging its premise was copied from his radio segment The Evaluators, in which staff and guests judged contestants' bodies. Prior to the show's debut, Stern had been in talks to produce his own version; the case was settled five months later.

In early 2004, Stern discussed potential plans with ABC to host an hour-long interview special for its Primetime series, but the project did not move forward. In August 2004, Spike ordered thirteen episodes of Howard Stern: The High School Years, an animated series based on his childhood, with Stern as executive producer By late 2005, scripts and test animation had been completed, but the project was ultimately shelved due to high production costs, which Stern said exceeded $1 million per episode for the desired quality. Actor Michael Cera had been cast in the lead voice role. Stern also developed a pilot with comedian Robert Schimmel for The WB, based on Schimmel's real-life experience of falling in love with his daughter's friend after battling cancer, though it was not picked up.

=== 2004–2010: Signing with Sirius and terrestrial radio departure ===
The controversy surrounding the Super Bowl XXXVIII halftime show, broadcast live on February 1, 2004, led to a surge in audience complaints and a broader government crackdown on indecency in radio and television. In response, station managers imposed stricter content controls, which Stern later said made him feel "dead" creatively.

Following fines issued to Clear Channel Communications and Viacom for material deemed indecent by the FCC, Stern announced on October 6, 2004 that he had signed a five-year deal with Sirius Satellite Radio, starting in 2006. The subscription-based satellite radio service, which was not subject to FCC broadcast regulations, offered greater creative freedom and marked what many viewed as the beginning of "a new era of radio." Stern's final live show on terrestrial radio aired on December 16, 2005.

Stern's first Sirius contract was worth $500 million, including an annual $100 million budget for production and programming. In 2005, he launched Howard 100 and Howard 101, along with Howard 100 News. He ended his association with E! and partnered with iN DEMAND to launch Howard Stern On Demand, later relaunched as HowardTV (2006–2013). A new studio was built for the show at Sirius's New York headquarters.

On January 9, 2006, his first day on Sirius, Stern and Buchwald received 34.3 million shares of Sirius stock worth $218 million for exceeding subscriber targets, followed by an additional 22 million shares worth $82.9 million in 2007. In 2006, Stern was named to Time's Time 100 and ranked seventh on Forbes's Celebrity 100 list. That same year, he filed a trademark for "King of All Media." After Sirius merged with XM in 2008 to form SiriusXM, Stern received a $25 million bonus under his contract

On February 28, 2006, CBS Radio (formerly Infinity Broadcasting) filed a lawsuit against Stern, Buchwald, and Sirius Satellite Radio, alleging that Stern had improperly used CBS broadcast time to promote Sirius during his final fourteen months on terrestrial radio, resulting in unjust enrichment.

Hours before the filing, Stern held a press conference in which he characterized the lawsuit as a "personal vendetta" by CBS president Leslie Moonves, and as a distraction from the company's declining radio performance following his departure. The case was filed in the New York Supreme Court and assigned to Judge Ira Gammerman.

The dispute was resolved out of court in May 2006, with Sirius agreeing to pay CBS $2 million for the rights to Stern's radio archives dating back to 1985, which CBS had previously restricted from airing on Sirius.

=== 2010–2018: Sirius contract renewals and America's Got Talent ===
In December 2010, Stern renewed his SiriusXM contract for five years, reducing his schedule from four to three live shows per week. On March 22, 2011, Stern and Buchwald sued SiriusXM for $300 million over unpaid subscriber-based bonuses, but the case was dismissed with prejudice by Judge Barbara Kapnick on April 17, 2012; their subsequent appeal was also rejected.

By mid-2011, Stern had reduced his time playing chess and turned to photography, shooting layouts for Hamptons Magazine and later contributing to WHIRL Magazine and the North Shore Animal League America. During this period, Stern also established his photography business, Conlon Road Photography, named after the street he lived on while growing up in Roosevelt, New York.

In 2011, Stern returned to network television as a judge on America's Got Talent, joining the show for its seventh season as a replacement for Piers Morgan. To accommodate Stern's radio schedule, production was relocated to Radio City Music Hall in New York City. Following his return to television, Stern reappeared on the Forbes Celebrity 100 list, ranking No. 26. He remained a judge on the program through its eighth, ninth and tenth seasons. Stern departed the show at the conclusion of its tenth season in September 2015 to focus more fully on his radio career.

Despite being openly critical of the organization, Stern was inducted into the National Radio Hall of Fame in 2012.

In August 2013, Stern and Simon Cowell shared first place on Forbes' list of America's highest-paid television personalities with $95 million earned between June 2012–13. Stern and Cowell tied first place in the following year's poll with the same amount earned from June 2013–14. In 2015, Forbes placed Stern as the world's highest paid media personality and the fifth highest earning celebrity worldwide, at $95 million.

On September 16, 2013, Stern and In Demand announced that the Howard TV contract would not be renewed, and the service would end in December. In February 2015, Whalerock Industries announced its partnership with Stern to set up a future direct-to-consumer digital "media hub" service tentatively called “Howard 360”, which was planned as a video streaming service with a potential mix of free and subscription-based programming, though it was never realized.

On December 15, Stern announced his new deal with SiriusXM to continue his radio show for an additional five years. The agreement also gives Sirius the rights to his radio and video archives for an upcoming on-demand streaming application until 2027, which eventually evolved into the SiriusXM app.

In April 2018, Stern inducted Bon Jovi into the Rock and Roll Hall of Fame.

=== 2019–2025: Howard Stern Comes Again and additional Sirius contract renewals ===
In March 2019, Stern announced his third book for Simon & Schuster entitled Howard Stern Comes Again, which was released on May 14, 2019. In interviews surrounding the book, Stern said psychotherapy and a 2017 kidney-cyst health scare shifted both his personal life and interviewing style, leading him toward more intimate, collaborative conversations rather than treating guests as foils.

In December 2020, Stern renewed his contract with SiriusXM, agreeing to produce his show for five more years.

In October 31, 2022 Stern interview with Bruce Springsteen was filmed and released as the HBO special The Howard Stern Interview: Bruce Springsteen.

In September 2025, amid speculation about his future at SiriusXM during a summer absence and with his contract nearing expiration, Stern returned to the air and denied rumors he was leaving, fueled in part by an on-air prank involving Andy Cohen that led to false reports he had been replaced. On December 16, 2025, he announced a new three-year SiriusXM extension, stating he had "figured out a way to have it all" with more free time while continuing the show.

=== 2026–present: Show downsizing and HBO Max series ===
In April 2026, Stern and his wife Beth were sued by former executive assistant Leslie Kuhn, alleging a "hostile work environment" and "questionable business operations."

In July 2026, Stern laid off roughly a dozen staffers and announced that, beginning after Labor Day, The Howard Stern Show would air only one new episode per week, with the remainder of the schedule consisting of reruns and archival material. In August, SiriusXM announced that Howard 101 would cease broadcasting on September 1 and be replaced by Andy Cohen’s Radio Andy, leaving Howard 100 as Stern’s sole channel.

Beginning September 14, Howard 100 will introduce a new lineup that includes Wrap Up Wednesdays, an expanded version of Gary Dell’Abate and Jon Hein’s Wrap Up Show, along with additional programming drawn from Stern’s extensive archives. The SiriusXM app will also introduce Howard Stern Decades, organizing archival content from the 1980s, 1990s, 2000s, and 2010s. Additionally, SiriusXM and HBO Max announced an agreement to bring filmed episodes of The Howard Stern Show to the streaming service weekly, beginning September 17 and continuing each Thursday thereafter.

== FCC fines ==
Between 1990 and 2004, the Federal Communications Commission (FCC) fined owners of radio station licensees that carried The Howard Stern Show a total of $2.5 million for content it considered to be indecent.

Stern blamed the Bush administration for increased FCC fines and scrutiny of radio broadcasts in 2004 following the Super Bowl XXXVIII halftime show controversy that February, and that year began openly promoting John Kerry's presidential campaign and urged listeners to oust Bush.

== Views ==
=== Circumcision ===
Stern has been a vocal opponent of male circumcision, and advocated against it strongly in 1998. He has discussed the topic multiple times on various radio shows.

== Political views ==
=== Candidacy for Governor of New York ===
During his March 22, 1994 radio show, Stern announced his candidacy for Governor of New York on the Libertarian ticket, challenging Mario Cuomo. He campaigned on reinstating the death penalty, eliminating highway tolls, and limiting road work to overnight hours, after which he said he would resign. At the party's April 23 convention, Stern won the nomination on the first ballot with 287 of 381 votes, with James Ostrowski finishing second with 34. To appear on the final ballot, he was required to disclose his home address and financial information under the Ethics in Government Act; after a judge denied his request to avoid reporting his income on August 2, Stern withdrew his candidacy two days later, stating, "I spend 25 hours a week telling you all the most intimate details of my life … one fact I've never revealed is how much I make … it's none of your business." In the November election, Cuomo was defeated by George Pataki, whom Stern endorsed. In 1995, Pataki signed a law limiting road construction to night hours in New York City and Long Island, dubbed the "Howard Stern Bill." Stern has since become firmly opposed to the death penalty.

=== Israel ===
Stern is a supporter of Israel and expressed an admiration for Judaism saying "I had experienced a lot of anti-Semitism. But I liked being with other Jews, and I'd go to Jewish summer camp. I never was super religious, but I understood the importance of Israel and of Jews needing a homeland because of persecution. So I'm very pro-Israel on the air."

During the 2014 Gaza War, he defended Israel, saying it was "at no fault" for the situation in Gaza. In 2015, in response to a column written by Roger Waters titled "Israeli oppression of Palestinians" in which he criticized Bon Jovi over performing in Tel Aviv, Stern said "Where do you want the Jews to go Roger? You want them to go for the concentration camps?" In October 2015, the Palestine Liberation Organization U.S. delegation condemned Stern for remarks about Palestinians and Arabs.

=== Presidential elections ===
During the 2004 United States presidential election, Stern supported John Kerry and adamantly opposed George W. Bush for his use of images of September 11 attacks in campaign ads, his stance on same-sex marriage, abortion, and his service in the National Guard.

In the 1990s, Donald Trump frequently appeared on Stern's radio show, and the two maintained a friendly relationship. Trump frequently appeared on his show during his 2000 presidential campaign. In 2016, Stern declined to endorse Trump's 2016 presidential campaign and later supported Hillary Clinton. In May 2020, Stern criticized Trump supporters who listened to his SiriusXM show, saying Trump "despised" his own supporters. In response to Stern's criticisms of Donald Trump, Donald Trump Jr. shared video from the Miss Howard Stern New Year's Eve Pageant in which Stern parodied Ted Danson's Friars Club appearance, wearing blackface and using racial slurs. Stern later acknowledged the behavior, stating, "The shit I did was fucking crazy," and said he has since toned down his show, crediting psychotherapy for his evolution. In June 2022, Stern said he would consider running for president in 2024 if Donald Trump became the Republican nominee again. In 2023, Trump responded to Stern's increasingly sharp criticism by calling him a "broken weirdo."

In April 2024, Stern conducted a one-on-one interview with Joe Biden, his first with a sitting president. In October 2024, he interviewed Vice President Kamala Harris in a live special edition of The Howard Stern Show, later stating he would vote for her. Following the interview, Donald Trump criticized Stern on social media, calling him a "beta male" and accusing him of asking Harris "softball questions."

== Personal life ==
=== Family and relationships ===
Stern met his first wife, Alison Berns, at Boston University through a mutual friend and featured her in a student film about Transcendental Meditation. He later wrote that he knew within a week he would marry her. They wed on June 4, 1978, at Temple Ohabei Shalom in Brookline, Massachusetts, and had three daughters: Emily Beth (b. 1983), Debra Jennifer (b. 1986), and Ashley Jade (b. 1993). The couple separated in October 1999, with Stern citing his work-driven lifestyle, and divorced amicably in 2001. He moved from the home he shared with Berns in Old Westbury, New York into a 4,000-square-foot apartment in Millennium Tower on the Upper West Side of Manhattan which he bought in 1998 for $4.9 million. Stern has since bought a home in Southampton, New York on Long Island.

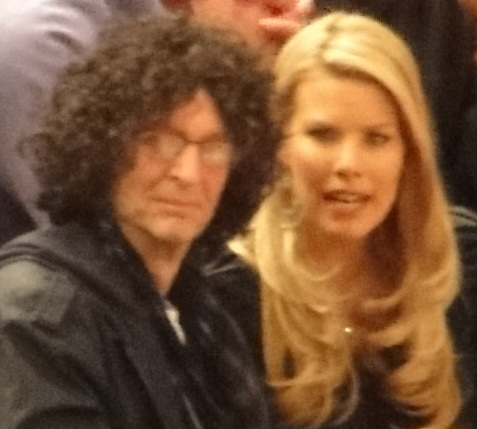
Stern and wife Beth Ostrosky in 2011

Following his separation, Stern dated Angie Everhart and Robin Givens, as well as beginning psychotherapy. In 2000, he started a relationship with model and television host Beth Ostrosky; they became engaged in 2007 and married on October 3, 2008, at Le Cirque in New York City, with Mark Consuelos officiating. In 2017, Stern purchased a home in Palm Beach, Florida, for $52 million. In 2022, Stern announced that his father, Ben Stern, had died at age 99.

=== Other activities ===
Stern's parents began practicing Transcendental Meditation in the early 1970s and encouraged him to learn. He credits the technique with helping him quit smoking, achieve his goals in radio, and manage obsessive–compulsive disorder, which he revealed in Miss America and which began in college and continued into his radio career. As of 1997, he continued to practice it. Stern has interviewed Maharishi Mahesh Yogi, the technique's founder, and thanked him for helping relieve his mother's depression.

In 2006, he disclosed having rhinoplasty and chin liposuction in the 1990s, and in 2012 said he adopted a pescetarian diet. In 2019, he revealed a prior cancer scare after a growth on his kidney was found to be a benign cyst.

Stern is a longtime supporter and fundraiser for North Shore Animal League America. The Sterns have been fostering cats in their Long Island home since 2014. Approximately 200 cats come through their home every year. The Sterns helped establish Bianca's Furry Friends Feline Adoption Center, a cage-free facility at North Shore Animal League America named after their bulldog Bianca, which opened in 2019.

== Filmography ==
=== Film ===
Year	Title	Role	Notes
1986	Ryder, P.I.	Ben Wah, a news reporter	
1997	Private Parts	Himself	Blockbuster Entertainment Award for "Favorite Male Newcomer" (1998); Nominated – Golden Raspberry Award for "Worst New Star" (1998); Nominated – Golden Satellite Award for "Best Male Actor Performance in a Comedy or Musical" (1998)

=== Home video ===
Year	Title
1988	Howard Stern's Negligeé and Underpants Party
1989	Howard Stern's U.S. Open Sores
1992	Butt Bongo Fiesta
1994	Howard Stern's New Year's Rotten Eve 1994

=== Television ===
Year	Title	Channel/Notes
1987	The Howard Stern Show	Fox, five test pilots that never aired
1990–1992	The Howard Stern Show	WWOR-TV and affiliates
1992–1993	The Howard Stern "Interview"	E!
1994–2005	Howard Stern	E!
1998–2001	The Howard Stern Radio Show	CBS affiliates
2005–2013	Howard Stern on Demand (2005–2006); HowardTV (2006–2013)	in DEMAND digital cable
2022	The Howard Stern Interview: Bruce Springsteen	HBO
2026	The Howard Stern Show	HBO

== Discography ==
Year	Album	Label	Notes
1982	50 Ways to Rank Your Mother	Wren Records	Re-released in 1994 as Unclean Beaver on Ichiban/Citizen X labels
1991	Crucified by the FCC	Infinity Broadcasting	
1997	Private Parts: The Album	Warner Bros.	Reached No. 1 on the Billboard 200 chart, certified Platinum

== Bibliography ==
- Stern, Howard; Sloman, Larry (1993). Regan, Judith (ed.). Private Parts. New York: Simon & Schuster. ISBN 978-0671880163. OCLC 28968496.
- Stern, Howard; Sloman, Larry (1995). Regan, Judith (ed.). Miss America. New York: ReganBooks. ISBN 978-0060391676. OCLC 33432817.
- Stern, Howard (2019). Howard Stern Comes Again. New York: Simon & Schuster. ISBN 978-1501194290. OCLC 1042358631.
