= John Hay (disambiguation) =

John Hay (1838–1905) was an American politician; Secretary of State 1898–1905.

John Hay may also refer to:

== Arts and entertainment ==
- John Le Hay (1854–1926), Irish-born singer and actor
- John MacDougall Hay (1879–1919), Scottish novelist
- John Hay (director) (born 1964), English film director

== Law and politics ==
- John Hay (New South Wales politician) (1816–1892), Australian politician
- John B. Hay (1834–1916), American politician
- John Hay (Canadian politician) (1862–1925), Canadian politician
- John Primrose Hay (1878–1949), British MP
- John Hay (Henley MP) (1919–1998), British politician

== Nobility ==
- John Hay, 1st Lord Hay of Yester (c. 1450–c. 1508)
- John Hay, 2nd Lord Hay of Yester (died 1513), Scottish nobleman
- John Hay, 1st Earl of Tweeddale (1593–1653), Scottish aristocrat
- John Hay, 1st Marquess of Tweeddale (1625–1697), Lord Chancellor of Scotland
- John Hay, 12th Earl of Erroll (died 1704), Scottish nobleman
- Sir John Hay of Alderston, 1st Baronet (died 1706)
- John Hay, 2nd Marquess of Tweeddale (1645–1713), Scottish nobleman
- John Hay of Cromlix (1691–1740), Jacobite noble
- John Hay, 4th Marquess of Tweeddale (1695–1762), Scottish nobleman
- John Hay of Restalrig (1705–1781), Jacobite noble
- Sir John Hay, 6th Baronet (1788–1838), British baronet and MP
- Sir John Dalrymple-Hay, 3rd Baronet (1821–1912), British admiral and MP

== Religion ==
- John Hay (Jesuit) (1546–1608), Jesuit scholar and educator
- John Hay (moderator) (1566–1627), Scottish minister
- John Hay (priest) (born 1945), Irish religious figure

== Others ==
- John Hay Drummond Hay (1816–1893), British diplomat
- John Hay (cardiologist) (1873–1959), British physician
- John Hay (footballer) (fl. 1921–1922), Scottish footballer
- John Hay (nature writer) (1915–2011), American author
- John H. Hay (1917–1995), U.S. Army general
- John Hay (academic) (1942–2016), Australian academic

== Other uses ==
- SS John Hay, a Liberty ship

== See also ==
- Lord John Hay (disambiguation)
- John Hays (disambiguation)
- Jonathan Hay (disambiguation)
