= Judith Regan =

American book publisher and talk show host (born 1953)

- Born: August 17, 1953 (age 73); Massachusetts, US
- Occupation: Publisher
- Children: 2

Judith Regan (born August 17, 1953) is an American editor, producer, book publisher, and television and radio talk show host. She is the head of Regan Arts.

== Early life and education ==
Regan grew up in Fitchburg, Massachusetts and Bay Shore, New York. She graduated from Bay Shore High School in 1971. She graduated from Vassar College in Poughkeepsie, New York in 1975 with a bachelor's degree in English and art history. She went on to study art at the School of the Museum of Fine Arts, Boston.

In 1977, she was recruited by The National Enquirer while working as a secretary at the Harvard Institute of Politics.

== Personal life ==
Regan grew up in a large extended Sicilian and Irish family on a farm outside Fitchburg, Massachusetts. Her parents Rita and Leo were both schoolteachers. She is the middle child of two brothers and two sisters.

With psychologist David Buckley, whom she never married, she had son Patrick in 1980 or 1982. In 1987 she married New York City financial planner Robert Kleinschmidt. Their daughter Lara was born in 1991. The couple separated soon after, and were divorced in 2000.

In 2001, she had an affair with Bernard Kerik, the New York City police commissioner and aide to Mayor Rudy Giuliani.

She lives in New York City and Los Angeles.

== Career ==
In the early 1980s, Regan wrote for and edited a number of publications, including National Enquirer. She produced a number of television shows, including Geraldo.

In the mid 1980s, she signed a deal with Simon & Schuster to write two books, including a history of the American family. She later canceled the contract in order to stay home with her young son, who had suffered a head injury after being hit by a drunken driver. Simon & Schuster then offered her a job as an editor, working from home. During this time she worked with Howard Stern and Rush Limbaugh—who called her "Dame" Judith Regan, a reference to Dame Judith Anderson—as well as new novelists such as Wally Lamb, Jess Walter, Walter Kirn, and Douglas Coupland.

She set up the imprint Regan Books with HarperCollins, where she signed new novelist Gregory Maguire, author of Wicked: The Life and Times of the Wicked Witch of the West. Additional books involved in publishing include Confessions of an Ugly Stepsister, Wicked and Son of a Witch, also by Gregory Maguire; Stupid White Men by Michael Moore; Private Parts and Miss America by Howard Stern; The Game: Penetrating the Secret Society of Pickup Artists by Neil Strauss; Story: Substance, Structure, Style, and the Principles of Screenwriting by Robert McKee; Shabby Chic by Rachel Ashwell; She's Come Undone and I Know This Much Is True by Wally Lamb; Juiced by Jose Canseco; Domicilium Decoratus by Kelly Wearstler; Shampoo Planet and Girlfriend in a Coma by Douglas Coupland; Ruby Ridge, Citizen Vince, and Land of the Blind by Jess Walter; and American Soldier by Tommy Franks.

In 2006, Fox announced that Regan had interviewed O. J. Simpson, during which Simpson "confessed" to the 1994 murders of which he had been acquitted. The so-called confession was to air on the Fox network and Regan was to publish Simpson's written confession as a book entitled If I Did It. After harsh criticism, News Corporation cancelled both the book and the interview with Simpson that was to air on the Fox Network, eventually pulping some 400,000 copies. The interview would eventually air on the network in March 2018. Lorraine Brooke Associates, a company run by Simpson's daughter, Arnelle, and whose main shareholders were the Simpson children, negotiated the original book deal with Regan and HarperCollins.

After its publication was cancelled, rights to the book were awarded by court order to murder victim Ron Goldman's family to satisfy a $38 million wrongful death judgment against Simpson, after an earlier judgement by U.S. Bankruptcy Judge Jay Cristol ruled that Lorraine Brooke Associates was a shell company formed to conceal Simpson's book earnings from them. Lorraine Brooke Associates subsequently filed for bankruptcy.

The Goldman family published a revised edition of the book on September 13, 2007, changing the title to [If] I Did It: Confessions of the Killer, with the cover showing the "If" hidden in the "I" in the title. It became a #1 bestseller. News Corp. fired Regan; she sued and won a reported $10 million.

From 1994 to 2004, Regan hosted a number of talk shows, including her own Judith Regan Tonight, a weekend talk show on the Fox News Channel. She hosts a general interest talk radio show on Sirius and XM Satellite Radio.

After losing a bidding war to buy Phaidon Press, in 2013 she became the head of Regan Arts.

== In popular culture ==
A 2007, season 17 episode of Law & Order titled "Murder Book" (episode 387–1716) features a character (Serena Darby) who is based loosely on Regan.

In 2019, she was extensively interviewed for the documentary film Scandalous: The True Story of the National Enquirer, where she once worked.

== Film and television production ==
- Ruby Ridge. Executive Producer. CBS mini-series. 1996.
- Living Out Loud. Actress, Cameo. 1998.
- House Arrest. Executive Producer, HBO. 2005
- Growing Up Gotti. Executive Producer, A&E. 2004–2006.
- When the World Came to Town. Universal. (in turnaround)
- Custody. DreamWorks. (in turnaround)
- The Dive. Producer with James Cameron and Barry Josephson. (in development)
- I Know This Much Is True. Producer. Fox Studios. (in development)
