= Private Parts (book) =

Book by American radio host Howard Stern

- Author: Howard Stern; Larry Sloman
- Cover artist: Jackie Seow (Design); Timothy White (Photo)
- Language: English
- Genre: Memoir; humor
- Publisher: Simon & Schuster
- Publication date: October 7, 1993
- Publication place: United States
- Media type: Hardcover (1993); Paperback (1994, 1997)
- Pages: 448
- ISBN: 978-0-671-88016-3
- Followed by: Miss America

Private Parts is the first book by American radio personality Howard Stern. It was released on October 7, 1993, by Simon & Schuster and edited by Larry "Ratso" Sloman and Judith Regan. By mid-1992, Stern's radio show The Howard Stern Show had become the number one morning program in New York City and had hosted the Saturday night television show The Howard Stern Show on WWOR-TV, since 1990. After development on a feature film for New Line Cinema fell through, Stern secured a deal with Simon & Schuster in early 1993 to write a book.

Private Parts was an instant commercial success upon release. It debuted at number one on The New York Times Best Seller list and remained there for five weeks. After five days, it became the fastest selling title in Simon & Schuster's history. A paperback edition with extra material was released in 1994. The autobiographical chapters of the book were adapted into the 1997 feature film Private Parts, which starred Stern and his radio show staff playing themselves. This release was supported with a second paperback print of the book.

== Background ==
By 1993, Stern had been the host of his morning radio show, The Howard Stern Show, at WXRK in New York City for over six years. In January of that year, the show was syndicated to ten markets and had become the first to be number one in New York City, Los Angeles, and Philadelphia simultaneously. Stern had also landed success in television as the host of The Howard Stern Show on WWOR-TV and The Howard Stern "Interview" on E!. However, development for a feature film with New Line Cinema based on his Fartman character was delayed and ultimately fell through in 1993.

In February 1993, the press reported that Stern had entered talks with publisher Simon & Schuster to write a book. Stern was approached by the publisher and found the project an attractive one as it would help strengthen his self-proclaimed title of "King of All Media". He believed that they wanted him following the success of The Way Things Ought to Be, the first book by popular conservative radio host Rush Limbaugh, which generated strong sales and became a success on The New York Times Best Seller list. Stern accepted, partly for the "great advance" that was offered, which was estimated to be worth over $1 million, and that Simon & Schuster was a prestigious company. On March 23, 1993, Stern held a live press conference on his radio show to announce the deal and aimed for a release in October of that year. A major factor for Stern to write a book was due to his dissatisfaction with the number of times he had been misquoted or paraphrased in print or television, itself a reason why he resisted in granting press interviews. By writing a book himself, Stern said that "it will at least be my words." Stern added that he wanted to write a book that dealt with honest opinions because it was something that people "don't deal with honesty any more." He cited honesty as the reason why audiences respond to him, yet thought the book would reveal a side to him that his fans were not familiar with. At this time of the book's announcement, Stern had considered to dedicate the book to singer Cher.

When Stern announced the book, he said that his initial suggestion of Mein Kampf: Settling Accounts, a spin on Mein Kampf by Adolf Hitler, for the book's title, was rejected by the publisher as it would be unpopular with Jewish readers. Another early title of Sort of the World According to Howard was reported in the following month.

== Writing ==
Stern wrote the book in approximately six months. He thought it was going to be easy to produce at first, but he looked back on the project as the most difficult of his career at the time. He saw the temptation in taking "three or four of my old bits" and adapting them into a book for a rush release, but he aimed for a quality product with strong material that would help him gain new fans. A typical day saw Stern return home from doing his radio show and write until dinner or around 8 p.m. He predicted that he could complete the book in three months, but he only managed to produce an outline of the book in that time. Stern wrote the book with assistance from editors Larry "Ratso" Sloman and Judith Regan. Regan lived in Stern's guest house for six weeks over the summer of 1993 with her then two-year-old daughter and nanny to help complete the book on time. Sloman also stayed over at Stern's house on weekends. One of the researchers hired to work on the book transcribed segments of Stern's radio show and interviews with his parents to produce around 10,000 words of text for Regan to go through. She assured that despite her input, "the words are Howard's". Stern described Sloman's involvement as a "collaborator" and worked on selecting the best material for the book. Sloman suggested to have one sponsor for each chapter of the book, an idea that Stern liked but fell through.

Around the time of the book's announcement, Stern attempted to find his writing voice by sketching initial ideas onto paper and teaming with his radio show producer Gary Dell'Abate to retrace his career, emphasising on stories and anecdotes from behind the scenes. He later said that he approached the book in the same way as his radio show, talking like "I'm sitting around with a bunch of guys." Stern wrote the majority of the book in his basement office at his home on Long Island, New York, using his computer or dictating passages into a tape recorder. Stern later found out that his wife would enter his office when he was asleep and read some pages, offering encouragement or complaints to what he had written. Stern was able to complete the book using a computer archive that he had a friend start nine years earlier, which indexed each radio show by subject matter and scans of every newspaper article about him.

Each chapter of the book features a different girl holding a card indicating the chapter number. Stern shaved off his body hair for the photo shoot.

Other early book titles included War and Piss, I, Moron, I, Moron: King of All Idiots, and Penis; the latter was considered due to the hilarity of the potential newspaper headline: "Howard Stern's 'Penis' is a best seller". By August 1993, as a compromise with the rejections, Stern and the publisher reached a compromise with Private Parts, first suggested by Stern's co-host, Robin Quivers. Stern aimed for a title that would attract readers and not turn any particular group off from buying the book. He went on to use "Mein Kampf" as the title to a chapter in the book which details his early career. Stern wrote a chapter about the ongoing FCC fines against his radio show, "but it was so convoluted it wasn't going to make anyone laugh", so it was scrapped. Other chapters that were not included detailed his rise to number one in Philadelphia and his WWOR-TV show. Stern changed some of the women's names that he had slept with while attending Boston University to protect their identities.

Stern picked psychotherapists Sheenah Hankin and Richard Wessler, who were not aware of him, to read the book and give an analysis. Their eight-page profile on Stern closes the book. Stern recalled the difficulty he had in reading it and entered a state of denial initially, before he realised there was a substantial amount of truth to what they had written. While writing the book, Stern asked Chaunce Hayden, editor of Steppin Out, to supply quotes about him from celebrity interviews published in the magazine. Hayden produced quotes from fifty celebrities and said it was worth the time and effort because he was a big fan of Stern. In the book, Stern mistakenly credited Hayden as "Chaunce Howell". When the book was finished Stern was informed that he was around 45,000 words too long which required some chapters to be rewritten.

== Cover ==
Simon & Schuster rejected an early cover that featured Stern and two naked blonde women holding his crotch. The publisher had it altered, removing the women entirely and covering Stern's genital area with a banner presenting the book's title. The shots that were rejected were printed in the book.

== Release ==
Private Parts was released on October 7, 1993, receiving an initial printing of 250,000 copies. A spokesman for Simon & Schuster said that between 50,000 and 75,000 copies were sold on the first day. On the following day, the publisher ordered a second printing of 500,000 copies, the largest single print order in its history which surpassed the previous record of 400,000 copies for The Way Things Ought to Be by Limbaugh. Five days after the book's release, Private Parts became the fastest selling title in the publisher's history. By October 26, 1993, the book was in its eighth printing with over one million copies in circulation. In November 1995, the book had sold 1.1 million copies.

The sales were supported by Stern's book signing tour of various cities across the United States, with the largest crowd attendances ever. The first was held at Barnes and Noble in New York City on October 14, 1993. A book party was held on October 27.

The success was in spite of mixed reviews and the refusal by several stores to carry the book over objections to its content. On the day of release Sapak Inc., a California-based wholesaler that supplied books to various stores, cancelled its order of the book as it deemed its content too risque for its "family oriented" customers. The Caldor chain of department stores modified the New York Times Best Seller list which was displayed in stores to remove Private Parts from the top position, moving all subsequent books up one. The inclusion of the book in library lists was also frequently challenged in subsequent years. The book spent five weeks at the top of the non-fiction list from the weeks of October 9 to November 6, 1993, before being displaced by See, I Told You So by Rush Limbaugh. Private Parts spent a total of twenty weeks on the NY Times Best Seller list, hitting the number one spot after a week of its release.

With the considerable audience from his radio show, Stern was able to sell the first printing of his book within hours of its release. This was in spite of a perception of Stern's listeners who were considered to not be given to reading books, or even illiterate. The strong sales were seen as reflection of his populist appeal to a middle-class white male demographic who compose a large part of the fan base of his show. The main reason given for his appeal at the time was as backlash from a push towards what was considered political correctness.

Upon release, Private Parts became the fastest selling title in Simon & Schuster's history. It was later adapted into a film in 1997 starring Stern and his radio show staff as themselves.

== Reception ==
The book received mixed reviews from critics, frequently drawing comparisons to Lenny Bruce's 1965 autobiography How to Talk Dirty and Influence People. Like Stern's radio show, it received a great deal of opposition due to its content. It is number 86 on the American Library Association's list of the "100 Most Frequently challenged books Between 1990 and 1999." A paperback edition was released in September 1994, where Pocket Books, a division of Simon & Schuster, printed a further 2.8 million copies. In late 1995, Stern published a second book called Miss America.

Stern's venture into literature drew much of the same criticism as his radio show. While Private Parts received some positive comparisons to Bruce's book, it was also characterized as nothing more than an extension of his radio show with little more to offer. Stern was praised for his populist message and attracting a group of people who normally do not read either by choice or for lack of ability. Another frequent criticism was that the material was juvenile, with little more to offer than stories of "breasts, behinds, penises, masturbation, defecation, and the expulsion of gas".

Of those who compared it to Bruce's 1965 autobiography, in some instances the comparison was favorable, citing Stern's as the best book by a comedian since Bruce's. Others felt Stern fell short of the mark, or at least not influencing people as suggested by his ratings in certain radio markets.

As the host of a highly rated radio show, the comparison between the book and his radio show was inevitable. The radio show was often the starting point from which the reviewer based their opinion of the book. Sometimes the praise for the book came in spite of the critic's distaste for the show, but often it was used to damn the book as nothing more than a collection of radio show highlights in print, but in more explicit detail. Critics would sometimes qualify that they could not adequately relay the stories because of their papers' editorial standards.

Another frequent observation about the book was that it was juvenile both in its topics and layout, regularly compared to Bruce's book. This included being compared to a comic book for its heavy use of pictures and varying fonts. Margo Jefferson of the New York Times enjoyed the way it broke up the book, as this allowed readers to read the passages out of sequence. The reliance on stories of body parts, functions, and human sexuality were also cited as a reason for what constituted the entirety of the book, and were not seen as compelling to some readers. In one instance the review was given by a high school student.

== Publication history ==
- Stern, Howard (1993), Private Parts (1st edition – Hardcover), New York: Simon & Schuster (Published on October 7, 1993), ISBN 978-0-671-88016-3, OCLC 28968496
- Stern, Howard (1994), Private Parts (2nd edition – Mass Market Paperback), New York: Simon & Schuster (Published in September 1994), ISBN 978-0-671-51043-5
- Stern, Howard (1997), Private Parts (3rd edition – Mass Market Paperback – 1997 Motion Picture), New York: Simon & Schuster (Published on March 1, 1997), ISBN 978-0-671-00944-1
