= Jonathan Hay =

Jonathan Hay may refer to:

- Jonathan Hay (runner) (born 1992), British distance runner
- Jonathan Hay (footballer) (born 1979), Australian rules footballer
- Jonathan Hay (publicist) (born 1975), American celebrity publicist and record producer

== See also ==
- John Hay (disambiguation)
