= Private Parts (1997 film) =

1997 film by Betty Thomas

- Theatrical release poster
- Directed by: Betty Thomas
- Screenplay by: Len Blum; Michael Kalesniko
- Based on: Private Parts by Howard Stern
- Produced by: Ivan Reitman; Jessica Matthews
- Starring: Howard Stern; Robin Quivers; Mary McCormack
- Cinematography: Walt Lloyd
- Edited by: Peter Teschner
- Music by: Rob Zombie; The Dust Brothers; Porno for Pyros; Marilyn Manson
- Production companies: Northern Lights Entertainment; Rysher Entertainment
- Distributed by: Paramount Pictures
- Release dates: February 27, 1997 (The Theater at Madison Square Garden); March 7, 1997 (United States)
- Running time: 109 minutes
- Country: United States
- Language: English
- Budget: $28 million
- Box office: $41.2 million

Private Parts is a 1997 American biographical comedy film produced by Ivan Reitman and directed by Betty Thomas. The film is an adaptation of the autobiographical chapters from the best-selling 1993 book of the same name by radio personality Howard Stern, developed from a script by Len Blum and Michael Kalesniko. It follows Stern's life from boyhood and his rise to success in radio. Stern and several of his radio show staff star as themselves, including newscaster and co-host Robin Quivers, producers Fred Norris and Gary Dell'Abate, and comedian Jackie Martling. The film also stars Mary McCormack, Allison Janney, Michael Murphy, and Paul Giamatti.

When a proposed film featuring Stern as his superhero character Fartman fell through, development for a new film began in 1994, several months after the book Private Parts was released. Stern signed with Rysher Entertainment, who agreed to fund its production, and teamed with Reitman, who thought a biographical take on Stern's life was best suited for a film. Production was delayed after Stern rejected 22 scripts from several screenwriters until he accepted one developed by Blum and Kalesniko in late 1995. Filming took place in the New York City area and Washington, D.C., in 1996 with a budget of $28 million, during which Stern continued to host his radio show each weekday morning. Numerous celebrities and family members of the radio show staff make cameo appearances in the film. The soundtrack is compiled of songs from several rock bands as well as two original tracks featuring Stern performing with Rob Zombie and the Dust Brothers.

The film premiered on February 27, 1997, at The Theater at Madison Square Garden and was theatrically released on March 7 by Paramount Pictures. It debuted at number one at the U.S. box office in its opening weekend with a gross of $14.6 million and earned a domestic total of $41.2 million. It received mostly positive reviews from film critics, a group whom Stern made a conscious effort to please, including those who did not listen to the radio show nor were fans of his. In 1998, the film was released on DVD, and Stern won a Blockbuster Award for Favorite Male Newcomer for his performance. Stern shot additional scenes for a censored version of the film prior to its premiere television broadcast on the USA Network in 1999.

== Plot ==
Following his appearance at the MTV Video Music Awards as his superhero character Fartman, radio personality Howard Stern boards his flight home and finds himself seated next to a stranger named Gloria who is visibly repelled by him. Stern, thinking she sees him as a moron, begins to tell his life story, starting with the verbal abuse he received as a young child from his father Ben. Stern has always dreamed of being on the radio after visiting his father's recording studio but grows up to be a quiet, socially awkward guy. He decides to work in radio and studies communications at Boston University. He becomes a DJ at WTBU, the college station, and meets his girlfriend Alison.

After graduating, Howard works at WRNW in Briarcliff Manor, New York, and is promoted to program director, which allows him to marry Alison. He leaves the station after being asked to fire a fellow DJ and moves to WCCC in Hartford, Connecticut, where he befriends DJ Fred Norris. Howard adopts a more casual attitude on the air, becoming more open and up front. He and Fred attend the premiere of actress Brittany Fairchild's new film. The three leave early for Fairchild's hotel room, where she strips for a bath and convinces Howard and Fred to join in. Brittany's behavior becomes more sexual, and an embarrassed Howard leaves. When Alison finds his wet underwear in their car and believes he has been unfaithful, she leaves him. Howard leaves Hartford for WWWW in Detroit, Michigan, and is miserable, but Alison goes to Detroit and forgives him. WWWW then switches to country music and Howard quits.

Howard starts at WWDC in Washington, D.C., in 1981 and meets his news anchor Robin Quivers, whom he encourages to riff with him on the air. They refuse orders from boss Dee Dee for constantly breaking format. One of their antics, in which Howard assists a female caller to reach orgasm, almost gets him fired until a ratings boost forces Dee Dee to keep him and hire Fred to the team. Meanwhile Alison announces her pregnancy, but it ends in miscarriage. Although they cheer each other up by joking about it, Howard makes light of the situation on the air, which greatly upsets Alison.

When Alison becomes pregnant again, Howard gets his dream offer to work in New York City at WNBC, where he has the chance to become a nationwide success. However, upper management at NBC hired Howard not realizing what his show was like until they see a news report about him. Program director Kenny Rushton, whom Howard refers to as Pig Vomit, offers to keep Howard in line or he will force him to quit. Howard, Fred, and Robin ignore Kenny's restrictions on content until a risqué Match Game with comedian Jackie Martling causes Rushton to fire Robin. The show fails with her absence, and her replacement quits after Howard's interview with an actress who swallows a kielbasa sausage. Robin is eventually brought back, but Howard's antics continue with a naked woman in the studio, resulting in Kenny cutting off the broadcast. Howard gets the show back on the air and gets into a physical altercation with Kenny in his office.

In 1985 Howard becomes number one at WNBC, and Kenny tries to gain Howard's friendship but is promptly turned down. Howard thanks his fans with an outdoor concert by AC/DC. During the performance Alison is rushed to the hospital and gives birth to a girl. The film then cuts back to the flight, revealing that Howard has told his story to Gloria. Though he believes he could pick her up, Howard remains faithful and meets Alison at the airport as his daughters run to greet him.

During the end credits Stuttering John rants about his absence in the film. At the Oscars Mia Farrow then presents an Academy Award for Best Actor to Howard, who appears as Fartman once again, but Howard falls from mid-air and the audience applauds. Having left radio, Kenny now manages a shopping mall in Alabama and blames Howard for his downfall. During his outbursts his swearing is drowned out by jackhammer noises.

== Cast ==
- Howard Stern as himself / The Narrator
  - Bobby Boriello as 7-year-old Howard
  - Michael Maccarone as 12-year-old Howard
  - Matthew Friedman as 16-year-old Howard
- Robin Quivers as herself
- Mary McCormack as Alison Stern
- Fred Norris as himself
- Paul Giamatti as Kenny "Pig Vomit" Rushton
- Gary Dell'Abate as himself
- Jackie Martling as himself
- Carol Alt as Gloria
- Kelly Bishop as Ray Stern
- Henry Goodman as Moti
- Jonathan Hadary as Griff
- Paul Hecht as Ross Buckingham
- Allison Janney as Dee Dee
- Michael Murphy as Roger Elick
- James Murtaugh as Payton
- Richard Portnow as Ben Stern
- Reni Santoni as Vin Vallesecca
- Lee Wilkof as Marvin Mamoulian
- Jenna Jameson as Mandy
- Adam LeFevre as Sales Manager
- Sasha Martin as Emily Beth Stern
- Sarah Hyland as Debra Jennifer Stern
- Melanie Good as Brittany Fairchild
- Leslie Bibb as NBC Page
- Camille Donatacci Grammer as Camille, The Card Girl
- Edie Falco as Alison's Friend
- Amber Smith as Julie
- Janine Lindemulder as Camp Director's Wife
- Michael Gwynne as Duke of Rock
- Alison Stern (Stern's then wife) as WNBC Receptionist
- Nancy Sirianni, (Martling's then wife) as Extra in the film festival scene, seated in front of Stern
- Allison Furman-Norris (Norris' wife) as a WNBC Receptionist
- Theresa Lynn as Orgasm Woman
- Althea Cassidy as The Kielbasa Queen

As themselves and cameo appearances

- David Letterman
- Mia Farrow
- Crackhead Bob
- Nicole Bass
- AC/DC (Brian Johnson, Angus Young, Malcolm Young, Phil Rudd, Cliff Williams)
- "Stuttering John" Melendez
- Ozzy Osbourne
- Dee Snider
- Tiny Tim (posthumous)
- John Stamos
- Flavor Flav
- John Popper
- Slash
- Ted Nugent
- MC Hammer

== Production ==
=== Origins ===
By 1992 Stern had experienced a rise in popularity as a radio and television personality. In July he struck a deal with New Line Cinema to produce a film based on his superhero character Fartman, which he devised in July 1981 when he hosted mornings at WWDC in Washington, D.C. He first announced the film, which Stern claimed "came from nowhere ... top of my head", during an appearance on The Tonight Show with Jay Leno. That November, Variety reported that screenwriter J. F. Lawton was hired to write and direct the film titled The Adventures of Fartman. The film, which was budgeted between $8 and $11 million, was expected to go into production in May 1993 with David Permut assigned as producer under his Permut Presentations banner. According to Lawton, The Adventures of Fartman revolved around the superhero and his alter ego, a magazine publisher in the mold of Screw magazine's Al Goldstein. On June 28, 1993, Lawton revealed more information for Time magazine: "There's a lot of nudity, some harsh language, a lesbian love scene, and the main character works for an underground sex magazine. We told New Line Cinema the plot, and they said, 'Yeah, it sounds great. But can't we make it PG-13?'" Soon after, Stern became unhappy with the idea of making a PG-rated film and had disputes with New Line Cinema over the merchandising rights. Coupled with the quality of the scripts being drafted, the project was shelved in 1993 before the production could begin. Its cancellation affected Stern, who became depressed — "I'd gone on air and said, 'I'm going to make a movie.' I sort of felt like a liar. I looked like I had failed."

=== Development ===
A film project remained inactive until the release of Stern's first book, the part memoir and part commentary Private Parts, in October 1993. It became the fastest selling book in publisher Simon & Schuster's history after five days of release. In the following month, Stern's agent had started to contact film studios with the aim of adapting the book into a feature film. In the following months, Stern entered an agreement with film and television content management company Rysher Entertainment, who wished to provide funding for a film. This led to Stern working with Rysher founder Keith Samples, Paramount producer David Kirkpatrick, director John G. Avildsen in September 1994 and, in August 1994, screenwriter Peter Torokvei, who was hired to complete a "production rewrite" of a script already prepared. Torokvei claimed a set of line producers, production secretary, and film coordinators had "seemed to be in place" upon his arrival to New York City, but the project underwent the first of several delays over the film's story. Torokvei completed a draft, but it was not signed off.

Stern, who had the power of final script approval, went on to reject around 22 subsequent revisions, sometimes from day to day, as he grew dissatisfied with their content. Torokvei estimated he had worked on as many as five redrafts with Stern, adding: "On any given scene we did the day before, [Stern] would say, 'That's old,' or 'That's boring.' He wanted to freshen the scenes every day. I'd have to remind him that it had worked the day before". In one abandoned version, Stern recalled a scene that had former radio show regular Richard Simmons "in a tutu in my house chasing my children and saying he can't baby-sit them. How fucking ridiculous." Around this time, Kirkpatrick had mentioned a film with as many as 75 cameo appearances, including Arnold Schwarzenegger and radio show regular Jessica Hahn. In addition to Torokvei, assistance over the scripts were developed by Michael Kalesniko, co-author of Private Parts Larry "Ratso" Sloman, Laurice Elehwany, and Rick Copp. Kalesniko recalled a note that detailed Stern riding down Fifth Avenue on an elephant. He said that Kirkpatrick saw the film as an "Annie Hall for the nineties". Following several script rejections, Avildsen ceased his involvement with the film by November 1994. Kirkpatrick claimed Avildsen wished for a "story of an underdog taking on the issue of free speech—a man against the system", whereas Kirkpatrick had the idea of a film "in the tradition of Help! (1965) and A Hard Day's Night (1964)".

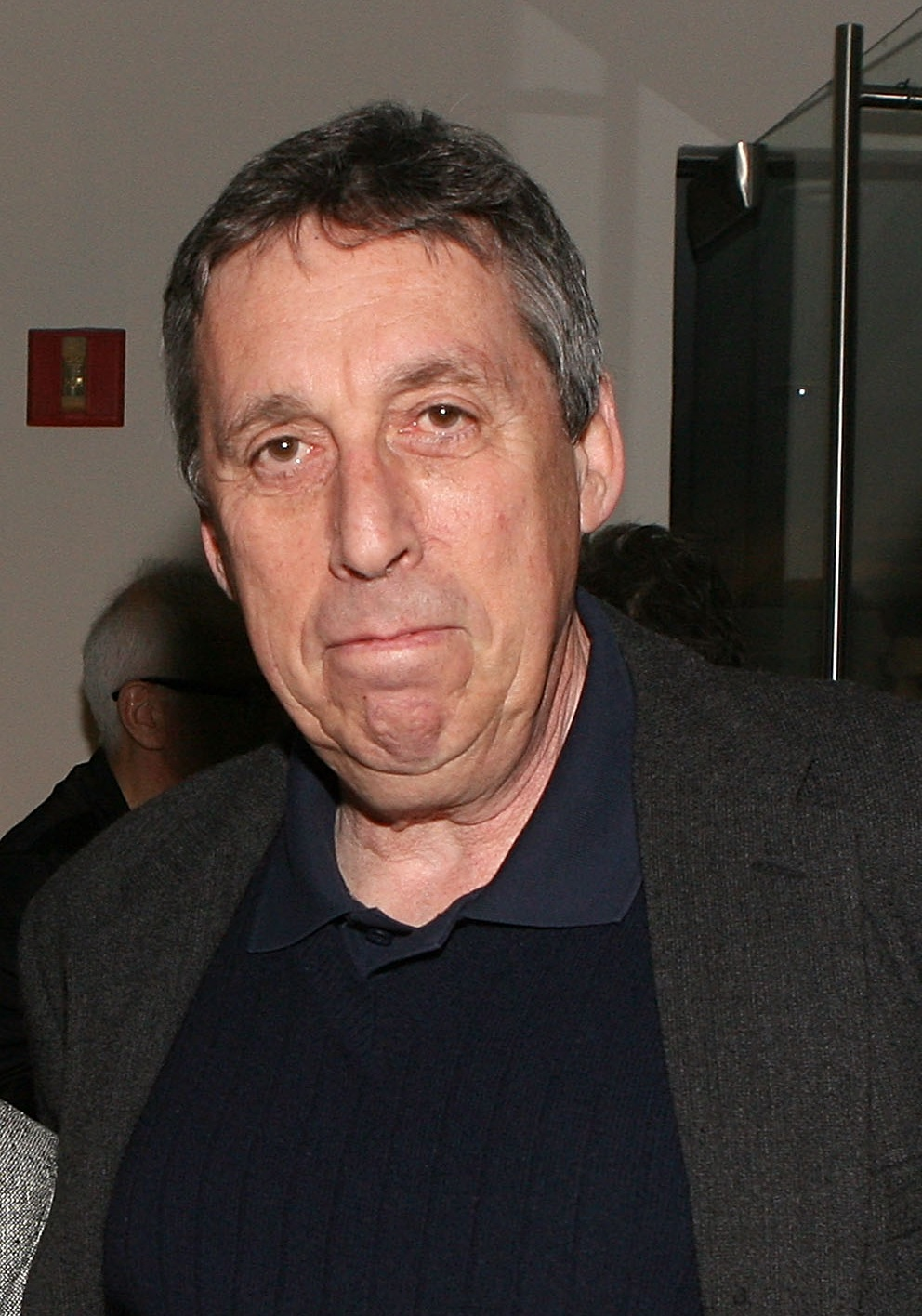
Ivan Reitman, producer of the film

By February 1995, Stern had yet to approve a final script. The studio executives believed Stern rejected so many drafts because he was too afraid to be in a feature film, and so suggested Jeff Goldblum to play as himself. Stern insisted he was not afraid, and felt the idea of someone other than himself playing the role would lead to "the biggest box office bomb in history". Following Avildsen's departure, Stern turned to producer and director Ivan Reitman for his thoughts on the rejected scripts as he thought Reitman "could see if I was being unreasonable". A long time fan of Stern's, Reitman had suggested as early as 1991 that Stern make a film about his life and pitched his vision, a biographical film with Stern starring as himself, "almost documentary in feel", as he believed one based on real events from his life, rather than "a fantasy life for him that was silly and salacious", were strong and funny enough for a film. Stern agreed, and subsequently asked Reitman to come on board as producer and help develop a script. Reitman focused on a script that centered more on what Stern was like off the air, and brought in writer Len Blum to help with the task and brought Kalesniko back into the fold; Blum was sceptical about working on the film because he did not understand Stern's appeal, but his opinion changed after Reitman brought him to New York City to sit in on Stern's radio show for two days. Blum said, "On the flight home I asked myself, 'Should I do this?' And I realized I had laughed harder in the last two days than I had in the past 20 years." In the following months, Blum and Kalesniko collaborated on a script with Stern that he finally approved, which then underwent further revisions for Blum to incorporate Stern's improvisations and speech patterns. During his visit to the show, Blum talked to Quivers, Norris, Dell'Abate, and Melendez about how they first met Stern and recorded the conversations. In a November 1995, interview during promotion of his second book Miss America, Stern announced: "It's bizarre and funny. We're green-lighted to go into production".

Stern wished for Reitman to direct and produce the film, but Reitman suggested Betty Thomas for the role having worked together on The Late Shift. Thomas was not a fan of Stern's, but her boyfriend was an avid listener and Reitman pushed her to read the script. She thought it was "very interesting", and travelled to New York City to observe Stern doing his radio show. "After a while, Howard came out. When he took my hand, he was shaking. He was so vulnerable and scared. I couldn't believe it. I saw something in his eyes that I loved. Right then, I wanted to do the movie." Stern found Thomas particularly enjoyable to work with, and praised the calming effect she had on him during shooting.

=== Pre-production and casting ===
Auditions for roles began before Stern had accepted a final script. On October 8, 1994, auditions for actors to play a pre-teen, mid-teen, and late-teen Stern were held at the Palladium in New York City. The sessions were organised by casting director Avy Kaufman. Auditions were also planned in Burbank, California, Chicago, and Cleveland. Four scenes for the actors were set up: Stern preparing for a date while reciting a soliloquy on the human condition, a talk with his father on current events, making a prank call, and attempting to hide the evidence after smoking in his bedroom. Subsequent casting was overseen by Phyllis Huffman. Savoy Pictures was going to distribute the film, but due to financial troubles, it was transferred to Paramount Pictures.

Stern formally announced the film and the start of pre-production on his radio show on February 13, 1996, when Reitman and Thomas appeared as guests. Reitman estimated the process would last for ten weeks. Casting was done in the subsequent three months. In April 1996, McCormack was cast as the role of Stern's wife Allison. Stern had initial doubts about her, describing her as perhaps "too fancy", but Thomas insisted she was the right choice after their initial try out scene. Julia Louis-Dreyfus was an early choice, but she backed out because she wanted to spend time with her family. Thomas had a choice between Giamatti or Philip Seymour Hoffman as the role of Pig Vomit, and remembered both were "kind of good" but "a little nervous". It was when Giamatti did something she described as "so out of character, weird and interesting" in an audition that convinced her that he was the one for the part.

In June 1996, television host David Letterman makes a cameo appearance for a scene that recreated one of Stern's early appearances on his show Late Night with David Letterman in the 1980s. Paramount wanted to use the real footage in the film but was unable to obtain permission, so Letterman agreed to take part. The show's stage and set was reproduced, but Letterman refused to wear a hairpiece that matched his hairstyle at the time. Model Carol Alt stars as Gloria. Initially, Alt had little interest in appearing in the film because she wanted "to stay uncontroversial and classy" and avoid being associated with Stern's "crazy image", but she changed her mind after reading the script and later praised Reitman for its quality. In June 1996, auditions were held in New York City for the role of Mandy, a part that had seven lines of dialogue with full frontal nudity. As many as 25 women tried out for the role, including some who worked as topless dancers, but producers rejected all of them on the basis of their appearance or quality of acting. The role was given to porn star Jenna Jameson.

Actor Richard Portnow secured the role as Stern's father Ben. Portnow met Ben in person, and picked up various idiosyncrasies from him which he incorporated into his acting, such as gesticulating his finger whenever he speaks. The film features actor Luke Reilly portraying Don Imus, a longtime rival of Stern's who hosted mornings at WNBC. The woman who played Irene the Leather Weather Lady was the same person who called into Stern's radio show while he worked at WWWW in 1980, and is considered to be the earliest member of Stern's Wack Pack. During his preparation in acting as his younger self, Stern listened to tapes of his radio shows from his twenties, noticing his voice "locked in this very high register". At one point, Stern asked Thomas if he should take acting lessons before filming, and watched a "how-to" video by Michael Caine that Thomas had given him. Stern donned several customised wigs throughout the film and never displayed his real hair.

=== Filming ===
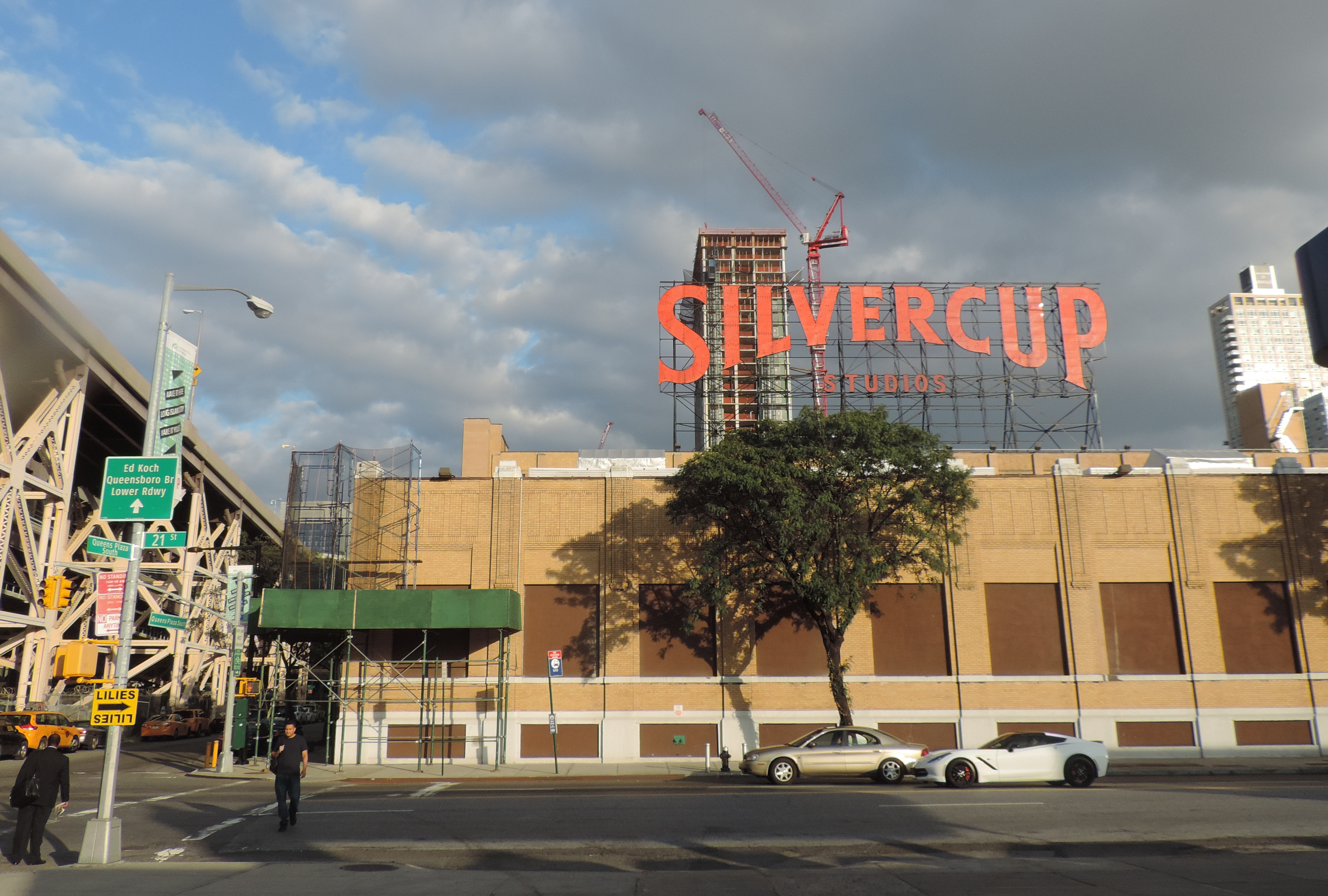
Silvercup Studios in New York City, one of the filming locations

Principal photography began on May 2, 1996, with Northern Lights Productions in charge of filming. Shooting took place in several locations—Westchester, New York, Washington, D.C., New Jersey, and the Manhattan, the Bronx, Queens, and Brooklyn areas of New York City. Interior shots were filmed at Silvercup Studios in Long Island City. Stern would do his radio show from 6:00 a.m. until around 10:30 a.m. and travel to the set straight after to resume shooting. Make up would last three to four hours, followed by filming until as late as 9:00 pm. At one point, filming only took place from Thursday to Monday and lasted until 11:00 pm. A temporary apartment was built on the Silvercup lot for Stern to live in while shooting took place in order to remove the need for him to commute to and from his family home in Long Island. Interior scenes, including the reconstruction of seven replica radio studios where Stern worked in his career, were reconstructed at the Silvercup. Stern requested that he operate real and working radio equipment in the replica studios so he could hear himself talk. The scenes at WRNW were filmed in the same building that housed the real radio station in Briarcliff Manor, New York.

Ivan was there, Betty, the whole gang ... the pace was so slow. I'm just so used to doing something spontaneously. I was going crazy. I went home that night and said, 'I don't want to be doing this. This is a mistake.' I was practically in tears.

— Stern on his first day of filming

The improvised and unscripted vignettes with Dell'Abate were the first scenes to be shot, and he was only given a premise for a scene several minutes before filming. Some of the scenes were attempts to recreate real life scenarios from working on the radio show, such as Dell'Abate trying to convince a woman to get topless after she had changed her mind. Thomas filmed them during pre-production in March 1996 to avoid shooting them during the main production schedule and wanted to present a new season in each vignette. One day of filming with Dell'Abate and Camille Donatacci was arranged in Westchester, New York on a day that it was due to snow. Eli Roth worked as a production assistant during this time. Stern as Hopalong Howie at WWWW was the first of his scenes that was filmed. He recalled he had "no confidence" in his ability at that point, and struggled with the concept of shooting a film to a set script. It took three days for Stern to settle down; Thomas noticed Stern during this time was "a little tight, trying too hard". Reitman noticed a considerable improvement in Stern's acting after several weeks of filming as he became more comfortable in front of the camera. Portnow noticed Stern enjoyed the process as filming went along, picking up "mechanics of doing take after take very quickly" and the ease of altering his delivery of lines in different ways. Thomas recalled Quivers being "really, really" nervous on set. The scenes inside the plane with Alt were shot inside a Lockheed L-1011 TriStar parked at Newark Liberty International Airport. For the scenes that featured a young Stern in high school, filming was done at Union High School, which comedian Artie Lange, who was part of the radio show from 2001 to 2009, graduated from. Several scenes during Stern's college years were filmed at Lehman College in the Bronx. A metal stunt penis was placed in Stern's trousers to create the illusion of an erection during the film premiere screening scene. The night when Stern meets Alison for the first time in Boston was shot at the Park Slope neighborhood of Brooklyn. Northern Lights offered nearby residents three-day parking vouchers in nearby lots to encourage them to move their cars.

Stern recalled that Jameson was so comfortable being naked on the set, she stayed without clothes when the crew were at the craft service table. The scene where Stern apologizes to McCormack at his hotel, actress Teri Hatcher had visited the set and was standing several feet away from the camera. Stern had difficulty in achieving a satisfactory reaction for the scene where he finds out that Alison is pregnant. Thomas assisted by approaching Stern and telling him that she had been diagnosed with ovarian cancer, which was in fact a lie. Stern's genuine response and shock to the news produced what Thomas was looking for, and Stern used that as a guide for his subsequent on-screen reactions. During one particular break in filming McCormack smoked a cigarette while wearing a pregnant costume, which attracted several concerned looks from members of the public. The AC/DC concert scene was filmed at New York's Bryant Park in July 1996.

Filming was set to finish on July 30, 1996, but it was extended until mid-August. Following a wrap-up party held to commemorate the end of filming, Stern had booked a consultation for rhinoplasty in early September 1996 before he was to start promoting the film. Shortly before it, however, Thomas informed him that several scenes had to be re-shot and a change in his appearance would affect the film's continuity. Reitman asked Stern to avoid surgery until production was complete as Paramount owned his face. Stern asked Thomas to cut one shot that was filmed on his "bad side" which he thought made his nose look bad, but Thomas had not filmed it from an alternate angle and kept it in. In October 1996, Stern flew to Los Angeles to view a rough cut of the film that was around 2 1/2 hours in length, among a small audience in Reitman's personal theater. Around 45 minutes of footage was to be cut. Among the scenes that were filmed but not used included one filmed at the Brooklyn Academy of Music, where Stern and John Stamos were on stage dressed in just a towel covering their lower half, with women in the crowd of 800 people urging them to drop their towels. A man found a collection of video tapes containing several dailies of the film in a recycling bin, and returned them to Stern. The final reshoots took place in New York City and Washington, D.C. over a three-day period from November 22, 1996. Stern kept the trip a secret to prevent fans from disrupting filming. As he had undergone surgery by this time, so Thomas had to film him at a distance to make it harder to spot differences in his appearance. On November 25, Stern announced on his radio show that filming was complete.

=== Post-production ===
Thomas said the film was difficult to edit as Stern "never used the same words twice" for each take. During the Christmas period in 1996, the film was subject to a test screening in California. In January 1997, test screenings were held in San Jose, California and Seattle, Washington, the latter of which Stern's radio show was not syndicated to at the time. Stern was told the audience gave the film the highest positive response since Forrest Gump (1994) and one Indiana Jones film.

=== Music ===
Stern recorded his parts to "Tortured Man" in December 1996 with writing assistance from Martling and Norris.

== Release ==
=== Promotion ===
Stern underwent an extensive media tour to promote the film, appearing on several television shows and granting magazine and newspaper interviews. He was a cover feature of Rolling Stone magazine for the second time in his career. Stern also appeared on the front covers of Movieline, Vanity Fair, MAD, Penthouse, Entertainment Weekly, and TV Guide. The tour included a visit to Los Angeles. Stern appeared at the end of an episode of Wheel of Fortune that aired on the same day as the premiere, giving host Vanna White flowers and a gift while plugging the film.

=== Theatrical run ===
Private Parts premiered in New York City at The Theater at Madison Square Garden on February 27, 1997. The star-studded event, attended by 4,200 people, included a live performance of "The Great American Nightmare" by Stern and Zombie, and Porno for Pyros on a stage built outside the venue. The film's theatrical wide release in the United States followed on March 7 to 2,138 theaters. In its opening weekend, it ranked first place in the North American box office with a gross of $14,616,333, averaging a gross of $6,836 per theater. Jungle 2 Jungle came in second place. In its second week, the film dropped to third place. The number of theaters screening the film rose in its third week to a peak of 2,217 before the number decreased to its low of 1,848 a week later. At the end of its theatrical run in the United States, the film grossed a total of $41,230,799, coming in as the 56th highest-grossing film of 1997 in the country.

To promote the film in the European markets, Stern attended the 1997 Cannes Film Festival in Cannes, France, on May 12. He appeared at the festival with two topless women and a 40-foot inflatable picture of himself placed on the shore by the event provided by Rysher. The balloon attracted French security who threatened to shoot it down before Rysher associates agreed to take it down. It was reinflated after French president Jacques Chirac left the event as he visited on the same day.

In 2006, a poor-quality rough cut of the film was leaked on the Internet containing alternate dialogue and music, deleted scenes, and a different ending. Some of the deleted scenes, such as Stern being escorted out of the WNBC building, appeared in the film's original trailer and publicity materials before they were cut.

=== Reception ===
Private Parts received mostly positive reviews from critics.

In a review for the Chicago Tribune, critic Gene Siskel gave the film three and a half out of four. He pointed out the "predictable" scenes of "lesbian jokes and toilet humor", but the "wonderful love story" between Stern and Alison is the most surprising aspect and preferred Stern's character off the air to the one on the radio. Siskel concluded his review by singling out the scenes of Stern courting Alison, his eagerness to have a baby, and his apology to Alison as "signature moments" of the film.

Roger Ebert reviewed the film for the Chicago Sun-Times, giving it three out of four stars. He said that the film has enough to satisfy the diehard Stern fans and appeal to the general audience at the same time, and he praised Stern and Quivers for playing "convincing, engaging versions of themselves" in their feature film debut, something he claims even "seasoned actors" claim is difficult. Ebert noted Thomas's directing skills made the film play out like a film and not a series of filmed radio broadcasts.

Todd McCarthy of Variety gave a positive review, calling the film "a lean, crisp and very entertaining picture".

On Rotten Tomatoes, the film has a 74% rating, based on 53 reviews, with an average rating of 6.3/10. The site's critical consensus reads: "A surprisingly endearing biopic about the controversial shock-jock Howard Stern that is equally funny and raunchy." Metacritic reports a score of 67 out of 100, based on 19 critics.

=== Accolades ===
For his performance, Stern won the Blockbuster Entertainment Award for "Favorite Male Newcomer". The awards are given by the result of write-in votes from fans and Stern won by a wide margin. Stern was nominated for a Golden Satellite Award for "Best Performance by an Actor in a Motion Picture – Comedy". He was also nominated for a Golden Raspberry Award for "Worst New Star".

For her directing work, Thomas won the audience award at Karlovy Vary International Film Festival (1997). She was also nominated for Crystal Globe in Karlovy Vary which went, at the end, to Ma Vie en Rose by Alain Berliner.

American Film Institute recognition:

- AFI's 100 Years ... 100 Laughs – Nominated

=== Television broadcasts ===
In April 1997, the USA Network agreed to pay $7 million for the rights to air the film for nine years, from 1999. The editing featured on-air explanations from Stern for the pixelization and bleep censors required to air the R-rated film. Stern appeared in new taped segments in which he occasionally pauses the film to comment on it. USA premiered the film even though no alternate scenes had been filmed to replace the nudity nor had any alternate dialogue been recorded to replace the profanity for television broadcasts. The nudity was simply pixelized and the profanity bleeped. In 2007, VH-1 began airing this version.

The film premiered in 1080 High Definition on Universal HD on March 11, 2008.

=== Home media ===
When the film was released on video, some store customers objected to the original cover featuring Stern with no clothes on. An alternative version of the cover was produced featuring Stern fully clothed.
