= Jackie Hayes =

Jackie Hayes may refer to:

- Jackie Hayes (second baseman) (1906–1983), baseball player from 1927 through 1940
- Jackie Hayes (catcher) (1861–1905), baseball player from 1882 through 1890
- Jackie E. Hayes (born 1961), member of the South Carolina House of Representatives
- Jackie Hayes, stage name of actor and artist Roberto Gari

== See also ==
- John Hayes (disambiguation)
