= John Hayes (radio) =

American radio executive

John Hayes is an American radio executive, famously named "The Incubus" by Howard Stern from his days as vice president and general manager at WNBC. He and Kevin "Pig Virus" Metheny, program director prior to Hayes' arrival, were portrayed by Paul Giamatti as a composite character under the name Kenny "Pig Vomit" Rushton in the 1997 movie Private Parts.

Hayes claimed he fired Stern from WNBC-AM in 1985 on the orders of NBC network executives, though Howard later said it was Randy Bongarten who gave him the news. Hayes again took Stern off the air from CILQ-FM in Toronto in 2002. Until 2008 Hayes was the president of the Radio Division for Canadian broadcasting outfit Corus Entertainment Inc.
