= Lord John Hay =

Lord John Hay may refer to:

- John Hay, 1st Lord Hay of Yester (1450–1508), a Scottish nobleman
- Lord John Hay (Scottish Army officer) (c. 1668–1706), a Scottish general
- Lord John Hay (Royal Navy officer, born 1793) (1793–1851), a rear admiral and Whig politician
- Lord John Hay (Royal Navy officer, born 1827) (1827–1916), Admiral of the Fleet and Liberal politician, nephew of the above

== See also ==
- John Hay (disambiguation)
