= John Hays =

John Hays may refer to:

- John Hays (businessman) (1949–2020), British businessman, founder of Hays Travel
- John Hays (sheriff) (1770 – after 1822), first known Jewish resident of Illinois, Sheriff of St. Clair County, Illinois; Indian agent
- John Coffee Hays (1817–1883), or "Jack" Hays, Texas Ranger, U.S. Army officer, first mayor of Oakland, California
- John H. Hays (1844–1904), American Civil War recipient of the Medal of Honor

== See also ==
- John Hayes (disambiguation)
- John Hay (disambiguation)
- Jack Hays (Christopher John Hays, 1918-1983), English footballer
