= The Howard Stern Show (TV program) =

American variety television show

- Created by: Howard Stern
- Presented by: Howard Stern; Robin Quivers
- Opening theme: "Midnight Love" by Fifth Angel
- Country of origin: United States
- Original language: English
- No. of seasons: 3
- No. of episodes: 69

Production
- Executive producers: Dan Forman; Robert Woodruff
- Producers: Kevin McMahon; Gary Dell'Abate; David Sittenfeld
- Running time: 60 minutes (with commercials)
- Production company: All American Television

Original release
- Network: WWOR-TV
- Release: July 14, 1990 – August 1, 1992

Related
- Howard Stern (E! network; 1994–2005); Howard TV (In Demand; 2006–2013)

The Howard Stern Show is an American late night variety television show hosted by radio personality Howard Stern and starred members of his radio show staff, namely Robin Quivers, Fred Norris, Gary Dell'Abate, Jackie Martling, and John Melendez. It aired weekly on Saturday nights from July 14, 1990, to August 1, 1992, from WWOR-TV in Secaucus, New Jersey, and was nationally syndicated by All American Television from 1991. It is informally known as "The Channel 9 Show".

== History ==
=== Background ===
By 1990, Stern had been the host of his morning radio show on WXRK in New York City for almost four years, and was also simulcast on stations in Philadelphia and Washington, D.C. He had filmed a series of pilots for Fox in 1987 as a potential replacement for The Late Show Starring Joan Rivers, but the network deemed the pilots boring and decided against picking it up. Stern went on to reach success in the pay-per-view and home video markets with his Negligee and Underpants Party and U.S. Open Sores specials in 1988 and 1989, respectively.

On April 24, 1990, Secaucus, New Jersey–based television station WWOR-TV announced its deal with Stern to produce a new Saturday night show on its station, beginning with four "specials" broadcast in the summer followed by a full-time weekly production schedule and national syndication. Bob Woodruff, then WWOR's vice president of program development, approached Stern in 1989 after he had watched him on Late Show with David Letterman and listened to the radio show and thought its "best elements" would translate well on-screen. Woodruff was keen on Stern in order to "beat the boredom of summer reruns" that WWOR-TV aired, and that his "provocative commentary should make funny television." He envisaged Stern's show to be a cross between the satirical comedy show That Was the Week That Was and the sketch comedy series Rowan & Martin's Laugh-In. Despite the need to be a "responsible broadcaster", Woodruff said that he did not want to "water [Stern] down".

Stern promoted the show with a press conference at WWOR-TV on July 2 and appearances on various talk shows. The show generated controversy before it started to air, when WWOR-TV received calls from several people asking which sponsors had bought advertising time on the program, so they could write letters of protest to the companies. The station's publicity manager noted that the attention generated from the protests had the potential to in fact boost the program's ratings, and Woodruff said the criticisms against Stern and the television show were unfair as it had yet to air. In addition, Stern was not allowed to mention the television show, or say when or where it aired, because WWOR-TV and WXRK owner Infinity Broadcasting could not reach a cross-promotional deal, leaving Stern to refer to the television show as "Project X".

=== Production ===
Stern's deal with WWOR-TV included a $100,000 budget that covered all production costs and salaries. The first of the initial four episodes aired on July 14, 1990, as The Howard Stern Summer Show. Episodes included live adverts as featured on Stern's radio show. After the second episode had aired, management at WWOR-TV announced that they had made a "unanimous decision" to sign the program on for an additional nine weeks, despite ratings for the second episode decreasing by 11%. In October 1990, WWOR announced that it had renewed the show for another thirteen episodes, and that the program had been extended from 60 to 90 minutes from October 13. On January 10, 1991, the program entered national syndication by All American Television, with alternate content replacing the live commercial reads which aired on WWOR and were targeted to the New York City market exclusively. However, the WWOR feed of the program (including the aforementioned live commercials targeting New York) was still carried nationwide via cable by WWOR's superstation feed, and no stations which aired the show in syndication are known to have exercised syndication exclusivity against WWOR's superstation feed airing the show locally in their market via cable.

On July 15, 1992, WWOR-TV announced that the show had been canceled. Despite media speculation that the decision was over content, the station clarified that it was a business decision as the costs to produce the show "exceeded the revenues even at its highest ratings". The station added that it became increasingly difficult to have the show syndicated to other stations across the country. During a press conference held on his radio show on July 28, Stern maintained that it was his decision to end the program, which was prompted by the station's refusal to provide the budget or resources to improve the show's production quality. He also claimed that WWOR's claim that they could not make enough money from the show was "an absolute lie", and that the network contacted him daily in an attempt to change his mind and continue. The final new episode aired on August 1, after which WWOR-TV aired repeats. A total of 69 episodes were broadcast to as many as 65 markets across the country.

=== Ratings and reception ===
By the end of July 1990, the show had increased WWOR's ratings in the 11 p.m. to midnight hour by more than 100%. In the New York market, The Howard Stern Show often doubled the ratings share of Saturday Night Live on NBC during the half-hour the two programs overlapped. In Los Angeles on KCOP, the show managed to attract a 34.4% market share at 12:30 a.m. in the male 18-49 demographic.

The WWOR show featured outrageous segments including "Guess Who's the Jew" and "Lesbian Dating Game". A critic of the Los Angeles Times described the show as "at once incredibly funny and incredibly vile".

== Lawsuits ==
In May 1991, Stern was the subject of a $500 million lawsuit against him by Mark Glickman, the husband of a woman who was seen giving Stern a massage on the show. Glickman claimed he was ridiculed by people "snickering at me, pointing at me and laughing at me", but Stern's lawyer commented that Glickman had more reason to be upset at his wife than Stern. The case was dismissed in October, and an appeals court later affirmed the decision.

In 1992, Lori Gedon, owner of a New Jersey-based real estate agency, filed a lawsuit against Stern and WWOR-TV after she inadvertently received over one thousand phone calls after a phone number used in a 1991 sketch about Jack Kevorkian matched the number of her business. The skit involved an actor portraying Kevorkian encouraging viewers to call the number for advice on suicide. Gedon sought $60,000 in lost business and telephone bills, plus punitive damages.

== See also ==
- The Howard Stern Show (radio program, since 1979)
- Howard Stern television shows

== Bibliography ==
- Colford, Paul (1997). Howard Stern: King of All Media (2nd ed.). St. Martin's Press. ISBN 978-0-312-96221-0.
- Menell, Jeff (1993). Howard Stern: Big Mouth. Windsor. ISBN 978-1-558-17796-3.
- Luerssen, John (2009). American Icon: The Howard Stern Reader. Lulu. ISBN 978-0-557-04204-3.
