= Howard Stern television shows =

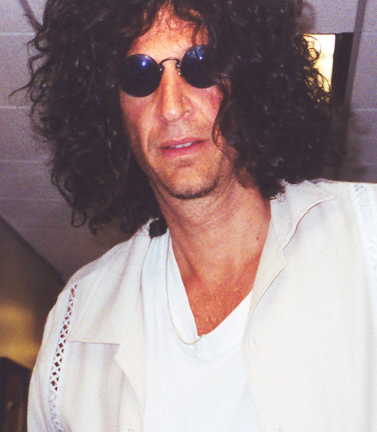
Stern in 2000

Howard Stern is an American radio personality who is best known for his radio show The Howard Stern Show. Stern (along with his followers) describes himself as the "King of All Media" for his successes in the radio, television, film, music and publishing industries.

== The Howard Stern Show (Fox) ==
Opening title for Stern's Fox pilot.

On April 16, 1987, a meeting was held between Stern and management of WNYW, the flagship television station of the fledgling Fox network. The network was considering Stern as a replacement to The Late Show hosted by Joan Rivers in its 11:00 PM hour. Five one-hour pilots titled The Howard Stern Show were recorded at a cost of about $400,000. They featured rock guitarist Leslie West of Mountain as bandleader and Steve Rossi as announcer and singer. By early June, air dates were yet to be scheduled; the pilots were instead being tested among focus groups in California. With no formal announcement, the network cancelled the series in July. Paul Noble, the former executive producer for WNYW, was never told of Fox's decision. "By today's standards, they were absolutely tame." He also said, "They were not the kind of thing that a local New York television station was prepared to get involved with at that time. It was more like off-the-wall radio."

== The Howard Stern "Interview" ==

The Howard Stern "Interview" was a late-night talk show that ran for 35 episodes on the cable TV channel E! Entertainment Television from November 27, 1992. The show featured Stern hosting a half-hour, one-on-one interview with a celebrity guest without an audience, and were known for being intimate and personal with questions that celebrities were not normally asked. Stern said the show was "not phony" and presented an alternative to the "same dull format" of other talk programs.

Stern announced the show at a press conference at the Plaza Hotel in New York City on October 21, 1992. He agreed to do it in order to focus on his interviewing skills, and to prove to the "network morons" that he could do a show that "wasn't 'dirty'" and still get strong ratings. Several hours after the announcement, the Los Angeles chapter of the National Organization for Women issued a statement criticizing E! for hiring Stern and suggested a possible boycott of the network and its advertisers. Fran Shea, then vice president of programming at E!, noted the group had attacked the show despite knowing nothing about its content. On November 19, E! announced that 16 guests had already been booked for the show, despite claims from agents and managers that the network was struggling to secure willing participants. As Stern's radio show was subject to fines issued by the FCC for indecent material, the network maintained it had "full editorial control" over the program. In October 1993, E! had attempted to develop the program by filming several test shows with a studio audience. It also considered bringing in guests unfamiliar with the radio show and widening the topics for discussion. A month later, after 35 episodes had been produced, Stern's contract with E! expired.

The first batch of episodes were filmed in New York City and Los Angeles in November 1992. The first episode featured Garry Shandling. Other guests included Jason Priestley, Joan Rivers, James Brown, Sandra Bernhard, Richard Marx, Grace Slick, Dick Cavett, Donald Trump, Andrew Dice Clay, Janis Ian, Zsa Zsa Gabor, Boy George, Phil Hartman, Milton Berle, Suzanne Vega, Geraldo Rivera, Jon Bon Jovi, Tom Jones, Willie Nelson, Flavor Flav, Frank Zappa, Chuck Norris, Richard Lewis, and Ronnie Wood.

Los Angeles Times critic Howard Rosenberg praised the show, saying it "yielded more information than what's available from traditional talk shows. There may not be a better half-hour on television." In January 1993, Stern said his interview with Cavett was his biggest challenge because he considered Cavett "so frigging boring", but felt he succeeded in making him interesting. Stern had difficulty in understanding Brown's "jive talk", so he brought in a black interpreter on the show. Stern later said that the show lacked the energy and "magic" because he had already interviewed most of the guests on the radio.

== Howard Stern ==
Opening title

Howard Stern (also known as Howard Stern On the Air) was a nightly television show that ran from June 1994 to July 2005 on the basic cable channel E! Entertainment Television. It featured half-hour highlights and behind the scenes footage from Stern's radio show, broadcast Monday through Friday.

E! announced its deal with Stern on May 31, 1994, and secured an initial 2-year exclusive agreement plus the rights to a third year of reruns. Stern said the show was ideal in that it allowed the radio program to be broadcast nationwide, and that the cross-platform setup had "tremendous potential". The show involved the filming of the entire radio program using six robotic cameras placed in the WXRK-FM studio, which at the time was located at 600 Madison Avenue, highlights from which were assembled for television broadcast. Two sneak preview episodes were broadcast on June 18, before the show officially began on June 20. The television shows broadcast on January 21, 1999, and February 5, 2004, marked the 1,000th and 2,000th episodes, respectively.

On October 6, 2004, Stern announced that he had signed a five-year contract with Sirius XM Radio, a subscription-based satellite radio service, that began from January 2006. The move allowed Stern to broadcast without the content restrictions imposed by the Federal Communications Commission (FCC) that he faced while broadcasting on terrestrial radio. As a result, the E! show came to an end as Stern announced on August 3, 2005, that he made a deal with iN DEMAND Networks, a Video on Demand digital cable service, to create Howard Stern on Demand. The new, uncensored channel allowed the filming of the radio show at Sirius XM in high-definition. The radio show broadcast on July 1, 2005, was the last to be filmed for a "new episode" for airing the following week on July 8. The hour-long special featured members of the E! show staff saying their farewells (although some of the crew continued working for the show at Sirius XM) and telling their favorite show moments. The show was a consistent performer in the network's ratings.

== The Howard Stern Radio Show ==
Opening title

The Howard Stern Radio Show is an American late-night television series that ran on Saturday nights in syndication (mostly on CBS-affiliated stations) from August 22, 1998, to May 19, 2001. Although the show was syndicated it was largely sold to CBS affiliates, with only a handful of other stations airing it; it was in fact syndicated by CBS' in-house distribution firm of the time, Eyemark Entertainment, which was previously Group W Productions prior to the CBS-Westinghouse merger of 1995; after 2000, Eyemark was merged into the newly acquired by CBS King World. Most of CBS' stations, including those in rural areas, did not pick up the show. It ran for a total of three seasons including 84 episodes. The show featured taped highlights of The Howard Stern Show, in a similar format seen in Howard Stern, the half-hour show that was broadcast on E! from 1994 to 2005. The Howard Stern Radio Show also included new segments such as animations of song parodies and exclusive behind the scenes footage.

The show was intended to compete with Saturday Night Live on NBC.

== Howard Stern on Demand/Howard TV & SiriusXM Video ==
In November 2005, Howard Stern on Demand was launched (relaunched as Howard TV in May 2006) as an on-demand pay television service, to coincide with the beginning of his 5-year contract with Sirius XM Radio in 2006 and his new 5-year contract in 2011. It covered the daily happenings of Stern's radio show, as well as airing old WXRK segments, some of which previously aired on E!.

Howard TV was owned and operated by In Demand. There were no content restrictions applied to Howard TV as a pay-per-view service.

On September 16, 2013, Stern and In Demand announced that the Howard TV contract would not be renewed, and the service would end in December.

=== Howard 360 Announcement & SiriusXM Video ===
Following the cancelation of Howard TV in 2013, speculation of Stern's future in television began to arise, including his own online streaming service, a return to cable, the creation of an exclusive cable network, and partnering with an already-existing online streaming service. Stern announced in February 2015 that he ended up partnering with Whalerock Industries to develop an Internet hub for Stern-related content tentatively called “Howard 360” which was planned as a video streaming service.

On December 15, 2015, Stern announced a new multi-year agreement with SiriusXM that included long-term rights to his audio and video archives and plans for a new streaming video venture. The SiriusXM agreement significantly changed the circumstances surrounding the Whalerock project, and the originally envisioned standalone “Howard 360” service was never realized.

SiriusXM ultimately retained the rights to Stern’s video content and made video from the show available through its website and app for its subscribers, as well as through The Howard Stern Show's YouTube channel.

== HBO Special & The Howard Stern Show (HBO Max) ==
In 2022, the video footage of Stern’s interview with Bruce Springsteen was released on HBO as The Howard Stern Interview: Bruce Springsteen.

In August 2026, it was announced that HBO Max and SiriusXM struck a major deal to adapt his live radio show into filmed streamable episodes on HBO Max, alongside extras. The Howard Stern Show on HBO Max premiered on September 17, 2026, with new episodes releasing every Thursday.

== Bibliography ==
- Colford, Paul (1997). Howard Stern: King of All Media (2nd ed.). St. Martin's Press. ISBN 978-0-312-96221-0.
- Luerssen, John (2009). American Icon: The Howard Stern Reader. Lulu. ISBN 978-0-557-04204-3.
