= John Hay (footballer) =

Scottish footballer

Personal information
- Place of birth: Renfrew, Scotland
- Height: 5 ft 10 1/2 in (1.79 m)
- Position: Right back

Senior career*
| Years | Team | Apps | (Gls) |
- Bathgate
| 1921–1922 | Bradford City | 3 | (0) |
- St Bernard's
- * Club domestic league appearances and goals

John Hay was a Scottish professional footballer who played as a right back.

== Career ==
Born in Renfrew, Hay played for Bathgate, Bradford City and St Bernard's.

For Bradford City he made 3 appearances in the Football League.

== Sources ==
- Frost, Terry (1988). Bradford City A Complete Record 1903-1988. Breedon Books Sport. ISBN 0-907969-38-0.
