= Johnny Hayes (radio DJ) =

American radio personality and DJ

Johnny Hayes (born March 10, 1939, or 1940) is an American radio personality and former DJ who worked at Los Angeles radio station KRLA. He began working as a disc jockey in 1961 with stints at major radio stations around the country including Atlanta, San Francisco, and San Diego.

== Early years ==
A native of Macon, Georgia, he served in the Air Force after graduating from high school. To forge a career in radio, he determined to lose his Southern accent and eventually succeeded in doing so.

== Career ==
He has been a disc jockey at major radio stations around the country since 1961, when he joined WAKE in Atlanta. Later gigs in San Francisco and San Diego led to him being hired in 1965 to Los Angeles #1 Top-40 station, KRLA, where he shared the mic with Casey Kasem, Dave Hull, Bob Eubanks, and Dick Biondi. He hosted the Big 11 Countdown Show, where he counted the top 11 songs from the Southern California charts, plus a few extras, and told stories behind the hits as well as the artists who performed the songs. He also shared the events that took place on that particular date. Towards the end of the show, he asked a trivia question for prizes, in which the first contestant, who called with the correct answer, would be guaranteed the prize. After a falling out with the KRLA Management in 1991, Hays left the station and became a disc jockey for KRTH101FM for several years. However, due to conflicts of interest policies, Hayes was not allowed to have a countdown show on that station. He retired in the 2000s.

Hayes was awarded a star on the Hollywood Walk of Fame on May 18, 2000.
