= North Shore Animal League America =

Animal rescue organization in New York, US

Coordinates: 40.82623°N 73.68317°W

North Shore Animal League America, headquartered in Port Washington, New York (on the North Shore of Long Island), is the largest no-kill animal rescue and adoption organization in the world.

== History ==
Marianne H. Sanders founded the League in 1944, with the mission to save the lives of pets through adoption, rescue, spay/neuter and advocacy initiatives. Each year, the League rescues, nurtures and adopts nearly 20,000 pets nationwide, and to date, has placed nearly one million puppies, kittens, cats and dogs into screened homes. One of the first animal rescue agencies on the ground in the aftermath of Hurricanes Katrina and Rita, the League rescued more than 1,400 pets from the region.

Every year, the medical center takes care of more than 10,000 outpatient visits, administers more than 15,000 vaccinations and performs over 11,000 free spay/neuter procedures for adopted pets, preventing over 132 million unwanted litters. The League's SPAY/USA program is a nationwide referral service for affordable spay/neuter services. The League is also home to a National Shelter Rescue and Humane Education Team. The League has a mobile adoption program, adoption counseling, training and foster care for pets with special needs.

In 2005, a documentary series titled Animal House: A Dog's Life on Animal Planet aired 13 episodes about dogs and workers at the League.

In 2019, the facility expanded with a second floor space to allow cats to roam free.
