= John E. Hayes =

American Food Scientist

Academic background
- Education: BS, Food Science, 1998, Cornell University; MS, Food Science, 2000, Cornell University; PhD, Nutritional Sciences, 2007, University of Connecticut, Fellowship, Alcohol Addiction / Genetics 2009, Brown University
- Thesis: Translating taste genetics to adiposity: sensation, preference and intake of high-fat sweet foods. (2007)
- Doctoral advisor: Valerie Duffy
- Other advisor: Harry Lawless

John Edward Hayes is an American Food Scientist who specializes in Sensory & Consumer Science and Eating Behavior. He is a full professor of food science at Pennsylvania State University and director of their Sensory Evaluation Center. He has received multiple international awards for his work, and is best known for his research on chemesthesis, genetic variation in taste, and COVID-19 anosmia. Hayes is among the top 500 (<1%) most cited Food Scientists in the world.

== Early life and education ==
Hayes completed his Bachelor of Science and Master of Science degree at Cornell University before enrolling at the University of Connecticut for his PhD in Nutritional Sciences. Following his PhD, Hayes accepted an National Institutes of Health T32 fellowship in behavioral genetics and alcohol addiction at the Brown University Center for Alcohol and Addiction Studies.

== Career ==
In 2009, Hayes was hired at Pennsylvania State University as their first tenure-track faculty member in Sensory & Consumer Science, and he became director of their Sensory Evaluation Center. While directing the center, Hayes led various studies which focused on using psychophysics to study chemosensation, genetics, food choice and the optimization of oral and nonoral drug delivery systems. One of his studies that focused on alcoholism confirmed that bitter receptor gene variants were associated with alcohol intake. He also suggested that chemosensory variation played little to no role in predicting alcohol intake once an individual was dependent.

During the COVID-19 pandemic, Hayes collaborated with colleague Alyssa Bakke to conduct a global survey in an attempt to quantify the prevalence of loss of sensory function related to the virus. Later, Hayes and Bakke launched the "Stop. Smell. Be Well." public health awareness campaign to encourage people to perform a daily smell test. As a result of this research, Hayes also collaborated with Cara Exten, an assistant nursing professor, to improve contact tracing and screening efforts. This eventually led to the distribution of coronavirus scent cards across Penn State's campus with QR codes to check and confirm smell loss.

== Leadership and Service ==
Hayes is a section editor for journal Physiology & Behavior. He was a founding members of leadership team of the Global Consortium for Chemosensory Research, which was founded in March 2020 to research earlier reports of chemosensory loss due to COVID-19., before stepping down in 2022. He is past chair of the Pangborn Sensory Science Symposium, and current president of the Pangborn Sensory Science Trust, a 501c3 non-profit dedicated to the advancement of sensory and consumer science. In July 2024, Hayes was named to the scientific advisory board for the National Smell and Taste Center at the National Institutes of Health. Hayes is also engaged in public service independently from his academic career. In May 2024, he was appointed to fill a vacancy on the council for the Borough of State College

== Awards ==
He received the Pangborn Sensory Science Scholarship as a Doctoral Student at University of Connecticut. Subsequently, he received the Ajinomoto Award for Taste Research, and Barry Jacobs Award for Human Psychophysics, each from the Association for Chemoreception Sciences. In 2015, he also received the Food Quality & Preference Researcher of the Future Award at the Pangborn Sensory Science Symposium in Sweden. In 2021, Hayes was selected to receive the Institute of Food Technologists' Sensory and Consumer Sciences Achievement Award.
