= WHIRL Magazine =

- September 2012 cover
- Categories: Food, Fashion, and Culture
- Frequency: monthly
- Circulation: 30,000
- Publisher: WHIRL Publishing
- First issue: October 2001
- Final issue: January 2019
- Country: USA
- Language: English
- Website: https://www.whirlmagazine.com/

WHIRL Magazine is a lifestyle and sports magazine published in Pittsburgh, in the U.S. state of Pennsylvania.

Cover stars included Beth Ostrosky Stern, Christina Aguilera, Taylor Swift and President of the United States, Barack Obama.

== Edible Allegheny ==
Edible Allegheny is a bi-monthly publication. It promotes western Pennsylvania's food movement, its distinct culinary styles, and its huge community of growers, producers, chefs, and food artisans.
