= John Hayes (footballer, born 1903) =

Australian rules footballer, born 1903

Personal information
- Full name: John Nicholas Hayes
- Born: 5 April 1903; Sebastopol, Victoria
- Died: 16 September 1977 (aged 74); Echuca, Victoria
- Height: 178 cm (5 ft 10 in)
- Weight: 73 kg (161 lb)

Playing career^{1}
Years	Club	Games (Goals)
1927	Fitzroy	1 (0)
- ^{1} Playing statistics correct to the end of 1927.

John Nicholas Hayes (5 April 1903 – 16 September 1977) was an Australian rules footballer who played with Fitzroy in the Victorian Football League (VFL).
