= Miss America (book) =

1995 book by Howard Stern

- Author: Howard Stern
- Cover artist: Jack Heller (Design); Oscar Gonzalez (Design); Paul Aresu (Photo)
- Language: English
- Subject: Autobiography
- Publisher: ReganBooks
- Publication date: November 7, 1995
- Publication place: United States
- Media type: Hardcover (1995); Paperback (1996)
- Pages: 482 (Hardcover); 592 (Paperback)
- ISBN: 0-06-039167-7
- Preceded by: Private Parts
- Followed by: Howard Stern Comes Again

Miss America is the second book by American radio personality Howard Stern. It was released on November 7, 1995, by ReganBooks and written in collaboration with Larry "Ratso" Sloman and edited by Judith Regan. In August 1995, Stern announced his deal with ReganBooks to write a follow-up to his first Private Parts (1993), which had become a nationwide commercial success. Stern wrote the book in the summer of 1995, and covers a variety of topics such as his experiences with obsessive-compulsive disorder, on-air rivalries with other radio personalities, and a private meeting with Michael Jackson in an attempt to revive the singer's career.

As with its predecessor, Miss America was an instant commercial success. It set a new record with 33,000 copies sold on its opening day. By the end of 1995 over 1.39 million copies were sold, and the book became the fastest-selling title for ReganBooks. In October 1996, a paperback edition was released in three different covers with Stern sporting different coloured wigs, plus additional colour photographs.

== Background and writing ==
In 1995, Stern made an advance deal worth around $3 million with ReganBooks, an imprint of HarperCollins, to publish a follow-up to his first book Private Parts (1993). Judith Regan was assigned as the book's editor, which she had also done for Private Parts. Stern wrote the book in two months over the summer of 1995, often working on it for seven or eight hours at home having done his radio show in the morning. He collaborated with Larry "Ratso" Sloman, who had also edited Private Parts. Stern aimed not to write a book "more outrageous" than Private Parts, but concentrated on stories and topics that he had either not told on the air or had avoided. The book was structured without a set beginning, middle, and end, rather to allow the reader to open it at any chapter. Regan said that Stern had performed beyond what was expected of him, writing 40,000 words for the book. "I said, 'Howard. Stop writing.'" When the book was finished, Stern felt a bigger sense of gratification with it compared to his radio show and when Regan praised him for what he had written, he described it as "the most fulfilling moment in my career so far".

Stern named the book after a remark from his father. He explained: "When I was a kid growing up in high school, I would come down the steps. My parents were disgusted by me. I had started this growth spurt. I looked like a big, hairy pencil. I'm walking down the steps and my father would look at me and I'd be in my underpants. And he looked down at his son who was sprouting with facial hair and he'd go, 'Oh, look. There's Miss America.' The title caused a rift with those in charge of the Miss America beauty pageant who, in a letter to HarperCollins, argued that the book contained "tasteless" photographs "that deal with subject matter having nothing to do with our client". Regan maintained she acted with caution with the title and thought it was safe to use. An early working title was Sloppy Seconds in reference to a gang bang, but Regan rejected it because she deemed it "gross" and a put down on himself. Other rejected titles included Mein Kampf, the same title as Adolf Hitler's book, and Big Nose, Small Hose.

Stern announced the book on his radio show on August 28, 1995. He revealed that he had completed a draft version of the entire book at that point, with two chapters finalised, though Regan maintained he had exaggerated how little he had produced for her. A title had yet to be settled upon. Stern had written a chapter about the Simpson case but felt it would date the book, and found himself editing what he had written as the case had yet to reach a verdict while he was writing it. He then decided to scrap the chapter. Stern dedicates the book to his radio show intern Steve Grillo. His other choice was Lonnie Hanover, the owner of Scores, a strip club which Stern and his staff used to visit.

== Design ==
The front cover depicts Stern dressed in drag. The back cover features a picture of Stern with O. J. Simpson at Donald Trump's wedding in 1993. The phrase "Getting away with murder" is printed in large white letters, referring to Simpson's murder case in which he was acquitted on two counts of murder. Regan rejected two photographs and illustrations that Stern had chosen to include in the book. One depicted Simpson showing Stern how to slash and dismember his wife; another showed Stern holding a hatchet and his wife's severed leg while Simpson coaches him. In a letter to Stern's agent Don Buchwald, Regan said they were "beyond tasteless" and "entirely inappropriate". One that Regan accepted depicted Stern's wife, covered in blood with her eyes rolled up and her neck slashed, being fed through a meat grinder operated by him while Simpson stands by giving the thumbs up. Regan said that Simpson was "not happy" with the back cover. Following the book's release Stern commented on the reaction to the picture: "That's the kind of thing that my wife and I felt strongly about-O. J. should be in jail. She was totally comfortable with it, although she looks at it and thinks it's much worse now." In 1996, Stern came in at number one on Mr. Blackwell's annual list of worst dressed women.

== Release ==
Miss America was released on November 7, 1995, a week earlier than the original release date. It was further promoted with an hour-long television special on the E! network in December 1995. The book was an instant commercial success, with six printings of the book sold out in the first 12 hours of release. The Barnes & Noble store on Fifth Avenue in New York City opened at 6:30 a.m. on the day of release, for which 250 people were already in line to buy it. The chain sold 33,000 copies at its stores nationwide by the end of the first day, setting a new first day record. In Los Angeles, 500 copies were sold by 9 a.m. on the first day. Miss America went on to set a new record for the fastest selling book in one day, beating Sex by Madonna in 1992. Stern's appearance on The Tonight Show with Jay Leno to promote the book drew controversy after antics by two bikini-clad women that accompanied him, including a kiss, was edited from the broadcast.

Miss America entered the non-fiction section of The New York Times Best Seller list at number one for the week of November 26, 1995, knocking off My American Journey by Colin Powell. It stayed at number one for three weeks, and remained on the list for a total of 19 weeks. The book sold more than nine copies for every one copy of the next best-selling book on the list. By the end of 1995, 1,398,880 copies of the book were sold, making it the third best-seller of the year. Miss America was the best-selling paperback on Amazon in 1998.

Stern held book signings at several cities nationwide which attracted large crowds. The first, in New York City, saw him wear a gown and wig similar to the one on the book's cover. The signing in Los Angeles was attended by an estimated 15,000 people. The signing at Tower Books in Philadelphia saw the store close for all other business except the signing in order to manage the crowds. The store housed 5,000 copies of the book sold at a 30% discount that Stern was prepared to sign, which worked out to be one signature and a personal message every five seconds. Chubby Checker attended the signing.

A paperback edition of Miss America was released on October 17, 1996. Three different versions were produced, each featuring a different front photograph of Stern dressed in drag with blonde, brunette, and red hair, but the book's designers could not decide which one to release, so they decided to publish all three versions. Stern insisted on wearing a sleeveless dress to reveal some armpit hair.

== Publication ==
- Stern, Howard; Larry Sloman (1995). Judith Regan (ed.). Miss America (1st ed.). Regan Books. ISBN 978-0-06-039167-6.
- Stern, Howard; Larry Sloman (September 1996). Judith Regan (ed.). Miss America (Shrink Wrapped Book (Paperback) ed.). Regan Books. ISBN 978-0-06-101234-1.
- Stern, Howard; Larry Sloman (16 October 1996). Judith Regan (ed.). Miss America (Mass Market Paperback ed.). Regan Books. ISBN 978-0-06-109550-4.
