= General Hay =

General Hay may refer to:

- Alexander Leith Hay (1758–1838), British Army general
- Andrew Hay (British Army officer) (1762–1814), British Army major general
- Bob Hay (general) (1920–1998), Australian Army major general
- Charles Craufurd Hay (1809–1873), British Army lieutenant general
- James Hay (British Army officer) (died 1854), British Army lieutenant general
- John H. Hay (1917–1995), U.S. Army lieutenant general
- Lord John Hay (Scottish Army officer) (c. 1668–1706), British Army brigadier general
- Lord Charles Hay (c. 1700–1760), British Army major general
- William H. Hay (1860–1946), U.S. Army major general
- Charles Hay, 20th Earl of Erroll (1852–1927), British Army major general
- George Hay, 8th Marquess of Tweeddale (1787–1876), British Army general

== See also ==
- General Hays (disambiguation)
- General Hayes (disambiguation)
