= Charles Hay =

Charles Hay may refer to:

- Charles Hay, 3rd Marquess of Tweeddale (1670–1715), Scottish nobleman
- Charles Hay, 13th Earl of Erroll (1677–1717), Scottish peer
- Lord Charles Hay (c. 1700–1760), British Army general and politician
- Charles Craufurd Hay (1809–1873), British Army officer
- Charles Hay (politician) (1843–1924), Scottish-born politician in Manitoba, Canada
- Charles Hay, 20th Earl of Erroll (1852–1927), Scottish soldier and Conservative politician
- Charles Hay (ice hockey) (1902–1973), Canadian ice hockey player, organizer, and administrator
- Charles Hay, 16th Earl of Kinnoull (born 1962), Scottish earl
- Charles Hay (diplomat), British diplomat

== See also ==
- Charles Hays (disambiguation)
- Charles Hayes (disambiguation)
