= Charles Hayes =

Charles, Charlie, Charley, or Chuck Hayes may refer to:

== Arts and entertainment ==
- Charles G. Hayes (1937–2014), American musician
- Charles Geoffrey Hayes (1942–2018), English television presenter and actor
- Charlie Hayes (actress) (born 1977), British actress
- Walker Hayes (Charles Edgar Walker Hayes, born 1979), American singer

== Sports ==
- Charley Hayes (fl. 1938–1940), American baseball player
- Charlie Hayes (born 1965), American baseball player
- Chuck Hayes (born 1983), American basketball player

== Others ==
- Charles Hayes (mathematician) (1678–1760), English mathematician
- Charles R. Hayes (1899–1968), justice of the South Dakota Supreme Court
- Charles H. Hayes (1906–1995), assistant commandant of the Marine Corps
- Charles Hayes (politician) (1918–1997), U.S. representative from Illinois

== See also ==
- Charles Hays (disambiguation)
- Charles Hay (disambiguation)
