= John Hay, 4th Marquess of Tweeddale =

Scottish nobleman

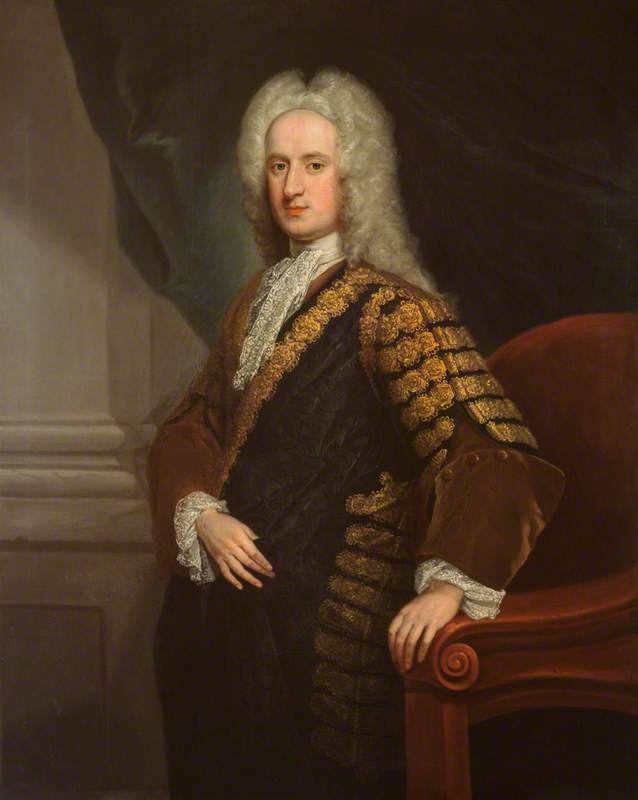
John Hay, 4th Marquess of Tweeddale

John Hay, 4th Marquess of Tweeddale, PC (1695 – 9 December 1762) was a Scottish nobleman.

== Early life ==
He was the eldest son of Charles Hay, 3rd Marquess of Tweeddale and the former Lady Susan Hamilton, the widow of John Cochrane, 2nd Earl of Dundonald, the second daughter of William Douglas-Hamilton, Duke of Hamilton, and Anne Hamilton, suo jure Duchess of Hamilton (eldest daughter and co-heiress of James Hamilton, 1st Duke of Hamilton).

His paternal grandparents were John Hay, 2nd Marquess of Tweeddale and the former Lady Mary Maitland (a daughter of John Maitland, 1st Duke of Lauderdale and the former Anne Home). His uncle, Lord John Hay, commanded the famous regiment of dragoons, afterwards called the Scots Greys, at the Battle of Ramillies. His paternal aunts were Lady Anne Hay (the third wife of William Ross, 12th Lord Ross) and Lady Jean Hay (wife of John Hamilton-Leslie, 9th Earl of Rothes).

== Career ==
Tweeddale had legal knowledge, and was appointed an Extraordinary Lord of Session in 1721, the last person to hold this office. He was one of the Scottish representative peers from 1722 to 1734 and from 1742 to 1762. On the downfall of Robert Walpole in February 1742, William Pulteney, 1st Earl of Bath had the office of Secretary of State for Scotland revived (it had been in abeyance since 1739), and the Marquess of Tweeddale appointed to it, also making Tweeddale Principal Keeper of the Signet and a Privy Counsellor.

English members of the Government rejected the idea that a Jacobite insurrection was at hand. Tweeddale, who was in London in 1745, was also sceptical, and even after he was aware that the Highlanders had left Perth in their march to the south, he wrote to the Lord Advocate, "I flatter myself they have been able to make no great progress", on the day when the Young Pretender entered the Palace of Holyroodhouse.

In February 1746, when the rebellion was still active, a ministerial crisis took place. When the King refused to admit Pitt to the Government, Henry Pelham, the Prime Minister resigned, along with the members of the administration who supported him. When Earl Granville and Tweeddale unsuccessfully attempted to form a Ministry, Pelham returned to office. Granville and Tweeddale were excluded from the reconstructed Government. The office of Secretary of State for Scotland was abolished a second time, and Tweeddale resigned his office of Keeper of the Signet.

Tweeddale was Governor of the Bank of Scotland from 1742 and Lord Justice General in 1761 until his death in London in 1762.

During this period he built or converted a large mansion in Edinburgh between Hyndfords Close and St Marys Wynd: an area noe called Tweedale Court, which had long gardens running down to the Cowgate.

== Personal life ==
He married Lady Elizabeth (or Frances) Carteret, daughter of John Carteret, 2nd Earl Granville in 1748, and they had four daughters and two sons. The eldest son died in infancy; the younger, George, became fifth Marquess, and died in 1770 at age 13. The title then devolved on his uncle, George Hay. Frances was described by Horace Walpole and the Earl of Morton as merry, good company, and able to sing French, Greek, and Scotch songs.

=== Free Gardener ===
Hay was a Free Gardener. He was Initiated in the Dunfermline Lodge of Free Gardeners in 1721 and was immediately made Chancellor (Master) of the Lodge. His interest in the Lodge of Free Gardeners was an abiding one for he was again recorded as being Chancellor of the Lodge in 1742. There is no record of him becoming a Freemason.

Political offices
Unknown	Secretary of State for Scotland; 1742–1746	Unknown
Legal offices
Preceded by Earl of Ilay	Lord Justice General; 1761–1762	Succeeded by Duke of Queensberry
Peerage of Scotland
Preceded by Charles Hay	Marquess of Tweeddale; 1715–1762	Succeeded by George Hay
