= General Hays =

General Hays may refer to:

- Alexander Hays (1819–1864), Union Army brigadier general and brevet major general
- Anna Mae Hays (1920–2018), U.S. Army brigadier general
- George Price Hays (1892–1978), U.S. Army lieutenant general
- Harry T. Hays (1820–1876), Confederate States Army brigadier general
- Silas B. Hays (1902–1964), U.S. Army major general
- William Hays (general) (1819–1875), Union Army brigadier general

== See also ==
- General Hay (disambiguation)
- General Hayes (disambiguation)
