= Cosmopolitan Church of Prayer =

Coordinates: 41.7771°N 87.6043°W

- Cosmopolitan Church of Prayer
- Address: 5648 S State St, Chicago, IL 60621
- Country: USA
- Denomination: Church of Prayer
- Website: www.cosmopolitancop.com

History
- Founder: Dr. Charles G. Hayes

Cosmopolitan Church of Prayer is a Chicago church founded by gospel singer and pastor Charles G. Hayes.
