= John Hay, 2nd Marquess of Tweeddale =

Scottish nobleman (1645–1713)

The Most Honourable The Marquess of Tweeddale PC
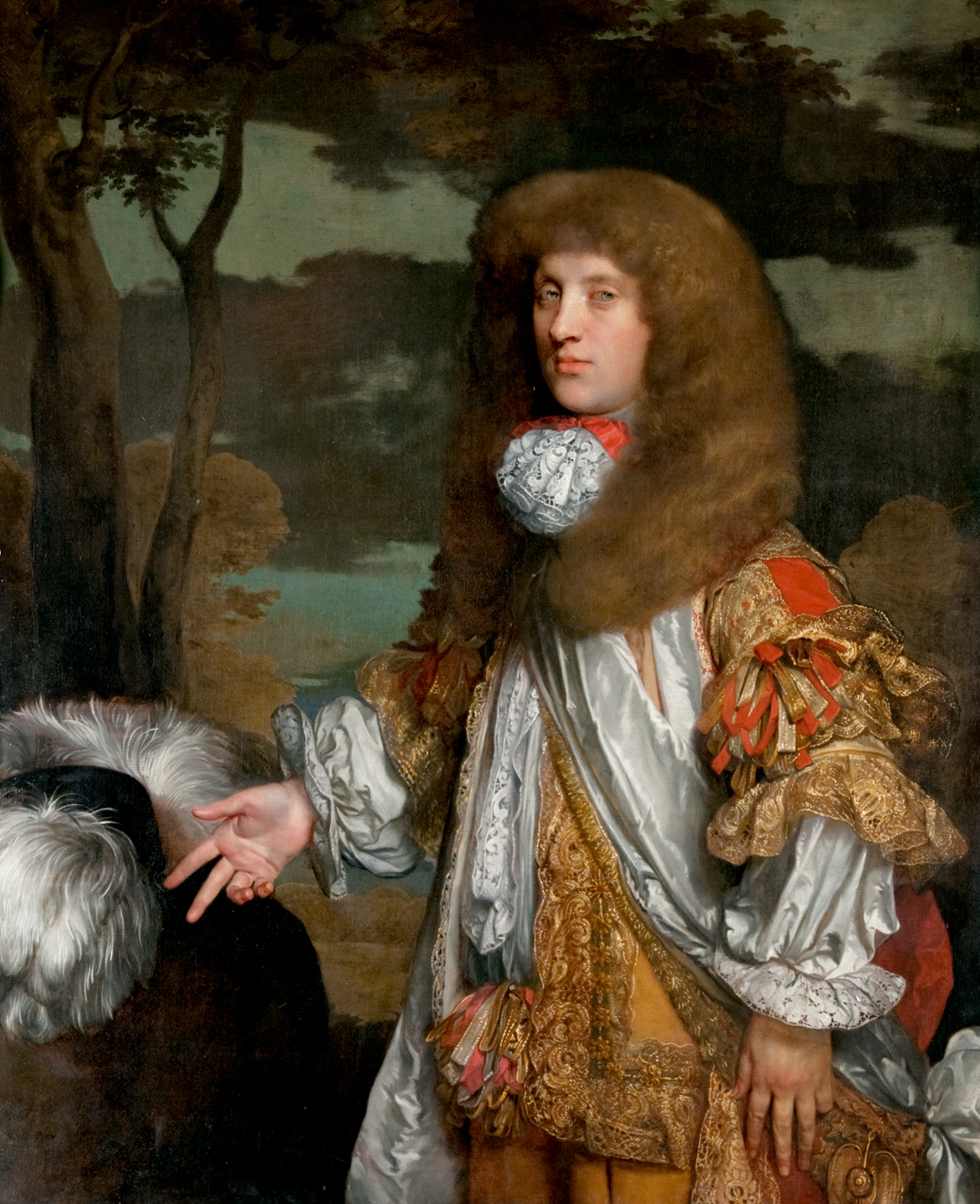
- Portrait by Gerard Soest.

Lord Chancellor of Scotland
- In office 1704–1705
- Monarch: Queen Anne
- Preceded by: The Earl of Seafield
- Succeeded by: The Earl of Seafield

Lord High Commissioner to the Parliament of Scotland
- In office 1704–1704
- Monarch: Queen Anne
- Preceded by: The Duke of Queensberry
- Succeeded by: The Duke of Argyll

Personal details
- Born: John Hay; 1645
- Died: 20 April 1713 (aged 67–68)
- Party: Squadrone Volante
- Spouse: Lady Mary Maitland
- Children: Charles, John
- Parent(s): John Hay, 1st Marquess of Tweeddale; Lady Jean Scott

Military service
- Allegiance: Kingdom of Scotland
- Years of service: 1668–1689
- Rank: Colonel

John Hay, 2nd Marquess of Tweeddale PC (1645 – 20 April 1713) was a Scottish nobleman.

== Early life ==
Hay was the eldest son of John Hay, 1st Marquess of Tweeddale and his wife, Lady Jean Scott, daughter of Walter Scott, 1st Earl of Buccleuch. His younger siblings were Lord David Hay of Belton (who married Rachel Hayes, daughter of Sir James Hayes), Lord Alexander Hay of Spott (who married Catherine Charters, daughter of Laurence Charters), Lady Margaret Hay (wife of Robert Ker, 3rd Earl of Roxburghe), and Lady Jean Hay (wife of William Douglas, 1st Earl of March).

His paternal grandparents were John Hay, 1st Earl of Tweeddale and, his first wife, Lady Jean Seton (only daughter by his second wife of Alexander Seton, 1st Earl of Dunfermline). His maternal grandparents were Walter Scott, 1st Earl of Buccleuch and Lady Mary Hay (third daughter of Francis Hay, 9th Earl of Erroll).

== Career ==
He was Colonel of the Militia Regiment of Foot in Co Haddington (1668–1674) and Linlithgow and Peebles (1682). He was Burgess of Edinburgh (1668), Commissioner for the Borders (1672–1684), Commissioner of Supply for Haddington (1678, 1685, 1690, 1704), Peebles (1678, 1685), Edinburgh (1690, 1704), Fife (1695, 1704), Berwick (1704); Colonel of the East Lothian Regiment (1685), Captain of the Militia Horse for Haddington and Berwick (1689), Privy Councillor of Scotland (1689), Sheriff of Haddington from 1694 to 1713, and Commissioner of the Admiralty (Scotland) (1695). He was also Lord Treasurer in 1695. He succeeded his father in the marquessate in 1697.

Tweeddale was elected to the court of directors of the Company of Scotland Trading to Africa and the Indies in March 1698. He was one of the principal leaders of the Country Party and used his involvement in the affairs of the Company to pursue his political agenda. On 25 March 1699, he and John Haldane of Gleneagles presented a National Address on behalf of the Company to William III & II in London. He was suspected of being an instigator of the Toubacanti riot in Edinburgh on 20 June 1700.

He was appointed Lord High Commissioner to the Parliament of Scotland in 1704, and was Lord Chancellor of Scotland from 1704 to 1705. He led the Squadrone Volante, but ultimately supported the Union. In October 1706, he was appointed to the Scottish parliamentary committee which scrutinised the Equivalent, the compensation to be paid to Scottish beneficiaries under the Union settlement, the largest group of which were the shareholders and creditors of the Company of Scotland. He was appointed one of 16 Scottish representative peers in 1707.

He had been elected a Fellow of the Royal Society in 1666 but was expelled in 1685.

== Personal life ==
In 1666, he married Lady Mary Maitland at Highgate in London. Lady Mary was a daughter of John Maitland, 1st Duke of Lauderdale and the former Anne Home. However, Lauderdale set himself against Hay, who was forced to leave for the continent and did not regain his position until Lauderdale's death in 1682. Together, they were the parents of:

- Charles Hay, 3rd Marquess of Tweeddale (c. 1670–1715), who married Lady Susan Cochrane, the widow of John Cochrane, 2nd Earl of Dundonald who was the second daughter of William Douglas-Hamilton, Duke of Hamilton, and Anne Hamilton, suo jure Duchess of Hamilton (eldest daughter and co-heiress of James Hamilton, 1st Duke of Hamilton).
- Lord John Hay (d. 1706), who commanded the famous regiment of dragoons, afterwards called the Scots Greys, at the Battle of Ramillies; he married Lady Elizabeth Dalzell, only child of James Dalzell, 3rd Earl of Carnwath, and, after her death, Elizabeth Orby, a daughter of Sir Thomas Orby, Bt.
- Lord William Hay (d. 1723) of Newhall, a Brig.-Gen. who married his cousin Margaret Hay, only child of John Hay (eldest son and heir apparent of Sir James Hay, 1st Baronet of Linplum) and Jean Foulis (daughter of Sir John Foulis, 1st Baronet of Ravelstoun).
- Lady Anne Hay, who married, as his third wife, William Ross, 12th Lord Ross.
- Lady Jean Hay (d. 1731), who married John Hamilton-Leslie, 9th Earl of Rothes, in 1697.

Lord Tweeddale died on 20 April 1713. He was succeeded in his titles by his eldest son, Charles.

Political offices
| Unknown | Treasurer of Scotland; 1695–? | Unknown |
| Preceded by The Duke of Queensberry | Lord High Commissioner to the Scottish Parliament; 1704 | Succeeded by The Duke of Argyll |
| Preceded by The Earl of Seafield | Lord Chancellor of Scotland; 1704–1705 | Succeeded by The Earl of Seafield |
Peerage of Scotland
| Preceded by John Hay | Marquess of Tweeddale; 1697–1713 | Succeeded by Charles Hay |
