= Charles Hay, 3rd Marquess of Tweeddale =

Scottish nobleman

The Most Honourable The Marquess of Tweeddale PC

Lord Lieutenant of Haddingtonshire
- In office 1715–1715
- Succeeded by: The Earl of Haddington

Personal details
- Born: Charles Hay; 1670
- Died: 7 December 1715 (aged 44–45)
- Spouse: Lady Susan Cochrane (m. 1694)
- Children: John Hay, 4th Marquess of Tweeddale; Lord Charles Hay; George Hay, 6th Marquess of Tweeddale
- Parent(s): John Hay, 2nd Marquess of Tweeddale; Lady Mary Maitland
- Relatives: Lord John Hay (brother)

Charles Hay, 3rd Marquess of Tweeddale PC (1670 – 7 December 1715) was a Scottish nobleman.

== Early life ==
He was the eldest son of John Hay, 2nd Marquess of Tweeddale and the former Lady Mary Maitland. His younger brother, Lord John Hay, commanded the famous regiment of dragoons, afterwards called the Scots Greys, at the Battle of Ramillies. Another brother, Brig.-Gen. Lord William Hay of Newhall married their cousin Margaret Hay. His sisters were Lady Anne Hay (the third wife of William Ross, 12th Lord Ross) and Lady Jean Hay (wife of John Hamilton-Leslie, 9th Earl of Rothes).

His paternal grandparents were John Hay, 1st Marquess of Tweeddale and his wife, Jean Scott (a daughter of Walter Scott, 1st Earl of Buccleuch). His maternal grandparents were John Maitland, 1st Duke of Lauderdale and the former Anne Home.

== Career ==
He was a Commissioner of Supply in 1695 and 1704 and was made a Privy Councillor of Scotland in c. 1697. He served as High Sheriff of Haddingtonshire from 1714 to 1715.

From 1714 until his death, he was a Representative Peer for Scotland. He also served as President of the Court of Police and Lord Lieutenant of Haddingtonshire in 1715.

== Personal life ==
Around 1694, he married Lady Susan Cochrane, the widow of John Cochrane, 2nd Earl of Dundonald, the second daughter of William Douglas-Hamilton, Duke of Hamilton, and Anne Hamilton, suo jure Duchess of Hamilton (eldest daughter and co-heiress of James Hamilton, 1st Duke of Hamilton). Before his death in 1715, they were the parents of three boys:

- John Hay, 4th Marquess of Tweeddale (1695–1762), who married Lady Frances Carteret, fourth daughter of John Carteret, 2nd Earl Granville.
- Lord Charles Hay (c. 1699–1760), of Linplum, an MP for Haddingtonshire who was a Major-General in the British Army.
- George Hay, 6th Marquess of Tweeddale (1700–1787), who died unmarried.

Lord Tweeddale died on 7 December 1715 and was succeeded in his titles and estates by his eldest son, John. His widow died on 7 February 1736.

Peerage of Scotland
Preceded by John Hay	Marquess of Tweeddale; 1713–1715	Succeeded by John Hay
