= General Hayes =

General Hayes may refer to:

- Charles H. Hayes (1906–1995), U.S. Marine Corps lieutenant general
- Eric Hayes (1896–1951), British Army major general
- J. Michael Hayes (fl. 1960s–1990s), U.S. Marine Corps brigadier general
- Joseph Hayes (general), (1835–1912), Union Army brigadier general
- Philip Hayes (United States Army officer) (1887–1949), U.S. Army major general
- Richard Hayes (general) (fl. 1980s–2010s), U.S. Army National Guard major general
- Rutherford B. Hayes (1822–1893), Union Army brigadier general and brevet major general, later President of the United States
- Thomas J. Hayes III (1914–2004), U.S. Army major general
- Webb Hayes (1856–1934), U.S. Army brigadier general

== See also ==
- General Hays (disambiguation)
