= Lord Charles Hay =

British Army officer (c. 1700–1976)

Major-General Lord Charles Hay
- Born: c. 1700
- Died: 1 May 1760 (aged 59–60)
- Relatives: John Hay, 4th Marquess of Tweeddale (brother)
- Military career
- Allegiance: Kingdom of Great Britain
- Branch: British Army
- Service years: 1722–1760
- Rank: Major-General
- Conflicts: Anglo-Spanish War; Siege of Gibraltar; War of the Polish Succession; War of the Austrian Succession; Battle of Dettingen; Battle of Fontenoy; French and Indian War

Lord Charles Hay (c. 1700 – 1 May 1760) was a British Army officer who saw service in the Anglo-Spanish War, the Wars of the Polish and Austrian Successions, and the Seven Years' War. He combined this with a political career, sitting for a time as a member of parliament.

Born into the nobility, the younger son of a marquess, Hay entered the army and rose through the ranks, seeing action in some of the European campaigns of the Anglo-Spanish War and the War of the Polish Succession. He won particular renown during the War of the Austrian Succession, when he commanded some of the regiments involved in the fighting. He saw action at the Battles of Dettingen and Fontenoy, distinguishing himself in the latter with an encounter with a French regiment, that was later remarked upon by Voltaire. His political career was also turbulent, at times spent in opposition to the Administration. It ended after a period of apparent mental instability, and he did not seek re-election. Further military promotions nevertheless followed.

Hay was appointed to an important command early in the Seven Years' War, to be part of a force sent to capture Louisbourg, but the commanders vacillated and Hay became discontent. He was overheard making opprobrious remarks about the conduct of the campaign, and was arrested. He spent some time waiting for a ship to be able to return to England, and on arriving there, demanded a court-martial to investigate the facts. The court-martial referred its decision to the king, but Hay died suddenly in 1760, before it could be announced.

== Family and early life ==
Lord Charles Hay was born c. 1700, the third son of Charles Hay, 3rd Marquess of Tweeddale, and his wife Lady Susan Hamilton, the daughter of William Douglas, Duke of Hamilton. Lord Charles was the younger brother of John Hay, 4th Marquess of Tweeddale. Hay entered the army, being gazetted ensign in the 2nd Regiment of Foot Guards on 18 May 1722, and a captain in the 33rd Regiment of Foot on 14 May 1727. He was apparently present at the siege of Gibraltar in 1727, and in 1729 he was serving as a captain of the 9th Regiment of Dragoons. He took part as a volunteer in the armies of Prince Eugene of Savoy during the Rhine campaigns of 1734 in the War of the Polish Succession. He was elected as the member of parliament for Haddingtonshire in 1741 and on 7 April 1743 was given command of a company in the 3rd Foot Guards. He took part in the European campaigns of the War of the Austrian Succession, and was a virtual, if not actual, lieutenant-colonel of the 1st Regiment of Foot Guards at the Battles of Dettingen and Fontenoy.

== Fontenoy ==
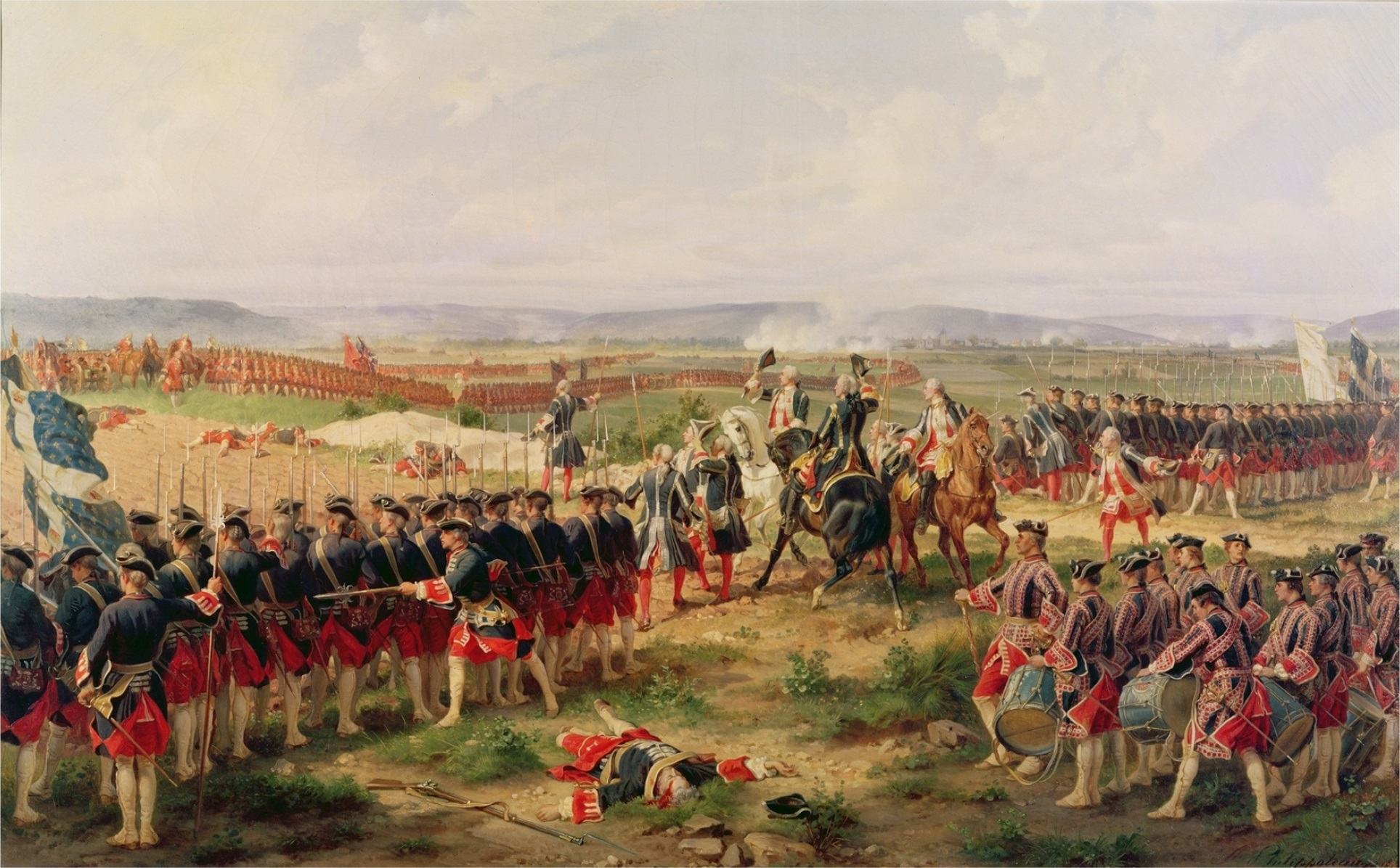
The Battle of Fontenoy, 1873, by Henri Félix Emmanuel Philippoteaux. Showing the meeting between the French Guards and Hay's 1st Regiment of Foot Guards.

Deploying with the army on 11 May 1745, the day of the battle' he unexpectedly found himself, on reaching the crest of a low hill, face to face with the French Guards Regiment, who, though anticipating an engagement as little as Hay, showed no sign of disorder. According to the French accounts, of which Voltaire's is the best known, Lord Charles stepped from the ranks and, in response to a similar movement promptly made by the French commander, politely called to him to order his people to fire, but in reply was assured, with equal politeness, that the French guards never fired first. According to the story which he himself sent in a letter to his brother three weeks later, his men came within twenty or thirty paces of the enemy, whereupon he advanced in front of the regiment, drank to the health of the French, bantered them with more spirit than pungency on their defeat at Dettingen, and then turned and called on his own men to huzzah, which they did. Hay recalled that "it was our regiment that attacked the French Guards: and when we came to within twenty or thirty paces of them, I advanced before our regiment; drank to them and told them that we were the English Guards, and hoped they would stand till we came quite up to them, and not swim the Scheldt as they did the Main at Dettingen."

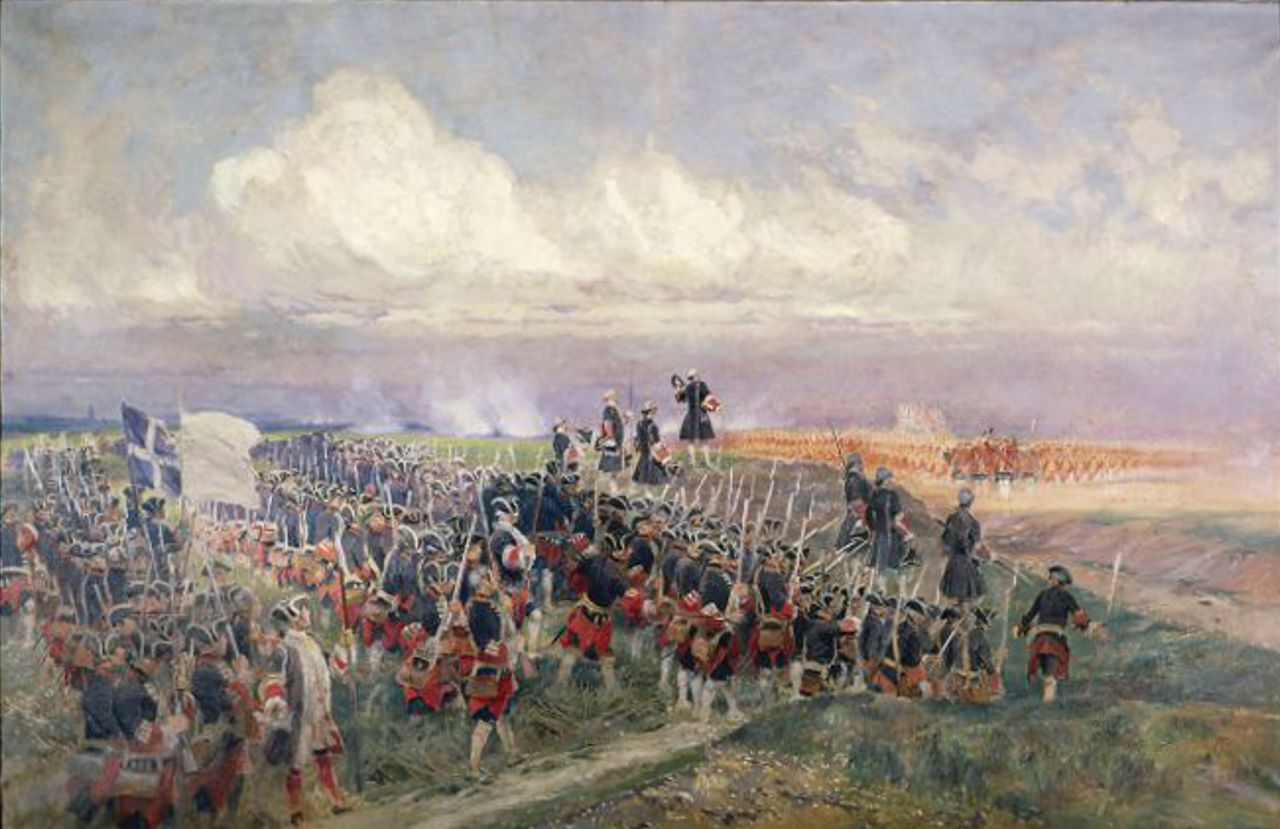
Another view of the meeting, Hay and the French commander advancing to banter in front of their men. A work by Édouard Detaille.

One of Hay's biographers noted that "whichever be the correct version of the occurrence, Hay unquestionably showed extraordinary coolness." Hay was severely wounded in the ensuing battle, and was initially reported to have been killed. He recovered and continued his career in politics, supporting the Hanoverian faction and the Carteret Ministry. A professional soldier, he was described by Horace Walpole in a letter to Sir Horace Mann as having "more of the parts of an Irishman than of a Scot", and was "so vain of having made a campaign ... [on the Rhine] in 1734, that he talked of it ever after and went by the name of Trentquatre". Walpole had reason to dislike Hay, who supported Lord Carteret against Sir Robert Walpole's Ministry and opposed Walpole's candidate for the chairman of the elections committee. With Walpole's fall in 1742, Hay supported Carteret's new Administration, and its successor, the Pelham Ministry. His political career came to an end after a period in November 1746, when he was apparently "confined raving mad" and to have "been tied in his bed some time". He did not seek re-election at the 1747 general election.

== Promotions ==
He was made aide-de-camp to King George II in March 1749, and in August was promoted to colonel. In 1751 he succeeded his kinsman Sir Robert Hay, 2nd Baronet to the estate of Linplum in Haddingtonshire. From 1753 until 1760 he was Colonel of the 33rd Regiment of Foot. With the outbreak of the Seven Years' War he was further promoted, to major-general, on 22 February 1757 and was second in command of the force sent to Halifax, Nova Scotia under General Peregrine Hopson. The force was part of the expedition under Lord Loudoun.

== Halifax and dismissal ==
Loudoun's progress towards the goal of capturing Louisbourg appears to have been too cautious for Hay's liking. The French had sent heavy naval reinforcements, and the attack was called off. Hay had arrived at Halifax on 9 July and was dismayed at the inaction of his superiors. Colonel John Forbes overheard him criticising the conduct of the campaign, commenting while their troops exercised in a sham attack that "by God, difficult as it may be, I shall find a method of letting the mother country know what is doing here, that we are taken up in building sham forts and making approaches to them, when we should be employed in real attacks. The fleet should sail up the bason, and have a sham fight there; and then we might write home that we had a sea fight and taken a fort." He was also said to have commented that "the general was keeping the courage of his majesty's troops at bay, and expending the nation's wealth in making sham sieges and planting cabbages when he ought to have been fighting." The news reached Loudoun, who had Hay arrested in July for "uttering various opprobrious and disrespectful speeches". He did not press a charge though, instead suggesting that "the voyage, climate and season of the year have been prejudicial to his Lordship’s health." The implication was that Hay had gone mad, or suffered a breakdown, and he was closely confined for seven months while awaiting passage back to England. He volunteered for service aboard the 74-gun HMS Dublin, which had arrived in Halifax in May 1758 under the command of Captain George Brydges Rodney, carrying Major-General Jeffery Amherst. Hay observed the successful siege and capture of Louisbourg from the Dublin, before his return to England aboard HMS Shannon.

Hay demanded a court-martial to investigate the charges. This was agreed to, with Hay charged with endeavouring "to bring into contempt the conduct and authority of the commanders of the fleet and land forces in America," and with behaving "in a manner evidently tending to excite mutiny and sedition amongst the troops." The court-martial took place between 12 February and 4 March 1760. Samuel Johnson, who met Hay about this time, was apparently "mightily" pleased with his conversation, and remarked that his defence was "a very good soldierly defence." The result of the court-martial was not made public, but was referred to the king for judgement. Before the king could decide on the matter, Hay died, on 1 May 1760. He was unmarried. Hay's biographer, Julian Gwyn, remarked that it was "doubtful that the first charge would have stuck; the second ... was absurd."

== Citations ==
Parliament of Great Britain
Preceded by John Cockburn	Member of Parliament for Haddingtonshire; 1741–1747	Succeeded by Sir Hew Dalrymple
