= Charles G. Hayes =

American gospel musician and pastor

The Reverend Dr. Charles G. Hayes
- Also known as: Dr. Charles G. Hayes; Rev. Charles G. Hayes
- Born: Charles George Hayes; December 10, 1937; Verbena, Alabama
- Died: February 12, 2014 (aged 76) Oak Lawn, Illinois
- Genres: Gospel, traditional black gospel, urban contemporary gospel
- Occupations: Singer, songwriter
- Instruments: Vocals, singer-songwriter
- Years active: 1951–2012
- Labels: Savoy, Word, Epic, Intersound, Meek, Utopia, Icee, MCG, Cosmo Sounds, Grammercy
- Formerly of: The Cosmopolitan Church of Prayer Choir

Charles George Hayes (December 10, 1937 – February 12, 2014) was an American gospel musician and founding pastor of Cosmopolitan Church of Prayer.

He enjoyed a career spanning over 50 years as a musician with the Cosmopolitan Church of Prayer Choir that would be showcased on the church's radio programs. He would release over 30 albums with several labels including Savoy Records Word Records, Epic Records, Intersound Records, Meek Records, Utopia Music Group, Icee Records, MCG Records, Cosmo Sounds Music Group, and Grammercy Records.

Hayes released five albums that charted on the Billboard magazine Gospel Albums chart, Turn It over to Jesus in 1989 with Intersound Records, 1992's I'll Never Forget with Savoy Gospel Records, 2002's Rise & Sing Forever with Meek Records, The Remix in 2005 with Icee Records, and 2012's Back Again with Cosmo Sounds Music Group. The album, The Remix, placed on three more Billboard charts R&B Albums, Independent Albums, and Heatseekers Albums.

== Early life ==
Hayes was born on December 10, 1937, in Verbena, Alabama, as Charles George Hayes to parents Will Hayes and Mamie Lee Hayes. He was a graduate of Siluria Jr. High School and Prentice High School in Montevallo, Alabama. At 18 years old, Hayes relocated to Chicago, Illinois, where he was ordained on August 31, 1957, at 19 years old to be a minister. He founded the Cosmopolitan Church of Prayer when he was 21 on April 28, 1959, which the first service occurred at Morris Jackson's home down in the basement. This was at 634 Woodland Park in Chicago at this time. After a short while, he relocated the church to Cottage Grove Avenue. He did an evening radio program to reach listeners, who could not come to his church. He earned his doctorate degree from Religious Science Institute during December 1973. He got an honorary doctorate of human letters bestowed upon him from St. Martins College and Seminary during September 1974.

== Music career ==
Father Hayes started his gospel recording career in 1962 with "God's Tomorrow" released on Sound -O-Rama records with the cosmopolitan Church of Prayer Choir with Charles Clency as the minister of music. Hayes and the choir would subsequently release more albums in the 1960s and 1970s including "Where You Gonna Run To," "Got to Keep Moving," "Well Done Servant," and "Heaven is my Goal." They became very popular in the gospel music industry as their hits would be a standard in church services around the country. The choir would ascend to increased national recognition when in 1980, Hayes and Cosmo would release Everything's Alright with Savoy Records. He and the choir recorded over 30 albums and releases 5 single 45's in over 50 years. Out of them, he made the Billboard magazine Gospel Albums chart, for five of those releases. Those releases are the following; Turn It over to Jesus in 1989 with Intersound Records at No. 12, No. 6 for I'll Never Forget with Savory Gospel in 1992, 2002's Rise & Sing Forever at No. 22 with Meek Records, The Remix with Icee Records in 2005 peaking at No. 3, and 2012's Back Again at No. 21 with Cosmo Sounds Records. The album, The Remix, placed on three more Billboard charts at No. 55 on the R&B Albums, No. 25 on the Independent Albums, and No. 15 on the Heatseekers Albums.

== Personal life ==
Dr. Hayes was never married, but had two sons, Marcus Hayes and Charles G. Hayes Jr., and numerous grandchildren and great-grandchildren at the time of his death in a nursing home in Oak Park, Illinois, on February 12, 2014.

== Discography ==
List of selected studio albums, with selected chart positions
Title	Album details	Peak chart positions
Title	Album details	US Gos
Turn It over to Jesus	Released: 1989; Label: Intersound; CD, digital download	12
I'll Never Forget	Released: 1992; Label: Savoy Gospel; CD, digital download	6
Rise & Sing Forever	Released: 2002; Label: Meek; CD, digital download	22
The Remix	Released: 2005; Label: Icee; CD, digital download	3
Back Again	Released: 2012; Label: Cosmo Sounds; CD, digital download	21
