= J. Michael Hayes =

United States Marine Corps general

J. Michael Hayes is a retired brigadier general in the United States Marine Corps and is the Managing Director of the Office of Military and Federal Affairs of Maryland.

== Biography ==
A native of Milwaukee, Wisconsin, Hayes is a graduate of the University of Wisconsin-Madison. He is married to Barbara Paterson of Milwaukee. They have two children and four grandchildren.

== Military career ==
Hayes was commissioned an officer in 1966. He would serve in the Vietnam War, and would take part in the Tet Offensive.

After returning to the United States, he was stationed at Headquarters Marine Corps and, later, at The Pentagon.

Later in his career, he served in the Gulf War before being promoted to Brigadier General in 1995. He retired in 1999.

Awards he received include the Silver Star, the Defense Superior Service Medal, the Legion of Merit with award star, the Bronze Star Medal with award star and valor device, the Purple Heart, the Defense Meritorious Service Medal, the Meritorious Service Medal, as well as Combat Action Ribbon, four Presidential Unit Citations, two Navy Unit Commendations and the Meritorious Unit Commendation.
