= Pierre Thouvenot =

French general (1757–1817)

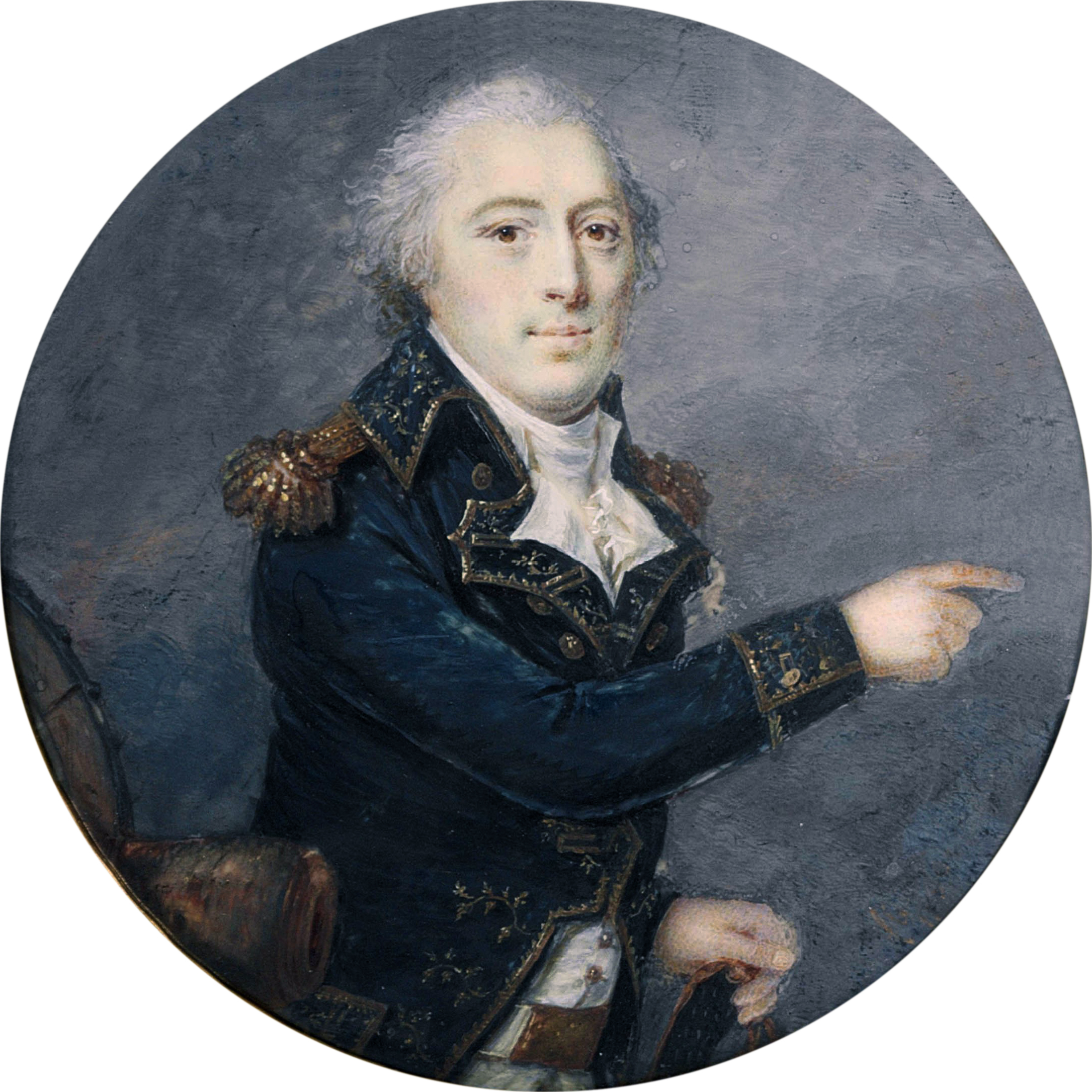
- General Baron Thouvenot by Antoine-Claude Fleury
- Born: 9 March 1757; Toul, France
- Died: 21 July 1817 (aged 60); Orly, France
- Military career
- Allegiance: Kingdom of France; French First Republic; First French Empire
- Branch: French Army
- Service years: 1779–1814
- Rank: General
- Awards: Baron de l'Empire; Officier de la Légion d'honneur Chevalier de Saint-Louis

Pierre Thouvenot (English: /tuːvəˈnoʊ/ too-vuh-NOH, French: [pjɛʁ tuvəno]; 9 March 1757 – 21 July 1817) was a French Army officer who served with distinction in the Anglo-French War (1778-1783). He fled from France during the revolution but returned under an amnesty and went on to serve in Napoleonic Wars. Thouvenot is most famous for his defence of Bayonne in 1814 and the sortie he made when the war was all but over, which drew criticism from both sides, particularly from the Duke of Wellington, who branded him a "blackguard".

== Early career ==
Thouvenot was born on 9 March 1757 in Toul, Meurthe-et-Moselle, France. He did not join the military until 1779, having spent the previous five years as a geographical engineer. He enrolled at L'école d'artillerie de La Fère, leaving as a cadet in the French artillery during December 1779. He served for a time on the Île de Ré where he became a Second-lieutenant in 1780 before being sent to Guadeloupe. He distinguished himself in Bouillé's attack on St Lucia in May 1781, and took part in the subsequent invasion of Tobago. Thouvenot received a promotion to lieutenant in 1783 and continued to serve in the Caribbean following the Treaty of Paris. He was promoted to captain in 1788 and was made a Chevalier de Saint-Louis (Knight of Saint Louis) in 1791 and was appointed to the foundry at Indret, near Nantes, initially as an inspector but later as its director. Towards the end of 1792, Thouvenot was promoted to lieutenant-colonel and was transferred, as director, to the foundry at Malines.

== Exile ==
Leaving naval armament behind in December 1792, Thouvenot returned to serving with the army in the field as the commander of the Belgium artillery and in February the following year, he became attached to General Charles François Dumouriez, as his chief of staff. When, some two months later, a warrant for his arrest was issued by the new government in France, Thouvenot was prompted to flee Belgium. He was captured by Austrian soldiers and imprisoned at Treurenberg. After his release in 1794, Thouvenot sought refuge in the neutral Duchy of Brunswick-Lüneburg where he remained until an amnesty was granted by Napoleon in 1800.

== Return to military service ==
Thouvenot returned to France and the military; and with a promotion to colonel, was part of a force sent to Saint-Domingue to combat insurgency by the slaves there and served as Chief of staff to Generals Edme Étienne Borne Desfourneaux, Bertrand Clausel and Jean-Baptiste Salme successively. Desfourneaux's reprisals were brutal. After his first major operation, Thouvenot recorded how, over a seven-day period, slaves were hunted down and shot, hanged or clubbed to death.

In recognition of his actions, which included the liberation of Port-de-Paix from insurrectionists, Thouvenot was promoted again, on 15 October 1802, this time to general of brigade, and given command of the artillery of the Army of Santo Domingo. On 10 April 1803 Thouvenot was made the army's chief of staff, but the actions and decadent lifestyle of his commanding officer, General Donatien-Marie-Joseph de Vimeur, vicomte de Rochambeau, so enraged Thouvenot and Clausel that they planned to have him removed. On hearing of the plot, Rochambeau accused the conspirators of stealing supplies and had them both deported. Thouvenot returned to France a few months later having found passage via Cuba.

Thouvenot's version of events regarding the Rochambeau affair, was accepted by Napoleon, and in 1805; Thouvenot was sent to the Rhineland, where he joined the second division of the II Corps in the Grande Armée and took part in operations in Prussia and Pomerania. Thouvenot served as governor of Würzburg in the then Electorate of Bavaria, before successively taking up the post at Erfurt in Prussia, and the towns of Stettin and Stralsund, both in Pomerania. While on active service with Louis Henri Loison's division in 1807, he was wounded in the siege of Kolberg, on 14 June.

== Military Governor in Spain ==
Thouvenot was reputed to be an efficient administrator. That is why Napoleón entrusted him with the government of a key province; on 18 January 1808, Thouvenot was sent to Guipúzcoa, Spain, the region through which most of the Imperial troops entered. On 5 March 1808 Thouvenot occupied San Sebastián without encountering resistance.

In his new position, Thouvenot showed himself as an active, competent, and professional. He always maintained strict discipline and imposed harsh punishments on the resistance. His reports reveal an appreciation of the situation, but he never questions the war, the occupation or the chances of success of the occupation. He was the disciplined soldier who obeyed orders and nothing else.

When Joseph Bonaparte arrived in San Sebastián in June 1808, Thouvenot sent a report to Paris explaining without any hesitation the coldness of the reception and the hostility of the population. Gipuzkoa priests began a covert strike, resisting to celebrate the mass. To resolve the matter without repressive measures, Thouvenot increased the pay of the priests. It was also relatively common for him to give in to the pleas of the authorities or the neighbors to pardon a detainee, or to reduce a sentence.

On 18 July 1809, Thouvenot founded the first Masonic lodge in Spain, the Frères Unis. All the members were French soldiers, but they expected some important figures from the province of Guipuzcoa to join the lodge. The French used this system across Europe to recruit collaborators, but in the Basque Country, a very Catholic region, only managed one recruit.

During these years, Thouvenot rarely saw combat, focusing on administrative problems. On the other hand, he had very few troops. When the British and the guerrillas coordinated a systematic amphibious offensive in July 1809, General Thouvenot did not launch a counterattack, because: "I do not have a single soldier to set in motion (...). My forces here do not reach 300 men able to carry arms, and therefore it is impossible for me to send forces against the enemy. It is painful in such circumstances not to have a single soldier and to see the enemy destroy all the defenses of the coast".

== Military Governor of the 4th Military Government "Vizcaya" (Basque Country) ==
In February 1810 Napoleon created four military governments, separating Spain from the border regions with France. The 4th Military Government, called 'Vizcaya' actually covered the three Basque Provinces. Thouvenot was appointed governor and created an advisory council in each province, consisting of two owners, two merchants, an accountant and a treasurer. Above these provincial councils there was a council of nine members, three per province, which responded to Thouvenot himself. The members had to be large owners or rich businessmen, be able to read and write and speak French, since Thouvenot humbly admitted that he did not speak Spanish.

Thouvenot tried to attract the population through good administration. He was informed in detail about the situation in the country. He issued pardons, left all possible matters in the hands of local authorities and organized numerous parties in San Sebastian. On 17 April he ordered the creation of public libraries, using the books of the suppressed convents. He appointed official architects in each province to deal with public works such as bridges, roads, hydraulic works, etc. He also took hygienic precautions to avoid epidemics. As an essential element of his government action, Thouvenot created an official newspaper, La Gaceta de Vizcaya, which appeared three times a week. Mixed news, propaganda and official communications. The administrative work of Thouvenot was favored by his stability in the position, since he remained in the same until the end of the war, while other commands were replaced with excessive frequency. For example, Navarra had six different governors during the six years of the Napoleonic occupation. His salary was high and he lived with great luxury at the expense of the Basques, but he never devoted himself to plundering the occupied territory for his own benefit. That puts him well above the average of the Napoleonic military who sacked Spain.

The Thouvenot system of government was authoritarian and centralist, suppressing any municipal autonomy. He appointed and dismissed the mayors. Many of the new mayors had not even presented themselves as candidates, and tried by all means to avoid the appointment, so coveted previously. Military governments had been created expressly to collect many taxes and finance the French army. In 18 months, Thouvenot raised 40 million reais. Raising so much money impoverished many people, who joined the guerrillas.

To fight against the guerrillas, Thouvenot tried to create local collaborationist militia called Civic Guards. They were formed by the mayors and the wealthiest neighbors of each municipality. Some of them caused serious problems to the guerrillas during 1810 and 1811, but by the end of 1811 all had deserted or been disarmed by the guerrillas, often without resistance.

== Baron of the Empire ==
In January 1811 Thouvenot moved his headquarters from San Sebastian to Vitoria, a more central position, better communicated with Burgos, Bilbao, Logroño, Pamplona and Bessieres' General Headquarters in Valladolid. That year he was rewarded for his service, being made a Baron de l'Empire (Baron of the Empire) and Officier de la Légion d'honneur (Officer of the Legion of Honour).

In 1812 the harvests were disastrous. 1812 was "The Year of Hunger". In August the food crisis was so bad in Bilbao that Thouvenot organized the distribution of an 'economic soup'. The municipalities stopped paying taxes. In Bilbao, the members of the municipality and the consulate of commerce were arrested by order of Thouvenot and taken prisoner to Vitoria, as hostages to force the town to pay the taxes.

During 1812–1813, Basque guerrillas grew in number and organization until they could defeat in open field battle Napoleonic forces equal in number. The French lost control of rural areas and were expelled from the city of Bilbao. This meant a serious strategic threat to the Napoleonic communications, because most of the troops and supplies arriving from France crossed the Basque Provinces. Thouvenot had to focus on protecting convoys of supplies. He showed great skill, cunning, cold blood in this campaign, fighting on many fronts at the same time with insufficient resources. Even as the Battle of Vitoria on 21 June 1813, was about to begin, he found time to attend to the complaints of a priest and order uncontrolled soldiers to stop looting a municipality in Alava.

== Battle of Bayonne ==
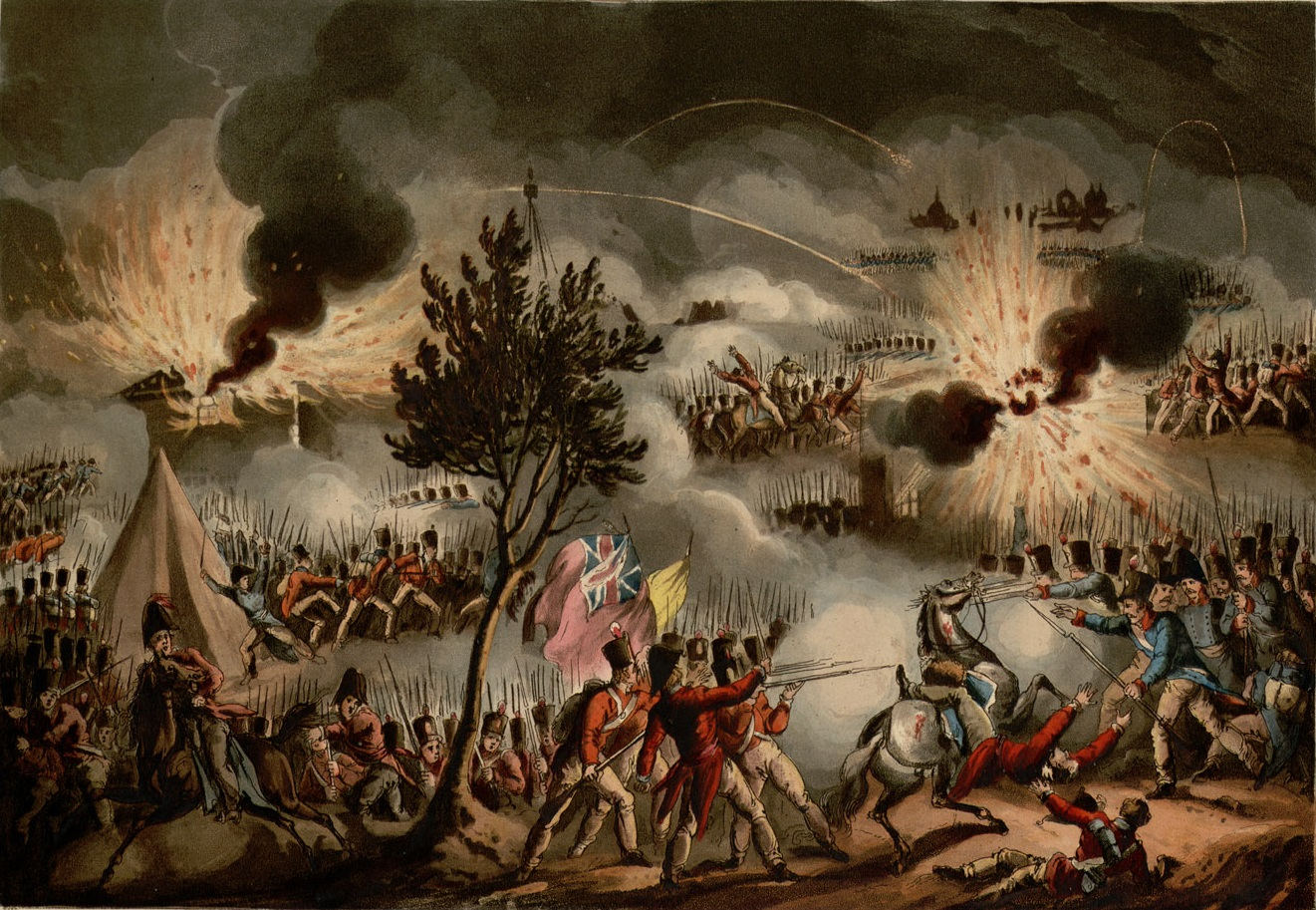
The sortie from the besieged city of Bayonne on 14 April 1814, which took place despite news of Napoleon's abdication having already reached both sides

After the Battle of Vitoria, General Thouvenot joined Marshal Soult's army in the Pyrenees where he held various commands before being appointed General of division on 25 November 1813. In February the following year, Thouvenot was made governor of the city of Bayonne.

On 27 February 1814, having crossed the River Adour, Wellington's army began to lay siege to the city of Bayonne. During the fight for the suburb of St Etienne, which the British required to complete their investment, Thouvenot was wounded by a bullet to the thigh. The British and their allies were slow to start their preparations and had thus failed to force the city to surrender when, on 13 April 1814, news of Napoleon's abdication reached the British lines. Despite having received the news unofficially on 12 April and although it was widely known that a new French government would sue for peace; Thouvenot ordered a sortie which proved to be the last major action of the Peninsular War. On the morning of 14 April, Thouvenot attacked the British siege lines with 6,000 men. The French sortie was defeated but with heavy losses on both sides. The Allies suffered 838 casualties, including Major-general Andrew Hay who was killed defending the church of St Etiene and Sir John Hope, who was wounded and captured while charging into a melee on his horse. French casualties totalled 905 men, including 111 killed, 778 wounded and 16 missing. The siege of Bayonne continued obstinately until 27 April when written orders from Marshal Soult finally compelled Thouvenot to hand the fortress over to the British.

Thouvenot's actions were condemned by both sides as a needless waste of lives. Particularly scathing was the Duke of Wellington who branded Thouvenot a "blackguard". In Bayonne, however, a monument was raised and an annual celebration of Thouvenot's "brave" defence still takes place. Sir Charles Colville did not join in the criticism either. He thought Thouvenot to be, "a well intentioned and gentlemanly individual" and suggested that perhaps the sortie had been forced upon him by his subordinates.

Thouvenot was sent back to Bayonne when Napoleon returned from exile in Elba but after defeat at Waterloo and the restoration of the monarchy, Thouvenot was labelled inactive and never served the French military again. He died in Orly on 21 July 1817. Pierre Thouvenot is one of the 660 names inscribed on the Arc de Triomphe in Paris.

== Bibliography ==
- Corrigan, Gordon (2001). Wellington: A Military Life. London: Hambledon Continuum. ISBN 1-85285-262-3.
- Gates, David (2001). The Spanish Ulcer: A History of the Peninsular War. Da Capo Press. ISBN 0-306-81083-2.
- Girard, Philippe R. (2011). The Slaves Who Defeated Napoleon: Toussaint, Louverture and the Haitian War of Independence, 1801 - 1804. Tuscaloosa: University of Alabama Press. ISBN 9780817317324.
- Glover, Michael (2001). The Peninsular War 1807–1814. London: Penguin Books. ISBN 0-14-139041-7.
- Haythornthwaite, Philip J. (1998). Who Was Who in the Napoleonic Wars. London: Cassel Publishing. ISBN 978-1854093912.
- Haythornthwaite, Philip J. (2002). Napoleon's Commanders 2. Oxford: Osprey Publishing. ISBN 1-84176-345-4.
- Haythornthwaite, Philip J. (2004). The Peninsular War: The Complete Companion to the Iberian Campaigns 1807 - 1814. London: Brassey’s Almanacs. ISBN 1-85753-329-1.
- Heathcote, T. A. (2010). Wellington's Peninsular War Generals and Their Battles. Barnsley: Pen and Sword Books. ISBN 978-1-84884-061-4.
- Sanchez Arreseigor, Juan José (2010). Vascos contra Napoleón (in Spanish). Madrid: Editorial Actas. ISBN 978-84-9739-099-6.
- Smith, Digby (1998). The Greenhill Napoleonic Wars Data Book. London: Greenhill Books. ISBN 1-85367-276-9.
