= Charles Hays (disambiguation) =

Charles Hays (1834–1879) was an American politician from Alabama.

Charles Hays may also refer to:

- Charles Marshall Hays (1845–1917), American politician in Idaho
- Charles Melville Hays (1856–1912), American railway executive and victim of RMS Titanic
