= Orby baronets =

Extinct baronetcy in the Baronetage of England

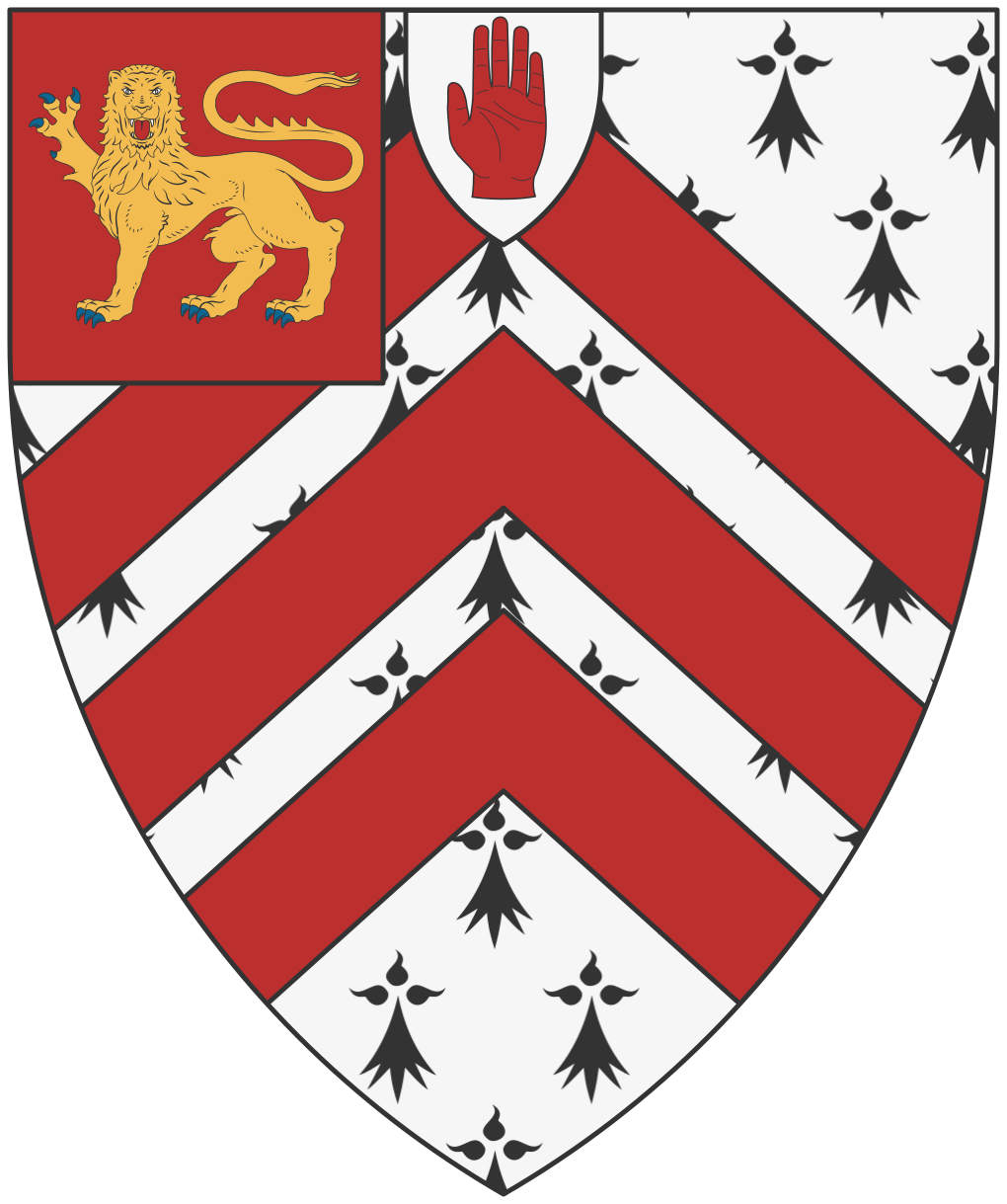
The coat of arms of the Orby of Croyland, Baronets.

The Orby Baronetcy, of Croyland in the County of Lincoln, was a title in the Baronetage of England. It was created on 9 October 1658 for Thomas Orby. The title became extinct on the death of the third Baronet in 1725.

== Orby baronets, of Croyland (1658) ==
- Sir Thomas Orby, 1st Baronet (died c. 1691)
- Sir Charles Orby, 2nd Baronet (c. 1640–c. 1716)
- Sir Thomas Orby, 3rd Baronet (c. 1658–1725)
