= Lord John Hay (Scottish Army officer) =

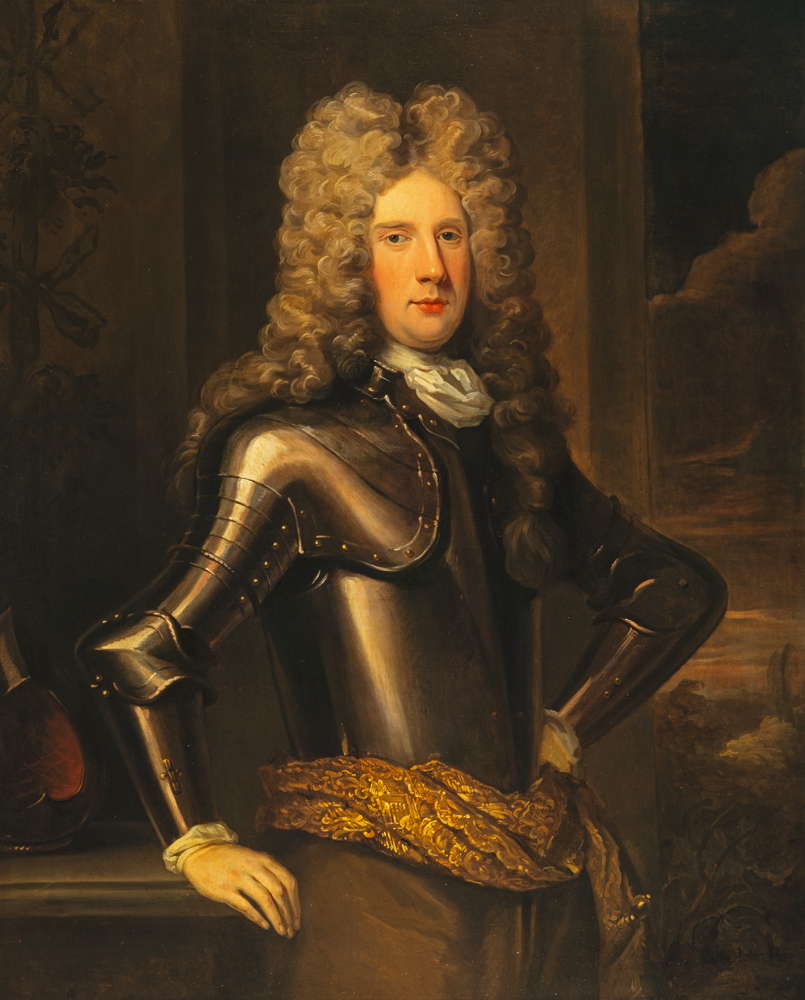
- Lord John Hay, portrait by John Baptist Medina
- Born: 1668
- Died: 25 August 1706 (aged 38); Courtrai, Spanish Netherlands
- Military career
- Allegiance: Kingdom of Scotland
- Branch: Royal Scots Army
- Rank: Colonel
- Commands: Grey Dragoons
- Conflicts: War of the Spanish Succession: Battle of Schellenberg; Battle of Blenheim; Battle of Ramillies

Brigadier-General Lord John Hay (c. 1668 – 25 August 1706) was the second son of John Hay, 2nd Marquess of Tweeddale. He served in the British Army under the Duke of Marlborough.

== Military service ==
Hay was born the second son of John Hay, 2nd Marquess of Tweeddale. He became a captain in the Royal Scots Dragoons on 16 July 1689. He was promoted to major on 8 September 1692 and lieutenant-colonel on 28 February 1694. He was promoted to colonel in 1702 and became colonel of his regiment in 1704, having purchased the position from Viscount Teviot. He was promoted to brigadier-general on 1 January 1704, commanding the dragoons at several distinguished actions, particularly the Battle of Schellenberg where the unit dismounted and helped storm the heights on foot and also Blenheim and Ramillies where the regiment took prisoners of the famous Régiment du Roi and, according to tradition, won the distinction of wearing grenadiers' caps since enjoyed by the regiment.

Hay died on campaign from a lingering fever at Courtrai on 25 Aug. 1706, 'to the regret of the whole army.'

== Personal life ==
Hay married twice; first to Lady Mary Dalzell, the only daughter of James Dalzell, 3rd Earl of Carnwath, by Lady Mary Seton. His second marriage was to Elizabeth, daughter of Sir Charles Orby of Crowland, Lincolnshire. Elizabeth survived him and was later remarried to Major-general Robert Hunter, colonial governor of New York.

== Citations ==
Military offices
Preceded by The Viscount Teviot	Colonel of the Grey Dragoons; 1704–1706	Succeeded by Viscount Dalrymple
