= Typhonium peltandroides =

Scientific classification
- Kingdom: Plantae
- Clade: Embryophytes
- Clade: Tracheophytes
- Clade: Spermatophytes
- Clade: Angiosperms
- Clade: Monocots
- Order: Alismatales
- Family: Araceae
- Genus: Typhonium
- Species: T. peltandroides

Binomial name
- Typhonium peltandroides A.Hay, M.D.Barrett & R.L.Barrett, 1999

Species of flowering plant

Typhonium peltandroides is a species of plant in the arum family that is endemic to Australia.

== Etymology ==
The specific epithet peltandroides alludes to the similarity of the leaf venation to that of the American aroid genus Peltandra.

== Description ==
The species is a deciduous geophytic, perennial herb, which resprouts annually from a hemispherical corm about 5 cm in diameter. The oval leaves are 14–34 cm long by 7–11.7 cm wide, on a 15–50 cm long stalk. The flower is enclosed in a spathe, green on the outside, deep reddish-purple on the inside, appearing in late December and January. Fruiting occurs from mid-January to March.

== Distribution and habitat ==
The species is known only from the tropical Northern Kimberley IBRA bioregion of north-west Western Australia, where the type specimen was collected from Grevillea Gorge in the Synnott Range. There it grows in shallow sandy soil on a sandstone substrate, in rainforest thickets or with Triodia grasses on rock ledges along the sides of the gorge.
