= Typhonium nudibaccatum =

Scientific classification
- Kingdom: Plantae
- Clade: Embryophytes
- Clade: Tracheophytes
- Clade: Spermatophytes
- Clade: Angiosperms
- Clade: Monocots
- Order: Alismatales
- Family: Araceae
- Genus: Typhonium
- Species: T. nudibaccatum

Binomial name
- Typhonium nudibaccatum A.Hay, 1993

Species of flowering plant

Typhonium nudibaccatum is a species of plant in the arum family that is endemic to Australia.

== Description ==
The species is a geophytic, perennial herb, which sprouts from a corm about 2.5 cm in diameter. The leaves are deeply trilobed. The purple, red or black flower is enclosed in a spathe 7–11 cm long, appearing from January to April.

== Distribution and habitat ==
The species occurs on the tropical Mitchell Plateau in the Northern Kimberley IBRA bioregion, in north-western Western Australia, where it is found on lateritic loam soils on basalt substrates on ridges and drainage lines.
