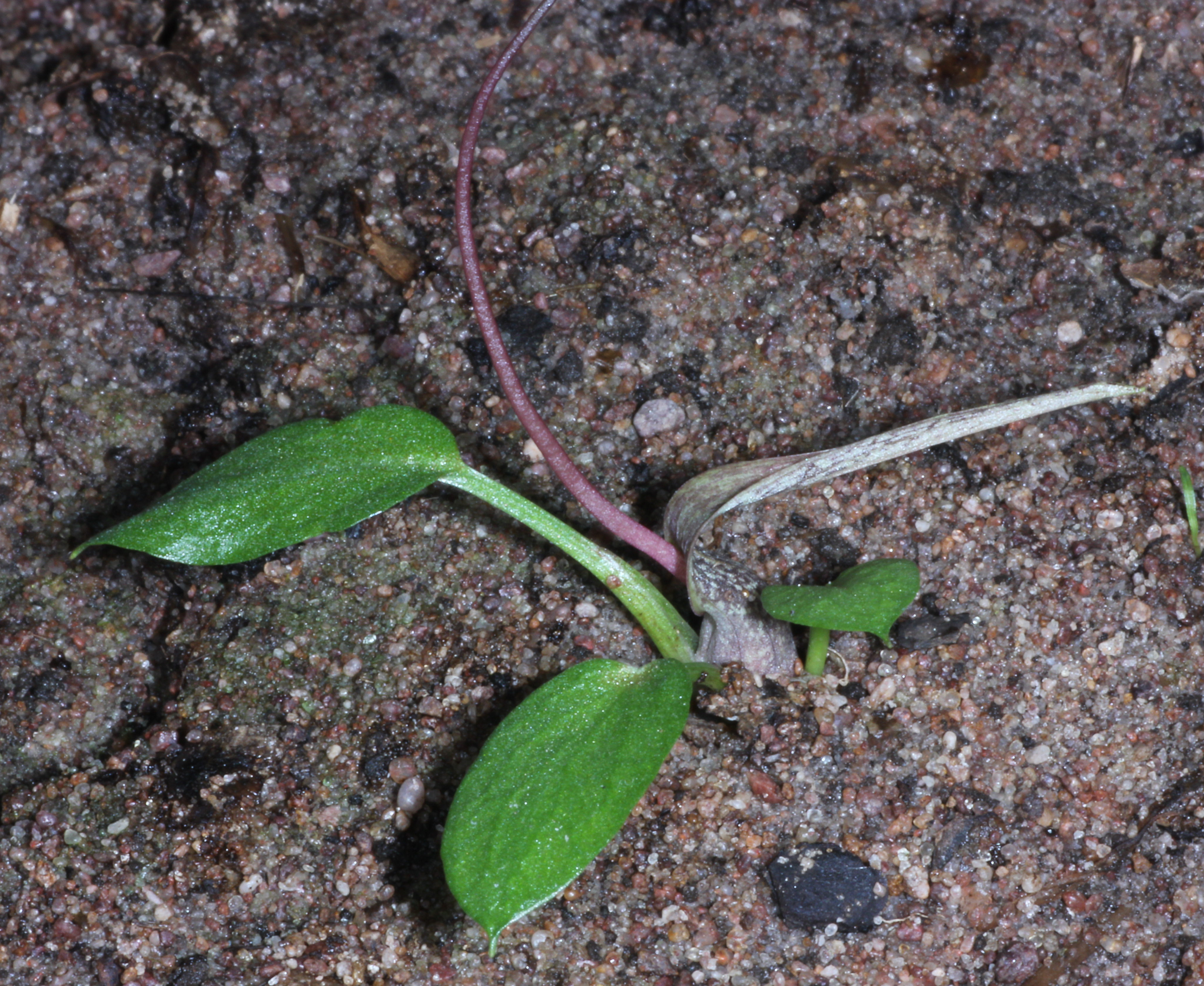
- Typhonium taylorii

Conservation status
- Endangered (EPBC Act)

Scientific classification
- Kingdom: Plantae
- Clade: Embryophytes
- Clade: Tracheophytes
- Clade: Spermatophytes
- Clade: Angiosperms
- Clade: Monocots
- Order: Alismatales
- Family: Araceae
- Genus: Typhonium
- Species: T. taylorii

Binomial name
- Typhonium taylorii A.Hay, 1997

= Typhonium taylorii =

Species of flowering plant

Typhonium taylorii is a species of plant in the arum family that is endemic to Australia.

== Description ==
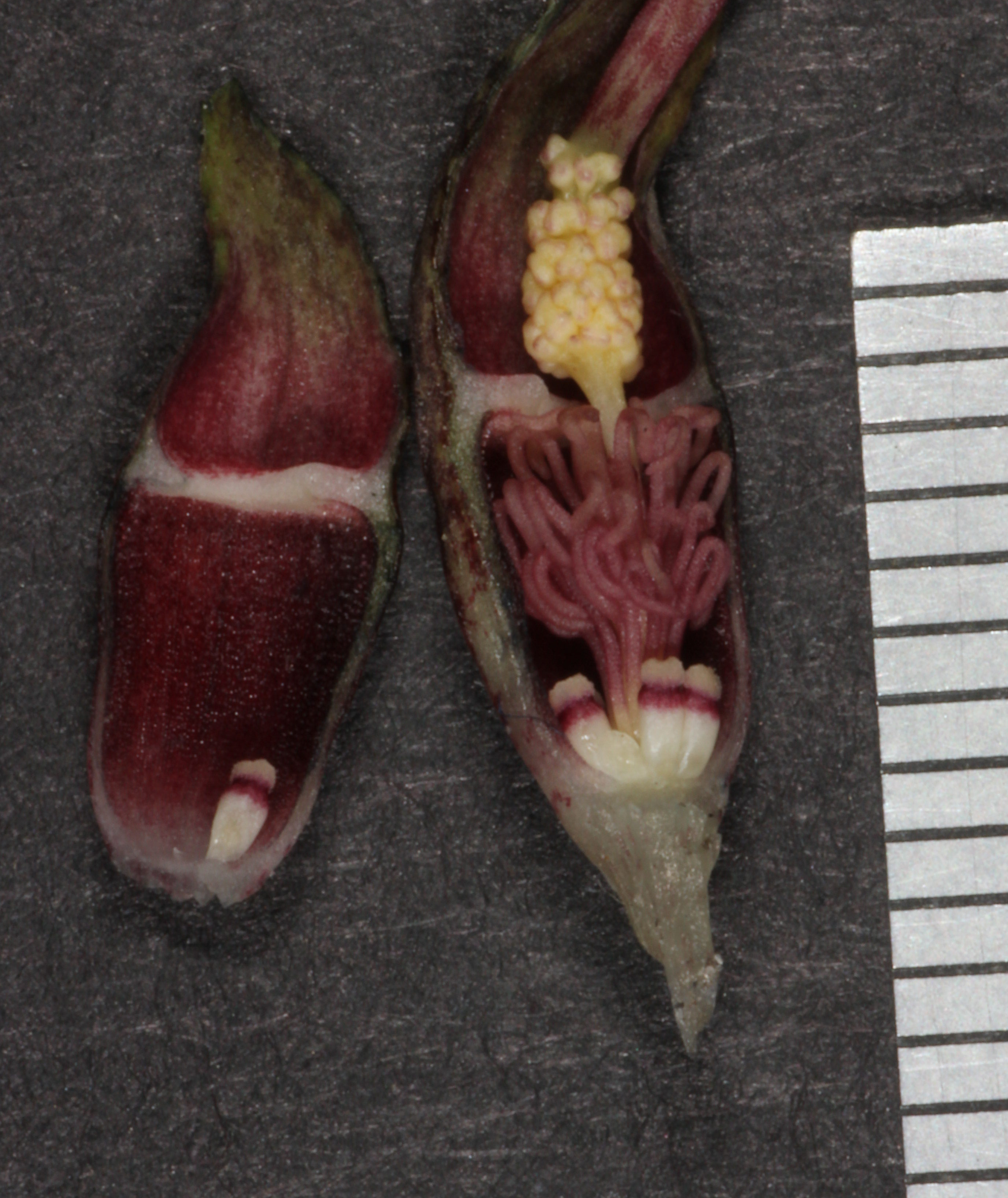
Typhonium taylorii

The species is a small, deciduous, geophytic herb. The leaf is oval, triangular or lanceolate, and about 45 mm long. The flower is enclosed in a spathe 65 mm long, appearing in January.

== Distribution and habitat ==
The species is only known from two locations on the edge of the floodplain of the Howard River, 30 km south-east of Darwin in the Top End of the Northern Territory. It is found on seasonally saturated, nutrient-poor sandy soils with hot wet summers and hot dry winters. Associated vegetation is mainly grassland and sedgeland with scattered Melaleuca viridiflora trees.

== Conservation ==
The species is listed as Endangered under Australia's EPBC Act. The main potential threats include sand mining, vegetation clearance, and hydrological changes due to increased land development and water demand in the region.
