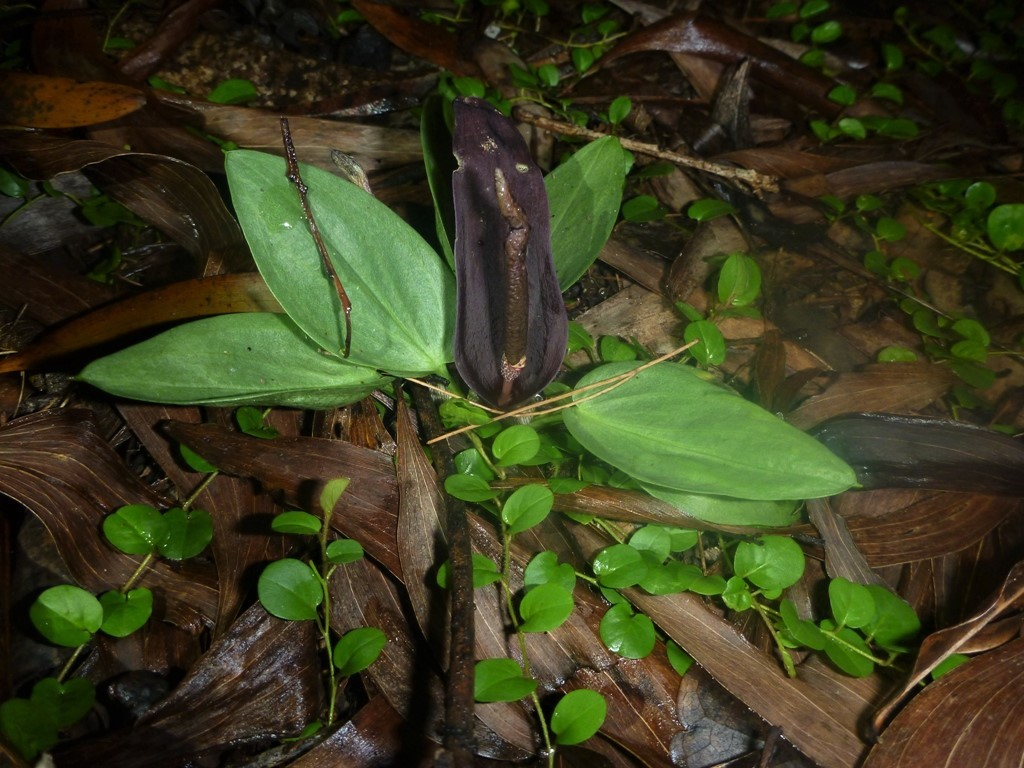

Conservation status
- Vulnerable (IUCN 3.1)

Scientific classification
- Kingdom: Plantae
- Clade: Embryophytes
- Clade: Tracheophytes
- Clade: Spermatophytes
- Clade: Angiosperms
- Clade: Monocots
- Order: Alismatales
- Family: Araceae
- Genus: Typhonium
- Species: T. johnsonianum

Binomial name
- Typhonium johnsonianum A.Hay & S.Taylor, 1996

= Typhonium johnsonianum =

Species of flowering plant

Typhonium johnsonianum is a species of plant in the arum family that is endemic to the Northern Territory of Australia.

== Description ==
The species is a deciduous geophytic, perennial herb, which resprouts annually from a hemispherical, cream-coloured corm. The oval, dull light green leaves are 3.5 cm long by 1.7 cm wide, on a 4 cm long stalk. The flower is enclosed in a green, brown and maroon spathe 5 cm long, appearing in December.

It was named after Australian botanist L.A.S. Johnson after his 70th birthday.

== Distribution and habitat ==
The species is only known from the tropical Top End of the Northern Territory. Only two localities are known, at Black Jungle Conservation Reserve and in Kakadu National Park.

The type locality is an open grassy clearing between Acacia auriculiformis / Melaleuca forest and Lophostemon lactifluus forest, near the edge of a floodplain, in well-drained sandy soil with a high water table during the wet season.

== Conservation status ==
NT Flora lists the species as "data deficient". IUCN (2013) lists it as "vulnerable".
