= Typhonium wilbertii =

Scientific classification
- Kingdom: Plantae
- Clade: Embryophytes
- Clade: Tracheophytes
- Clade: Spermatophytes
- Clade: Angiosperms
- Clade: Monocots
- Order: Alismatales
- Family: Araceae
- Genus: Typhonium
- Species: T. wilbertii

Binomial name
- Typhonium wilbertii A.Hay, 1993

Species of flowering plant

Typhonium wilbertii is a species of plant in the arum family that is endemic to Australia.

== Etymology ==
The specific epithet wilbertii honours Dutch botanist Wilbert Hetterscheid.

== Description ==
The species is a deciduous, geophytic, perennial herb, which resprouts annually from a corm 3–4 cm in diameter. The greyish-green leaves are usually trilobed and 13–28 cm by 17–30 cm. The flower is enclosed in a green spathe about 13 cm long. The fruits are orange berries.

== Distribution and habitat ==
The species occurs on the tropical Cape York Peninsula of Far North Queensland. It is found on the edges of notophyll rainforest on mudstone soils at elevations of 90–150 m.
