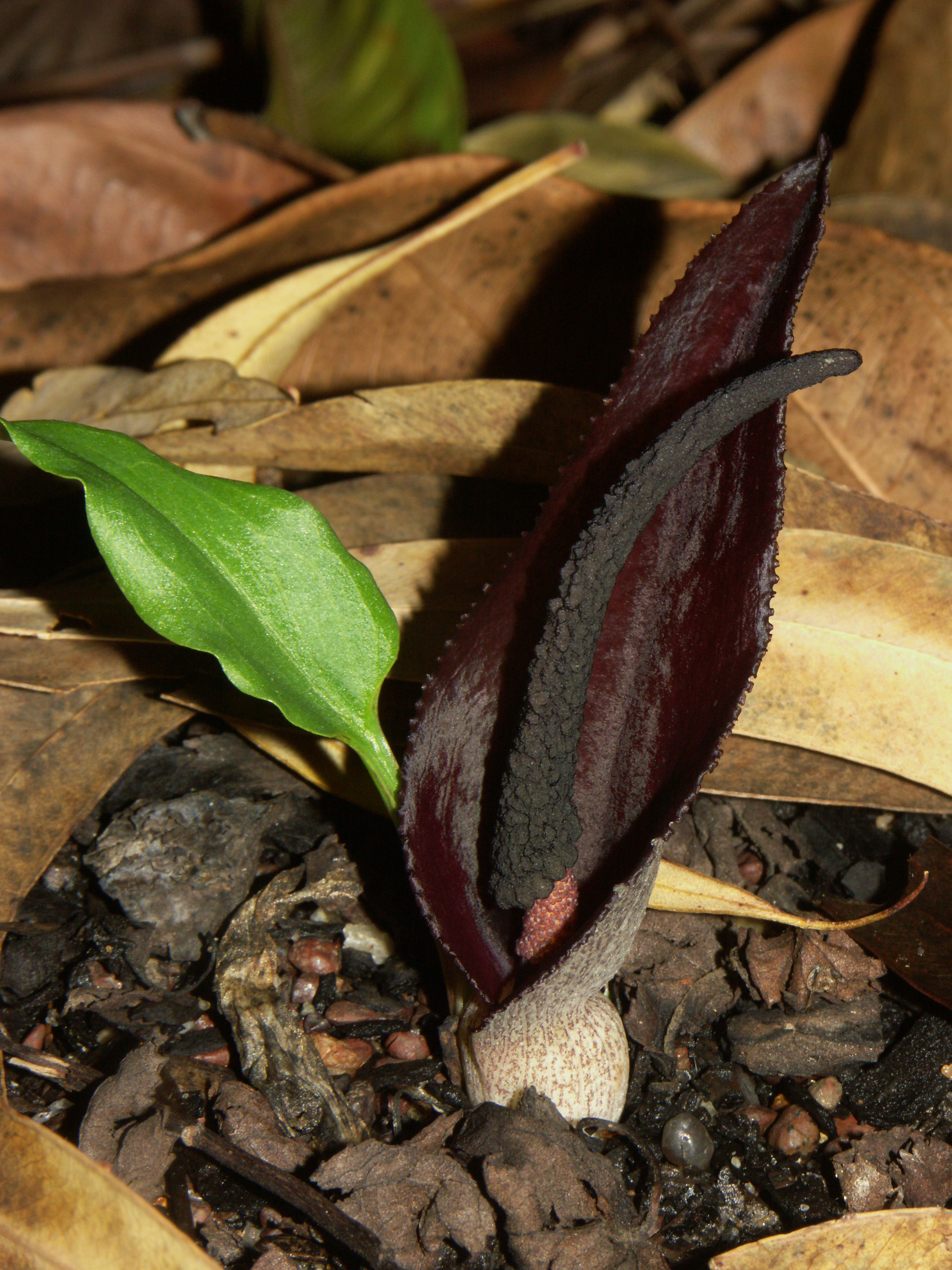
- Typhonium praetermissu, NT Herbarium

Scientific classification
- Kingdom: Plantae
- Clade: Embryophytes
- Clade: Tracheophytes
- Clade: Spermatophytes
- Clade: Angiosperms
- Clade: Monocots
- Order: Alismatales
- Family: Araceae
- Genus: Typhonium
- Species: T. praetermissum

Binomial name
- Typhonium praetermissum A.Hay, 1997

Synonyms
- Lazarum praetermissum

= Typhonium praetermissum =

Species of flowering plant

Typhonium praetermissum is a species of plant in the arum family that is endemic to the Northern Territory of Australia. In 2022, Hay and others resurrected the genus, Lazarum, and renamed the species as Lazarum praetermissum (a name accepted by Plants of the World Online).

== Description ==
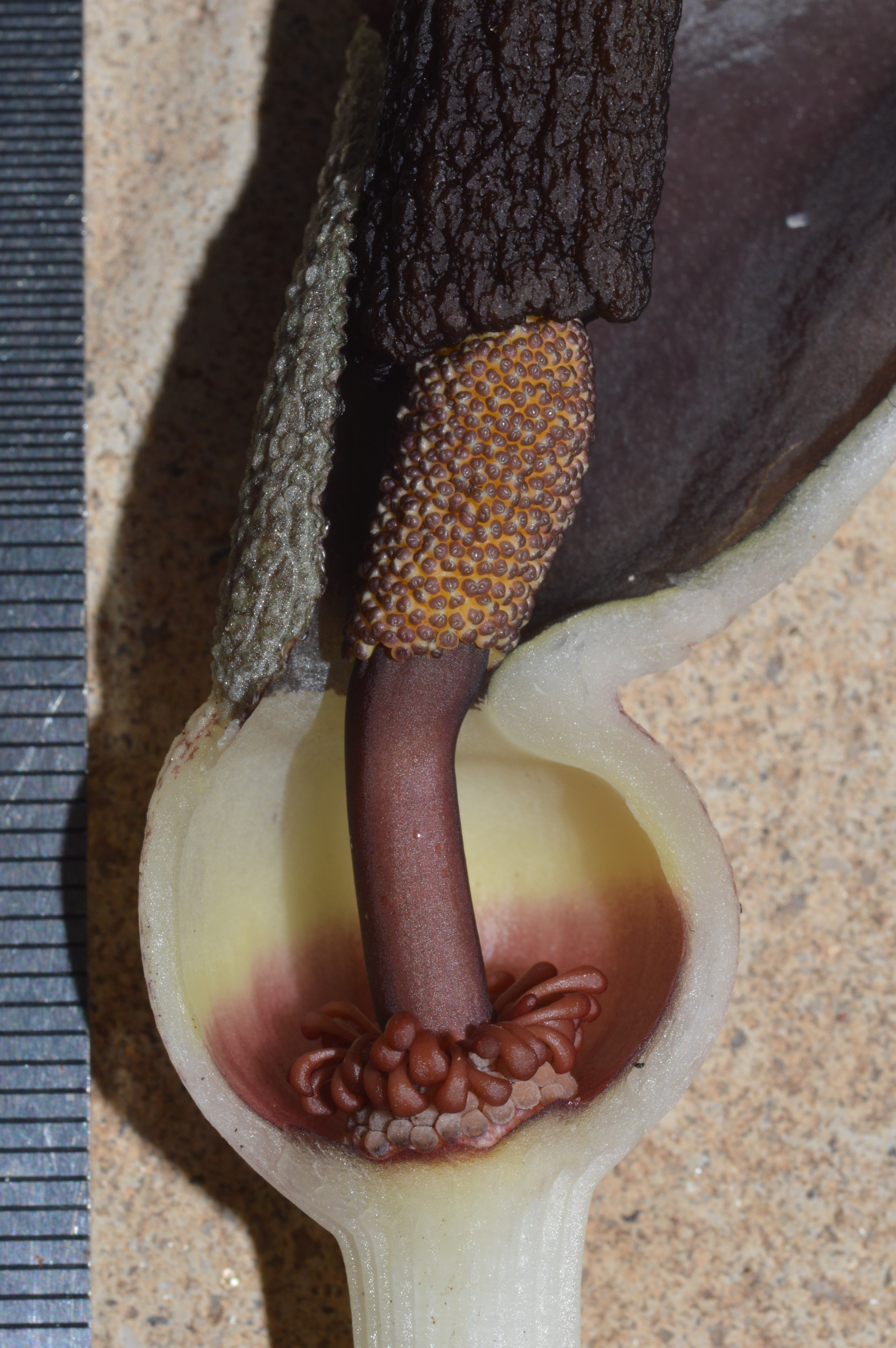
Flower of the Typhonium praetermissum, NT Herbarium

The species is a geophytic, perennial herb, which resprouts annually from a corm. The leaves vary from oval in shape to deeply divided, up to 4.5 cm long, on a stalk up to 5.5 cm long. The flower is enclosed in a brown and maroon spathe 4 cm long. The small fruits appear in November and December.

== Distribution and habitat ==
The species occurs in the tropical Top End of the Northern Territory, with a range limited to the vicinity of Darwin and the Litchfield shire including Middle Arm, Virginia, Karama, Noonamah, the Palmerston escarpment and Mandorah. Many sub-populations are under increasing pressure from development and weed incursion.

It is found mainly in open woodland habitats with red-brown clay or lateritic soils, typically in Eucalyptus miniata woodland on well drained soils, and on the margins of plateaus.

== Conservation status ==
NT Flora lists the species as "vulnerable".
