= Typhonium weipanum =

Scientific classification
- Kingdom: Plantae
- Clade: Embryophytes
- Clade: Tracheophytes
- Clade: Spermatophytes
- Clade: Angiosperms
- Clade: Monocots
- Order: Alismatales
- Family: Araceae
- Genus: Typhonium
- Species: T. weipanum

Binomial name
- Typhonium weipanum A.Hay, 1993

Species of flowering plant

Typhonium weipanum is a species of plant in the arum family that is endemic to Australia.

== Etymology ==
The specific epithet weipanum refers to the type locality.

== Description ==
The species is a deciduous, geophytic, perennial herb, which sprouts from a tuberous rhizome 2 cm in diameter. The leaves are trilobed. The flower is enclosed in a purple spathe about 9.5 cm long.

== Distribution and habitat ==
The species is known only from the vicinity of Weipa, on the tropical Cape York Peninsula of Far North Queensland, where it is found on the edge of open Eucalyptus tetrodonta woodland.
