= Typhonium mirabile =

Scientific classification
- Kingdom: Plantae
- Clade: Embryophytes
- Clade: Tracheophytes
- Clade: Spermatophytes
- Clade: Angiosperms
- Clade: Monocots
- Order: Alismatales
- Family: Araceae
- Genus: Typhonium
- Species: T. mirabile

Binomial name
- Typhonium mirabile (A.Hay) A.Hay

Synonyms
- Lazarum mirabile A.Hay

Species of flowering plant

Typhonium mirabile is a species of flowering plant in the family Araceae. It is found growing in Australia in eucalypts woodlands at the base of Cycas plants. It was first described in 1992 by Alistair Hay, as Lazarum mirabile and was the only species in the genus Lazarum. In 1997, Hay published a paper transferring it to the genus Typhonium.
