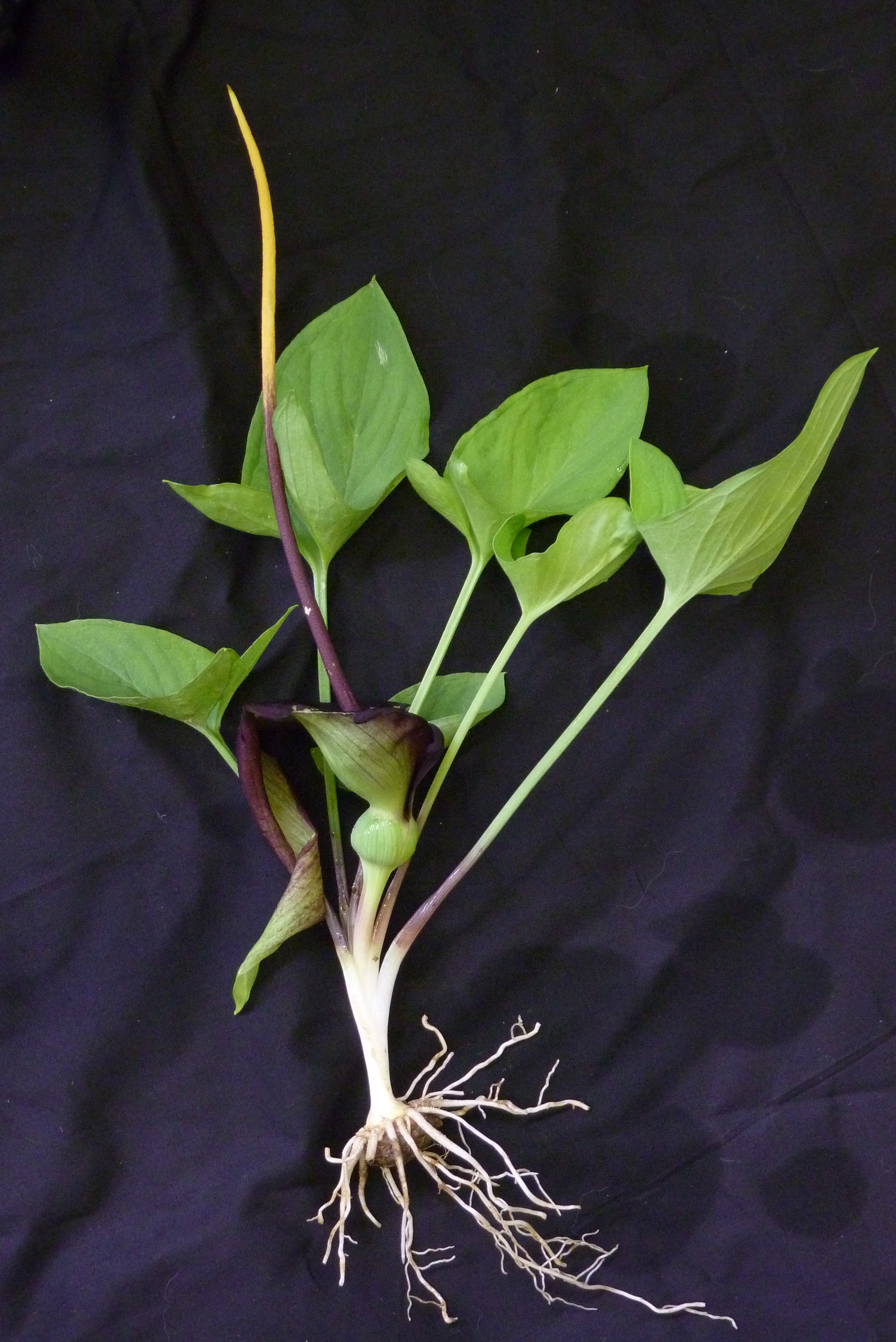

Scientific classification
- Kingdom: Plantae
- Clade: Embryophytes
- Clade: Tracheophytes
- Clade: Spermatophytes
- Clade: Angiosperms
- Clade: Monocots
- Order: Alismatales
- Family: Araceae
- Genus: Typhonium
- Species: T. cochleare

Binomial name
- Typhonium cochleare A.Hay, 1993

= Typhonium cochleare =

Species of flowering plant

Typhonium cochleare is a species of plant in the arum family that is native to Australia.

== Description ==
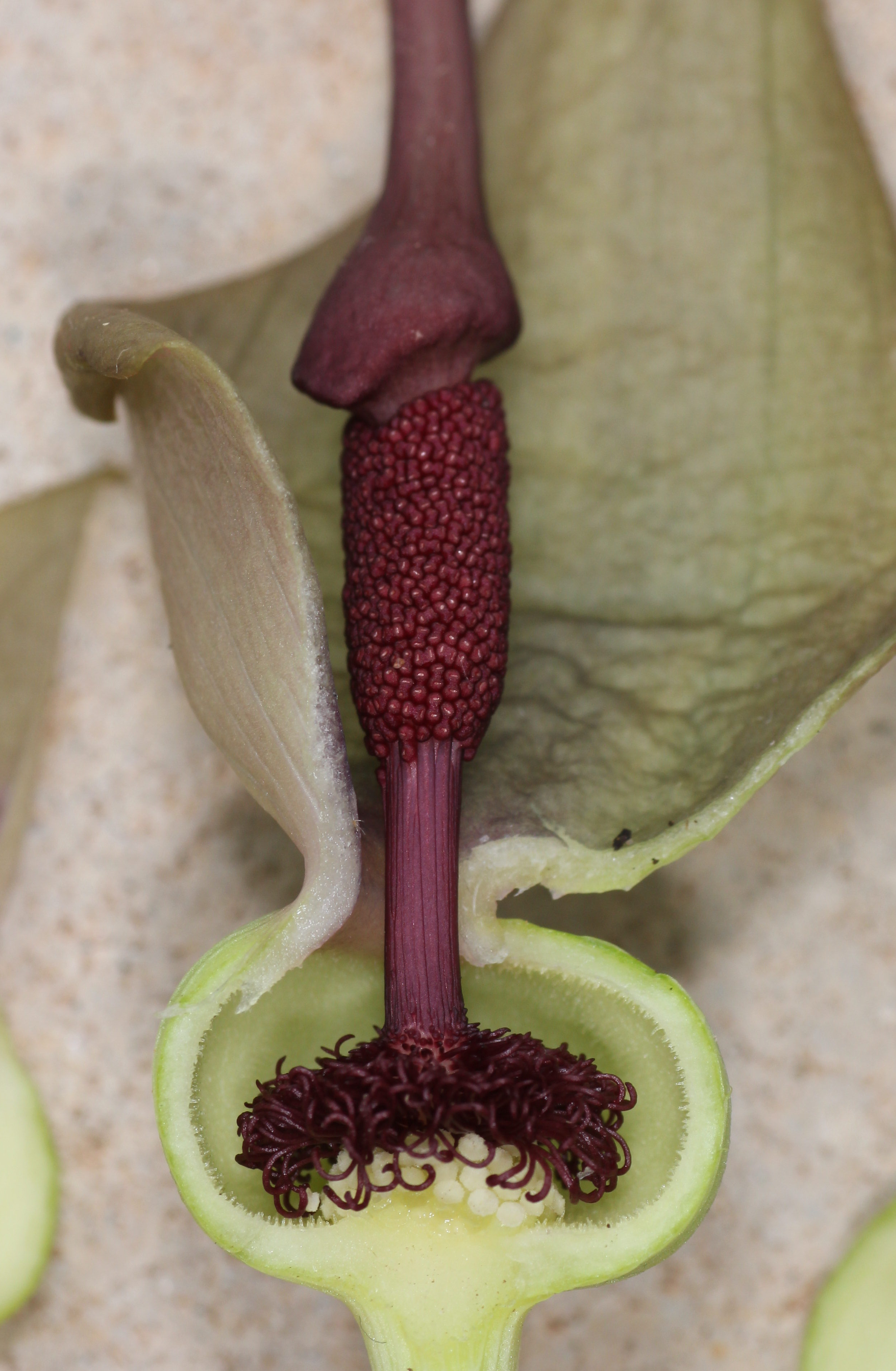
Flower of the Typhonium cochleare

The species is a geophytic, perennial herb, which sprouts from a corm about 2 cm in diameter. The leaves are very variable in shape. The flower is enclosed in a spathe about 17 cm long.

== Distribution and habitat ==
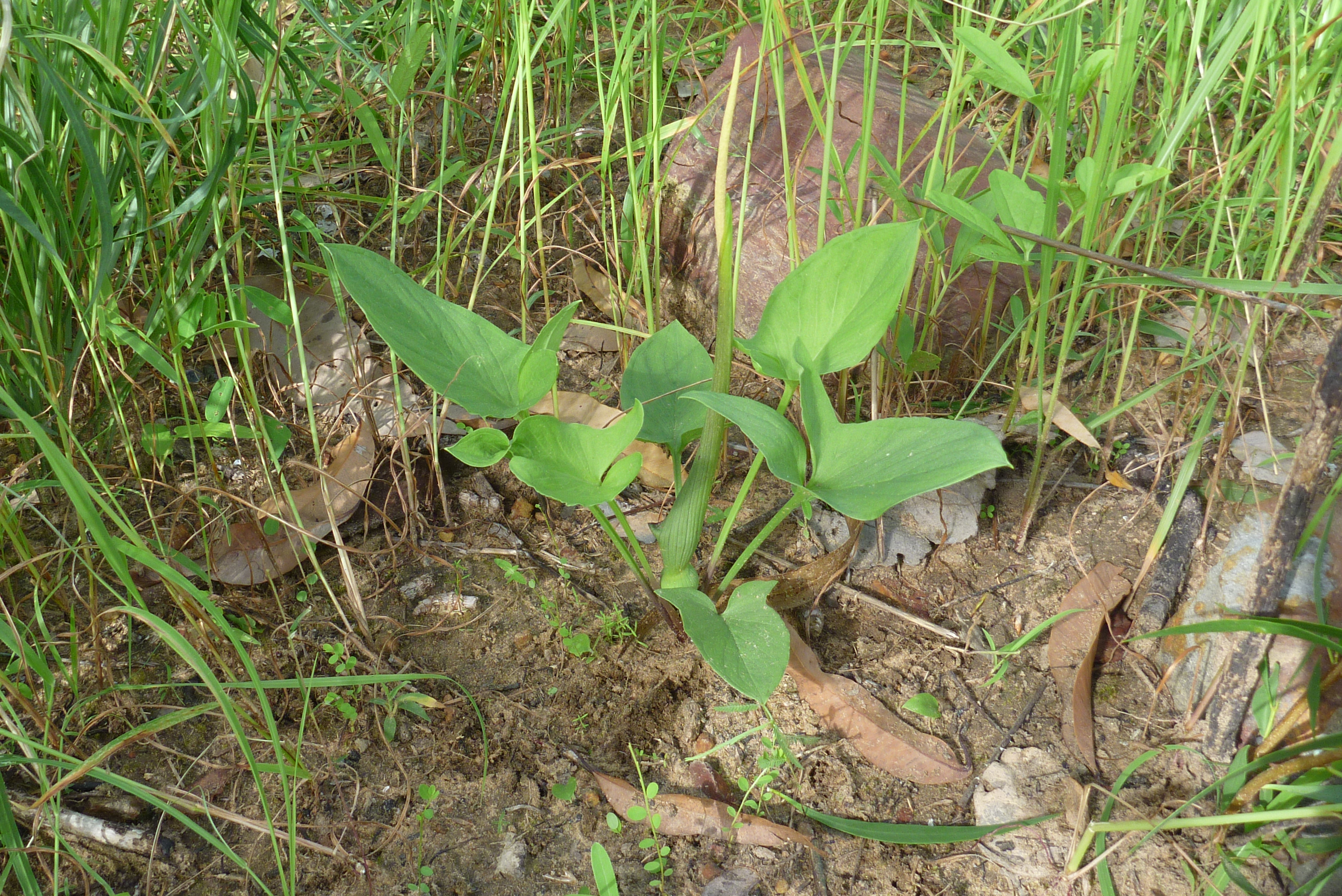
Typhonium cochleare

The species occurs in the tropical Top End of the Northern Territory from Darwin to Arnhemland, mainly in open forest.
