= Typhonium russell-smithii =

Scientific classification
- Kingdom: Plantae
- Clade: Embryophytes
- Clade: Tracheophytes
- Clade: Spermatophytes
- Clade: Angiosperms
- Clade: Monocots
- Order: Alismatales
- Family: Araceae
- Genus: Typhonium
- Species: T. russell-smithii

Binomial name
- Typhonium russell-smithii A.Hay, 1993

Species of flowering plant

Typhonium russell-smithii is a species of plant in the arum family that is endemic to Australia.

== Etymology ==
The specific epithet russell-smithii honours ecologist Jeremy Russell-Smith for his contributions to the knowledge of the flora and vegetation of the Top End of the Northern Territory.

== Description ==
The species is a deciduous, geophytic, perennial herb, which sprouts from a corm about 3 cm in diameter. The leaves are deeply and narrowly trilobed. The flower is enclosed in a spathe about 6.5 cm long.

== Distribution and habitat ==
The species is known only from Cannon Hill in Kakadu National Park, in the tropical Top End of the Northern Territory, where the type collection came from sandy colluvial soils in eucalypt forest at the base of the Kakadu escarpment.
