= Iris Dawnay =

British aristocrat and MI6 secretary

The Honourable Iris Dawnay LVO
- Born: Iris Irene Adele Peake; 23 July 1923; London, United Kingdom
- Died: 18 November 2021 (aged 98)
- Spouse: Oliver Dawnay (m. 1963; died 1988)
- Children: 1
- Father: Osbert Peake, 1st Viscount Ingleby

Iris Irene Adele Dawnay LVO (née Peake; 23 July 1923 – 18 November 2021) was a British aristocrat who worked as a MI6 secretary and was a lady-in-waiting to Princess Margaret.

== Early life and family ==
Dawnay was born Iris Irene Adele Peake on 23 July 1923 in London. She was the eldest child of Osbert Peake, a barrister and politician who was later created Viscount Ingleby, and Lady Joan Rachel de Vere Capell (1899–1979), youngest daughter of the 7th Earl and Countess of Essex. She was raised in London and at the Peake's family seat, Snilesworth Lodge, near Osmotherley, North Yorkshire. Her younger sister Sonia (1924–2009) married the 13th Marquess of Tweeddale.

She was educated at Miss Faunce's Parents' National Educational Union school in Bayswater and at Mrs Fife's, a boarding school in Cambridgeshire.

== Career ==
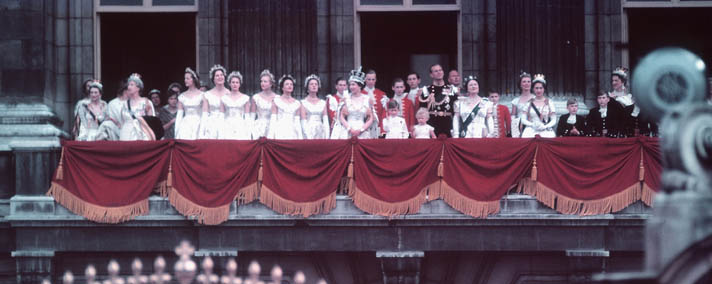
Dawnay on the balcony of Buckingham Palace following Elizabeth II's coronation on 2 June 1953. She can be seen fifth from right, behind Princess Margaret.

Dawnay completed a secretarial course and was recruited by a family friend to work as a secretary for MI6 at Bletchley Park during World War II. Her work was to make copies of secret documents which she later revealed may have pertained to the atomic bomb. After the war, she was posted by MI6 to The Hague.

After the war, she worked for the Conservative Research Department before being scouted as a lady-in-waiting to Princess Margaret in December 1951. Her appointment was gazetted on 11 January 1952. One month after her appointment, George VI died and she moved with Princess Margaret and the Queen Mother from Buckingham Palace to Clarence House.

In June 1953, Dawnay carried Princess Margaret's train in the procession at the coronation of Elizabeth II. Following the coronation, she appeared on the balcony of Buckingham Palace with the royal family and other attendants. After the coronation, the press became aware of Princess Margaret's relationship with Group Captain Peter Townsend. Dawnay supported the princess throughout, and when Townsend was posted to Brussels, he posted his letters to Margaret to Dawnay's flat in Belgravia, rather than Clarence House where they might be intercepted.

She accompanied the princess on tours of the Caribbean, Canada, Southern Rhodesia and Mauritius. She was involved in making arrangements for Margaret's wedding to Antony Armstrong-Jones in 1960. For her royal service, Dawnay was appointed a Member, Fourth Class (now Lieutenant) of the Royal Victorian Order in the 1957 Birthday Honours.

Dawnay relinquished her appointment in July 1962 but remained as an extra lady-in-waiting until March 1963.

== Personal life ==
Before her marriage, Dawnay had a brief relationship with George Blake, a double agent who later defected to the Soviet Union.

In 1963, she married Captain Oliver Payan Dawnay, a divorcé with three children who had been the Queen Mother's private secretary. They had a daughter of their own, Emma (born 1964). She was widowed in 1988. In later life, her companion was Sir John Beith, former Ambassador to Belgium.

Dawnay died on 18 November 2021, aged 98. Her funeral was held on 8 December at St Michael's Church, Tidcombe, Wiltshire.
