= Typhonium jonesii =

Conservation status
- Endangered (EPBC Act)

Scientific classification
- Kingdom: Plantae
- Clade: Embryophytes
- Clade: Tracheophytes
- Clade: Spermatophytes
- Clade: Angiosperms
- Clade: Monocots
- Order: Alismatales
- Family: Araceae
- Genus: Typhonium
- Species: T. jonesii

Binomial name
- Typhonium jonesii A.Hay, 1993

Species of flowering plant

Typhonium jonesii is a species of plant in the arum family that is endemic to Australia.

== Etymology ==
The specific epithet jonesii honours Australian botanist David L. Jones who made valuable collections of Typhonium species in the Northern Territory in 1984.

== Description ==
The species is a small, deciduous, geophytic, perennial herb, which resprouts annually from a corm about 2.5 cm in diameter. The leaf is deeply trilobed. The flower is enclosed in a pale mauve-cream spathe, appearing in December.

== Distribution and habitat ==
The species is only known from the Tiwi Islands, off the northern coast of the tropical Top End of the Northern Territory. It is found in eucalypt woodland and rainforest on rocky hills and in plantations.

== Conservation ==
The species is listed as Endangered under Australia's EPBC Act. The main potential threats include land clearing for forestry, habitat disturbance by feral animals such as water buffalos, horses, pigs and cattle, weed invasion by mission grass and gamba grass, and inappropriate fire regimes.
