= Typhonium liliifolium =

Scientific classification
- Kingdom: Plantae
- Clade: Embryophytes
- Clade: Tracheophytes
- Clade: Spermatophytes
- Clade: Angiosperms
- Clade: Monocots
- Order: Alismatales
- Family: Araceae
- Genus: Typhonium
- Species: T. liliifolium

Binomial name
- Typhonium liliifolium F.Muell. ex Schott, 1860

Species of flowering plant

Typhonium liliifolium is a species of plant in the arum family that is endemic to Australia.

== Description ==
The species is a deciduous geophytic, perennial herb, which resprouts annually from a corm 5 cm in diameter. The narrowly lanceolate leaves, up to 30 cm long by 3–8 cm wide, are borne on stalks up to 30 cm long. The flower is enclosed in a 10–24 cm long spathe.

== Distribution and habitat ==
The species is known from the tropical Northern Kimberley region of north-west Western Australia, as well as the Victoria River area of the Top End of the Northern Territory, where it grows in savanna woodland and open scrub.
