= Adele Capell, Countess of Essex =

American-born socialite

The Right Honourable The Countess of Essex
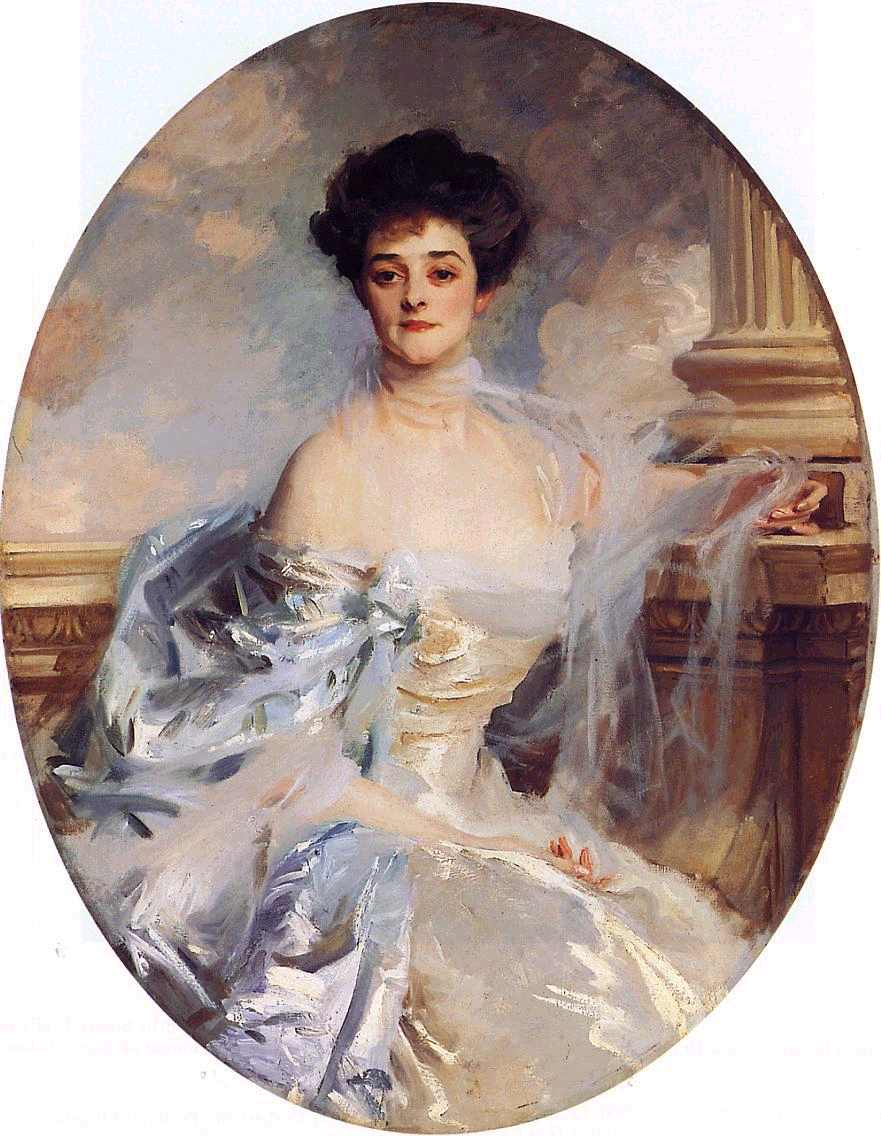
- The Countess of Essex, by John Singer Sargent, 1906

Personal details
- Born: Adele Beach Grant; 9 December 1866 New York City, New York, U.S.
- Died: 28 July 1922 (aged 55) London, England
- Spouse: George Capell, 7th Earl of Essex (m. 1893; died 1916)
- Children: Lady Iris Mary Athenais de Vere Capell; Lady Joan Rachel de Vere Capell
- Parent: David Beach Grant; Rebecca Douglas Stewart Grant
- Relatives: Martin Peake, 2nd Viscount Ingleby (grandson)

Adele Beach Capell, Countess of Essex (née Adele Beach Grant; 9 December 1866 – 28 July 1922) was an American-born socialite who married into the British nobility. She was also a vegetarianism activist.

== Early life ==
She was born in New York City on 9 December 1866. She was a daughter of Rebecca Douglas (née Stewart) Grant (1835–1917) and David Beach Grant (1839–1888) of the Grant Locomotive Works. Her sister was Edythe Scott Grant, who married Viscount Gaston Charles de Breteuil in 1904. Along with her sister, Adele was the co-heiress to her uncle R. Suydam Grant, who gave her away at her wedding.

A society beauty, she was one of the so-called 'Lovely Five' along with the Duchess of Sutherland, the Countess of Westmorland, the Countess of Lytton, and the Countess of Warwick.

== Personal life ==
Adele was engaged to Lord Cairns, but broke off the engagement on the eve of their wedding "owing to the prospective bridegroom's extortionate demands for a settlement."

She married George Capell, 7th Earl of Essex, at St Margaret's, Westminster on 14 December 1893. The service was carried out by Archdeacon Farrar, and Sir Arthur Sullivan played the organ. The Earl and Countess lived at Cassiobury Park, Watford. The couple had two daughters:

- Lady Iris Mary Athenais de Vere Capell (1895–1977), who died unmarried.
- Lady Joan Rachel de Vere Capell (1899–1979), who married Osbert Peake, 1st Viscount Ingleby in 1922.

In 1902, the Earl purchased a Cartier diamond tiara, known as the 'Essex Tiara' for the Countess. The same tiara was later worn by Clementine Churchill at the 1953 Coronation.

In World War I, the Countess supported the war effort, working with Queen Mary's Needlework Guild, the Urban Council for War Relief and as President of the Soldiers' and Sailors' Families Association.

After the Earl's death, in 1916, Adele was rumoured to be engaged to the Duke of Connaught (a younger brother of King Edward VII, who became widowed himself in March 1917). However, she never remarried. In 1920, Adele and her stepson, Algernon Capell, 8th Earl of Essex, sold off Cassiobury Park and its contents.

=== Vegetarianism ===
Adele became a vegetarian in 1904 which she attributed to regaining her beauty. She was a member of the London Society of Vegetarians and embraced a unique form of exercise that involved balancing and lifting pumpkins.

=== Death ===
Adele lived as the Dowager Countess of Essex at her London home, 72 Brook Street, Mayfair, where she died, aged 55, on 28 July 1922. Adele was found dead in the bath by her maid. She suffered from heart affection and it was suggested that whilst taking her bath she had a fatal seizure. A memorial service was held at St Margaret's, Westminster among whom Arthur Balfour and Winston Churchill attended. She was cremated at Golders Green Crematorium.

=== Legacy ===
She was the model for Hubert von Herkomer's portrait, 'Lady in White', and an 1892 portrait by Edward Hughes.

A portrait of Adele Capell by the English painter Edward Robert Hughes hangs in the Watford Museum.

Another portrait, painted in 1906 by the American painter John Singer Sargent and entitled The Countess of Essex, currently hangs in The Museum of Fine Arts-Houston. It is privately owned, and on long-term loan to the museum.

== Gallery ==
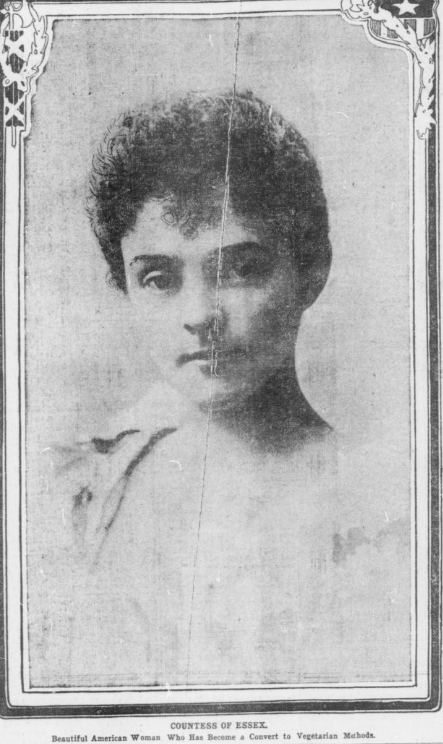
Adele in 1904

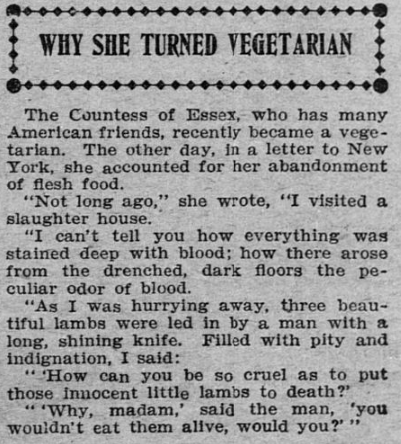
Adele Capell convert to vegetarianism
