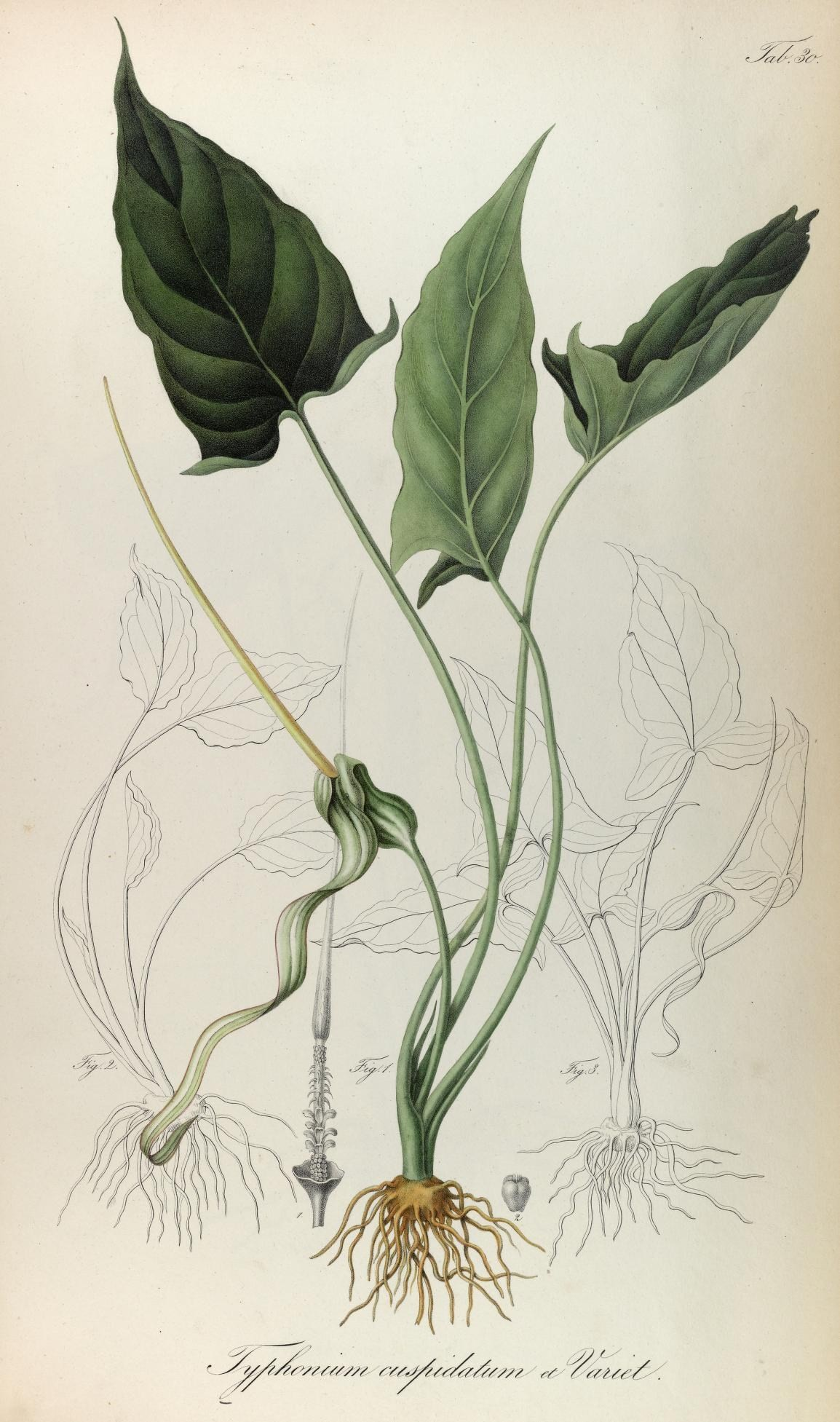

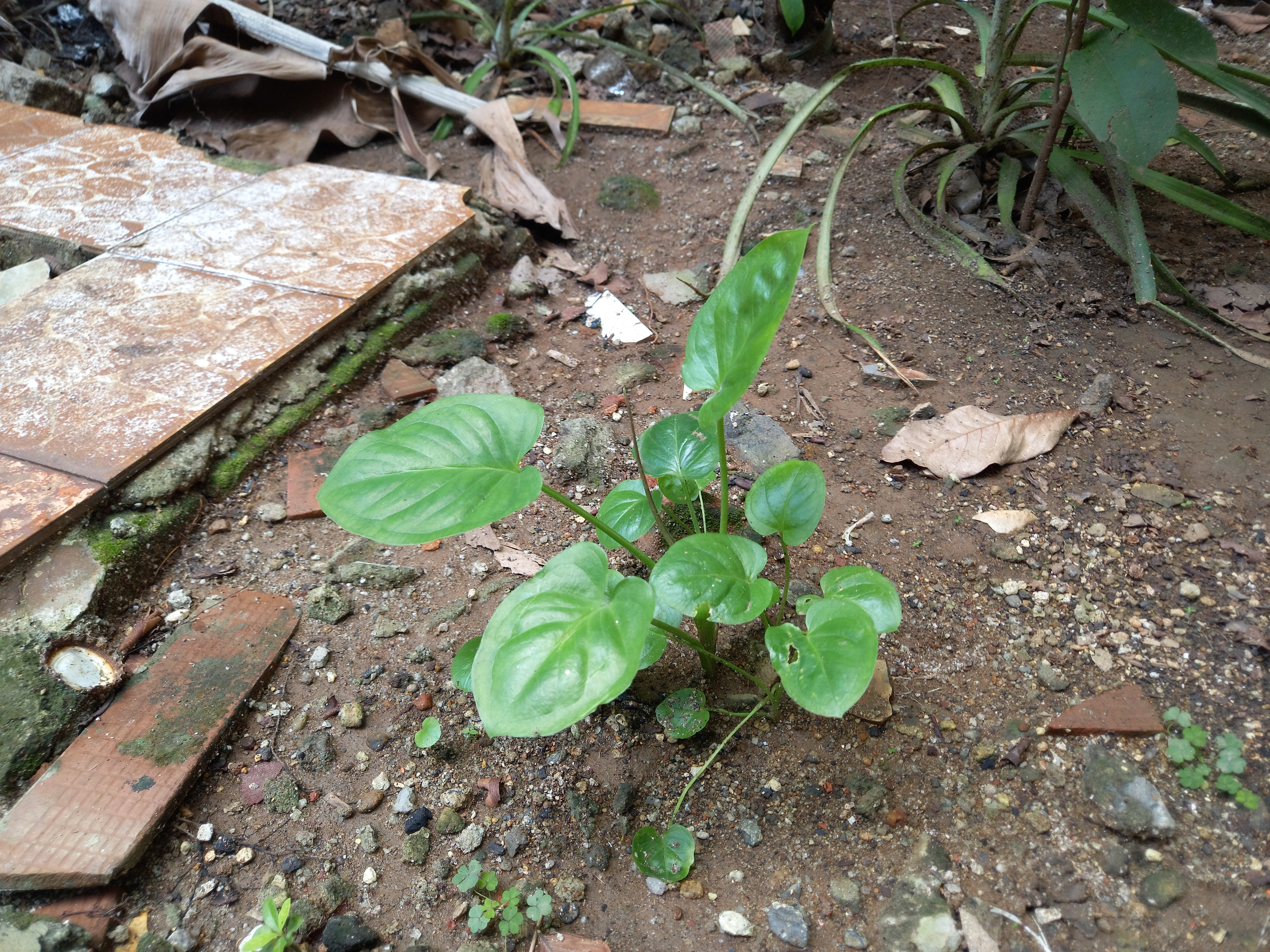

Conservation status
- Least Concern (IUCN 3.1)

Scientific classification
- Kingdom: Plantae
- Clade: Tracheophytes
- Clade: Angiosperms
- Clade: Monocots
- Order: Alismatales
- Family: Araceae
- Genus: Typhonium
- Species: T. flagelliforme

Binomial name
- Typhonium flagelliforme (G.Lodd.) Blume

Synonyms
- Arum flagelliforme G.Lodd.; Heterostalis flagelliformis (G.Lodd.) Schott; Arum divaricatum L.; Arum cuspidatum Blume; Typhonium cuspidatum (Blume) Decne.; Arum ptychiurum Zipp. ex Kunth; Typhonium sylvaticum Voigt; Arum angulatum Griff.; Arum flagelliferum Griff.; Typhonium flagelliferum Griff.; Typhonium hastiferum Miq.; Typhonium reinwardtianum de Vriese & Miq.; Typhonium incurvatum Blatt. & McCann

= Typhonium flagelliforme =

Species of flowering plant

Typhonium flagelliforme is a species of flowering plant in the family Araceae.

Typhonium flagelliforme is native to China (Guangdong, Guangxi, Yunnan), Bangladesh, Bhutan, Cambodia, India, Indonesia, Laos, Malaysia, Myanmar, Philippines, Singapore, Sri Lanka, Thailand, New Guinea, Australia (Queensland, Northern Territory).
