= Osbert Peake, 1st Viscount Ingleby =

British peer and politician (1897–1966)

The Right Honourable The Viscount Ingleby PC

Minister of Pensions and National Insurance Minister of National Insurance (1951–1953)
- In office 31 October 1951 – 20 December 1955
- Prime Minister: Winston Churchill; Anthony Eden
- Preceded by: Edith Summerskill
- Succeeded by: John Boyd-Carpenter

Financial Secretary to the Treasury
- In office 1944–1945
- Preceded by: Ralph Assheton
- Succeeded by: Glenvil Hall

Personal details
- Born: 30 December 1897
- Died: 11 October 1966 (aged 68) Osmotherley, North Yorkshire, England
- Party: Conservative
- Spouse: Lady Joan Rachel de Vere Capell (m. 1922)
- Education: Eton College; Royal Military College, Sandhurst; Christ Church, Oxford
- Occupation: Politician

Osbert Peake, 1st Viscount Ingleby, PC (30 December 1897 – 11 October 1966), was a British Conservative Party politician. He served as Minister of National Insurance and then as Minister of Pensions and National Insurance from 1951 to 1955.

== Early life ==
Peake was educated at Eton before training at the Royal Military College, Sandhurst. He served with the Coldstream Guards during the First World War, before joining the Sherwood Rangers Yeomanry.

He entered Christ Church, Oxford in 1919 and graduated in history in 1921. In 1923 he was called to the bar at the Inner Temple.

== Career ==
After unsuccessfully contesting Dewsbury in 1922, Peake entered Parliament as Member of Parliament (MP) for Leeds North in 1929.

In April 1939, he was appointed as Parliamentary Under-Secretary of State for the Home Department and in October 1944 he became Financial Secretary to the Treasury. Whilst in opposition, he became a leading spokesman for the Beveridge social reform proposals, and on the Conservatives return to power in 1951 he became Minister of National Insurance (Minister of Pensions and National Insurance from September 1953 and a member of the Cabinet from October 1954).

In December 1955, shortly after Anthony Eden succeeded Winston Churchill as Prime Minister in April, Peake resigned from the government.

== Personal life ==
On 19 June 1922 Peake married Lady Joan Rachel de Vere Capell, younger daughter of George Capell, 7th Earl of Essex and Adele Capell, Countess of Essex. They had five children:

- Hon Iris Irene Adele Peake, MVO (25 July 1923 - 18 November 2021), a lady-in-waiting to Princess Margaret from 1952 to 1963, married Captain Oliver Payan Dawnay, CVO in 1963.
- Hon Sonia Mary Peake (12 December 1924 - 30 July 2009), married David Hay, 12th Marquess of Tweeddale, mother of twin sons Edward Hay, 13th Marquess of Tweeddale and David Hay, 14th Marquess of Tweeddale.
- Martin Raymond Peake, 2nd (and last) Viscount Ingleby (31 May 1926 - 14 October 2008)
- Imogen Clarissa Peake (18 January 1934 - 29 October 1937)
- Hon Mary Rose Peake (born 23 April 1940), married Everard John Robert March Phillipps de Lisle.

== Honours ==
Peake became a Privy Counsellor in 1943 and was raised to the peerage on 17 January 1956 as Viscount Ingleby, of Snilesworth in the North Riding of the County of York.

== Death ==
Lord Ingleby died in 1966 at the age of 68. He was succeeded in the viscountcy by his only son, Martin.

== Arms ==
Coat of arms of Osbert Peake, 1st Viscount Ingleby
Coronet Coronet of a viscount Crest A Heart Gules between two Wings displayed Erminois Escutcheon Sable three Crosses patée Argent within an Orle of eight Fleur-de-lys and a Bordure Or Supporters On either side a Blackfaced Swaledale Ram proper holding in the mouth a Rose Argent barbed seeded slipped and leaved also proper Motto Quae Supra Quaerenda (What is on high is worth seeking)

== Footnotes ==
Parliament of the United Kingdom
Preceded by Sir Gervase Beckett, Bt.	Member of Parliament for Leeds North; 1929 – 1955	Constituency abolished
Preceded by Alice Bacon	Member of Parliament for Leeds North East; 1955 – 1956	Succeeded by Keith Joseph
Political offices
Preceded by Geoffrey Lloyd	Parliamentary Under-Secretary of State for the Home Department; 1939–1944	Succeeded by The Earl of Munster
Preceded by Ralph Assheton	Financial Secretary to the Treasury; 1944–1945	Succeeded by Glenvil Hall
Preceded by Edith Summerskill	Minister of Social Insurance; 1951–1953	Office abolished
New office	Minister of Pensions and National Insurance; 1953–1955	Succeeded by John Boyd-Carpenter
Peerage of the United Kingdom
New creation	Viscount Ingleby; 1956–1966	Succeeded by Martin Peake
