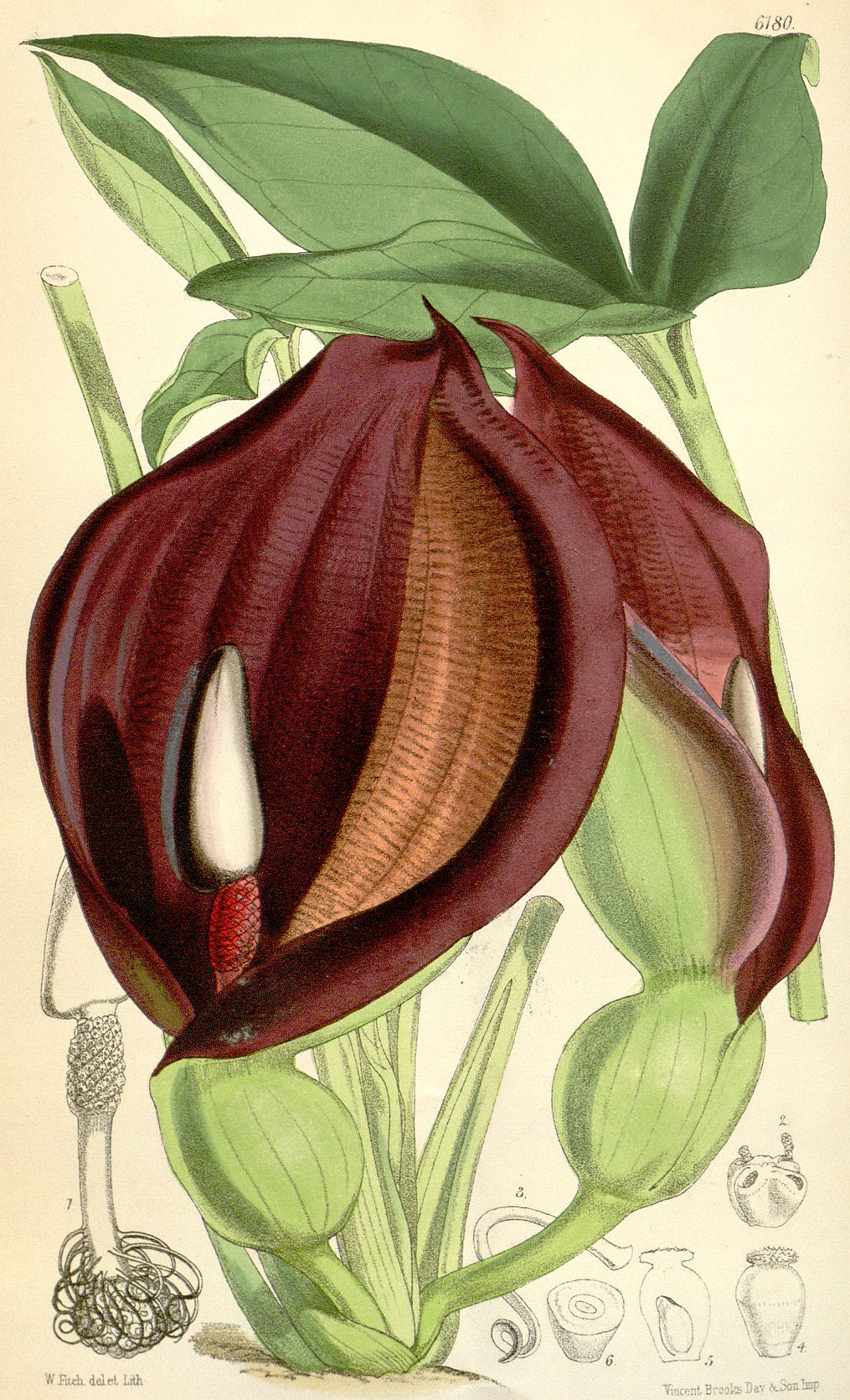
- Botanical illustration by Walter Hood Fitch

Scientific classification
- Kingdom: Plantae
- Clade: Embryophytes
- Clade: Tracheophytes
- Clade: Spermatophytes
- Clade: Angiosperms
- Clade: Monocots
- Order: Alismatales
- Family: Araceae
- Genus: Typhonium
- Species: T. brownii

Binomial name
- Typhonium brownii Schott, 1855

Synonyms
- Arum orixense R.Br.

= Typhonium brownii =

Species of flowering plant

Typhonium brownii, also known as the black arum lily, is a species of plant in the Araceae family that is endemic to Australia.

== Description ==
The species is a deciduous, geophytic, perennial herb, which resprouts annually from a rhizome up to 15 cm long and 2–3 cm in diameter. The deeply trilobed to triangular leaves are borne on stalks up to 30 cm long. The inflorescence has a foecal smell and is pollinated by dung beetles; it is enclosed in a 20 cm long spathe, greenish on the outside and deep purple on the inside. Flowering takes place in summer. The fruits are reddish and about 10 cm in diameter.

== Distribution and habitat ==
The species is known from south-eastern Queensland and New South Wales, where it grows in areas with rainforest, along the banks of creeks and in the spray zone of waterfalls.
