= Lord Edward Hay =

British soldier, commanding officer of the Grenadier Guards

- Born: 2 November 1888; East Lothian, Scotland
- Died: 18 June 1944 (aged 55); London, England
- Spouse(s): Bridget Barclay (m. 1917; died 1926) Audrey Birkin (m. 1928)
- Children: 3
- Father: William Hay
- Relatives: William Hay (brother); Edward Hay (grandson); Alistair Hay (grandson)
- Military career
- Commands: Grenadier Guards
- Wars: World War I

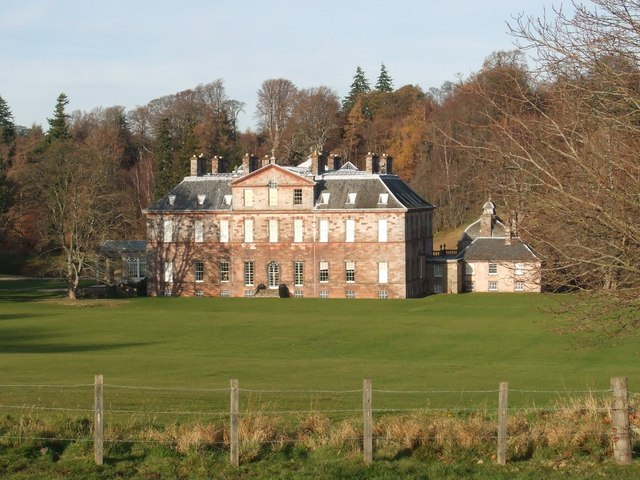
Yester House

Lord Edward Douglas John Hay DL (2 November 1888 – 18 June 1944) was a British soldier, at the time of his death commanding officer of the Grenadier Guards.

Hay saw active service in the First World War, after which he was posted on diplomatic missions. He was killed by a German V-1 flying bomb.

== Life ==
Born on 2 November 1888 in East Lothian, Scotland, Hay was the younger son of William Hay, 10th Marquess of Tweeddale, of Yester House, East Lothian, Hay was the brother and heir-presumptive of the 11th Marquess. He attended Ludgrove School.

Hay saw active service in the 1914–1918 War at Gallipoli, and in Egypt and France. He was at the Paris Peace Conference from 1919 until it concluded in 1920. After that, as a Captain in the Grenadier Guards he was Staff Captain to General Sir Edmund Ironside for Special Missions to Hungary and Romania, then from 1921 to 1923 was Military Secretary to Sir Herbert Samuel, High Commissioner for Palestine.

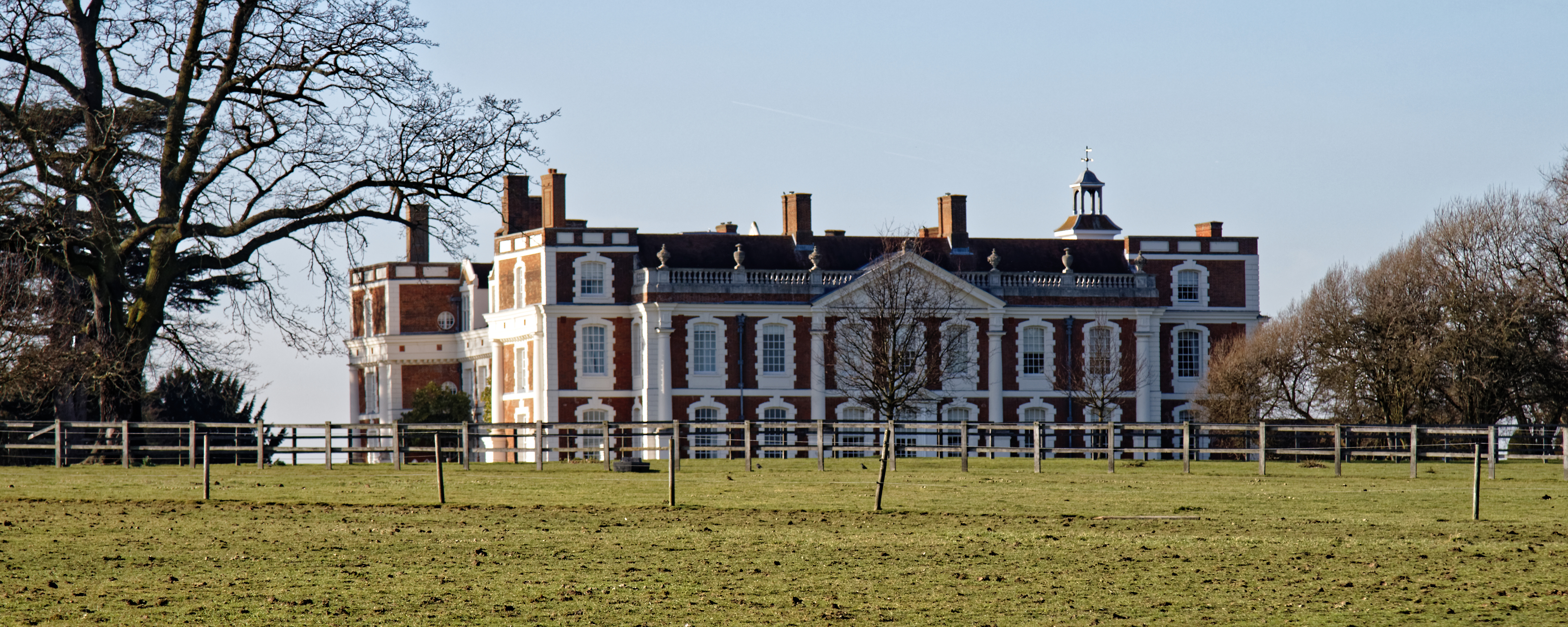
Hill Hall, Theydon Mount

Hay was also a member of Essex County Council. In 1938, he was appointed as a Deputy Lieutenant for Essex, and was then of Hill Hall, Theydon Mount.

He was promoted to Lieutenant-Colonel in the Essex Regiment and then returned to the Grenadier Guards to command his old regiment.

== Marriages and children ==
In 1917, Hay married firstly Violet Florence Catherine Barclay, known as Bridget, only daughter of Major Cameron Barclay. They had two children, Marioth Christina Hay (1918–2006) and David George Montagu Hay (1921–1979), later 12th Marquess of Tweeddale. His first wife died on 17 March 1926.

On 5 July 1928, Hay married secondly Audrey Clara Lilian Birkin, a younger daughter of Sir Thomas Latham, 1st Baronet. She was recently divorced from Sir Tim Birkin, Baronet, a racing driver, and Hay became the step-father of her two small daughters, Pamela and Sara. Together they had a daughter, Caroline Susan Elizabeth Hay (1930–2020).

== Death ==
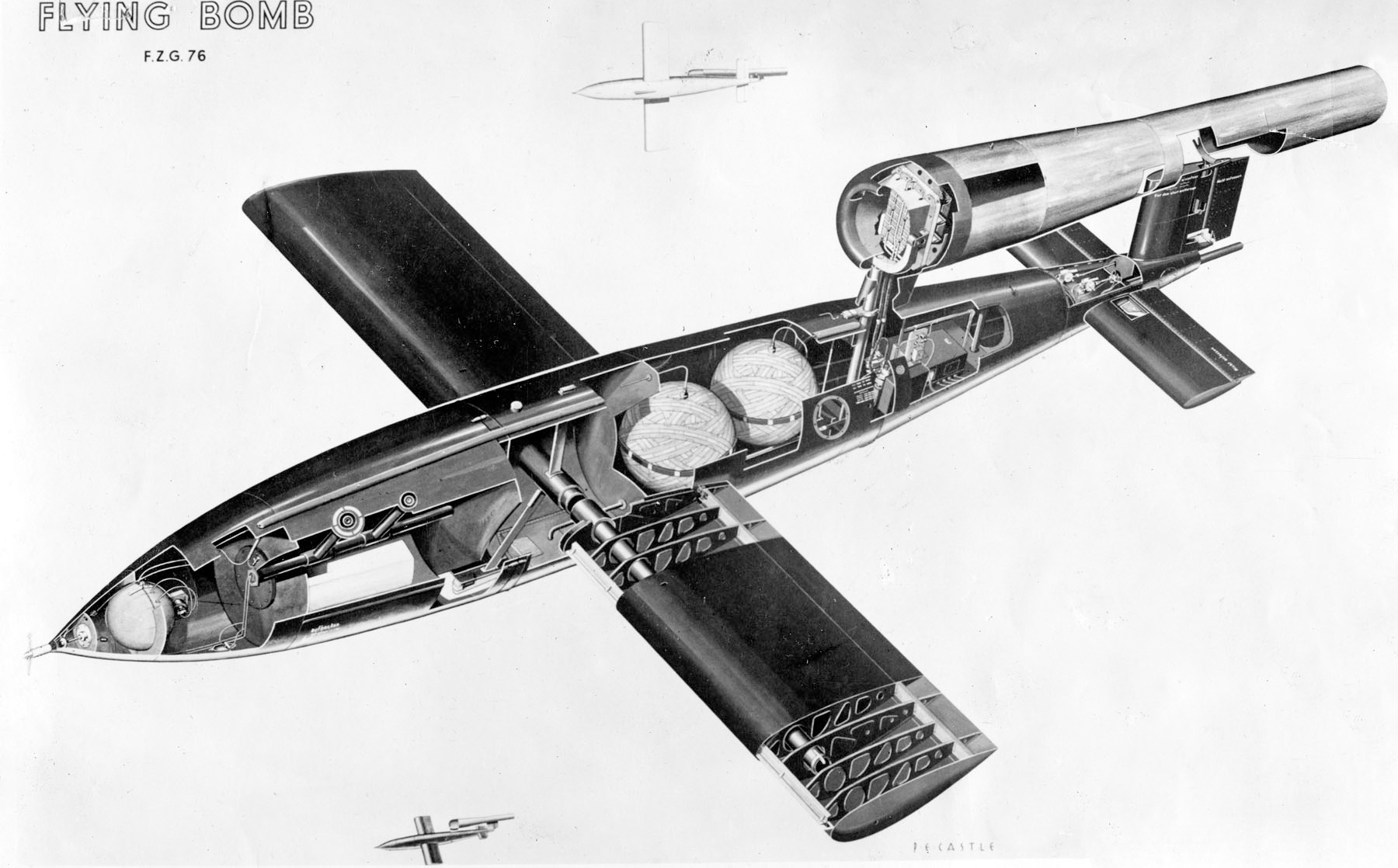
A V-1 flying bomb

On 12 June 1944, the Germans launched Operation Eisbär, a campaign of V-1 flying bomb attacks on the London area. On Sunday, 18 June, just after 11 a.m., a V-1 made a direct hit on the Guards Chapel, Wellington Barracks, during a service. This brought the chapel’s concrete roof down on top of the congregation, killing 121 people, with 141 seriously injured. The rubble within the chapel was ten feet deep in places. When the roof collapsed, Hay was just walking back to his seat, after reading a lesson, and was among those killed. He was buried in Theydon Mount, Essex.

== Later events ==
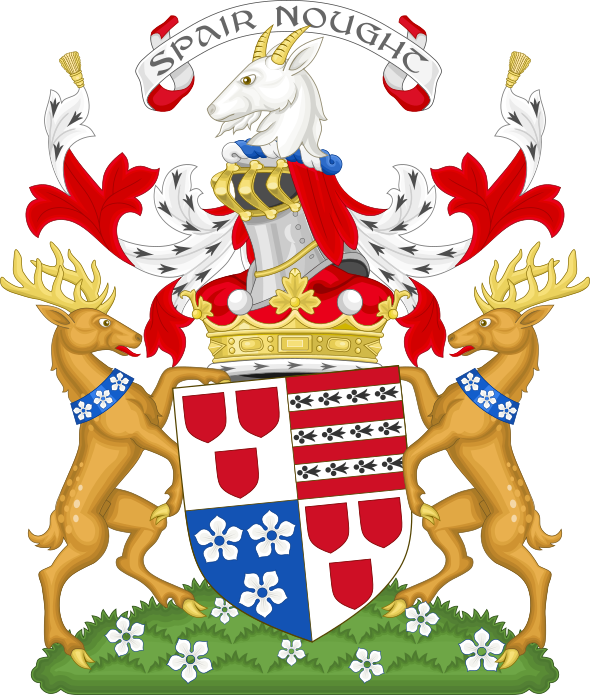
Arms of Marquess of Tweeddale.

Hay’s widow married twice more. Firstly, in 1948, Niall Greville Chaplin, younger son of Eric Chaplin, 2nd Viscount Chaplin, from whom she was divorced in 1952, and in December 1952 Major General Sir Stewart Graham Menzies, Chief of the Secret Intelligence Service.

Hay’s son, David Hay, succeeded as Marquess of Tweeddale in 1967. He married twice and had five children, the eldest of whom, born in 1947, was named Edward Douglas John Hay, after his grandfather, and became 13th Marquess.
