= Typhonium eliosurum =

Scientific classification
- Kingdom: Plantae
- Clade: Embryophytes
- Clade: Tracheophytes
- Clade: Spermatophytes
- Clade: Angiosperms
- Clade: Monocots
- Order: Alismatales
- Family: Araceae
- Genus: Typhonium
- Species: T. eliosurum

Binomial name
- Typhonium eliosurum (F.Muell. ex Benth.) O.D.Evans

Synonyms
- Typhonium brownii var. eliosurum F.Muell. ex Benth.

Species of flowering plant

Typhonium eliosurum is a species of plant in the arum family that is endemic to Australia.

== Description ==
The species is a deciduous, geophytic, perennial herb, which resprouts annually from a rhizome up to 12 cm long and 2 cm in diameter. The deeply trilobed to triangular leaves are borne on stalks up to 40 cm long. The inflorescence, which is said to smell of pig faeces, is enclosed in a 22 cm long spathe, greenish on the outside and purplish-brown on the inside. The fruits are reddish and about 10 cm in diameter. Flowering takes place from late spring to early summer.

== Distribution and habitat ==
The species is known from the Central Coast and South Coast regions of New South Wales, where it grows in damp areas near rainforest and on the banks of creeks.
