= Edward Hay, 13th Marquess of Tweeddale =

Scottish peer

The 13th Marquess of Tweeddale
- Born: 6 August 1947
- Died: 1 February 2005 (aged 57)
- Education: Trinity College, Oxford
- Relatives: Lord Alistair Hay (brother); Lord Edward Hay (grandfather); Osbert Peake, 1st Viscount Ingleby (grandfather)

Edward Douglas John Hay, 13th Marquess of Tweeddale (6 August 1947 – 1 February 2005), was a Scottish peer and member of the House of Lords.

Lord Tweeddale was the elder of twin sons of David, 12th Marquess of Tweeddale (1921–1979), and his first wife, Sonia Peake, daughter of Osbert Peake, 1st Viscount Ingleby. He was educated at Milton Abbey and Trinity College, Oxford, where he graduated BA. He became an insurance broker before succeeding his father in the marquessate and its subsidiary titles, and also as Hereditary Chamberlain of Dunfermline.

Tweeddale rarely spoke in the House of Lords, but achieved fleeting prominence during the Bosnian War debate on 28 October 1996 and in a subsequent letter to The Times on the subject.

Lord Tweeddale died unmarried on 1 February 2005, aged 57, and was succeeded by his younger twin brother Lord Charles Hay, thus becoming one of the few British peers to be succeeded by a younger twin. The next heir is their youngest brother, Lord Alistair Hay, styled Master of Tweeddale as heir presumptive.

Since none of the three brothers, the sons of the 12th Marquess's first marriage, married, the next in succession are their two half-brothers, sons of the 12th Marquess's second marriage. The two half-brothers are also twins, but the older of the two, Lord Andrew Arthur George Hay, is the only one to be married with children.

== Twin brothers succeeding as peers ==
The 13th Marquess is remembered chiefly for being one of the few British peers to be succeeded by a younger twin brother. Others include

- the third (1855–1928) and fourth Earls of Durham (1855–1929);
- the second (1855–1931) and third (1855–1935) Viscounts Knutsford.

Although the 3rd Marquess of Linlithgow and the 1st Baron Glendevon (formerly Lord John Hope) were twins, both were succeeded by their sons.

Peerage of Scotland
Preceded by David Hay	Marquess of Tweeddale; 1979–2005	Succeeded by Charles Hay
