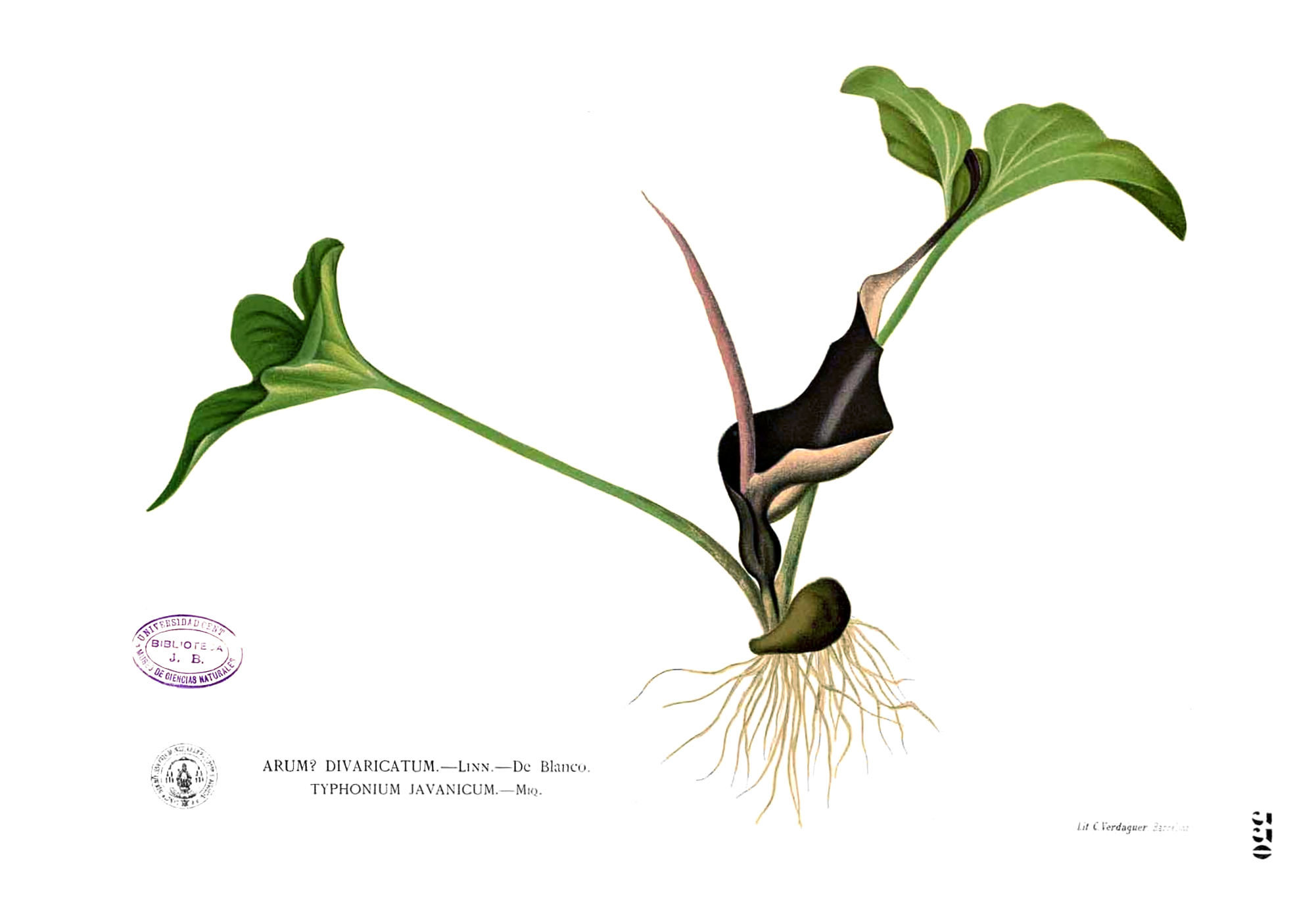
- Typhonium roxburghii

Scientific classification
- Kingdom: Plantae
- Clade: Tracheophytes
- Clade: Angiosperms
- Clade: Monocots
- Order: Alismatales
- Family: Araceae
- Subfamily: Aroideae
- Tribe: Areae
- Genus: Typhonium; Schott

Synonyms
- Desmesia Raf.; Heterostalis (Schott) Schott; Jaimenostia Guinea & Gómez Mor.; Lazarum A.Hay

= Typhonium =

Genus of flowering plants

Typhonium is a genus in the family Araceae native to eastern and southern Asia, New Guinea, and Australia. It is most often found growing in wooded areas.

Species

- Typhonium acetosella Gagnep. - Cambodia, Laos, Thailand, Vietnam
- Typhonium adnatum Hett. & Sookch. - Thailand
- Typhonium albidinervium C.Z.Tang & H.Li - Guangdong, Hainan, Laos, Thailand
- Typhonium albispathum Bogner - Thailand
- Typhonium alismifolium F.Muell. - Queensland, Northern Territory
- Typhonium angustilobum F.Muell. - Queensland, New Guinea
- Typhonium bachmaense V.D.Nguyen & Hett. - Vietnam
- Typhonium baoshanense Z.L.Dao & H.Li - Yunnan
- Typhonium blumei Nicolson & Sivad. - Japan, Taiwan, Ryukyu Islands, much of China, Bangladesh, Laos, Cambodia, Myanmar, Thailand, Vietnam; naturalized in Madagascar, Mauritius, Comoros, Borneo, Philippines, West Indies
- Typhonium bognerianum J.Murata & Sookch. - Thailand
- Typhonium brownii Schott - Queensland, New South Wales
- Typhonium bulbiferum Dalzell - southern India
- Typhonium circinnatum Hett. & J.Mood - Vietnam
- Typhonium cochleare A.Hay - Northern Territory of Australia
- Typhonium cordifolium S.Y.Hu - Thailand
- Typhonium digitatum Hett. & Sookch. - Thailand
- Typhonium echinulatum Hett. & Sookch. - Thailand
- Typhonium eliosurum (F.Muell. ex Benth.) O.D.Evans - New South Wales
- Typhonium filiforme Ridl. - Thailand, Malaysia
- Typhonium flagelliforme (G.Lodd.) Blume - Guangdong, Guangxi, Yunnan, Bangladesh, Bhutan, Cambodia, India, Indonesia, Laos, Malaysia, Myanmar, Philippines, Singapore, Sri Lanka, Thailand, New Guinea, Queensland, Northern Territory
- Typhonium fultum Ridl. - Thailand, Malaysia
- Typhonium gagnepainii J.Murata & Sookch. - Thailand, Cambodia
- Typhonium gallowayi Hett. & Sookch. - Thailand
- Typhonium glaucum Hett. & Sookch. - Thailand
- Typhonium griseum Hett. & Sookch. - Thailand
- Typhonium hayatae Sriboonma & J.Murata - Vietnam
- Typhonium huense Nguyen & Croat - Vietnam
- Typhonium hunanense H.Li & Z.Q.Liu - Hunan
- Typhonium inopinatum Prain - India, Myanmar, Thailand
- Typhonium jinpingense Z.L.Wang, H.Li & F.H.Bian - Yunnan
- Typhonium johnsonianum A.Hay & S.M.Taylor - Northern Territory of Australia
- Typhonium jonesii A.Hay - Northern Territory of Australia
- Typhonium laoticum Gagnep. - Thailand, Laos
- Typhonium liliifolium F.Muell. ex Schott - Northern Territory, Western Australia
- Typhonium lineare Hett. & V.D.Nguyen - Vietnam
- Typhonium listeri Prain - Assam, Bangladesh, Myanmar
- Typhonium medusae Hett. & Sookch. - Thailand
- Typhonium mirabile (A.Hay) A.Hay - Melville Island of Australia
- Typhonium neogracile J.Murata - Assam, Bangladesh, Myanmar
- Typhonium nudibaccatum A.Hay - Western Australia
- Typhonium orbifolium Hett. & Sookch. - Thailand
- Typhonium pedatisectum Gage - Myanmar
- Typhonium pedunculatum Hett. & Sookch. - Thailand
- Typhonium peltandroides A.Hay, M.D.Barrett & R.L.Barrett - Western Australia
- Typhonium penicillatum V.D.Nguyen & Hett. - Vietnam
- Typhonium pottingeri Prain - Myanmar
- Typhonium praecox J.Murata - Myanmar
- Typhonium praetermissum A.Hay - Northern Territory of Australia
- Typhonium pusillum Sookch., V.D.Nguyen & Hett. - Thailand
- Typhonium reflexum Hett. & Sookch. - Thailand
- Typhonium roxburghii Schott - Taiwan, Yunnan, Bonin Islands, India, Bangladesh, Sri Lanka, Andaman Islands, Thailand, Malaysia, western Indonesia, Philippines, New Guinea; naturalized in Western Australia, eastern Brazil, Tanzania
- Typhonium russell-smithii A.Hay - Northern Territory of Australia
- Typhonium sagittariifolium Gagnep. - Thailand
- Typhonium saraburiensis Sookch., Hett. & J.Murata - Thailand
- Typhonium sinhabaedyae Hett. & A.Galloway - Thailand
- Typhonium smitinandii Sookch. & J.Murata - Thailand
- Typhonium stigmatilobatum V.D.Nguyen - Vietnam
- Typhonium subglobosum Hett. & Sookch. - Thailand
- Typhonium taylorii A.Hay - Northern Territory of Australia
- Typhonium trifoliatum F.T.Wang & H.S.Lo ex H.Li, Y.Shiao & S.L.Tseng - Mongolia, Hebei, Inner Mongolia, Shaanxi, Shanxi
- Typhonium trilobatum (L.) Schott - southern China, Indian Subcontinent, Indochina; naturalized in Windward Islands, Ivory Coast, Borneo, Philippines
- Typhonium tubispathum Hett. & A.Galloway - Thailand
- Typhonium varians Hett. & Sookch. - Thailand
- Typhonium vermiforme V.D.Nguyen & Croat - Vietnam
- Typhonium violifolium Gagnep . - Myanmar, Thailand
- Typhonium watanabei J.Murata, Sookch. & Hett. - Thailand
- Typhonium weipanum A.Hay - Queensland
- Typhonium wilbertii A.Hay - Queensland
