= Viscount Ingleby =

Title in the Peerage of the United Kingdom

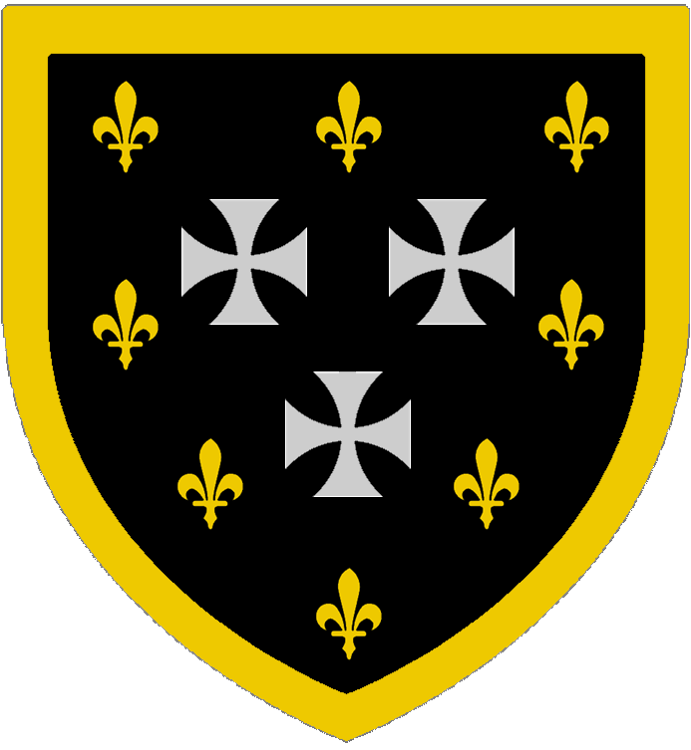
Sable three Crosses patée Argent within an Orle of eight Fleur-de-lys and a Bordure Or

Viscount Ingleby, of Snilesworth in the North Riding of the County of York, was a title in the Peerage of the United Kingdom. It was created on 17 January 1956 for the Conservative politician and former Minister of Pensions and National Insurance, Osbert Peake. He was succeeded by his only son, the second Viscount. The title became extinct on his death in 2008.

The family seat was Snilesworth Lodge, near Osmotherley, North Yorkshire.

== Viscounts Ingleby (1956) ==
- Osbert Peake, 1st Viscount Ingleby (1897–1966)
- Martin Raymond Peake, 2nd Viscount Ingleby (1926–2008)
  - Hon. Richard Martin Herbert Peake (1953–1975)
