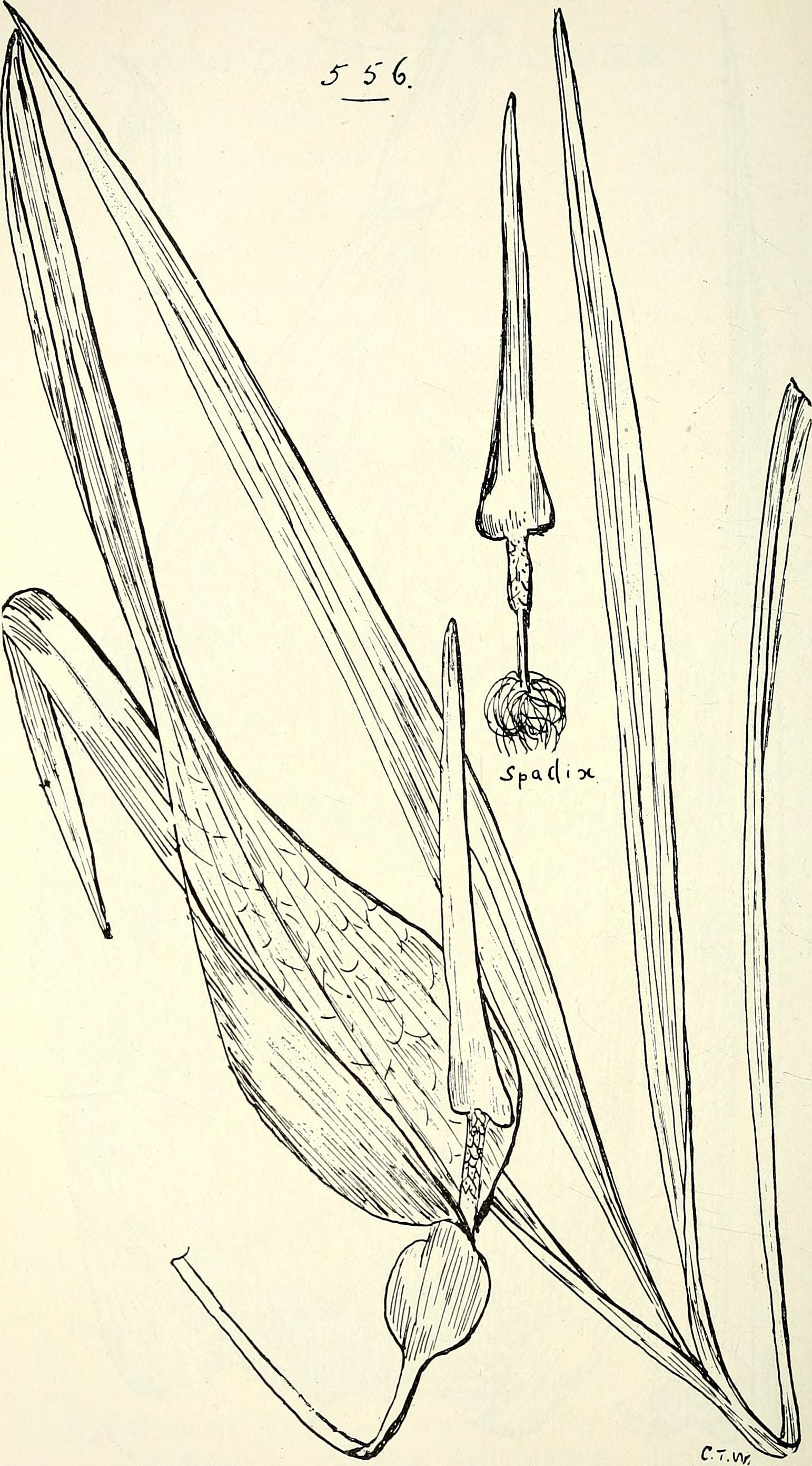
- Botanical illustration

Scientific classification
- Kingdom: Plantae
- Clade: Embryophytes
- Clade: Tracheophytes
- Clade: Spermatophytes
- Clade: Angiosperms
- Clade: Monocots
- Order: Alismatales
- Family: Araceae
- Genus: Typhonium
- Species: T. angustilobum

Binomial name
- Typhonium angustilobum F.Muell., 1876

= Typhonium angustilobum =

Species of flowering plant

Typhonium angustilobum is a species of plant in the Araceae family that is native to Australia and New Guinea.

== Description ==
The species is a deciduous geophytic, perennial herb, which resprouts annually from a corm 4–10 cm in diameter. The narrowly trilobate leaves are borne on stalks up to 35 cm long. The flower is enclosed in a 22 cm long spathe, greenish on the outside, brownish-purple on the inside.

== Distribution and habitat ==
The species is known from northern Queensland as well as the Western Province of Papua New Guinea, where it grows in open woodland.
