= Typhonium alismifolium =

Scientific classification
- Kingdom: Plantae
- Clade: Embryophytes
- Clade: Tracheophytes
- Clade: Spermatophytes
- Clade: Angiosperms
- Clade: Monocots
- Order: Alismatales
- Family: Araceae
- Genus: Typhonium
- Species: T. alismifolium

Binomial name
- Typhonium alismifolium F.Muell., 1873

Species of flowering plant

Typhonium alismifolium is a species of plant in the Araceae family that is endemic to Australia.

== Description ==
The species is a deciduous, geophytic, perennial herb which resprouts annually from a corm about 5 cm in diameter. The oval to trilobed leaves are borne on 10–70 cm long stalks. The flower is enclosed in a 25 cm long spathe, green on the outside, deep brownish-purple on the inside.

== Distribution and habitat ==
The species is known from the Northern Territory and northeastern Queensland, where it grows in dry rainforest and deciduous vine forest.
