= Typhonium jinpingense =

Scientific classification
- Kingdom: Plantae
- Clade: Tracheophytes
- Clade: Angiosperms
- Clade: Monocots
- Order: Alismatales
- Family: Araceae
- Genus: Typhonium
- Species: T. jinpingense

Binomial name
- Typhonium jinpingense Z.T. Wang, H. Li & F.H. Bian

Species of flowering plant

Typhonium jinpingense, common name "artist's aroid," is a plant species native to Jingping County, Yunnan Province, China. It grows in wet fields and on stream banks at elevations of 1,000–1,600 metres (3,300–5,200 ft).

Typhonium jinpingense is a deciduous perennial herb with a tuberous rhizome. It produces one to three leaves, each heart-shaped to arrowhead-shaped, up to 10 centimetres (3.9 in) long. Spathe is egg-shaped, green below, dark purple above, about 13 centimetres (5.1 in) long. Spadix is greenish to yellows, about 14 centimetres (5.5 in) long, with a purple tip. Chromosome number: 2n=10.
