= Martin Peake, 2nd Viscount Ingleby =

British peer and businessman

Martin Raymond Peake, 2nd Viscount Ingleby (31 May 1926 – 14 October 2008) was a British hereditary peer and businessman.

== Early life and education ==
Ingleby was the only son of Osbert Peake, created Viscount Ingleby in 1956, and his wife Lady Joan Capell, daughter of George Capell, 7th Earl of Essex.

He was educated at Eton and Trinity College, Oxford. Prior to his disability he was a lieutenant in the Coldstream Guards from 1945 to 1947. He was rendered a paraplegic early in life due to polio.

In 1955, he was called to the bar at the Inner Temple. He succeeded to the viscountcy upon his father's death in 1966 and became a member of the House of Lords until the enactment of the House of Lords Act 1999.

== Later life ==
A director of the Hargreaves Group from 1960 to 1980, Ingleby was also interested in forestry and conservation. He was a member of the planning committee for the North York Moors National Park, and was responsible for the planting of a row of lime trees at the entrance to the park, which he intended as a thanksgiving for God's deliverance of Britain during the two World Wars. He also served on the North Yorkshire County Council during the 1960s.

Ingleby and Baroness Masham, who also used a wheelchair, took a prominent part in the House of Lords in the debate on the Disabled Persons Act 1970.

== Marriage and children ==
Ingleby married Gladys Susan Landale (died 1996) in 1952, with whom he had five children:

- Hon Richard Martin Herbert Peake (7 August 1953 - 19 July 1975)
- Hon Fiona Catherine Peake (born 24 January 1955) married Gavin Tobias Alexander Winterbottom Horton in 1977
- Hon Sarah Rachel Peake (born 27 November 1958) married James Felton Hervey-Bathurst in 1982
- Hon Henrietta Cecilia Imogen Peake (born 23 October 1961) married James J. P. McNeile in 1990
- Hon Katharine Susan Emma Peake (born 23 December 1963) married James Freeman in 1996.

In 1975, Ingleby suffered a personal tragedy when his only son, Richard, fell from Beachy Head and was killed. The coroner's inquest recorded an open verdict.

After the death of his first wife in 1996, Ingleby married Dobrila Radovic in 2003. They had no children.

== Death ==
Lord Ingleby died in 2008 at the age of 82. As his only son predeceased him, and as there were no other surviving male line heirs of the 1st Viscount, the viscountcy became extinct on his death.

== Arms ==
Coat of arms of Martin Peake, 2nd Viscount Ingleby
Coronet Coronet of a viscount Crest A Heart Gules between two Wings displayed Erminois Escutcheon Sable three Crosses patée Argent within an Orle of eight Fleur-de-lys and a Bordure Or Supporters On either side a Blackfaced Swaledale Ram proper holding in the mouth a Rose Argent barbed seeded slipped and leaved also proper Motto Quae Supra Quaerenda (What is on high is worth seeking)

Peerage of the United Kingdom
Preceded by Osbert Peake	Viscount Ingleby; 1966–2008	Extinct
