= Snilesworth =

Civil parish in North Yorkshire, England

Snilesworth Snilesby
- Former parish
- Road across Snilesworth Moor
- Interactive map of Snilesworth
- Coordinates: 54.3604°N 1.2041°W
- Country: England
- County: North Yorkshire

Area
  - Total: 2,029 ha (5,010 acres)
- Elevation: 334 m (1,096 ft)

Population (1971)
  - Total: 42
- Time zone: UTC00:00

Snilesworth (sometimes recorded as Snilesby) is a former civil parish near Hawnby and Helmsley in North Yorkshire, England. The area is first recorded in 1150 and lends its name to the nearby moorland surrounding it to the north. The area is now part of the Civil Parish of Hawnby, but its population was listed separately until 1974, when it was merged into Hawnby. The area is 8 miles (13 km) north-west of Helmsley, and 11 miles (18 km) north-east of Thirsk. The River Rye rises on Snilesworth Moor, and picks up many tributaries in the area.

== History ==
The area is located around the upland road that runs between Osmotherley and Hawnby, with much of the area being moorland, ravines and waterfalls, with the River Rye rising on Snilesworth Moor. In 1828, Snilesworth was described as a hamlet in the townships of Arden and Bilsdale West Side. The name is first recorded c. 1150-1170 as Snigleswath meaning Snigel's ford; Wath is a common suffix in North Yorkshire for a crossing place on a river or stream. The only farm known to have been in existence in 1150 was Wether House in Bilsdale West Side, which is recorded as Widheris in a grant from Stephen de Meynell to Rievaulx Abbey. Whilst no official records document the area pre-1150, Cowley theorises that after the Harrying of the North, for which Helmsley and Hawnby did suffer, anyone looking north from Hawnby would see only moorland and woodland, so they would not think to venture further. This also occurred at Reeth in Swaledale, where some Norse settlements did exist, but were not recorded in the Domesday Book.

In the period between 1150 and 1170, Hugh Malebise granted the area of Snilesworth to the monks at Byland Abbey; this stated "Snigelswath with land, wood and pasture to the north and west of Blawathgill as far as the territory of Hawnby stretches towards Cleveland." This means that the exact boundaries of Snilesworth were undefined apart from Blawathgill (now known as Blow Gill). Similarly, the streams and the River Rye formed the old boundaries between Snilesworth, Arden and Daletown. The Dissolution documents for Byland Abbey detail 14 farms in the "Grange of Snyleswath" which had been in the possession of the abbey. After the Dissolution, the large estate passed through several families and lords (including Sir William Pickering), but was in the possession of the Manners family from 1600 until 1913, when Major G. H. Peake bought the estate, and the neighbouring Whorlton Moor (to the north). At the point of sale, the estate was listed as having 17 farms and Snilesworth Lodge.

In the early 1870s, the parish was described as covering 2,029 hectares (5,015 acres) and having a population of 100 living in 22 houses. Snilesworth is 8 miles (13 km) north-west of Helmsley, and 11 miles (18 km) north-east of Thirsk. The road across the moor runs from Osmotherley in the west, to Hawnby in the south-east, a route which John Wesley crossed in 1757, and he declared it to be "...one of the pleasantest parts of England..." Bill Cowley's history of the area states that the combined areas of Snilesworth, Arden, Ladhill Gill and Bilsdale West Side, cover over 5,700 hectares (14,000 acres) between them, with about 75% of that being heather moorland.

Historically, the township was in the wapentake of Birdforth, with its parish boundary with Hawnby being separated by Blow Gill (an affluent of the River Rye), and its boundary with Cleveland being near to Prod Howe (SE527983). It was separated out into its own civil parish in 1866, however, in 1974, when the old North Riding was moved into North Yorkshire, the township of Snilesworth became part of a larger parish of Hawnby being moved from the parish of Arden and Bilsdale West Side.

In 1842, a seam of coal was discovered in the area which was described as being superior in quality to other seams found in the locality; however, as the area was remote from good transportation routes, the coal was only of use to those who lived in the locality. Snilesworth Moor also has beds of ironstone beneath it, most notably the Dogger Seam and the Ellerbeck Beds. Iron was worked for the monks at Rievaulx, and in the 19th and early 20th-centuries, at least one farmer fashioned his own ploughs form locally sourced iron, though the farmer later acquired better quality iron from Middlesbrough.

Snilesworth Moor reaches a height of 334 metres (1,096 ft), and has several cairns upon it; Iron Howe is described as having "hundreds" of them. It was not realised how extensive the cairn group was until a moor fire at Snilesworth in 1959. Snilesworth Lodge (at SE510955) is the manor house/country seat of the parish, latterly occupied by the Ingleby's. The lodge is not a listed building, but several small buildings in the former parish are listed, and are now under the parish of Hawnby. Snilesworth Lodge is now part of the Farndale Estate, and can be rented out.

=== Population ===
Population of Snilesworth (or Snilesby township) 1831–1971
Year	1831	1841	1851	1861	1871	1881	1891	1901	1911	1921	1931	1951	1961	1971
Population	116	116	124	100	90	104	88	84	63	59	54	57	53	42

== Notable people ==
- Iris Dawnay (née Peake), born in London, but raised partly at her family's estate at Snilesworth Lodge
