= Alistair Hay =

Australian botanist

- Born: 1955 (age 70–71)
- Occupation: Botanist
- Relatives: Edward Hay, 13th Marquess of Tweeddale (brother); Lord Edward Hay (grandfather); Osbert Peake, 1st Viscount Ingleby (grandfather)

Alistair James Montagu Hay (born 1955) is an Australian botanist. He is a former director of the Royal Botanic Garden, Sydney. He is the heir presumptive to his older brother Charles, 14th Marquess of Tweeddale (born 1947). Although entitled to the courtesy style of "Lord" as the younger son of a marquess, he does not use the style.

The standard author abbreviation A.Hay is used to indicate this person as the author when citing a botanical name.
