= Mammary Lane =

- Genre: Talk, comedy
- Running time: 5–6 hours (approx.)
- Country of origin: United States
- Home station: Howard 100
- Starring: Howard Stern; Robin Quivers; Fred Norris; Artie Lange; Gary Dell'Abate
- Created by: "The Tapes Team"
- Original release: April 4, 2007 – February 19, 2009
- No. of episodes: 11
- Opening theme: "Mammary Lane" by Grover
- Ending theme: "Tortured Man" by Howard Stern and The Dust Brothers

Mammary Lane was a listener request show featuring clips of The Howard Stern Show. The show aired on Howard 100 and Howard 101 on SIRIUS XM Radio, during certain weeks when the Stern Show was on vacation. The hosts of the show rotated, including Richard Christy, Sal "The Stockbroker" Governale, Jason Kaplan, Will Murray, Gary Dell'Abate, and Jon Hein. The show was a production of "The Tapes Team" at SIRIUS, along with Master Tape Theatre, Stern Spotlight, The History of Howard Stern and Road Trip. Past Mammary Lane episodes aired on Howard 101.

== Episodes ==
=== Episode 1: April 4, 2007 ===
- Stuttering John's Stock Trading Prank On Gary
- Jackie Craps In The Stanley Cup
- January 12, 2004: Triumph The Insult Comic Dog Roasts Howard On His Birthday
- "Butt Cheek Fever" Bit
- April Fool's Prank On Gary
- November 19, 1999: Wack Pack Politically Incorrect with Bill Maher
- December 5, 1997: Howard Interviews Donny Osmond
- The Gary Puppet Gets Stolen
- July 26, 1990: Gary Says "Baba Booey" For The First Time
- August 18, 2004: KC Wins And Loses $330,000 On Gambling Web Site

=== Episode 2: April 5, 2007 ===
Hosted by Richard Christy.

- Howard And Gary's Sega Channel Incident
- My Dead Lady Play
- May 15, 1996: Scott The Engineer Attacked By Kids
- January 17, 2002: Wrestler Booker T Visits
- Stuttering John Scams Steve Grillo
- Philly Zookeeper Funeral Song Parody Winners
- Fred's Name Change
- March 17, 2000: Hank The Dwarf And Beetlejuice Visit

=== Episode 3: November 19, 2007 ===
Hosted by Jon Hein and Gary Dell'Abate.

- German Broadcasters Visit
- March 16, 2000: Kotex The Angry Jamaican Woman Calls
- January 12, 1995: Jan Michael Vincent Interview
- March 7, 2001: Gilbert Gottfried Segment
- August 15, 1995: Monkey Programs K-Rock
- January 5, 2005: Gary's Battleship Sleepover
- May 9, 1997: Stuttering John Visits Boston University
- Tiny Tim Interview From 1988
- March 31, 2003: Lenny Kravitz Interview

=== Episode 4: February 18, 2008 ===
Hosted by Jon Hein and Gary Dell'Abate.

- June 27, 2001: Password Game With Beetlejuice
- May 17, 1999: KC's Dick In A Box Story
- June 12, 2001: Gene Simmons And Craig Gass As Gene Simmons
- July 24, 1995: Howard Talks About F'ing The Skull Of Sally Jesse Raphael
- November 9, 1993: Corbin Bernsen Interview
- June 15, 2004: Artie As A Pig On Coke Story
- May 6, 1993: Brian May Interview
- May 10, 2002: Jason Biggs Interview
- August 20, 1996: Lars Ulrich Interview
- March 8, 1995: Howard Flips Out On Dallas Station General Manager
- January 23, 1990: Ted The Janitor As Mayor Barry
- February 22, 1999: Black Jeopardy

=== Episode 5: February 19, 2008 ===
- January 9, 1987: Big Penis Contest
- September 23, 1998: Goo Goo Dolls Gay Wednesday
- February 8, 1995: Seth The Urine Drinker
- October 12, 2004: Comedian Mitch Hedberg Visits
- February 21, 1989: Brian Wilson Interview
- December 7, 1987: Howard Calls Japan On Pearl Harbor Day
- February 6, 1991: Baseball Player Steve Sax Interview
- February 12, 1992: Mark Harris Interview
- February 2, 1998: Sal The Stockbroker Strikes Again

=== Episode 6: April 16, 2008 ===
Hosted by Jon Hein and Gary Dell'Abate.

- March 13, 2001: Hypnotist Paul McKenna Hypnotizes Fred
- May 15, 1996: Howard's Prank Call
- October 28, 1994: Scott Baio Interview
- February 3, 2005: Anson Williams Interview
- February 2, 1995: Corbin Bernsen Interview
- June 26, 1996: Fake Kelly Le Brock
- December 8, 1994: Carly Simon Interview
- November 19, 2001: Johnny Rebel Interview
- March 23, 2001: Judy Garland Tapes
- September 22, 1997: Steven Tyler And Joe Perry Interview

=== Episode 7: April 17, 2008 ===
Hosted by Jon Hein and Gary Dell'Abate.

- March 19, 1997: The Rap Summit
- August 17, 1995: Howard Makes Robin The Boss Of Gary And Scott
- September 28, 1995: Kenneth Keith Kallenbach And Girlfriend Visit
- September 23, 1991: David Cassidy Interview
- February 4, 2002: UFO Guy Interview
- August 9, 2001: Darrell Hammond Interview
- 1988, 1989, June 4, 2003: A Few Guess Who's The Jew Segments
- May 26, 1993: Howard Punishes His Audience
- November 16, 2005: Rush Limbaugh Discussion
- Bob And Ray Compilation from 1991

=== Episode 8: February 16, 2009 ===
For the week February 16–19, 2009 a "Mammary Lane Marathon" was played and was hosted by Jon Hein and Gary Dell'Abate.

- June 8, 2000: Enrique Iglesias sings live in the studio
- July 30, 1993: Gilbert Gottfried sits in during Robin's news
- February 8, 1991: Stuttering John
- October 16, 2002: Yucko the Clown "calls in from Maryland" during sniper shootings with a target on him
- September 30, 1999: Roseanne visits and Tom Arnold calls in
- January 28, 1993: Bobby Vinton sings the national anthem
- July 31, 2001: Snoop Dogg and Tha Eastsidaz visit
- March 22, 2001: King of All Blacks guesses garbage
- January 14, 2003: Martin Lawrence visits
- June 2, 1987: Gary's breath judged by a workman
- August 7, 1998: Robin's family in the studio

=== Episode 9: February 17, 2009 ===
For the week February 16–19, 2009 a "Mammary Lane Marathon" was played and was hosted by Jon Hein and Gary Dell'Abate.

- February 10, 1995: Ralph loses bet and dresses in drag
- July 30, 1997: Crazy Alice's first call to the show
- October 22, 1997: Gilbert Gottfried at Amy Heckerling's House
- October 10, 2000: A man who taxidermied his daughter visits
- March 8, 2000: Pig Olympics
- August 4, 2000: Beetlejuice running for Senator
- February 13, 2002: Raymond Norman's tape on Oprah Winfrey
- October 8, 2004: Howard hates Ronnie the Limo Driver's new limousine
- August 19, 1998: Wesley Snipes visits
- November 16, 2004: Robin's news segment about a man lighting himself on fire
- June 23, 1999: Freaky Feud with Penthouse Pets and Wack Pack members
- May 18, 2001: “Kataleen” Turner and Artie

=== Episode 10: February 18, 2009 ===
For the week February 16–19, 2009 a "Mammary Lane Marathon" was played and was hosted by Jon Hein and Gary Dell'Abate.

- September 30, 1992: Richard Simmons visits
- January 20, 2005: Woman who slept with her stepson calls in
- January 23, 2002: Artie's Mike Tyson impersonation
- April 4, 2005: Pat O'Brien and Pope discussions
- April 4, 1996: Gilbert Gottfried calls in as "Rabbi Gottfried"
- May 5, 1997: Mia Farrow visits
- March 15, 1996: John F. Kennedy Jr. visits
- August 15, 2002: Boxer Laila Ali calls in
- September 11, 2000: Song parody contest
- September 14, 2000: Song parody contest winners announced

=== Episode 11: February 19, 2009 ===
For the week February 16–19, 2009 a "Mammary Lane Marathon" was played and was hosted by Jon Hein and Gary Dell'Abate.

- January 27, 1998: Robert Duvall visits
- April 14, 2000: The Gossip Game with guest Flavor Flav
- May 7, 1996: Ozzy Osbourne calls in and goofs on Stuttering John
- April 14, 2000: Matthew McConaughey visits
- May 4, 2004: Goofing on Heather Wilson
- June 26, 1992: Billy West doing his Ross Perot impersonation
- November 28, 2001: Penthouse Pet Megan Mason spins The Wheel of Sex
- January 25, 2002: Yaqi the Tickler visits
- April 22, 2002: Woman visits to help Robin speak to her horses
- September 12, 2005: Fred the Elephant Boy soils himself
