= Stern Spotlight =

- Genre: Comedy, Talk
- Running time: 6-12 hours
- Country of origin: United States
- Home station: Howard 100
- Starring: Howard Stern; Robin Quivers; Fred Norris
- Created by: Howard 100 Tapes Department
- Original release: 2007 – 2008
- Opening theme: "You're a Shooting Star"
- Ending theme: "Tortured Man" by Howard Stern and The Dust Brothers
- Website: http://sirius.com/Howard100

Stern Spotlight was a "best of" compilation of The Howard Stern Show. Each episode showcased a specific cast member past or present of the Stern Show. The specials aired during select weeks when The Howard Stern Show was on vacation during its timeslot. The show was a production of "The Tapes Team" at SIRIUS, along with Master Tape Theatre, Mammary Lane, and The History of Howard Stern.

== Episodes ==
1. Billy West, part 1 (February 19, 2007)
2. Billy West, part 2 (February 20, 2007)
3. Jackie Martling, part 1 (May 29, 2007)
4. Jackie Martling, part 2 (May 30, 2007)
5. Stuttering John, part 1 (April 14, 2008)
6. Stuttering John, part 2 (April 15, 2008)

== See also ==
- Mammary Lane
- The History of Howard Stern
- Master Tape Theatre
