= Master Tape Theatre =

- Genre: Comedy, Talk
- Running time: 4 hours
- Country of origin: United States
- Home station: Howard 101
- Starring: Howard Stern; Robin Quivers; Fred Norris
- Created by: Howard 100 Tapes Department
- Original release: 2006 – 2015
- Ending theme: "Tortured Man" by Howard Stern and The Dust Brothers
- Website: http://sirius.com/Howard101

Master Tape Theatre was a radio show that broadcast uncensored versions of The Howard Stern Show on Howard 101 on Sundays at 3:00pm (Eastern Time) on Howard 101. Each episode was presented as a moment in "Howard history" and was presented by the fictional British character, Sir Hardin Thicke, voiced by voice-over actor Mike Pollock.

The show was a production of "The Tapes Team" at SIRIUS, along with Stern Spotlight, Mammary Lane and The History of Howard Stern.

== See also ==
- Mammary Lane
- Stern Spotlight
- The History of Howard Stern
