= List of The Howard Stern Show staff =

This is a list of staff members and contributors to The Howard Stern Show.

== Current staff ==
These staffers currently work for and appear on the show on a regular, if not hourly basis.

=== In-studio ===
These people currently sit in the studio throughout the entire broadcast or have an exclusively in-studio role with the show when present.

==== Howard Stern ====
Howard Stern is the host of the show, which essentially is a discussion of topics that include world affairs, celebrity gossip, self-deprecation, sexual relationships, bodily functions, conflicts among his staff, his own personal family matters, and the antics of the show's Wack Pack. Self-proclaimed "King of All Media".

==== Robin Quivers ====
Robin Ophelia Quivers is a native of Baltimore, Maryland, and first met Stern after being assigned as his newscaster at WWDC in March 1981. She has been his co-host and news anchor ever since. She is a former nurse and Captain in the United States Air Force. Quivers briefly left the show towards the end of her time at WWDC. In 1982, Stern signed a contract to work at WNBC, and Quivers did not realize WNBC initially refused to hire her. Quivers returned to the show at WNBC a month after Stern began, having convinced WNBC management to hire Robin after all.

Stern once said that Quivers is the only person on the show that he allowed to talk freely during the broadcast, although comedian Artie Lange was allowed this privilege as well during his years on the show.

==== Fred Norris ====
Of the show's staff, Stern met Norris first, in 1979, when the two worked as disc jockeys at WCCC in Hartford, Connecticut. Norris worked the overnight shift, after which Stern hosted the morning show. Although Stern left shortly afterwards, Norris stayed at WCCC until joining Stern and Quivers at Washington, D.C.'s WWDC in 1981. The "Earth Dog Fred" nickname originated in Washington, as Norris replaced an engineer nicknamed "Earth Dog Brent."

Norris' current role on the show is to provide sound effects, organize and direct commercials and live reads, and perform writing duties. Norris also provides impersonations of show regulars, celebrities and others.

=== Outside the studio ===
These are the behind-the-scenes personnel, although, in the Stern world, many of these staff members appear on air.

==== Steve Brandano ====
Brandano, previously known as "Steve The Intern," answers Stern's phones, is a contributor on The Wrap-Up Show, and was formerly the host of the Thursday night intern show.

==== Richard Christy ====
While working as an electrician in Florida and playing as a drummer in a number of heavy metal bands including Iced Earth and Death, Christy began calling into the show from October 1999, initially sending voice mails to the show's assistant producer K. C. Armstrong, which were played on-air. From 2001 to 2003, Christy sent song parodies and bits about Armstrong and show co-host Robin Quivers including some like "It's K.C.'s Sausage Party" (a parody of "It's My Party") and "Gay Photograph" (a parody of the Def Leppard song "Photograph") that continue to be played on the show to this day. Christy made his first visit to the show on April 24, 2003, where he played a round of blackjack to win a date with a porn star.

In July 2004, when the show was holding a "Win John's Job" contest following the departure of Stuttering John from the show, Christy won the position as voted by fans. Since joining the show, Christy has become known for his prank calls, song parodies, unique personality, and "show stunts" he's performed with his writing partner Sal the Stockbroker.

Christy is currently the drummer in the heavy-metal band Charred Walls of the Damned.

==== Gary Dell'Abate ====
Gary Dell'Abate, aka Baba Booey, serves as the show's executive producer. He was hired right after graduating from Adelphi University in 1984. Howard would call him Boy Gary and Dell'Abate briefly anglicized his name to Gary Dell. He is mocked on the Stern Show for his appearance, gullibility (he once booked a mentally challenged woman who claimed to be Madonna's sister), and frequent mispronunciations (for example, insisting that actor Nick Nolte's last name was pronounced "Nolt"). He earned the nickname "Baba Booey" after insisting it to be the correct name of the cartoon character Baba Looey.

==== Sal Governale ====
Salvatore "Sal" Governale, originally referred to as Sal the Stockbroker, began his involvement with the show in 1996 as a frequent caller. After graduating from Suffolk County Community College, Sal solicited donations for a boiler room operation in the 1990s that was later raided by federal agents. He then worked for two investment firms who were investigated and fined for questionable business practices, followed by selling illegal bootleg video of rock concerts on eBay. Stern took notice of Sal when he began making numerous calls mocking Gary Dell'Abate as a "horse-tooth jackass".

Despite coming in second place in the 2004 "Win John's Job" contest to future writing partner Richard Christy, and losing a stand-up comedy competition to wack packer Vin The Retard in 2005, Sal was eventually hired as a prank caller and writer for the show and is currently credited as a producer.

Governale appeared in the 2014 comedy horror film Jersey Shore Massacre with fellow Howard Stern alumni Richard Christy.

In 2020, when Korean music group BTS was visiting the Sirius offices, remarks made by Governale linking the band to Coronavirus resulted in listener backlash with Stern stating the Governale "came off as racist".

==== J. D. Harmeyer ====
Born in December 1979 in Fairborn, Ohio, Jamie Daniel "J. D." Harmeyer is Stern's head media producer. He records television shows, pulls clips from the internet, and edits together highlights from recent movies and TV. He attended Full Sail University in Winter Park, Florida.

==== Jon Hein ====
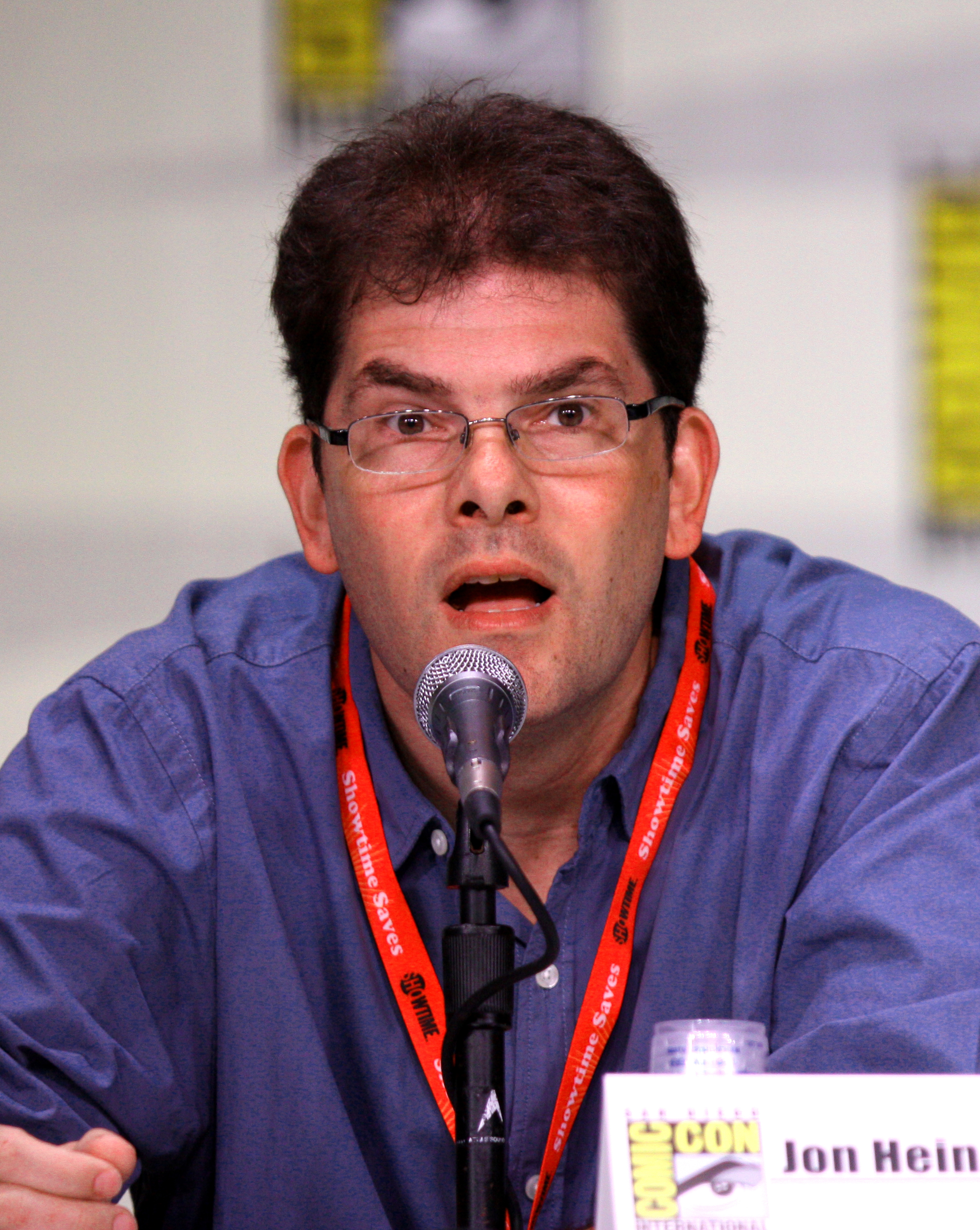
Jon Hein

Jon Hein made his first guest appearances on the show on May 3, 2001, discussing television shows that have "jumped the shark", a term he uses to describe when a show has passed its prime (based on an episode of the show, Happy Days, where a previously popular and well-done show clearly and memorably began to go downhill). In late 2005, while experimental programming was broadcast on Howard 100 and Howard 101, Hein presented the first edition of Superfan Roundtable. His success in on-air hosting led him to become the co-host of The Wrap-Up Show when the show moved to SiriusXM in January 2006.

Hein was a co-host on the weekly Thursday show, "Jon Hein's TV Show" with J. D. Harmeyer, Steve Brandano and Jenny Hutt. He also co-hosted the weekly Friday show "Geek Time" with Jason Kaplan and Ralph Cirella. Both shows have since been canceled.

==== Jason Kaplan ====
Jason Kaplan is an executive producer for the show. His duties include writing the daily show rundown that appears on the show's website and taking photos that appear alongside the daily rundown. In September 2007, Jason and HowardTV director Scott DePace engaged in an intense feud stemming from their political differences.

Jason was married to his girlfriend, Janis, on November 8, 2008. Notable guests at the ceremony included Howard Stern, Robin Quivers, Gary Dell'Abate, and most of Stern's staff. The reception featured speeches from fellow staff members, Ronnie Mund and J. D. Harmeyer. Kaplan hosted "Page 69" along with Will Murray. On the wrap-up show on August 19, Kaplan stated that he grew up in Stanhope, New Jersey, and attended Rutgers University.

Kaplan hosted monthly episodes of The Fat Guy Show. Kaplan was a producer of the monthly show Geek Time that aired Fridays, with Jon Hein and Ralph Cirella.

On December 8, 2020, Kaplan stated he was an executive producer during the show's broadcast, serving alongside longtime executive producer Gary Dell'Abate.

==== Ronnie Mund ====
Ronald Mund, commonly referred to as Ronnie the Limo Driver, born October 28, 1949, was Stern's limousine driver and later his bodyguard. Ronald is 5 foot, 2 inches tall and was frequently mocked for not being able to see over the steering wheel of his limo without sitting on a stack of textbooks by Howard on air. He later became the head of security for the Stern show studios and offices at Sirius Radio. After serving in the Air Force, Mund started a limo business. He began driving for Stern in 1986, and quickly became a character on the radio show. In 2011, Ronnie began touring night clubs around the U.S. with other talent from The Howard Stern Show on the "Ronnie Mund Block Party." In March 2013, Ronnie hosted a 4-day event in Jamaica called the Ronnie Mund Jamaican Getaway.

Mund retired as Stern’s limo driver in late 2020, sold his long time Queens, New York home and retired to Las Vegas the following year. He continues to make guest appearances on the show remotely.

==== Will Murray ====
Will Murray is the show's researcher and segment producer. He pre-interviews all guests, and compiles pages of notes of research for Howard to use during on-air interviews. He and fellow producer Jason Kaplan hosted the Howard 100 News segment "Page 69."

On September 5, 2008, Will married his long-time girlfriend. A Philadelphia area native, he is a huge Philadelphia sports fan, and is a graduate of Syracuse University.

==== Marci Turk ====
Marci Turk is chief operating officer of Stern's channels, but her name is not used on the air. A former employee of author David Allen, she is a prominent advocator of his Getting Things Done method of time management.

== Former staff and associates ==
The following people all saw significant air-time when they worked with Stern. Some were show staffers who left for other careers. Some had been interns, Stern's bosses, and station support staff who for a time were all integral to the show.

=== Former radio staff ===
==== K. C. Armstrong ====
K. C. Armstrong

Kyle Casey "K. C." Armstrong (born July 17, 1975), who grew up in nearby Suffolk County, New York, had been a college football player. He began working on the show as an intern in 1997 and later became associate producer from 1998 to 2004. In a 2005 interview, Armstrong revealed that he had been fired from the show by WXRK general manager Tom Chiusano for lapsing back into drug use after spending time in rehab.

Armstrong was needled by Stern for his good looks and athletic body. Some show staffers, jealous of his appearance, speculated that if he is that good-looking, he must be gay. Armstrong eventually moved to California, where he tried to start a career in acting. He released a comedy DVD called Die Laughing. He has acted in three movies, Death4Told, Grace and the Storm, and Secret War, and appears on the comedy DVD series Meet the Creeps.

==== Lee Davis ====
"Boy" Lee Davis was the original Stern show producer at WNBC before Gary Dell'Abate. He left to become the producer of the Soupy Sales show. He moved up the ladder in station management and eventually became the general manager of sports radio station WFAN, which was the successor to WNBC at AM 660 in New York.

==== Shuli Egar ====
Shuli Egar is a comedian who first appeared on the show in June 2003. When Stern announced his planned move to Sirius and created Howard 100 News in 2005, Egar was an early hire. He was promoted to reporting about and keeping tabs on The Wack Pack. He also filled in for Lisa G and Steve Langford when they were out.

In September 2020, Egar abruptly moved to Alabama from New York City out of concern for his family, who felt unsafe in their neighborhood due to the ongoing COVID-19 pandemic and civil unrest caused by the George Floyd protests. Egar did not inform Stern of his relocation until he had already finished moving, though SiriusXM management was made aware and approved of the move. With all content for the Howard Stern Channels being created remotely rather than at the SiriusXM headquarters in New York during the pandemic, Egar was still able to contribute to the show.

On January 22, 2021, Egar announced on Twitter he was launching a podcast through Patreon. In the first episode of his podcast, Egar stated he was no longer happy working at the show and had not been for several years. He felt the content he was creating was being sidelined too frequently, and that he was not allowed on the air as frequently as he would have liked to be. After his move to Alabama, Egar claimed show producers took him off the assignment of covering the Wack Pack, his longtime primary role at the show. Egar resigned from the show, saying that he and the staff at the Stern Show, including Stern himself, were still on good terms, and that Stern called him upon learning of his resignation to wish him well. At the time of his departure, Egar was the only original member of the Howard 100 News team that remained on staff.

==== Steve Freid ====
Steve "the Engineer" Freid first worked with Ben Stern and later worked with Howard when he arrived at K-Rock. He gained notoriety performing as the character Wood Yi, a parody of actor/director Woody Allen. Billy West came up with the idea for the character in the early 1990s, and Steve was chosen to play the part due to having a similar-sounding voice. When performing as Wood Yi, Steve read lines supplied to him by the shows' staff, reciting them in a deadpan manner.

==== Gary Garver ====
Gary Garver was a West Coast-based correspondent for The Howard Stern Show who first started working for the show in 1991 when he was an operator at KLSX, the show's Los Angeles affiliate. He was sent to awards shows, movie premieres and television conventions to ask "Stuttering John"-type questions to celebrities and has-beens.

==== Steve Grillo ====
Former Stern Show intern and associate producer at WXRK, known as "Gorilla". Howard dedicated his second book Miss America to Steve. Grillo conducted movie reviews for Howard 100 News in 2006. As homage to his former duties as a Stern show intern, he rated films by awarding them a certain number of potatoes.

==== Artie Lange ====
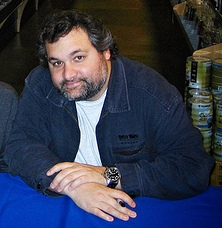
Artie Lange

Lange's first appearance on the show was as a guest alongside fellow comedian Norm Macdonald on January 8, 1998, following a bit involving Scott the Engineer and his challenge to perform 17 complete push-ups. Although appearing with Macdonald to promote the film Dirty Work, Lange had been a fan of Stern since the 1980s when he used to listen with his father. In fact, after Lange's father was paralyzed in 1987, show producer Gary Dell'Abate sent Lange an autographed jacket which Lange auctioned off for $2,000 to help support his family.

Following the departure of the show's writer and comedian Jackie "The Jokeman" Martling in 2001, several comedians "auditioned" for Martling's seat by sitting in for a couple of shows. Lange's first appearance in what became known as "The Jackie Chair" occurred for 2 days, on May 7 and 8, 2001. The temporary appearance consisted of being Stern's sidekick along with Quivers, and Lange frequently told personal stories, usually regarding alcohol, drugs, food and prostitutes. On October 29, 2001, Lange joined the show full-time and was voted favorite by Howard's fans in 2009.

Lange left the show in December 2009. At first the leave was thought to be temporary, but in early 2010 he attempted suicide at his apartment in Hoboken, New Jersey. The incident has not been discussed in great detail on the show and for much of 2010, Stern mentioned that Lange would return when he was healthy. However, in 2011 the show and the Howard 100 News began to reference Lange as a "former" staffer. On October 3, 2011, Lange began co-hosting The Nick & Artie Show with comedian Nick Di Paolo. This show aired on Directv. In April 2014, Artie was informed before the show that Directv had cancelled his show. He went on air that night for the last time as a part of the Directv team. He currently is the host of a podcast called "The Artie Lange Uncensored Podcast."

==== John Melendez ====
In 1988, Stuttering John was attending New York University's film school, and belonged to a band called "Rock Slide". His college roommate, Mitch Fatel, was on the verge of quitting his internship with The Howard Stern Show, when Melendez begged him for a recommendation for an internship on the show. Producer Gary Dell'Abate interviewed Melendez and mentioned his stuttering problem to Stern, who decided to hire him as a field reporter.

On Stern's show, Melendez conducted outrageous street interviews and appeared at press conferences, asking off-the-wall questions to various celebrities, including Gennifer Flowers, Ringo Starr, Burt Reynolds, Tommy Lasorda, Larry King and the Dalai Lama. He also provided comic relief on the show itself with his misadventures, poor grammar, and sloppy pronunciation. Melendez left the show after being offered a half-million-dollar contract as the announcer for The Tonight Show with Jay Leno.

==== Al Rosenberg ====
Al Rosenberg was a writer/performer for Howard on WNBC. He did numerous voice impressions including Sue Simmons and Dr. Ruth Westheimer. In The History of Howard Stern, Howard stated that he hired Al after Imus fired him so that he (Imus) could hire his girlfriend to replace Rosenberg. He stayed on at WNBC after Howard was fired because he was still under contract to the station. Al also worked on WNEW-AM radio as one half of the morning team with Bob Fitzsimmons. He also worked with Ted Brown. He later worked again for Howard on the "Channel 9 Show" as a writer. Al called into Stern's show in 2007 (during a Paul Mooney interview) to discuss Imus' racism. He also appeared on Howard 101's defunct "Miserable Men" program.

He served on the board of Rise, a non-profit organization and served as Deputy Mayor for East Windsor Township, New Jersey.

Al died in late June 2023 at 78 years old. Howard, Robin, Fred and Gary all spoke fondly of him while remembering him on air after his death. He was specifically praised for supporting Howard and the show at WNBC.

==== Scott Salem ====
Scott the Engineer was the show's long-time engineer, having joined on February 10, 1986. Having previously worked at WABC (AM) and WPLJ in New York City, Salem received a voice mail from Jimmy Fink, then the morning personality at WXRK informing him of his new position.

In 1996, the Austin American-Statesman wrote that Scott is "always threatening to quit or on the verge of being fired, he's the show's whipping boy for technical problems". In 2007, Salem made a onetime appearance on tour with the "Killers of Comedy," performing stand-up followed by a Q&A session with the audience. Salem is an avid bowler and has competed in and appeared at several PBA tour events.

==== Ron Tarrant ====
Ron Tarrant joined the Howard Stern Channels in 2016 from Canada as the Head Imaging/Sound Designer & new voice of the Howard Stern Show/Channels. He left the show in 2019.

==== Billy West ====
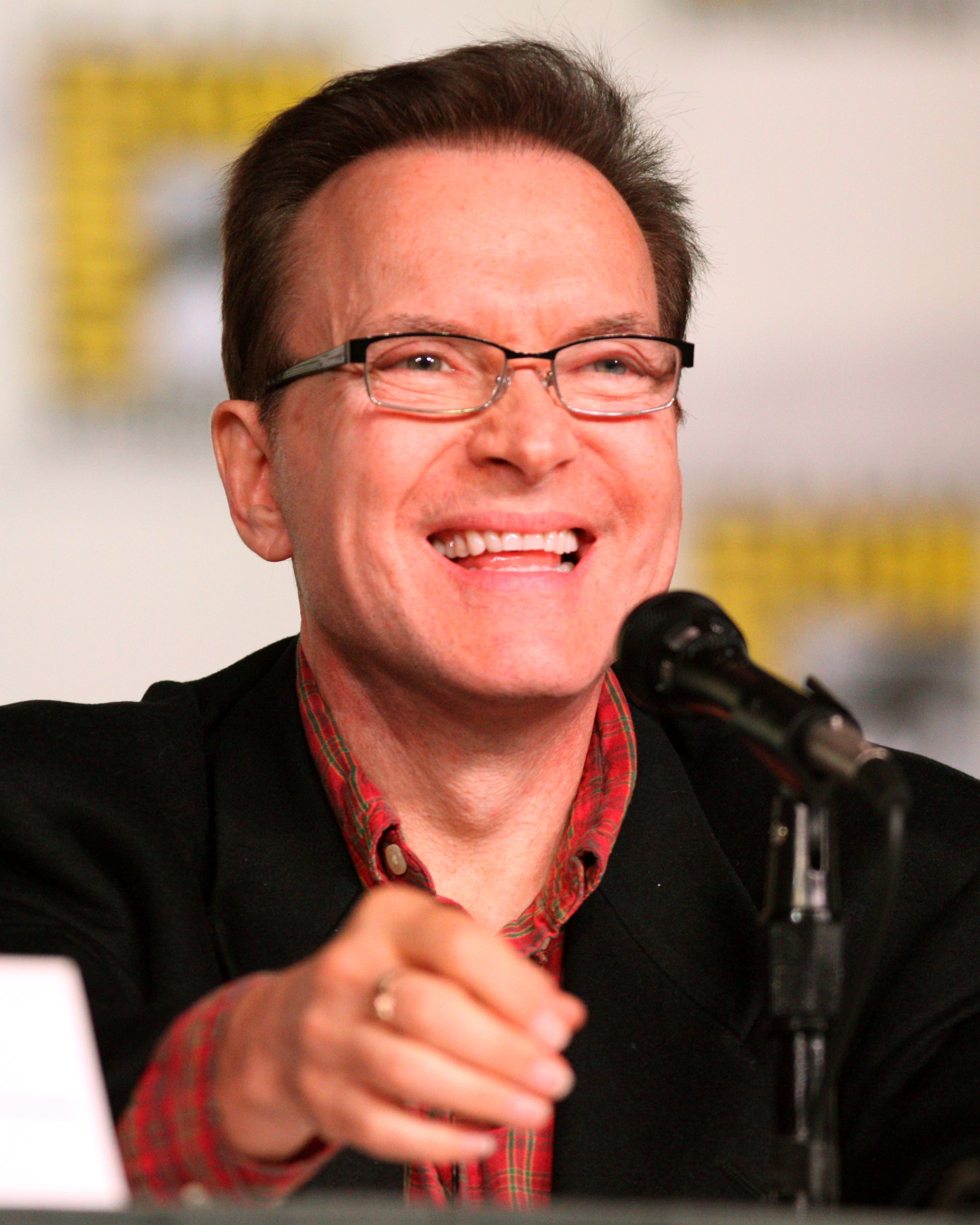
Billy West

Billy West provided the show with comedy impersonations, part-time, beginning on November 7, 1988. He was known for his impressions of Marge Schott and show comedian Jackie Martling. West's final appearance was on November 1, 1995, before he left the show over contract and salary disputes. On February 19 and 20, 2007, a special two-part retrospective of West's work on the show was broadcast on Howard 100 and Howard 101, covering over 11 hours.

West was an occasional contributor to The Adam Carolla Show, a syndicated morning radio show that replaced Stern in cities along the West Coast.

==== Benjy Bronk ====
Benjy Bronk (born September 4, 1967) began working on The Howard Stern Show as an intern in 1998. Bronk eventually earned a paid position conducting pre-interviews of show guests and gathering articles for Robin Quivers’ newscasts. In 2000, Benjy was given an in-studio seat next to writers Jackie Martling and Fred Norris, writing on-the-spot jokes for Stern as the show transpired.

After Martling left the show in 2001, Bronk continued as an in-studio joke writer with Norris. When The Howard Stern Show moved to Sirius satellite radio in January 2006, Bronk continued his role as an in-studio joke writer. Bronk stopped writing in-studio after arriving late on October 26, 2016. Bronk was laid off in July 2026 alongside many other staffers due to the show reducing to only one show per week meaning less production staff was needed.

==== Mike Trainor ====
Mike Trainor joined the show in 2014 as writer and producer. He became prominent on the show as a voice of a lump that was growing on Wack Packer Jeff the Drunk. His name was not often used on the program as he was often referred to on the air as “Lump”. However, that changed in recent years. Trainor was laid off in July 2026 alongside many other staffers due to the show reducing to only one show per week meaning less production staff was needed.

=== Former radio associates ===
==== Bubba Clem ====
Bubba the Love Sponge is both the title of, and name of the host of, a radio show airing on Howard 101 from 2005 to the end of 2010. Bubba (actual legal name Bubba The Love Sponge Clem, born Todd Clem) had previously been "exiled" from radio after a great deal of controversy over his terrestrial radio show, based in Tampa, Florida. Stern brought Bubba's show aboard and in so doing relaunched Bubba's career and show. Bubba credits Stern for reviving his career.

The show left Sirius XM at the end of 2010 and moved to RadioIO Internet Radio and syndicated terrestrial radio.

==== Donna Fiducia ====
Donna Fiducia was an on-air traffic reporter on WNBC radio during Stern's tenure there. They had frequent conversations while she was on the air, sometimes leaving her no time to actually deliver the traffic report.

==== Rev. Bob Levy ====
"Reverend" Bob Levy is a standup comedian who was a frequent on and off air contributor to the Sirius XM radio show from the show's debut until around 2009. He hosted the Miserable Men show and created a series of roasts for Stern show personalities such as Gary Dell'Abate, Artie Lange, and Wack Packers such as Daniel Carver. The placement, frequency and number of plugs given during the Stern show for Levy's off-air efforts was a constant source of tension, especially after the availability of plugs was severely restricted. After Artie's departure, Levy complained on air that some details of the situation were being "covered up" and blamed Howard Stern for the suicide attempt. Levy's departure from the Stern channels soon followed and he is almost never mentioned on the air.

=== Former Howard 101 hosts ===
==== Scott Ferrall ====
Scott Ferrall was the host of The Scott Ferrall Show heard weekdays at 8 pm EST on Howard 101. It aired from 2006 to 2012.

==== Greg Fitzsimmons ====
Greg Fitzsimmons hosted The Greg Fitzsimmons Show on Howard 101 from 2006–2018.

==== Abe Kanan ====
Abe Kanan was host of The Abe Kanan Show, which aired on Howard 101 weekends and late nights. Kanan's show originated in Chicago. It began as a series of podcasts and was picked up by the Stern channels in February 2011 and lasted until December 2013. He now hosts his own podcast titled "Abe Kanan On Hold".

==== Riley Martin ====
Riley Martin (May 9, 1946 – December 2015) was a self-described alien contactee, author, and host of The Riley Martin Show, which was heard Tuesdays at Midnight ET on Howard 101.

==== Jackie Martling ====
Jackie Martling is the former head writer and in-studio laugh track of The Howard Stern Show. He was later the host of Jackie's Joke Hunt. The show, co-hosted by fellow Friar Ian Karr, premiered on October 3, 2006, at 7 pm EST. It aired live, every Tuesday at 7 pm ET on Sirius Howard 101, with reruns heard Thursday mornings at 12 am ET and Saturday afternoons at 2 pm ET. Jackie's Joke Hunt was canceled along with many other shows that have been cut during 2014–2015, when Sirius 101 began to focus only on past shows from the Howard Stern library.

==== Mutt ====
Mutt is the founder of the Stern Fan Network message board and was host of The Super Fan Roundtable, which had been heard Wednesday's at 7 pm ET on Howard 101.

==== Red Peters ====
Red Peters was the host of The Red Peters Music Comedy Hour which aired periodically on Howard 101. Peters (real name Douglas Stevens) is a Boston-based songwriter/comedian who specializes in a musical form best described as "lounge smut." His show featured a compilation of songs packed with scat jokes and double-entendres.

==== Jeff Probst & Natalie Maines ====
Jeff Probst is best known for his role as the host of the U.S. version of the reality show Survivor and Natalie Maines is best known as the lead singer of The Dixie Chicks. Together after each season of Survivor has wrapped-up they host a two-hour Celebrity Superfan Roundtable on Howard 101, where they bring in big-name Hollywood stars such as actor David Arquette, LA weatherbabe Jillian Reynolds, producer Damon Lindelof, singer Mark McGrath, actor Jerry O'Connell, actor Ryan Phillippe, comedian Sarah Silverman, and actor Steven Weber to discuss their favorite moments on the Stern show.

==== Jay Thomas ====
Jay Thomas was the host of The Jay Thomas Show on Howard 101 from 2005 until his 2017 death.

==== Chuck Zito ====
Chuck Zito is an actor, amateur boxer, martial artist, celebrity bodyguard, stuntman, former boxing trainer and former president of the New York City chapter of the Hells Angels. He hosted the periodic Chuck Zito's View on Howard 101.

=== Former Howard 100 News staff ===
==== Penny Crone ====
Penny Crone was a correspondent on Howard 100 News. She had been a field reporter for many years on Channel 5 WNYM, the Fox network affiliate in New York and later was the morning co-host on WABC 770 AM.

==== Brad Driver ====
Brad Driver was the News Director at Howard 100 News and was responsible for managing the news team. He has held the position since December 2006.

==== Lisa Glasberg ====
Lisa Glasberg was a former co-host with Doctor Dré and Ed Lover on New York hip-hop radio station Hot 97 WQHT-FM. She was known informally as Lisa G, serving as an on-air reporter for Howard 100 until February 2015, updating live news headlines each morning and filing reports for hourly Howard 100 news updates. Glasberg is a native of Woodmere, New York.

==== Ralph Howard ====
The late Ralph Howard anchored Howard 100 News every weekday afternoon. He had previously been a news anchor on New York radio stations WINS 1010 AM and WMCA 570 AM. In September 2010, he underwent lung transplant surgery. He retired from the show on May 30, 2013 after 53 years of news broadcasting. Howard was married to Broadway actress and longtime Charles Busch collaborator, Julie Halston.

==== Steve Langford ====
Steve Langford had been a field reporter on WCBS-TV Channel 2 and other local TV news departments. He became an investigative reporter for Howard 100 News. He later returned to local TV news.

==== Jon Leiberman ====
Jon Leiberman was an in-studio and remote correspondent for Howard 100 News who was hired in July 2011.

==== Michael Morales ====
Michael "High Pitch Mike" Morales was Howard 100 News producer, reporter, and on-air regular. He publicly came out as gay on the show. Mike has an unusual, squeaky voice, leading to his nickname.

=== TV staff ===
==== Ralph Cirella ====
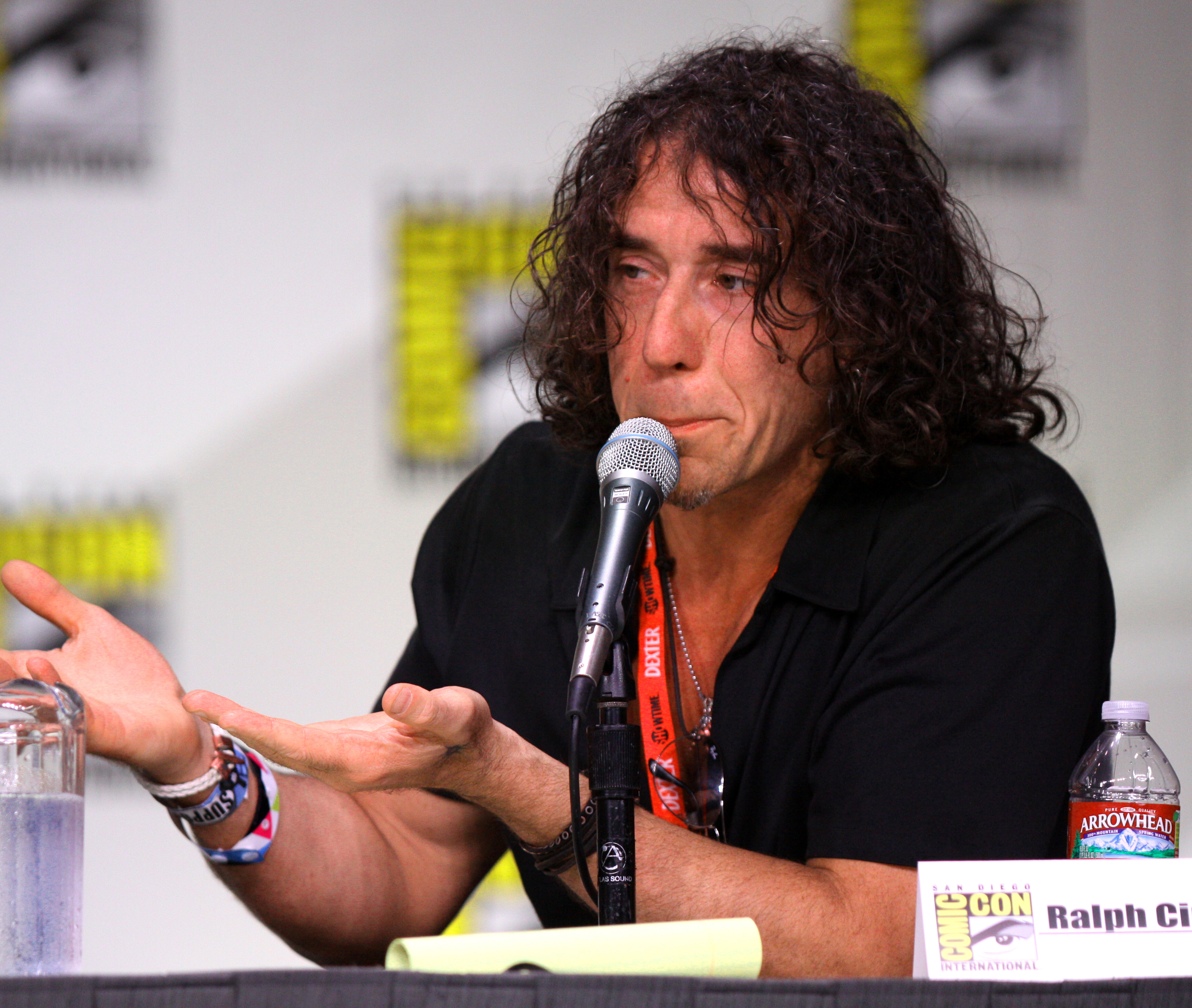
Ralph Cirella

Ralph Cirella was paid by Howard TV to be Howard Stern's personal stylist, a job he previously held for Stern's E! show. Cirella was first hired to construct a "talking penis" for a broadcast at the Felt Forum on New Year's Eve, 1986. He had been a listener since Stern's time at WNBC from 1982 to 1985. Cirella did not make on-screen appearances until 1990, when he worked on costumes, special effects and make up on The Howard Stern Show on WWOR-TV. In his book, Miss America, Howard Stern calls Ralph the most universally hated member of his staff. Throughout 2006, Cirella briefly co-hosted the now-defunct The Friday Show with Gary Dell'Abate and Jon Hein on Howard 100 and Howard 101. He was also the host of "Geek Time", which aired on Howard 101.

Cirella died on December 5, 2023, at age 58.

==== Scott DePace ====
Scott DePace was the television director for the daily broadcast of The Howard Stern Show for Howard TV. His wife, Pamela, won an Emmy for her work on The Daily Show.

==== Scott Einziger ====
Scott Einziger is a former Producer of Stern's syndicated Saturday night TV show and E! show. Left the show in November 2001 to become a producer on The Amazing Race. He has since worked on other reality shows such as Kid Nation, Big Brother, and Are You Hot?. Stern sued Einziger and his production company for ripping off his "The Evaluators" which Are You Hot? mirrored.

==== Mike Gange ====
Mike Gange started at the show as an intern, and, after years of toil, worked his way up to cameraman/interviewer for the former Stern TV show on E! Gange then became supervising producer for Howard TV.

==== Doug Goodstein ====
Doug Z. Goodstein was Stern's E! show producer and executive producer for Howard TV On Demand.

==== Robin Radzinski ====
Robin Radzinski is a former E! network executive and former Producer of Stern's E! show who has also worked for G4, HBO, and TBS.

=== Former bosses ===
==== Randy Bongarten ====
Randy Bongarten is a radio executive and former Vice-President and General Manager at WNBC who was later promoted to be President of the entire NBC Radio Network. Robin Quivers said that Randy's tenure at WNBC were the "good years" at the station because Randy "understood the show, and was interested in letting the talent do the things that would let the talent be successful."

==== Tom Chiusano ====
Tom Chiusano was the general manager at WXRK, the frequent target of Stern show jokes, and in the later years of the show the master of the "dump button" to prevent content he deemed inappropriate from reaching the airwaves. Chiusano remained at WXRK when Stern and company moved to Sirius, and after several format changes at his station, he eventually announced his retirement in January 2008.

==== John Hayes ====
John Hayes is a radio executive, famously named "The Incubus" by Howard during his days as Vice-President and General Manager at WNBC replacing Randy Bongarten. He and Kevin Metheny were portrayed by Paul Giamatti as a composite character under the name Kenny "Pig Vomit" Rushton in the 1997 movie, Private Parts. It was Hayes who actually fired Stern from WNBC-AM in 1985 on the orders of NBC network executives. In 2002, Hayes once again pulled Stern's show from CILQ-FM in Toronto. Hayes proudly calls himself "the man who fired Howard Stern twice."

==== Kevin Metheny ====
Kevin Metheny (June 6, 1954 – October 3, 2014) was a radio executive, famously named "Pig Virus" by Howard during his days as Program Director at WNBC. He and his replacement John Hayes were portrayed by Paul Giamatti as a composite character under the name Kenny "Pig Vomit" Rushton in the 1997 movie, Private Parts.

==== Tim Sabean ====
Tim Sabean was the Senior Vice President of the Howard Stern Channels for Howard 100 & 101. He managed the channels and their personnel for Howard. Before coming to Sirius he was the program director at Stern's Philadelphia affiliate WYSP-FM. Sabean's departure from the show was never formally announced, but he is no longer listed as a staff or front office member on the Stern show website. The last entry on his official Twitter feed was on August 1, 2013, and his last on-air appearance was around that time.

On September 9, 2013, Sirius/XM announced that he would be promoted to Senior Vice President of all the Entertainment and Comedy channels.
