= John Melendez =

American radio personality and comedian

- Born: October 4, 1965 (age 61); Massapequa, New York, United States
- Other name: Stuttering John
- Occupations: Radio personality; singer; actor; writer; announcer; podcaster; internet lolcow
- Years active: 1988–present
- Spouse: Suzanna Keller (m. 1997; div. 2012)
- Children: 3

John Edward Melendez (born October 4, 1965), also known as Stuttering John, is an American entertainer.

He is best known for being a staff member on The Howard Stern Show from 1988 to 2004. Initially working as an intern, Melendez became known for asking celebrities impertinent questions at events and press conferences with his stuttering. He left the show to become the announcer on The Tonight Show with Jay Leno and also worked on Leno's later shows. He has presented The Stuttering John Podcast since 2018.

== Early life ==
Melendez grew up in Massapequa, New York, on Long Island and attended Plainedge High School. Melendez was born to a Puerto Rican father and a Danish mother. According to Melendez, he began to stutter when he was in the second grade as a result of psychological mistreatment from his father after he witnessed an argument between his parents. He attended Plainedge High School, graduating in 1983, where he was picked on by the neighborhood bullies because of his stuttering. In 1988, Melendez attended New York University's film school and belonged to a band called "Rock Slide." His college roommate, comedian Mitch Fatel, was on the verge of quitting his internship with The Howard Stern Show, when Melendez asked him for a recommendation for an internship there. The show's producer, Gary Dell'Abate, mentioned Melendez's stuttering to Howard Stern who, without seeing him and even before he was interviewed, told the producer to hire him.

== Career ==
=== 1988–2004: The Howard Stern Show ===
On Stern's show, Melendez's primary role was answering phones and screening listener calls before they were allowed on the air. At the time of his joining, in addition to being heard in the New York City and Philadelphia radio markets via Infinity Broadcasting Corporation-owned WXRK 92.3 K-Rock and WYSP Rock94, respectively, the nationally syndicated morning drive time show had just added Washington, D.C.'s WJFK (also owned by Infinity) as its third carrier.

Over time, Melendez became known for segments in which he asked celebrities confrontational questions at red carpet events, functions, promotional appearances, and press conferences. The puerile questions—written by Howard Stern, Fred Norris, and Jackie Martling—centered around a given celebrity's private life and were premised on the idea that they would not want to look bad by refusing an interview from someone who stuttered. Melendez sported long hair and metal T-shirts, asking questions by reading them from a sheet of paper. As he became better known, he occasionally wore a disguise consisting of an overcoat, fedora, and fake mustache. His interviews were characterized by punchline-free "joke" questions, such as asking actress Melanie Griffith how her father, Andy, was.

The absurdity of the questions Melendez asked was often amplified by the fact that he himself appeared to lack common pop culture knowledge and often did not even seem to know who the subjects of his interview were or why they were famous. Melendez would thus frequently be unaware of why his questions would provoke such angry reactions, such as when he asked Ally Sheedy if she had vomited lately, unaware that the actress suffered from bulimia. Some celebrities were a personal target of Stern's, such as Ted Williams, who was interviewed by Melendez because Stern disapproved of athletes charging money for autographs. Celebrities would often react angrily, but other times, they would take the questions in good humor.

Melendez notably interviewed Gennifer Flowers, Ringo Starr, and the Dalai Lama. At Gennifer Flowers' news conference playing the 'Clinton Tapes', he asked her if she planned to sleep with any other candidates before the election, to which she reacted by laughing. He asked the Dalai Lama if anyone ever greeted him with "Hello Dalai!", in a joking reference to the play and movie; the Dalai Lama's translator whispered the translation to the Dalai Lama, who chuckled. At a press conference, Melendez asked Ringo Starr, "What did you do with the money?" When Starr asked, "What money?" Melendez responded with "The money your mother gave you for singing lessons!" Starr good-naturedly replied, "I spent it on fish and chips." Singer Debbie Gibson also went along with the joke when Melendez asked her about losing an award to Wilson Phillips, jokingly agreeing with his idea that "the fat one would eat the statue." Melendez also provided comic interest with his misadventures, poor grammar, and sloppy pronunciation.

==== National exposure ====
Melendez started receiving American national exposure in the early 1990s as Stern's syndicated morning radio show acquired more markets (including Los Angeles and Cleveland) and particularly from June 1994 when its condensed version began airing nightly on E!: Entertainment Television, a basic cable network with national coverage in the United States. In 1994, Melendez signed a record contract with Atlantic Records and released his self-titled album with a music video broadcast on MTV's Headbangers Ball. That year, he was being paid $20,000 annually by the Stern show, which had 15 million listeners.

In 1995, Melendez joined the late-night talk show Last Call as a co-host.

During his 15-year run as Stern's employee, Melendez also starred in the Off-Broadway show Tony n' Tina's Wedding where he met his future wife, Suzanna. He appeared in such films as Airheads, Meet Wally Sparks, Dude, Where's My Car?, and Osmosis Jones, as well as Howard Stern's film Private Parts. He has also appeared on television in episodes of Wings, Baywatch Nights, and the 2003 United States version of the reality series I'm a Celebrity... Get Me Out Of Here!.

Melendez was also the protagonist of some of the show's more outrageous moments. In 2001, during A.J. Benza's appearance, Melendez got slapped in the face by Benza who did not appreciate the incessant lampooning of his failed late-night show, seeing Melendez as the main culprit. The on-air slap prompted an extended fracas and resulted in Benza being permanently banned from Stern's show.

Throughout the early part of 2002, Melendez and WXRK afternoon deejay Lee Mroszak (aka "Crazy Cabbie") had numerous on-air spats, which were used by Stern as fodder for multiple segments on the show. Their feud eventually culminated in a boxing match scheduled for Friday morning May 31, 2002, at Trump Taj Mahal in Atlantic City and was promoted on the show as "The Flunky versus the Junkie" with 2,500 tickets going on sale for $100 each. The 7 a.m. fight, essentially an extended segment on the show which itself was broadcast from around the ring that morning, was set for five two-minute rounds with a two-minute break in between each round. It went the distance, with the 175 lb Melendez winning over the 262 lb Cabbie by unanimous decision.

Following a guest appearance on The Tonight Show to promote I'm a Celebrity...Get Me Out of Here! in 2003, Melendez received an offer from Jay Leno to become the late-night show's New York 'correspondent' who would ask celebrities questions on the red carpet, similar to one of his roles on the Stern show. Melendez claimed that he turned down the offer because he could not get a private conversation with Stern to ask him about it. Stern later claimed how "lame" an idea it was for Leno to reuse Melendez the way Leno wanted to (in a less edgy way).

In parallel with his duties on the Stern show in the morning, Melendez got a daily afternoon show on New York City's WXRK (The Howard Stern Show flagship station) from noon to 1 pm called Out to Lunch, consisting mostly of taking musical requests by e-mail and playing them. The show was taped in 15 minutes, with the email and phone call requests being entirely fictional. The show was canceled on August 21, 2003, with Stern turning the announced cancellation into a 45-minute segment at the end of his live broadcast that day by having WXRK program director Robert Cross (aka Chuck Roast) come in and break the bad news on the air to Melendez.

==== Leaving the show ====
In February 2004, the New York Post revealed that Melendez had been offered the announcer position on The Tonight Show with Jay Leno behind Stern's back while Stern's show was on vacation. Many perceived the move as an attempt by Jay Leno to attract a younger demographic. Melendez's offer, which was made without Stern's knowledge, prompted a rift between Stern and Leno. Stern berated Leno on his show for weeks on end, with insults such as "To an 18- to 25-year-old male, Jay Leno is gay. He might as well put a dress on," as well as accusations that Leno was "ripping him off."

Following Melendez's departure, Stern organized an on-air contest to find his replacement. Billed as "Win John's Job" (much like "Win Jackie's Money" after writer Jackie Martling walked out), the contest resulted in the hiring of Sal Governale (aka "Sal the Stockbroker") and Richard Christy, although for several years, L.A. radio disc-jockey "Scary Gary" (from 97.1 KSLX, which played Stern's radio show in Southern California) did Stuttering John style interviews that Stern would play on his show. Also, in his later years on the Stern show, John had become too recognizable for the type of celebrity interviews for which he became niche-famous.

==== 2020–2022 publicity right lawsuit against Sirius XM ====
In August 2020, Melendez sued the Liberty Media-majority-owned satellite and online radio platform SiriusXM Holdings Inc. for "using his name, likeness, and voice without permission" on its two channels dedicated to The Howard Stern Show and related content. Filed in the Manhattan-based U.S. district court, the complaint sought unspecified damages for Sirius XM's airing of old recordings of Melendez from his time on The Howard Stern Show, with Melendez claiming such action violated California law and his right of publicity while further estimating that more than 13,000 hours of the then-syndicated morning radio show feature his voice, name and identity which Sirius XM benefits from by selling advertising without compensating him.

Melendez's lawsuit was dismissed in June 2021 by the U.S. District Judge Paul A. Crotty who ruled that U.S. federal copyright law preempted Melendez's claims that Sirius XM violated his publicity rights under California law. The judge's written ruling further stated that Melendez did not show he was injured or that Sirius XM illegally used him to promote its services, adding that "the commercial advantage Sirius XM gains from playing The Howard Stern Show archives and running the advertisements flows from the rebroadcasting of the copyrightable sound recordings themselves, not from Melendez's identity”. Melendez's lawyer commented that the judge “adopted a unique analytic framework which we believe is inconsistent with prevailing law" while announcing the intention to appeal the ruling. The appeal was dismissed by a three-judge panel in October 2022.

=== 2004–2014: Jay Leno's shows ===
==== The Tonight Show with Jay Leno ====
Melendez debuted on The Tonight Show on March 29, 2004, taking over for Edd Hall. On the show, he was identified simply as "John Melendez" as opposed to "Stuttering John."

In late September 2004, only six months after Melendez joined the show, NBC announced that Leno would be succeeded by Conan O'Brien in 2009. Throughout his 2004–2009 run on the Tonight Show, Melendez regularly appeared in the show's comedy sketches and did correspondent pieces. By July 2008, Leno's last Tonight Show was set for 29 May 2009.

In December 2008, with the end of Leno's run on the Tonight Show nearing, NBC (led by the NBCUniversal president and CEO, Jeff Zucker) announced the launch of The Jay Leno Show, a new prime time 10 p.m. Monday-to-Friday talk show set to premiere in September 2009. With Leno's final Tonight broadcast imminent, during spring 2009, Melendez was uncertain whether he'd have a place on Leno's upcoming prime time show, stating in a May 2009 interview: "After May 29 I get on my knees and pray and hope Jay brings me to the new show". Melendez's ambiguous job status with Leno even prompted a sarcastic job offer from his former boss Stern. In late July 2009, Melendez was confirmed as a writer on upcoming The Jay Leno Show. Confirmation of his status on Leno's new prime time show came later than that of Eubanks, weeks after the end of Leno's tenure on The Tonight Show, which led to speculation that Melendez would not appear at all.

==== The Jay Leno Show ====
In September 2009, Melendez reunited with Leno and former Tonight bandleader Kevin Eubanks as a member of the writing staff on The Jay Leno Show.

When asked about Melendez's new role, Leno stated that Melendez would appear in comedy segments during the show and that the new show would not have a studio announcer; that role would eventually be cast with Wally Wingert taking the position. On The Tonight Show, Leno described his interplay with Melendez as "awkward," saying "I'd throw to Kevin Eubanks, and I'd throw to John, and I realized that my guy is Eubanks."

==== Return of The Tonight Show with Jay Leno ====
Just like previously on The Jay Leno Show, with the return of Leno's The Tonight Show in March 2010, Melendez continued in the writing role. Melendez did not return as an announcer on the second incarnation of The Tonight Show with Jay Leno, with Jay Leno Show announcer Wally Wingert keeping his; Melendez instead was employed as a staff writer and occasional on-air segment host until Leno's departure from The Tonight Show on February 6, 2014.

=== 2014–present ===
==== The Stuttering John Podcast and Trump prank call ====
In April 2018, he launched his new podcast, The Stuttering John Podcast. During Melendez's podcast on June 28, 2018, he prank-called the White House by pretending to be an assistant to Senator from New Jersey, Bob Menendez. Melendez ultimately received a call back from President Donald Trump as he was traveling on Air Force One. Melendez then impersonated Senator Menendez and had a four-minute conversation focusing on immigration reform and the Supreme Court vacancy. Notably, President Trump was congratulatory regarding the outcome of Senator Menendez's ethics lawsuit The White House has confirmed the security breach.

On July 2, 2018, Melendez announced that he had retained lawyer Michael Avenatti to represent him in relation to the prank call after being visited by Secret Service agents over the previous weekend.

==== "Dabbleverse" and 2025 lawsuit ====
In the 2020s, Melendez managed to become the centerpiece of an online community dubbed the "Dabbleverse", a space devoted almost entirely to ridiculing his amateur podcasting and attempts at comedy. The name itself is a jab at his apparent inability to commit to anything beyond surface-level effort; something Melendez took deep offense to when people pointed out he merely "dabbled" in stand-up, rather than ever truly doing it well. In August 2025, Melendez escalated things by suing two podcasters, including former Stern Show staffer Shuli Egar, claiming they recorded his calls, used his likeness, and turned his discarded personal items into props to mock him for profit at a comedy event called "Dabblecon 2" in Rochester, New York. The lawsuit only added more fuel to the spectacle. On October 12th, 2026, Inside Radio reported that New York judge Justice Vincent M. Dinolfo ruled entirely in favor of the defendants under New York's anti-SLAPP statute and ordered Melendez to pay their legal fees.

In February 2026, Melendez headlined at Rodney's Comedy Club and, upon spotting radio personality Anthony Cumia in the room, read Cumia's public arrest record. The crowd turned openly hostile, and finally ended the stunt when an audience member physically took the papers out of his hands.

==== Published work ====
Melendez's book Easy for You to Say was released in October 2018.

== Personal life ==
After moving to California in 2004 to work on The Tonight Show, Melendez lived in Calabasas with his wife Suzanna Keller and their three children. The couple filed for separation in October 2011 and divorced in 2012.

== Discography ==
Albums

- Stuttering John (Atlantic Records, 1994)
- Everybody's Normal But Me (Razor & Tie, 1998)

Singles

- "Gypsy Morning" (Atlantic Records, 1994)
- "I'll Talk My Way Out of It" (Atlantic Records, 1995)
- "Strawberry Fields Forever" (Jellyfish, 1995)
- "Pretty Girl" (Razor & Tie, 1998)

== Filmography ==
Actor

- Airheads (1994)
- Wings, episode "Olive or Twist" (1996)
- Baywatch Nights (1996)
- Thin Blood (1996)
- Private Parts (1997)
- Meet Wally Sparks (1997)
- Dude, Where's My Car? (2000)
- Osmosis Jones (2001)
- True Crime: New York City (2005)
- Tripping the Rift: The Movie (2008)
- One, Two, Many (2008)
- Not Another Not Another Movie (2012)

Writer

- The Howard Stern Radio Show
- One, Two, Many (2008)
- The Tonight Show with Jay Leno (2010–2014)
- Kareem Abdul Jabbar Roast (2013)

== See also ==
List of Puerto Ricans

Media offices
Preceded by Edd Hall	The Tonight Show announcer 2004–2009	Succeeded by Andy Richter
