= The History of Howard Stern =

- Genre: Documentary
- Running time: 4-6 hours per episode
- Country of origin: United States
- Home station: Howard 100 and Howard 101
- Starring: Howard Stern; Robin Quivers; Fred Norris; Gary Dell'Abate
- Announcer: Jim Forbes
- Original release: December 17, 2007 – December 31, 2010
- No. of episodes: 35
- Opening theme: "Rebel Rebel" by David Bowie

The History of Howard Stern is a radio documentary series about the life and career of American radio personality Howard Stern, covering the years from his childhood through The tragic events of September 11, 2001. It originally aired across 35 episodes in four "acts" on Howard 100 on SiriusXM Radio between December 17, 2007 and December 31, 2010. Each episode includes segments from The Howard Stern Show, interviews with the show's staff, celebrity guests, and his family, and excerpts of news reports. The series is narrated by Jim Forbes.

In 2008, the series won a Communicator Award. Act III was given a Silver World Medal award at the 2010 International Radio Programming and Promotion Awards in the History category. An additional episode covering the show's final two years on terrestrial radio in 2004 and 2005 aired in July 2015.

== Background ==
On June 7, 2006, Stern announced on his show that the lawsuit settlement with CBS Radio (formerly Infinity Broadcasting) finally gave Sirius exclusive rights to his entire back catalogue of radio shows from his time at terrestrial radio station WXRK, which spanned over twenty years from November 1985 to December 2005, totalling almost 23,000 hours. It was reported that Sirius agreed to pay CBS $2 million for the rights, approximately $87 per-hour of tape. Sirius held the rights to the tapes until the end of Stern's initial 5-year contract with the satellite company on December 31, 2010, when all rights returned to Stern. On December 2, 2009, it was announced that every tape had been digitized on a server taking up multiple terabytes of data. The process took close to five years to complete. This has allowed all specials broadcast on Howard 100 and Howard 101 to be produced.

== Personnel ==
Production ("The Tapes Team")

- David Heydt – executive producer
- Jeremy Lipkin – producer, writer
- Rich Gibbons – producer
- Paul Grassini – producer
- David LeClaire – segment producer
- Ben Barto – assistant producer
- Ryan Rasmason – assistant editor
- Adam Frederick - intern

The Howard Stern Show staff

- Howard Stern
- Robin Quivers
- Fred Norris
- Gary Dell'Abate
- Jackie Martling
- Artie Lange
- See more

Others

- Jim Forbes – narrator

== Episodes ==
=== Act I ===
No.	Title	Year(s) covered	Original release date
1	"The Early Years"	1954–1977	December 17, 2007
2	"Howard's Radio Journey Begins"	1977–1981	December 18, 2007
3	"Mr. Stern Goes to Washington"	1981–82	December 19, 2007
4	"Welcome to the Big Apple"	1982–84	December 20, 2007
5	"End of the WNBC Era"	1984–85	December 21, 2007

=== Act II ===
No.	Title	Year(s) covered	Original release date
6	"K-Rock: A New Beginning"	1985–86	December 22, 2008
7	"Morning Glory"	1986	December 23, 2008
8	"Philadelphia Freedom"	1986–87	December 24, 2008
9	"Video Thrilled the Radio Star"	1987	December 25, 2008
10	"Radio Wars"	1988	December 26, 2008
11	"New Faces, New Places"	1988	December 29, 2008
12	"Fight the Good Fight"	1989	December 30, 2008
13	"Unforced Errors"	1989	December 31, 2008
14	"The Radio King"	1990	January 1, 2009
15	"Television Triumph, Radio Tragedy"	1990	January 2, 2009

=== Act III ===
No.	Title	Year(s) covered	Original release date
16	"West Coast Story"	1991	December 21, 2009
17	"Hello Goodbye"	1992	December 22, 2009
18	"It's a Gas, Gas, Gas"	1992	December 23, 2009
19	"Bury 'Em"	1992–93	December 24, 2009
20	"Howard Stern's Private Parts"	1993	December 25, 2009
21	"A Political Party"	1993–94	December 28, 2009
22	"Radio D-Day"	1994	December 29, 2009
23	"The Kingmaker"	1994	December 30, 2009
24	"It's Not Fun"	1995	December 31, 2009
25	"Author, Author!"	1995–96	January 1, 2010

=== Act IV ===
No.	Title	Year(s) covered	Original release date
26	"A Star Is Born"	1996	December 20, 2010
27	"Cast of Characters"	1996	December 21, 2010
28	"King of All Media Blitz"	1997	December 22, 2010
29	"Private Parts The Movie"	1997	December 23, 2010
30	"Pushin' Limits"	1997–98	December 24, 2010
31	"Here's to The Losers"	1998	December 27, 2010
32	"My Personal Life Is At Like a 2"	1999	December 28, 2010
33	"Life's a Beach"	2000	December 29, 2010
34	"Should I Stay or Should I Go?"	2000–01	December 30, 2010
35	"In Memoriam"	2001	December 31, 2010

== Additional material ==
An episode covering 2004 and 2005 aired on July 17, 2015 which included the departure of John Melendez, the early period of JD Harmeyer, the show's run-ins with the FCC, the early days of Sal and Richard, and Stern's departure from terrestrial radio for Sirius. The episode was narrated by AJ Allen.
