= Jon Hein =

American broadcaster

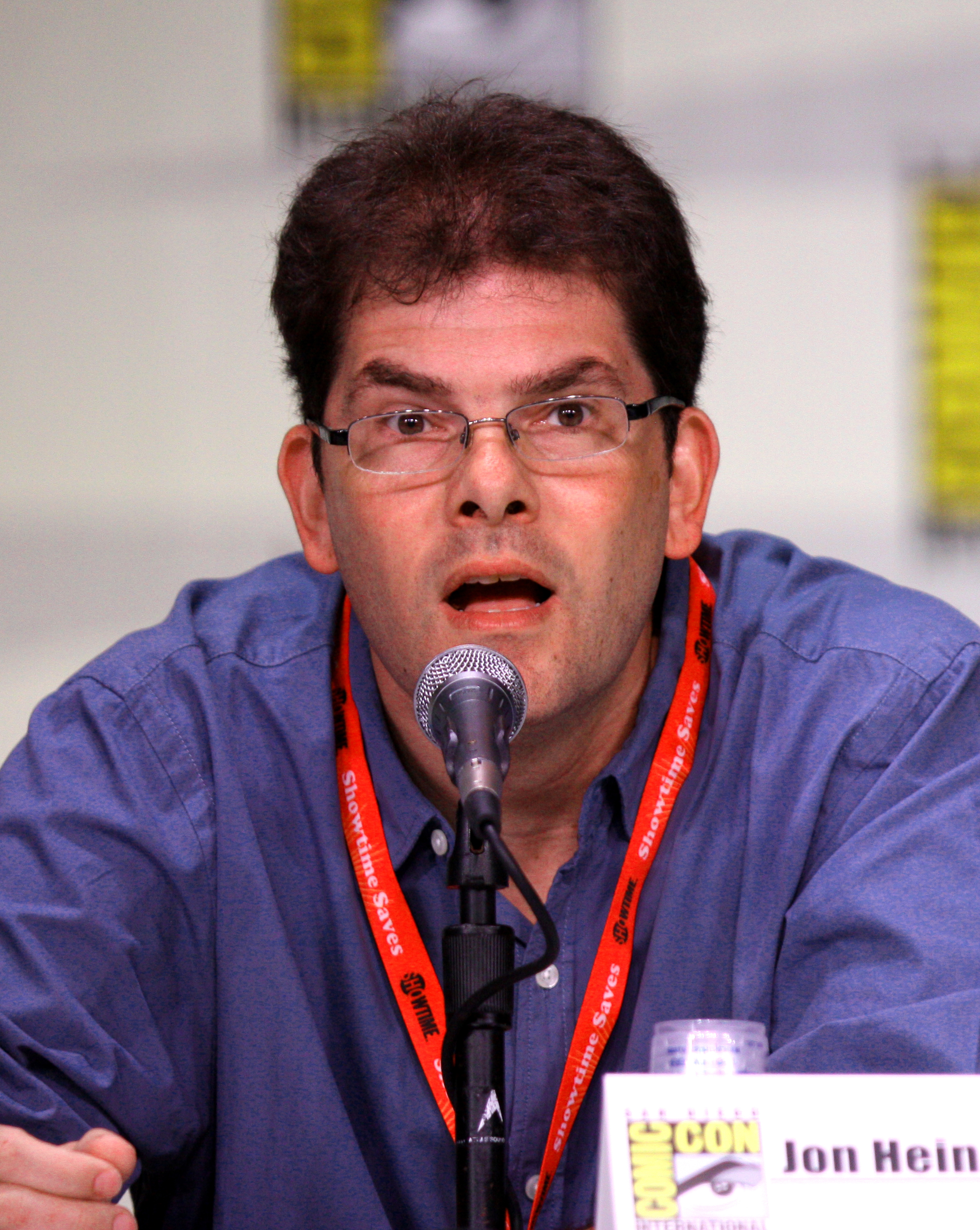
- Hein at San Diego Comic-Con in July 2011.
- Born: New York City, U.S.
- Education: University of Michigan
- Occupations: Radio personality; webmaster; author
- Years active: 2001–present
- Children: 2

Jon Hein is an American radio personality and former webmaster. He created the website jumptheshark.com and works for The Howard Stern Show. Hein has written three books, Jump the Shark: When Good Things Go Bad as well as Fast Food Maniac: From Arby’s to White Castle, One Man’s Supersized Obsession with America’s Favorite Food. Hein also wrote, Jump the Shark: TV Edition. He is an alumnus of the University of Michigan where he appeared in the sketch comedy troupe Comedy Company with Jon Glaser. The two also were a part of the comedy troupe Just Kidding along with Craig Neuman, Matt Schlein, Kristin Sobditch, Sara Mathison, H. Anthony Lehv.

== Jump the Shark origins ==
Hein created a website called JumpTheShark.com named after the idiom "jumping the shark". He and his University of Michigan roommate Sean Connolly coined the phrase in response to Season Five, Episode 3, "Hollywood: Part 3" of the sitcom Happy Days, in which Fonzie jumps over a shark while on water-skis.

The site allowed people to vote on whether a show had peaked ("Jumped the Shark") or not. Like TV Tropes it also began listing major tropes that indicated a show had jumped, such as recasting the role of a main character (like Darren Stephens on Bewitched), moving the show's locale (as when Laverne and Shirley moved the setting from working-class Milwaukee to Burbank), or adding a new castmember (like Cousin Oliver on The Brady Bunch or Scrappy Doo in the Scooby Doo franchise).

It also had a trope page solely dedicated to Ted McGinley, dubbed "Our Patron Saint". This was due to his coincidental presence on many shows that had done so. It especially referred to his role as Roger Philips on Happy Days itself to replace main character Ritchie Cunningham (played by Ron Howard). Its tone was actually reverential, never denigrating McGinley's acting talents, but culled fan survey quotations reprinted on the page showed their panic if he showed up in even a one-shot role on a program. There was also an "Honorable Mention" section for other actors the fans saw as equally foreboding, like comedic actress Alison La Placa, '70s and '80s TV mainstays Audrey and Judy Landers, comedy writer Jim Staahl, Happy Days alumnus Scott Baio, and intimidating character actor Michael Ironside.

Hein sold his company, Jump The Shark, Inc., to Gemstar (owners of TV Guide) on June 20, 2006 for "over $1 million". Some Stern staff have speculated that the site sold for closer to $5–$10 million, however. The TV Guide website has since redirected the original jumptheshark.com website. For some time, the website was replaced with a celebrity gossip message board.

== Sirius Satellite Radio ==
The Stern Show staff thought Hein was a good host on Super Fan Roundtable and chose him to be the host of The Wrap-Up Show with Stern producer Gary Dell'Abate as co-host. The show premiered on Stern's first day on Sirius, January 9, 2006, and has received very positive reviews from fans. Hein also hosted The Friday Show along with Gary Dell'Abate and Ralph Cirella on the Friday mornings when Stern took time off, although that show was replaced after a few months by Master Tape Theatre (Master Tape Theatre has since moved to Howard 101 on Sundays, replaced on Howard 100 by the Best of the Week, a montage show with clips from the Monday through Wednesday show).

Hein has become known as a fast food aficionado. He has vocalized his distaste for the fast food restaurant Burger King. Hein was subjected to a blindfolded taste test of burgers on Howard 101's The Fast Food Show, where he correctly identified a Burger King, McDonald's, and Wendy's burger patty. Hein admitted on the August 17, 2010 Howard Stern Show that he now weighed 255 lbs. but refused to give up fast food. According to Hein's book, Jon will not step out of a fast-food ordering line until his food is handed to him, advising others to do the same. Hein admitted on the January 17, 2008, Stern show that he adjusts his insulin levels to be able to indulge in junk food, such as his favorite Oreo cupcake from Crumbs cupcakes. Hein is also the host of the Friday radio program Geektime!, Jon Hein's TV Show on Thursdays, and the Fast Food Show all featured on Howard 101. Starting on March 2, 2010, Hein hosted the weekly comedy The Bonus Show with Rachel Fine on Howard TV. Howard TV shut down in December 2013.

Hein was promoted to Executive Producer of Howard 101 in 2022.

== Other projects ==
In 2012, Hein began to host his own television show, Fast Food Mania, on Destination America. In his show, Hein expresses his love of fast food by discussing the history of various restaurants, along with how their food is prepared.

Hein has written three books in his career. Jump the Shark: When Good Things Go Bad as well as Fast Food Maniac: From Arby’s to White Castle, One Man’s Supersized Obsession with American Fastfood. He also wrote, Jump the Shark: TV Edition.

Hein was a co-host on Loudmouths which aired weekdays at 5:30 PM ET on SNY (Sportsnet New York). The show was canceled on May 21, 2020.

== Personal life ==
Hein is married, has two daughters, and lives on Long Island, New York.

== In popular culture ==
Similar to Howard Stern's producer Gary Dell'Abate, Hein has several media mentions in pop culture with the phrase "Hit em with the Hein". The phrase was coined by production staff in the back office to mock Hein based on his perceived low-energy level as Hein would leave the office to attend to business unrelated to The Howard Stern Show. The phrase was then popularized by Jason Kaplan, an often on-air staff member. It has been used on many PGA Tour events, in some cases to the dismay of the announcers.

This phrase has also been referenced by Jimmy Kimmel during the 2016 Emmy Award show.

Based on Hein's statements on The Howard Stern Show, he either enjoys the phrase or is annoyed by it, largely based on perceived intent.

Singer Rick Astley produced a song dedicated to the "Hit em with the Hein" concept on SoundCloud.

Connecticut-based musician Jamey Jasta, frontman of the metalcore band Hatebreed, released a song inspired by the phrase on his SoundCloud. "Hit 'em with the Hein" is also used in later versions of Sony's MLB: The Show franchise by announcer Matt Vasgersian during gameplay.

== See also ==
- The Howard Stern Show staff
