= Dave VanDam =

American voice impressionist (1955–2018)

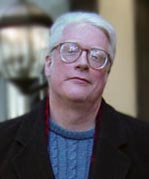
- Born: David J. VanDam; April 17, 1955; Chicago, Illinois, U.S.
- Died: July 3, 2018 (aged 63); Skokie, Illinois, U.S.
- Other names: Evil Dave, Evil Dave Letterman
- Occupations: Voice actor, impressionist
- Known for: The Howard Stern Show; Celebrity Deathmatch; Family Guy; American Dad

David J. VanDam (April 17, 1955 – July 3, 2018), well known as "Evil Dave Letterman" or simply "Evil Dave", was an American voice impressionist who began appearing on The Howard Stern Show in 1999 until his death. Although VanDam's natural speaking voice did not sound exactly like American late night talk show host David Letterman, he was able to alter it so that it sounded identical, which was used for comedic effect.

== The Howard Stern Show ==
VanDam's first appearance on The Howard Stern Show occurred on December 8, 1999. Using his "Letterman voice", he called in making jokes about Jay Leno, Letterman's rival late-night talk show host. The next day, Stern read an article from the New York Daily News explaining that an advisor of the real Letterman had to announce that the caller was actually not the real Letterman. VanDam was later called back to be congratulated, and Stern expressed his interest in the impression and the reaction it received. Stern then told VanDam that he would contact him to make more appearances, as well as writing "filthy" lines that the real Letterman would not say.

VanDam would continue calling in the show throughout 2000 until he made his first live studio appearance on July 27, 2001, when he took part in The Gossip Game with Mike Walker, a weekly show segment, under the identity of "David E. Letterman." The visit was a success, and VanDam would make three to five studio visits a year from 2001 to 2005, until Stern left terrestrial radio.

Following the show's move to Sirius XM Radio in January 2006, VanDam's first appearance on Howard 100 occurred during an episode of Tissue Time with Heidi Cortez, before the show's inaugural broadcast. VanDam's first call was on January 13, 2006, which was planned as a series of pranks on the new show announcer George Takei. VanDam called in as Letterman to dupe Takei into reading a Top 10 list about William Shatner on the day's Late Show with David Letterman.

=== Show segments ===
VanDam recorded prank calls and other clips which were taped and assembled by show staffers Sal Governale, Richard Christy and Benjy Bronk. He was usually given various lines or words to pronounce, which were used in a recurring game for the show, where someone would bet whether VanDam could pronounce words such as "rhapsody" "psychology" or celebrity names, such as Renée Zellweger.

== Other works ==
VanDam starred in the Family Guy episode "Back to the Woods" on February 17, 2008, as the real Letterman. He appeared in MTV's Celebrity Deathmatch episode "The Mystery of Loch Ness Monster," as Letterman.

He also appeared on the Internet and cable television program Psycho Babble.

VanDam voiced Barack Obama on American Dad! in the episode "An Incident at Owl Creek."

== Death ==
VanDam died in Skokie, Illinois, on July 3, 2018.
