= The Wrap-Up Show =

The Howard Stern Wrap-Up Show
- Genre: Talk show, Entertainment
- Running time: ~1 hour
- Country of origin: United States
- Language(s): English
- Home station: Howard 101
- Starring: Gary Dell'Abate; Jon Hein
- Original release: January 9, 2006 – Present
- Opening theme: "Remedy" by The Black Crowes
- Ending theme: "Remedy" or "Fuckin' in the Bushes" by Oasis
- Website: www.siriusxm.com/howard100

The Howard Stern Wrap-Up Show (commonly just called The Wrap-Up Show) is a radio show that follows The Howard Stern Show on Howard 101, an uncensored channel on Sirius XM Radio. Originally hosted by Jon Hein until September 2022, it was hosted for a time by Rahsaan Rogers and Executive Producer Gary Dell'Abate. The show discusses everything that happened on that day's Howard Stern Show. Calls from listeners are taken and celebrity guests occasionally sit in. It used to have other Howard Stern employees from their back office sit in on a consistent basis, but the platform has since changed.

In 2024, the hosts were Gary Dell'Abate and Jon Hein.

The Wrap-Up Show begins on SiriusXM channel Howard 101 at 11am ET.

The show used to air live on SiriusXM Channel 100 following The Howard Stern Show but has since changed to being exclusively on Howard 101.

Prior to 2015, The Howard Stern Wrap-Up Show was open for all show staff members to discuss topics along with Hein and Dell'Abate; however, the show now only features the hosts and a revolving panel of guests discussing The Howard Stern Show and each guest's respective promotions.

Howard Stern does not participate on the Wrap Up Show. However, there is the extremely rare exception where Howard will call in from outside of the studio. This has not happened many times as Howard typically will address noteworthy moments from the Wrap Up Show on his live Howard Stern Show broadcast.

Starting September 2022, The Wrap-Up Show lineup changed from featuring Jon Hein, Gary Dell'Abate and Rahsaan to featuring Rahsaan and Gary Dell'Abate. While it is not officially known why Jon Hein is no longer hosting the show, it is speculated that the change is due to Jon Hein accepting a new position at SiriusXM as the Executive Producer of Howard 101.

Starting September 2024, The Wrap-Up Show lineup changed from featuring Gary Dell'Abate and Rahsaan to featuring Gary Dell'Abate and John Hein.

== See also ==
- Howard Stern
- The Howard Stern Show
- Sirius XM Radio
- Howard 100
