= They Call Me Baba Booey =

Autobiography by radio producer Gary Dell'Abate

- Author: Gary Dell'Abate; Chad Millman
- Language: English
- Subject: Personal memoirs
- Publisher: Villard
- Publication date: November 2, 2010
- Publication place: United States
- Media type: Hardcover, eBook, unabridged audiobook download
- Pages: 256 pp (first edition hardcover)
- ISBN: 978-1-4000-6955-2

They Call Me Baba Booey is an autobiography by radio producer Gary Dell'Abate with Chad Millman. In December 2010, InfoMania interviewed Dell'Abate about the book. Published by Villard, an imprint of Random House, the book was released on November 2, 2010.

== Release ==
On April 28, 2010, the day of the book's announcement, about 20,000 words had been compiled. Dell'Abate reportedly signed a six-figure deal with Random House for his memoirs. In early 2019, Howard Stern and his staff determined that the book's lists still hold up.
