= Scott Ferrall =

American sports talk radio personality (born 1965)

- Born: July 29, 1965 (age 61); Mt. Lebanon, Pennsylvania, U.S.
- Occupations: Radio personality, sports commentator
- Years active: 1983–present
- Presenting career
- Show: Scott Ferrall: Coast to Coast
- Station: SportsGrid
- Show: In-Game Live
- Station: SportsGrid
- Previous shows: The Sports Guys, Sports in the Morning with Ferrall, Howard 101 “ Ferrall on the Bench CBS Sports Radio

Scott Ferrall (born July 29, 1965) is an American sports talk radio personality who hosts two shows on the SportsGrid video streaming service, Scott Ferrall: Coast to Coast and In-Game Live.

Ferrall's voice has been described as extremely raspy or gravelly. He describes himself as "gnarly, irritating, annoying, old leather".

== Radio history ==
=== Early career ===
Ferrall attended Mount Lebanon High School and went to Indiana University.

His career began as a standard sports news reader on all-news KQV radio in his home town of Pittsburgh. When he left KQV, he drifted to Florida and found part-time radio work in the Tampa area. After a short stint with the Sports Entertainment Network (now SB Nation Radio), he became a sports host on Infinity Broadcasting sports talker WFAN in New York City, and numerous other stations, including KLSX in Los Angeles, KNBR in San Francisco and WCNN in Atlanta.

Ferrall got a break on WNEW-FM by befriending Opie and Anthony and ended up taking over The Sports Guys talk show on WNEW-FM mornings where it became Sports in the Morning with Ferrall. He was then fired from WNEW for supporting Opie and Anthony when they were pulled from the airwaves for their "Sex for Sam 3" bit. Following WNEW, Ferrall went to Miami and did mornings on Beasley Broadcasting sports station WQAM (home of Neil Rogers), where his show got the station fined $55,000 by the Federal Communications Commission (FCC).

Following his exit at WQAM, Ferrall took the midday slot at the newly created Real Radio WMAX-FM (now WRDG) 105.3 Atlanta in January 2004. His stint at "Atlanta's only FM talk station" only lasted until September 2004 when the station flipped to a Latin format.

=== 2006–2012: Howard 101 ===
For a time before moving to Sirius, Ferrall did radio shows on weekends for Fox Sports Radio. On February 9, 2006, Howard Stern announced that Ferrall had joined Howard 101 on Sirius. Stern said that he originally hired Ferrall because he felt he was a great radio talent that had been treated poorly by the industry. Scott's joining Howard 101 led to a feud with former friends Opie and Anthony, after Ferrall badmouthed them on his website. This bad blood resulted in Opie and Anthony's fans, 'The Pests' successfully hijacking Scott's radio show with prank calls for nearly two weeks. Ferrall's show aired weekdays from 8:00 pm to midnight Eastern. On October 1, 2012, Ferrall announced that he would be starting on the CBS Sports Radio Network on January 2, 2013. The next day, Stern played some "best-of" clips of Ferrall and said he "would be missed" and was a "great guy".

=== 2013–2020: Ferrall on the Bench ===
Ferrall was featured in the 10p.m.-2a.m. weekday slot at CBS Sports Radio since the network went to full 24/7 broadcasting in 2013. His radio program Ferrall on the Bench, featured his entertaining style combining the sports news of the day with his outspoken opinions. His last broadcast at CBS was January 7, 2020.

=== 2020-Present: SportsGrid ===
A few days after leaving CBS Sports Radio, Ferrall announced he was joining SportsGrid, a sports betting video streaming service, to do two weekday shows, beginning January 29, 2020. Scott Ferrall: Coast to Coast (4-6pm ET) features live pre-game wagering odds, moneylines and statistics - along with Ferrall's betting strategies. In-Game Live (7-9pm) features in-game betting action. Ferrall's programs are also simulcast on SportsMap Radio Network.
