= Tortured Man =

Single by Howard Stern and The Dust Brothers

from the album Private Parts Soundtrack
- Released: 1997
- Recorded: 1997
- Label: Warner Bros.
- Songwriters: Michael Simpson, John King, Jackie Martling, Eric Fred Norris, Howard Stern

"Tortured Man" is a 1997 song by Howard Stern with The Dust Brothers that originally featured on the soundtrack for Stern's 1997 film Private Parts. The song has been used as the closing theme song for The Howard Stern Show since January 1999. The song features Marc Hutner and Josh Blum from the rock group Sugartooth on guitar and bass.

The song's lyrics, written with help from Stern Show writers Jackie Martling and Fred Norris, detail the frustration Stern felt for years as a married man with many beautiful women as guests on his radio show. This mirrors one of the central themes of Private Parts - Stern's devotion to his wife and family. When Stern and his first wife, Alison, separated in 2000 and divorced in 2001 it gave Stern the opportunity to date glamorous celebrities such as Angie Everhart and Robin Givens before settling down and marrying model Beth Ostrosky in 2008.

The song also features a number of regularly used sounds clips from the radio show featuring Martling, show producer Gary Dell'Abate, and Stern's parents Ben and Ray.
