= Robin Quivers =

American radio presenter

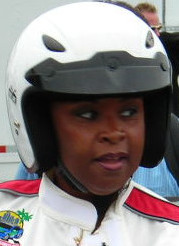
- Quivers in 2007
- Born: Robin Ophelia Quivers; August 8, 1952 (age 74); Baltimore, Maryland, U.S.
- Education: University of Maryland, Baltimore
- Occupations: Radio personality, author, actress
- Years active: since 1979
- Military career
- Allegiance: United States
- Branch: United States Air Force
- Service years: 1975–1978
- Rank: Captain

Robin Ophelia Quivers (born August 8, 1952) is an American radio personality and long-running co-host of The Howard Stern Show.

== Early life ==
Quivers, who is of African American heritage, was born on August 8, 1952, in Baltimore, Maryland. Her parents were educated only to the seventh grade. In her 1995 autobiography, Quivers revealed that she was molested by her father at a young age. At seventeen, Quivers enrolled in a pre-nursing program at Maryland General Hospital. She graduated from Western High School in 1970 and then began study at the University of Maryland, Baltimore.

== Career ==
=== Military ===
In 1974, Quivers graduated from the University of Maryland, Baltimore. Her first position was at the Maryland Shock Trauma facility of the Maryland Institute for Emergency Medical Services System, where she described her role as that of "a shock-trauma, intensive care kind of nurse, so I saw unpleasantness all the time". Knowing she could use her degree, Quivers joined the United States Air Force in July 1975, where she was commissioned as a second lieutenant. She entered active duty at Sheppard Air Force Base in Texas on January 11, 1976. After six months of service, Quivers was promoted to first lieutenant. By June 1978, she had acquired the rank of captain.

=== Radio ===
In 1979, Quivers returned to Baltimore, where she studied at the Broadcasting Institute of Maryland and worked in a hospital. She landed her first job in the radio industry with a newscasting position at WIOO in Carlisle, Pennsylvania, followed by WCMB in nearby Harrisburg. She then moved back to Baltimore for a consumer reporter role at WFBR, where she also read newscasts with morning disc jockey Johnny Walker.

In March 1981, radio personality Howard Stern started his new morning program at WWDC (FM) in Washington, DC. He wanted an on-air newscaster to riff with him in the studio on the news and current affairs. Station program director Denise Oliver played Quivers a tape of Stern interviewing a prostitute on the air and she accepted the job without meeting him. She assumed she "would come in and do the news ... but it wasn't that way".

Quivers was absent from The Howard Stern Show studio from May 21, 2012 until October 2, 2013, to undergo treatment for stage III endometrial cancer.

== Awards ==
At the 45th NAACP Image Awards in February 2014, Quivers won for Outstanding Literary Work – Instructional, for her book The Vegucation of Robin: How Real Food Saved My Life.

Quivers was inducted into the National Radio Hall of Fame in 2017.

== Personal life ==
Quivers resides in New Jersey. From the mid-1990s until April 2007, her long-time boyfriend Tony was mysteriously referred to on the radio show as "Mr. X". On April 23, 2007, while calling in to the Bubba the Love Sponge Show on Howard 101 to wish the host a happy birthday, Quivers was asked about her relationship with Mr. X, and responded with an announcement that they had separated.

In 1990, she underwent breast reduction surgery. In June 2007, Quivers began a vegan diet, which she says helped to increase her energy and helped her to lose 60 pounds (27 kilograms) over a six-month period. Quivers was set to release a book about her experiences as a vegan in March 2013, but it was pushed back to October.

In August 2007, comedian Jim Florentine asked Quivers on the air to go on a date with him. Due to the attention this garnered, Quivers became tight-lipped about the topic. On July 28, 2008, Quivers announced on The Howard Stern Show she and Florentine had ended their relationship. She stated that the breakup was amicable, that Florentine was "genuine and honest", and that he was the one who initiated the breakup.

Quivers has had many different hobbies, including race car driving, painting, rock climbing and other physical activities. She claimed she would be a successful racer and challenged radio personality Bubba the Love Sponge, an experienced driver, to a future race. Quivers competed in the 2007 Toyota Pro/Celebrity Race, finishing in fourteenth place out of seventeen racers.

To promote his book The Mirror Effect, Drew Pinsky administered a test designed to measure narcissism of many celebrities, including the staff of The Howard Stern Show. At 34 out of 40, Quivers scored the highest of all celebrities polled; the average for Americans is 15.3. Quivers's voice is often joked about on the Howard Stern show as being condescending and "snooty."

Quivers works with The Girl Fund, a program organized by the United Nations that advocates for education of girls in countries where they are often exploited. Quivers also founded the 15 Foundation, a nonprofit organization.

Quivers has learned the Transcendental Meditation technique, as taught by Maharishi Mahesh Yogi.

=== Health ===
Quivers announced in May 2012 that she needed to have surgery to remove a tumor from her bladder. Shortly afterward, she continued to provide commentary for the show from her home via an ISDN line, though this was hidden from listeners. Stern stated that Quivers was such an instrumental part of the show that he would quit radio if he ever lost her as a partner.

On September 9, 2013, Quivers announced that her cancer was in complete remission after successful surgery, radiation, and chemotherapy. After seventeen months, Quivers returned to the studio on October 2, 2013. Quivers' official diagnosis was stage 3C endometrial cancer. In 2016, the cancer returned. In mid-2024, she noted that she was still "in and out of treatment". In June 2026, Quivers announced that she was cancer free.

== Books ==
- Quivers, Robin (April 1, 1995). Quivers: A Life (1st ed.). HarperCollins. ISBN 0-06-039153-7.
- Quivers, Robin (March 26, 2012). The Vegucation of Robin: How Real Food Saved My Life (1st ed.). Avery: Penguin Group (USA). ISBN 978-1-58333-473-7.

== See also ==
- Gary Dell'Abate
- Jackie Martling
- Fred Norris

== Sources ==
- Colford, Paul (1997). Howard Stern: King of All Media (2nd ed.). St. Martin's Press. ISBN 978-0-312-96221-0.
- Quivers, Robin (1995). Quivers: A Life (1st ed.). HarperCollins. ISBN 978-0-06-039153-9.
- Stern, Howard (1993). Private Parts (1st ed.). Simon & Schuster. ISBN 978-0-671-88016-3. OCLC 28968496.
