= Mitch Fatel =

American comedian (born 1968)

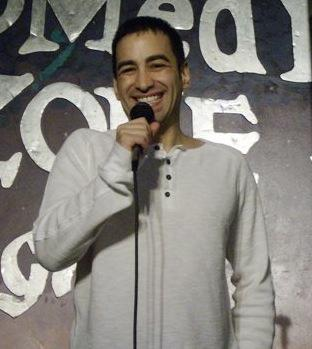
- Mitch Fatel at the ComedyZone
- Born: December 20, 1968 (age 57)

Comedy career
- Years active: 1993–present
- Medium: Stand up comedy, television
- Genre: Stand-up comedy
- Subject: observational comedy

Mitch Fatel (born December 20, 1968), also known as Mitch Faytel, is a stand-up comedian. Born in Manhattan, he was raised in Yonkers, New York, and began doing stand-up at the age of 15. In 1988, Fatel attended NYU/Tisch School of the Arts and majored in film and acting studies. Fatel was a former intern on The Howard Stern Show.
