= The Howard Stern Show =

American radio show

- Genre: Talk show, entertainment
- Running time: 3 hours (approx.), Monday
- Country of origin: United States
- Language: English
- Home station: WWDC (1981–1982); WNBC (1982–1985); WXRK (1985–2005); Howard 100 (2006–present); Howard 101 (2006–2026)
- TV adaptations: See Howard Stern television shows
- Hosted by: Howard Stern; Robin Quivers
- Starring: See List of The Howard Stern Show staff
- Created by: Howard Stern
- Executive producer: Gary Dell'Abate
- Original release: 1970s – present
- Opening theme: "The Great American Nightmare" by Rob Zombie and Stern
- Ending theme: "Tortured Man" by Stern and the Dust Brothers
- Website: howardstern.com siriusxm.com/talk/howard-stern

The Howard Stern Show is an American radio show hosted by Howard Stern that gained wide recognition when it was nationally syndicated on terrestrial radio from WXRK in New York City, between 1986 and 2005. The show has aired on Howard 100 and Howard 101, Stern's two uncensored channels on the subscription-based satellite radio service SiriusXM, since 2006. Other prominent staff members include co-host and news anchor Robin Quivers, writer Fred Norris and executive producer Gary Dell'Abate, along with former members Jackie Martling, Billy West, John Melendez, and Artie Lange.

Stern began his radio career in the mid-1970s and developed his show through morning positions at WRNW in Briarcliff Manor, New York, WCCC-FM in Hartford, Connecticut, and WWWW in Detroit. In 1981, he began at WWDC-FM in Washington, D.C., where he was first paired with Quivers and became a ratings success. That was followed by three years at WNBC in New York City. After his abrupt firing, Stern moved to WXRK where he remained for 20 years until December 2005. During this time, The Howard Stern Show was syndicated to 60 radio markets and gained an audience of 20 million listeners at its peak. In the New York area, it was the highest-rated morning radio program from 1994 to 2001. The show is also the most fined in radio history, with a total of $2.5 million in fines issued by the Federal Communications Commission for indecent material. In 2004, Stern signed the first of several five-year contracts with Sirius; the first was reportedly worth $500 million.

In addition to radio broadcasting, The Howard Stern Show has been filmed since 1994 and broadcast on various networks, including the E! and CBS television channels. It moved to HowardTV, Stern's own on-demand digital cable channel from 2005 to 2013.

In the SiriusXM era, the program has increasingly emphasized long-form interviews, with official SiriusXM materials promoting the show's celebrity interviews, staff-driven segments, and archive programming across Howard 100 and Howard 101. Notable later broadcasts have included Stern's 2022 in-studio interview with Bruce Springsteen, his April 2024 interview with President Joe Biden, and his October 2024 interview with Vice President Kamala Harris.

== Format and channels ==
Since moving to Sirius in 2006, the program has been centered on two dedicated channels: Howard 100, which SiriusXM describes as the exclusive home of The Howard Stern Show, and Howard 101, which carries The Wrap-Up Show, Sternthology archive programming, celebrity specials, concert performances, and other related material. SiriusXM's channel descriptions emphasize that Howard 100 features Stern's in-depth celebrity interviews, commentary on current events, behind-the-scenes staff segments, and phony phone calls, while Howard 101 functions as a companion channel built around archival content and post-show discussion. Beginning September 1, 2026, the two channels' programming consolidated onto Howard 100 as part of a broader realignment of the SiriusXM lineup.

== History ==
=== 1975–1981: Early development ===
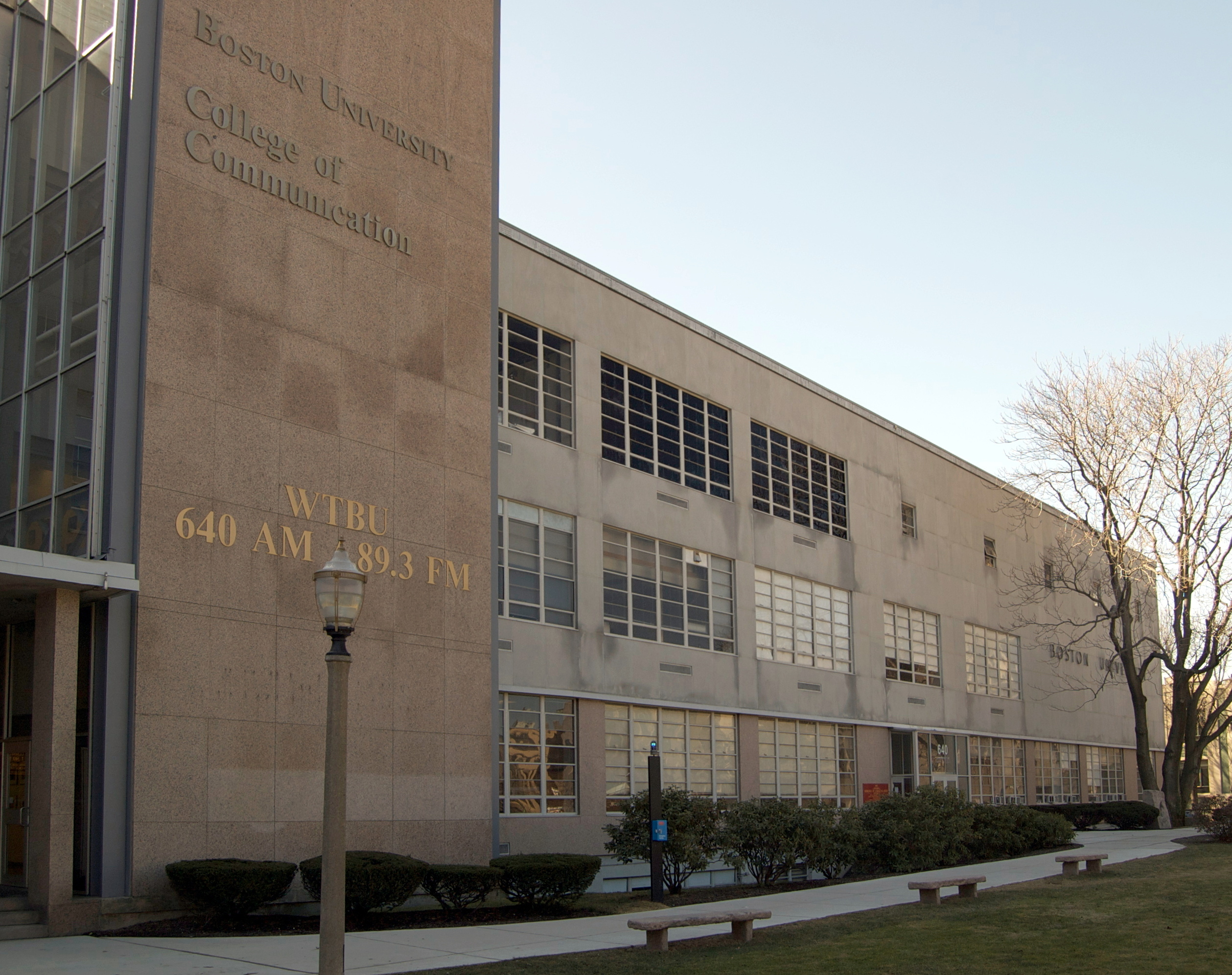
While at Boston University, Stern worked at WTBU and worked his first professional radio job in 1975.

Stern landed his first professional radio job while at Boston University, performing on-air skits, news casting and production duties at 1550 WNTN in Newton, Massachusetts, from August to December 1975. He also hosted a show with three fellow students on WTBU, the campus radio station; the show was named The King Schmaltz Bagel Hour, which was cancelled during its first broadcast for a sketch called "Godzilla Goes to Harlem". After his graduation, Stern landed some cover shifts in December 1976 at WRNW, a progressive rock station in Briarcliff Manor, New York, where he was subsequently hired full-time as the midday host. He produced more creative commercials by calling business owners live on the air, which he wrote "was mind-blowing to everyone there."

In 1979, Stern responded to an advertisement for a "wild, fun morning guy" at WCCC-FM, an album oriented rock (AOR) station in Hartford, Connecticut. He produced a more outrageous audition tape, playing Robert Klein and Cheech and Chong records mixed with flatulence routines and one-liners. He was hired for the job, his first in a large radio market. As the station's public affairs director, Stern also hosted a half-hour interview show on Sunday mornings, which he enjoyed as it contained no music. He would ask unusual questions to his guests, such as their dating habits. Stern held a two-day boycott of Shell Oil Company during the summer of the 1979 energy crisis, which put Stern and the station into the national news. Stern also began his "Dial-a-Date" routines at WCCC, and met Fred Norris, the station's overnight disc jockey who provided Stern's show with various comedic impressions of celebrities. Norris would join the show as Stern's writer and producer in 1981.

Stern left WCCC after being denied a raise in salary. He began a new morning shift at WWWW, a struggling rock outlet in Detroit, Michigan, on April 21, 1980. He learned to become more open on the air and "decided to cut down the barriers ... strip down all the ego ... and be totally honest ... I still sounded like an FM announcer". Stern held a bra-burning event and wrestled women outside the studios, and invited listeners to confess the most outrageous places where they had sex, and record their calls for the air. A stunt in which listeners paid $1.06 (the station's FM frequency) to hit a Japanese car with a sledgehammer earned Stern national mention. For his performance, Stern won a Billboard award for "Best Album-Oriented Rock Disc Jockey" and was featured in the Drake-Chenault "Top Five Talent Search" contest in the AOR category. Published in January 1981, the fall Arbitron ratings showed that Stern trailed his three rock competitors with a 1.6% market share of the listening audience during an average quarter-hour. It was the final straw for management, which turned WWWW into a country music format on January 18, 1981. Stern made a brief, half-hearted attempt to be a country radio DJ but realized it wasn't to his liking. Stern left the station soon after and declined offers to work at CHUM-FM in Toronto, WXRT in Chicago and WPLJ in New York City.

=== 1981–1985: Washington and WNBC ===
On March 2, 1981, Stern began his third morning job, this time at WWDC-FM, a rock station in Washington, D.C. He was determined to become a success, and noticed the importance of news segments for satire. He requested a news person to riff with him in the studio and not just deliver news briefs, returning to the newsroom when they were finished. Robin Quivers, a news anchor and consumer reporter from WFBR in Baltimore was eventually chosen. She agreed to meet Stern after hearing him interview a sex worker on the air. Quivers at first "thought I would come in and do the news ... but it wasn't that way ... he wanted someone to play off of ... he wanted a real live person there with him". The show began to break format, and Stern held a lesbian edition of "Dial-a-Date" in May 1981. He formed the Think Tank, a cohesive trio of male listeners who conversed with Stern and played along with quizzes and routines, which helped the show sound more natural. By January 1982, Stern had the second highest-rated morning program in the city. On January 14, one day after the crash of Air Florida Flight 90, Stern made listeners believe he asked Air Florida the price of a one-way ticket to the 14th Street Bridge, the location of the disaster. "Is that going to be a permanent stop?" asked Stern. On June 29, 1982, Stern's contract at WWDC was terminated. Later, he wrote that the Air Florida segment was not the reason for his departure, nor did anyone complain about it. He had signed a contract with WNBC in March, and began to berate management and other DJs on the air. Quivers, who left the show early on June 17, worked at WCBM in Baltimore until rejoining Stern on October 18, 1982. Stern presented a farewell show on August 8, 1982, on competing station WAVA-FM. He had more than tripled the station's ratings during his stay.

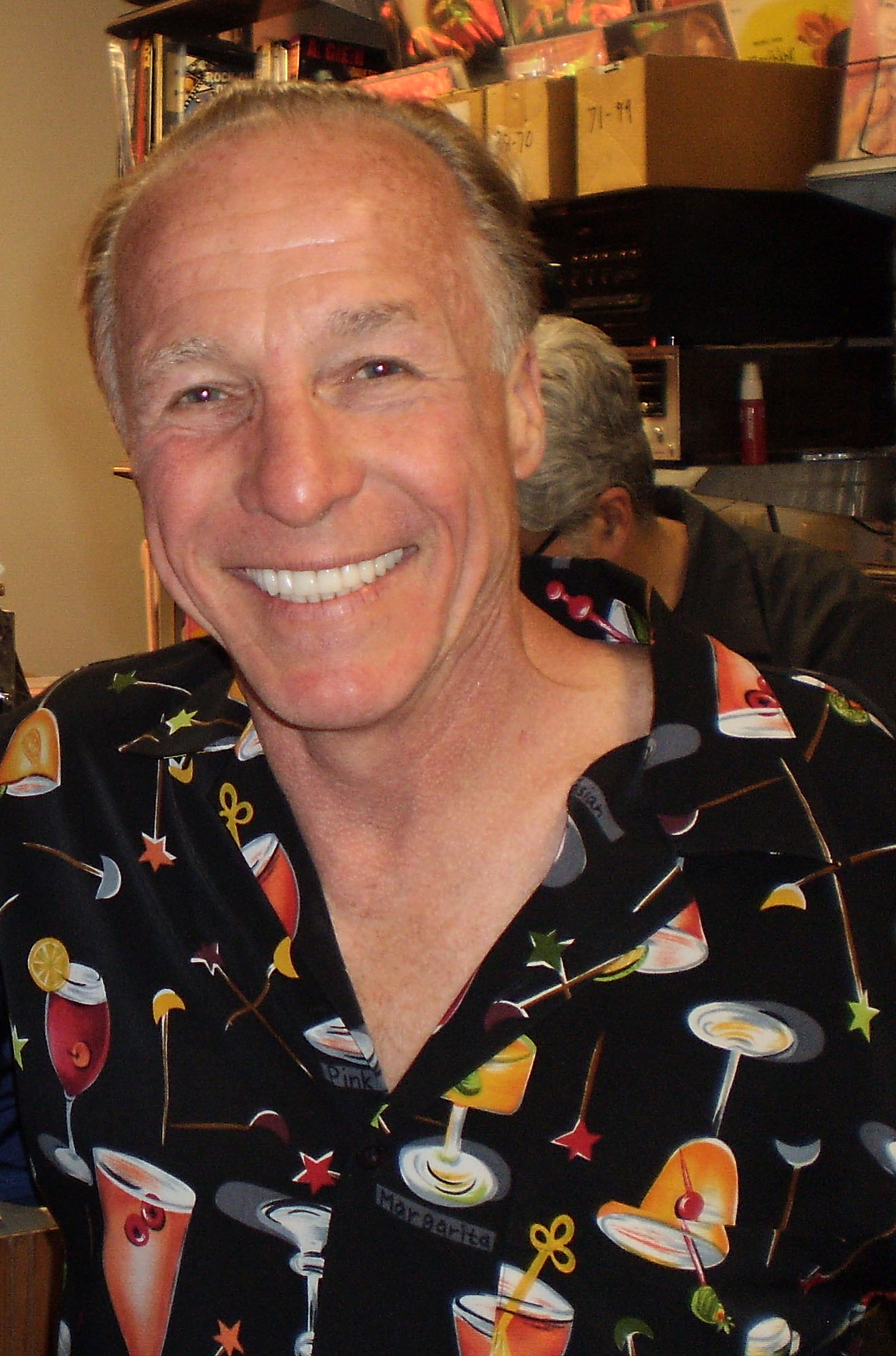
Jackie "The Joke Man" Martling served as the show's head writer from 1983 to 2001.

Stern began his WNBC program in September 1982, working from 4–8 p.m. Concerned about its corporate image and his risque personality, management told Stern to avoid discussions of a sexual and religious nature. Within his first month at the station, Stern was suspended for several days for a controversial segment known as "Virgin Mary Kong". The skit featured a new video game by God in which a group of men chase the Virgin Mary around a singles bar in Jerusalem. In February 1983, comedian Jackie Martling was hired to make weekly appearances as a comedy writer. With his on-the-fly style, he provided jokes for such show bits as "Stump the Jokeman" and "The Match Game". Martling assumed the role full-time in August 1986 when he replaced Al Rosenberg, a comedian and writer at WNBC who could no longer commute from Washington, D.C. Also hired was Gary Dell'Abate of the station's traffic department, who started as the show's assistant in September 1984 and went on to become executive producer. Stern continued to break out of the station's strict format. He had a naked woman on the show for the first time and attempted to make another reach orgasm through her radio speaker, both of which were reenacted in his film Private Parts (1997).

The Arbitron ratings released in 1984 showed an increase in listeners to Stern's show. Having moved shifts to 3–7 p.m., he attracted audience shares of 3.8%, 4.2%, and 4.6% that year. The show was popular among males aged between 18 and 34, a highly marketable demographic for advertisers. Stern acquired a 5.7% share in 1985, the highest rating at the station in four years, pushing the station's ranking in afternoons from eleventh to first place in three years. Amid the success, tension between management and Stern grew further. On September 30, 1985, the show was cancelled due to what management termed "conceptual differences" between themselves and Stern regarding his show. "Over the course of time, we made a very conscious effort to make Stern aware that certain elements of the program should be changed", said program director John Hayes, whom Stern had nicknamed "The Incubus". "I don't think it's appropriate to say what those specifics were." In 1992, Stern believed that Thornton Bradshaw, at the time chairman of RCA which then owned WNBC, was driving in his limousine having heard his "Bestiality Dial-a-Date" segment and ordered his firing. Later, NBC chairman Grant Tinker admitted that it was his decision, after corporate communications director Bob Rukeyser alerted him about the risqué material on Stern's show.

=== 1985–1994: WXRK and start of syndication ===
Stern returned to the New York airwaves on rock station WXRK, where he began his 20-year residency at the station in afternoons from 2–6 on November 18, 1985. Following his move to mornings from 6 am on February 18, 1986, Stern entered national syndication on August 18, 1986, when WYSP in Philadelphia first simulcast the program. In the 18-plus male demographic, WYSP rose from eleventh to second place in three months. Stern began a rivalry with the number one host John DeBella of WMMR, and was determined to beat him in the ratings. He achieved his goal in April 1990, and held a celebratory "funeral" for DeBella on May 10 in Rittenhouse Square which aired live. By early 1987, Stern had almost completely stopped playing music during the show and was reaching almost 800,000 listeners each week in the New York area. Between September 1986 and February 1987, Stern hosted a three-hour Saturday morning program with a live audience which was syndicated to 45 markets across the country by DIR Broadcasting. The show added two new staff in 1988—impressionist Billy West and intern "Stuttering John" Melendez, who would achieve notoriety by asking celebrities awkward questions on the red carpet and press conferences. That year, Stern returned to the Washington, D.C., market after a six-year absence when he was syndicated on WJFK, his third affiliate.

In July 1991, the show began to air on KLSX in Los Angeles. Listeners jammed the station's switchboard during the first simulcast with mostly negative calls about the change. Stern rivaled with the KLOS morning team of Mark and Brian, who for three years had the area's top-rated program. In January 1992, Stern reached the number one spot in New York by overtaking the news station WINS, who had enjoyed a ten-year reign. He was reaching over one million listeners a week there, and hosted a live victory parade in Times Square to celebrate. In October 1992, Stern became the first person to have the number one show in New York and Los Angeles simultaneously, as he acquired a 9.5% market share in New York and 6.4% in Los Angeles. His victory funeral for Mark and Brian was held in the parking lot of the Los Angeles Palace Theatre in November 1992. By this time, advertisers were charged as much as $3,000 in New York, and $1,500 in Los Angeles, for a one-minute commercial on the show. In January 1993, Stern overtook Philadelphia news station KYW-AM in the morning ratings, which ended the station's 14-year run at number one. Following his 1992 debut on WNCX in Cleveland, Stern took the station from thirteenth in mornings to first place in under two years. On June 10, 1994, during the city's funeral broadcast William Alford, an engineer of competing station WMMS, cut a wire used for the show's satellite feed which stopped the broadcast temporarily. Alford was later sentenced to ten days in jail and a $1,000 fine.

In June 1994, robotic cameras were installed in the WXRK studio to film the radio show for a condensed half-hour program on E!. Howard Stern ran for 11 years until the last original episode aired on July 8, 2005. In conjunction with his move to satellite radio, Stern launched Howard Stern on Demand, a subscription-based video-on-demand service, on November 18, 2005. The service was relaunched as Howard TV on March 16, 2006.

On December 7, 1994, Stern made national news when he prevented a man from committing suicide by jumping off the George Washington Bridge. The man, Emilio Bonilla, had called into the radio show from the bridge. He was kept on the line for five minutes until Port Authority Police, whose tour commander was listening to the show, took Bonilla into custody. Bonilla, who was charged with cocaine possession and reckless endangerment, was taken to the hospital. Senator Al D'Amato and Ed Koch, former mayor of New York City, called in to congratulate Stern.

=== 1995–1999: Selena, Canada, and Columbine controversies ===
On April 3, 1995, three days after the shooting of singer Selena which happened to be the same day she would be laid to rest in Corpus Christi, Texas a rift in the Hispanic community occurred after Stern commented on her music and Spanish people. After a song of hers was played with gunshot sound effects, Stern said "Spanish people have the worst taste in music. They have no depth. Alvin and the Chipmunks have more soul." He called one of her records "awful music that could only be popular with that segment of society." Callers to KEGL in Dallas, Texas, jammed the station's switchboards. The League of United Latin American Citizens attempted to get Stern off the air, while listeners called for boycotts against his advertisers. Stern responded to the reaction with a statement in Spanish, arguing that his comments were not intended to cause pain to her family, friends and loved ones. Justice of the Peace Eloy Cano of Harlingen, Texas, issued an arrest warrant on Stern for disorderly conduct, which remained in place for a year after the incident.

The Howard Stern Show was syndicated to 26 stations nationwide by the end of 1995, and was the subject of two Billboard awards for Network/Syndicated Program of the Year in the modern rock and mainstream rock categories in 1996. In February 1996, Stern announced the Howard Stern Radio Network, an agreement that let him form a network consisting of radio personalities that he approved. Stations would be able to choose shows from a 24-hour menu or carry the network's programming around the clock. In November, the show relocated to a new studio in New York City, four times the size of its former location that housed space for bands to perform. Live performances increased then on, including those by Bush, Stone Temple Pilots, Cheap Trick and White Zombie, in the first four months. By the end of 1996, the show aired on 34 stations.

In December 1997, Martling began a six-week absence from the show as he was unable to reach an agreement with Infinity during contract negotiations. In mid-1998, Talkers magazine named the show as the most-listened to radio show in the US, with an estimated 17.5 million listeners each week. In the New York City area alone, one in four men aged 18–34 of the listening audience were tuning in.

The show aired on Canadian airwaves for the first time on September 2, 1997, to CHOM in Montreal and CILQ in Toronto. Stern's comments about French people and their language caused a rift with some listeners. "There is something about the language that turns you into a pussy-assed jack off... Anybody who speaks French is a scumbag. It turns you into a coward. Just like in World War II, they would not stick up for us. The French were the first ones to cave in to the Nazis, and certainly, certainly were over-productive for the Nazis, when they became their puppets." The show also received complaints from Canadian listeners for alleged sexist, racist, homophobic and improper sexual comments. Ratings for the two stations increased nonetheless by 62% and 47% respectively. Following listener complaints and censorship enforced by the Canadian Broadcast Standards Council and the Canadian Radio-television and Telecommunications Commission, the show was cancelled in Montreal in 1998 and in Toronto in 2001.

A day after the Columbine High School massacre in Littleton, Colorado, on April 20, 1999, Stern's comments regarding the incident drew criticism from some listeners. "There were some really good looking girls running out with their hands over their heads ... Did [the suspects] try to have sex with any of the good looking girls? ... At least if you are going to kill yourself and kill all the kids, why wouldn't you have some sex? ... If I was going to kill some people, I'd take them out with sex." Hundreds complained to KXPK, the show's affiliate in Denver. Stern argued his comments were taken out of context, and accused critics of being overly sensitive. "I dared to ask if kids had sex. So what? That's how I think. I had zero intent to make fun of the situation. The point in making that comment was an attempt to try to understand a motive. We didn't know anything about motives [the morning after] and were trying to consider all possibilities."

In May 1999, Stern made headlines after former child star Dana Plato committed suicide one day after visiting the show. Plato had been living in Tulsa, Oklahoma, surrounded by rumors of her sexuality and drug abuse, which became the biggest topic of the interview. After telling Stern she had been sober for over a decade and denying rumors about her lesbian relationship, some callers accused her of lying. At some point Stern suggested that Plato do a urinalysis to prove them wrong, while Plato agreed to give a hair sample for analysis. Plato was crying several times, mostly while offering her gratitude to callers who believed everything she had said. Stern also asked her if she had ever considered suicide to which she replied, "Hell no. I've got a beautiful boy. I'm OK in my skin. I'm OK with who I am." Plato died of a drug overdose the next day.

=== 2000–2005: Staff changes and terrestrial radio departure ===
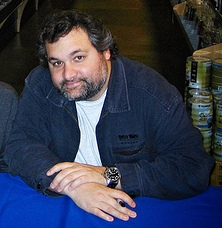
Comedian and actor Artie Lange replaced Jackie Martling in 2001.

In December 2000, Stern renewed his contract with Infinity Broadcasting to continue the radio show for five years. Industry analysts questioned Stern's relevance as the show's ratings had declined since 1998, including a 20 per cent drop in listeners in Los Angeles. Broadcasting & Cable reasoned the decline to Stern's separation from his wife in late 1999 which made him "considerably less intriguing".

In March 2001, Stern announced the departure of Martling, who was unable to reach an agreement over a new contract with WXRK. A "Win Jackie's Money" contest began where comedians auditioned for Martling's spot by sitting in on shows. Craig Gass, Doug Stanhope, Richard Jeni, Jim Florentine, A.J. Benza, and Ron Zimmerman were among the participants. In October, comedian and actor Artie Lange joined the show full-time.

Stern aired live during the terrorist attacks on September 11, 2001, and continued to broadcast with most of his staff until around 12:15 pm. The live reporting was one of the first for those listening across the country, with callers sharing their own experiences. In September 2006, a 90-minute special featuring the staff and their recollections of the day aired on Howard TV, titled 9.11.01: A Retrospective.

In September 2003, the FCC declared the show a "bona fide news interview program", making it exempt from equal-time requirements placed for political candidates.

On February 27, 2004, John Melendez left the show to become the announcer on The Tonight Show with Jay Leno. Stern accused Leno of stealing his segments such as goofy red carpet interviews and booking Kenneth Keith Kallenbach, a member of the show's Wack Pack. On March 17, a "Win John's Job" contest was announced that allowed regular contributors and callers the opportunity to replace Melendez. Richard Christy, a former electrician and drummer of various death and heavy metal bands including Iced Earth and Death, won with 30% of the listener vote. Former stockbroker Sal Governale, the runner-up with 24%, was also hired in September.

On February 26, 2004, Stern was cancelled on six stations owned by Clear Channel Communications after a caller used the word "nigger" when asking Rick Salomon if he ever had sex with a black person the day before. Following the issue of a $495,000 fine to Clear Channel by the FCC, which cited sexual discussions on a show from 2003, Stern was removed permanently on the six stations. Stern returned to four of the six markets that he was suspended from, as well as five new ones, on Infinity-owned stations on July 19. The April 1, 2004 broadcast featured an April Fool's Day prank where the show was supposedly cancelled and replaced with Cross and Lopez, a new show that promised "fun without the filth".

On October 6, 2004, Stern announced his five-year contract with Sirius Satellite Radio, a subscription-based satellite radio service, free from the FCC's regulations. A contributing factor in the decision was the aftermath of the Super Bowl XXXVIII halftime show controversy which began the tightening of censorship and regulation in broadcasting. The deal, worth approximately $100 million a year for all costs, included a bonus stock payment of $83 million for Stern in January 2007 for surpassing subscriber goals set in 2004. Promotion of Sirius met with controversy as Stern mentioned the service on air, instructing listeners in purchasing receivers and subscriptions. In one incident, Farid Suleman of Citadel Broadcasting billed Stern $200,000 for the continual advertising mentions. On November 8, 2005, Stern was suspended for one day for excessive promotion of the service; after moving to Sirius, Stern called the suspension a ploy by CBS to bolster its $500 million lawsuit against Stern in early 2006. CBS ultimately received 0.4% of the money it had sought. Sirius paid $2 million to CBS, and CBS relinquished full ownership of Stern's 20-year archive of broadcast content to Sirius.

Stern hosted his final show on terrestrial radio on December 16, 2005. A stage was built outside the studio for Stern, his colleagues and Wack Pack members to make their farewell speeches. In his closing speech, Stern thanked the New York City Police Department, dedicating the show to Sergeant Keith Manning, a friend who at the time was serving in Iraq. When off the air, Stern traveled to the Hard Rock Cafe in Times Square on an open-top bus and met Martha Stewart, who was broadcasting on her own Sirius channel, Martha Stewart Living Radio. Stern's contract with Infinity Broadcasting expired at midnight on December 31. The show was syndicated to as many as 60 markets across the United States and Canada, and gained a peak audience of 20 million listeners. In the New York market the show was the highest-rated morning program consecutively for seven years between 1994 and 2001. Stern's successor in various East Coast affiliates, The David Lee Roth Show, attracted a market share of 1.8% in January 2006, which was down from 7.9% that Stern acquired a month previous. Stern was replaced with The Adam Carolla Show on numerous West Coast affiliates, and the still airing Rover's Morning Glory in mostly Midwestern markets.

=== 2006–2012: move to SiriusXM Radio ===
A studio constructed at Sirius for the show in 2005

The Howard Stern Show made its debut broadcast on Sirius on January 9, 2006. The show began with Also sprach Zarathustra with added flatulence sound effects. George Takei then introduced himself as the show's new announcer. 180,000 Sirius radios were activated a day before. Stern read out the list of revelations for the show's "Revelations Game", where staff told an unknown secret about themselves.

Howard's two Sirius channels had in fact launched in advance of his on-air debut. Howard 100 and Howard 101 went live in September 2005 while Stern was still under contract at terrestrial radio, and were used to establish the show's satellite-radio brand before his first Sirius broadcast in January 2006.

In May 2006, Stern claimed he had received offers from three major companies to return to terrestrial radio. Although he would never return, Stern did mention that it would be "cool to go back and kick their asses." Although the names of the companies were never revealed, media organizations announced that Stern was considering a return. To clear up the rumors, the Associated Press were called on-air on May 10. "The story is I wouldn't do terrestrial radio for any reason", said Stern. Rumors once again arose in September 2006 that Stern would be returning, and were once again denied by Stern and Sirius. Sirius representative Patrick Reilly told United Press International that there were never "any discussions of Howard Stern in any way, shape, or form being anything but exclusive to Sirius. Published reports suggesting otherwise are wrong."

Stern announced on June 7, 2006, that the lawsuit settlement with CBS Radio finally gave Sirius the exclusive rights to his entire back catalog of broadcasts from WXRK, totalling almost 23,000 hours. It was reported that Sirius agreed to pay CBS $2 million for the rights, equating to around $87 per-hour of tape. On December 2, 2009, it was announced that every tape had been digitized on a server taking up multiple terabytes of data.

After a suicide attempt in January 2010, Lange left the show.

=== 2013–2019: contract renewals and show evolution ===
On December 9, 2010, Stern announced the signing of a new five-year contract with Sirius XM which ended in December 2015. In September 2013, Howard TV's contract was not renewed and the service ended.

Stern announced in February 2015 that he ended up partnering with Whalerock Industries to develop an Internet hub for Stern-related content tentatively called “Howard 360”, which was planned as a video streaming service. On December 15, 2015, Stern announced he signed a new deal with SiriusXM to continue his radio show until December 2020. The agreement also included a 12-year deal granting SiriusXM the rights to his radio and video archives and plans for a new video streaming venture which eventually evolved into the SiriusXM app. The “Howard 360” project was never realized.

Coverage in the mid-2010s increasingly focused on Stern's emergence as a long-form interviewer. Writing in 2015 and 2016, The Washington Post and The New York Times described a noticeable shift in the show's tone away from its earlier shock-driven style and toward extended celebrity conversations, with the latter calling Stern "one of the most deft and engrossing celebrity interviewers in the business".

In 2015 and 2016, The New York Times and The Washington Post addressed changes in the show's direction, with an emphasis on celebrity interviews and change in tone. The New York Times wrote: "Scattered among the gleefully vulgar mainstays are now long, starkly intimate live exchanges—character excavations that have made Mr. Stern one of the most deft and engrossing celebrity interviewers in the business and a sought-after stop for stars selling a movie or setting the record straight." Amongst the changes to the show, some Wack Pack members have been given less offensive names; Wendy the Retard was renamed Wendy the Slow Adult. During an interview with Madonna, Stern said of his earlier years in radio, "I used to say bad things about everybody ... I was an angry young man." Former staff member Jackie Martling commented, "Howard has become a lot of the things that he always told people not to become", while John Melendez said, "There's nothing wrong with change, but the old Howard would probably goof on the new Howard now." The Wall Street Journal attributed Stern's softening image to his chief operating officer, Marci Turk.

In October 2019, the show aired live from Los Angeles to commemorate the opening of a new SiriusXM studio. This marked the show's first broadcasts outside New York City since 2004.

=== 2020–2023: COVID-19 pandemic ===
In March 2020, the show shifted to broadcasts from Stern's home studio during the COVID-19 pandemic.

In June 2020, Stern faced criticism for a 1993 sketch from his New Year's Rotten Eve Pageant special in which Stern parodied Ted Danson's Friars Club appearance by wearing blackface and repeatedly using the N-word and other racial slurs. Addressing the renewed controversy, Stern stated: "The shit I did was fucking crazy ... I'll be the first to admit. I won't go back and watch those old shows; it's like, who is that guy. But that was my shtick, that's what I did and I own it." Quivers and Stern both stated that both he and the show have "evolved" over the years.

In the summer of 2021, Stern spoke out strongly against Americans who refused to receive the SARS-CoV-2 vaccine and called for mandatory vaccinations, saying "When are we gonna stop putting up with the idiots in this country and just say it's mandatory to get vaccinated? Fuck 'em. Fuck their freedom". Stern also called for the firing of professional athletes who are misleading about their vaccination status, and mocked on his radio show other talk show hosts who spoke out against the vaccine and subsequently died from COVID-19.

On October 31, 2022, the show aired with Stern in-person from the New York studio for the first time since the COVID-19 lockdown began, when Bruce Springsteen made his first in-studio appearance on the program, the interview was later repackaged as the HBO special “The Howard Stern Interview: Bruce Springsteen”.

In May 2023, the show aired from Miami to commemorate the opening of another new SiriusXM studio. This was only the second time in 3 years the show broadcast from a studio since the COVID-19 pandemic began.

=== 2024–present: show downsizing, HBO Max ===
The show's political interviews became especially prominent during the 2024 presidential campaign. On April 26, 2024, Stern conducted his first interview with a sitting U.S. president when Joe Biden appeared live on the program during a trip to New York. On October 8, 2024, Vice President Kamala Harris also appeared on the show as part of a broader media push in the final month of the campaign.

In September 2025, Stern returned from summer break with an on-air prank in which Andy Cohen briefly posed as his replacement, prompting false reports that Stern had left SiriusXM before Stern came on and revealed the bit. Later that year, on December 16, 2025, Stern announced a new three-year contract extension with SiriusXM.

In July 2026, Stern laid off roughly a dozen staffers and announced that, beginning after Labor Day, The Howard Stern Show would air only one new episode per week, with the remainder of the schedule consisting of reruns and archival material. In August, SiriusXM announced that Howard 101 would cease broadcasting on September 1 and be replaced by Andy Cohen’s Radio Andy, leaving Howard 100 as Stern’s sole channel.

Beginning September 14, Howard 100 will introduce a new lineup that includes Wrap Up Wednesdays, an expanded version of Gary Dell’Abate and Jon Hein’s Wrap Up Show, along with additional programming drawn from Stern’s extensive archives. The SiriusXM app will also introduce Howard Stern Decades, organizing archival content from the 1980s, 1990s, 2000s, and 2010s. Additionally, SiriusXM and HBO Max announced an agreement to bring filmed episodes of The Howard Stern Show to the streaming service weekly, beginning September 17 and continuing each Thursday thereafter.

== FCC fines ==
From 1990 to 2004, the Federal Communications Commission (FCC) fined owners of radio stations that carried The Howard Stern Show a total of $2.5 million for indecent programming.

== Show staff ==
In addition to their regular behind-the-scenes responsibilities, some show staff regularly appear on-air with Stern for comedy bits, conversations with Stern and Quivers, and a variety of other content.

Current

- Howard Stern – host
- Robin Quivers – co-host
- Fred Norris – sound effects, in-studio comedian, writer, producer
- Gary Dell'Abate – executive producer, co-host of The Wrap-Up Show
- Jason Kaplan – executive producer
- Will Murray – senior producer, head writer
- Jon Hein – Executive Producer Howard 101, co-host of The Wrap-Up Show
- Steve Brandano – director of talent relations
- Richard Christy – writer, producer
- Sal "The Stockbroker" Governale – writer, producer
- JD Harmeyer – media content producer
- Chris Wilding – writer, producer
- Steve Nowicki – writer, producer
- Ronnie "The Limo Driver" Mund – correspondent
- Bob "Wolfie" Wolf – writer, producer
- Mike Pearlman – writer, producer

Former

- Jackie Martling – head writer, in-studio comedian
- Artie Lange – in-studio comedian
- Benjy Bronk – writer
- Billy West – impressionist, in-studio comedian
- Al Rosenberg – writer, performer
- "Stuttering John" Melendez – intern, call screener, celebrity interviewer
- Lisa Glasberg – Howard 100 News reporter
- Steve Langford – Howard 100 News reporter
- "High Pitch" Mike Morales – Howard 100 News producer
- Lee Davis – producer
- KC Armstrong – associate producer
- Scott "The Engineer" Salem – engineer
- Jon Leiberman – Howard 100 News reporter
- George Takei – announcer
- Brent Hatley – senior producer
- Shuli Egar – writer, producer, Howard 100 News reporter
- Mike Trainor – writer, producer
- Memet Walker – writer, producer
- Jonathan Blitt – writer, producer
- Rahsaan Rogers – producer, co-host of The Wrap-Up Show

Some former interns

- Steve Grillo
- Mike Gange
- Mitch Fatel
- Roz Weston
- Jimmy Pop

Timeline

== The Wack Pack ==
The Wack Pack is a group of people featured on the show, each of whom bears a signature trait, such as a skill, disability, or a unique personal appearance. On February 24, 2015, Stern and crew voted on an "official" list of Wack Pack members; there are 40 living and deceased members. Though since then, some more have joined.

- Angry Alice (formerly Crazy Alice)
- Asian Pete
- Beetlejuice
- Bigfoot
- Bigfoot (Mark Shaw)
- Blue Iris
- Celestine
- Cliff Palette
- Crackhead Bob
- Debbie the Cum Lady
- Debbie the Space Alien
- Eric the Actor (formerly Eric the Midget)
- Evil David Letterman
- Fran the Singing Psychic
- Fred the Elephant Boy
- Gary the Conqueror (formerly Gary the Retard)
- Hank the Angry Drunken Dwarf
- High Pitch Chris Mayhew
- High Pitch Erik
- High Register Sean (joined in 2019)
- Imran "Hanzi" Khan (banned)
- Irene the Leather Weather Lady
- Jeff the Drunk
- Jeff the Vomit Guy
- Joey Boots
- John the Stutterer
- Kenneth Keith Kallenbach
- Lenny Dykstra
- Marfan Mike
- Mark the Bagger
- Medicated Pete
- Melrose Larry Green
- Mick the Nerd
- Miss Howard Stern
- Monotone Matt
- Nicole Bass
- Riley Martin
- Siobhan the Transsexual
- Sour Shoes
- Tan Mom
- The Iron Sheik
- Underdog Lady
- Wendy the Slow Adult (formerly Wendy the Retard)

== Theme music ==
Opening

- "The Great American Nightmare" by Rob Zombie and Howard Stern (since 1999)
- "Tilt a Whirl" by Jimmie Vaughan (1994–1998)
- "In a Mellow Tone" by Duke Ellington (c. 1987 – 1994)
- "H.O.W.A.R.D S.T.E.R.N." by The Double-O Zeros (c. 1985)
- "They're Coming to Take Me Away, Ha-Haaa!" by Napoleon XIV (c. 1982)

Closing

- "Tortured Man" by Howard Stern and The Dust Brothers (since 1999)

== Sources ==
- Stern, Howard (1993). Private Parts (1st ed.). Simon & Schuster. ISBN 978-0-671-88016-3. OCLC 28968496.
- Colford, Paul (1997). Howard Stern: King of All Media (2nd ed.). St. Martin's Press. ISBN 978-0-312-96221-0.
- Lucaire, Luigi (1997). Howard Stern, A to Z: A Totally Unauthorized Guide. St. Martin's Griffin. ISBN 978-0-312-15144-7.
- Kamalipour, Yahya R.; Kuldip R. Rampal (2001). Media, Sex, Violence, and Drugs in the Global Village. Rowman & Littlefield. ISBN 978-0-7425-0061-7.
- Luerssen, John (2009). American Icon: The Howard Stern Reader. Rock Reader Books. ISBN 978-0-557-04204-3.
