= Fred Norris =

American actor

- Born: Fred Leo Nukis; July 9, 1955 (age 71); Willimantic, Connecticut, U.S.
- Education: Western Connecticut State University
- Occupation: Radio personality
- Years active: 1977–present
- Website: www.howardstern.com

Eric Fred Norris (born Fred Leo Nukis, July 9, 1955) is an American radio personality and the longest-tenured staff member of The Howard Stern Show, aside from Stern himself. He first met Howard Stern while working at WCCC-FM, a radio station in Hartford, Connecticut.

== Early life ==
Fred Norris was born the second of two sons to Valija Kronberg and Henry Nukis who were Latvian immigrants that settled in Manchester, Connecticut. He had a turbulent home life with his father who left the family when Norris was five-years-old. "There was always tension and rage, [...] My father had an alcohol problem. When Dad came home, you hid in the closet because there was always something going on you'd rather not be a part of." Fred spent most of his early childhood alone. His older brother, Robert, was also reported to be abusive. Fred would escape his trauma by reading books, taking long bicycle rides, or watching many afternoon TV reruns which developed into an encyclopedic knowledge of classic fifties TV. He once had spoken on-air, "I'd like to state for the record that every person on this show of Howard's, even Robin, at least had a father figure to guide them, [...] Me, I was on my own."

Despite the lack of guidance, Norris managed to navigate his adolescence without major incident. When Norris was 13, his mother married his stepfather, Lewis Norris, a cabinet maker, whom Norris credits with finally making his mother happy, and who generally treated him with respect. Around this time, he began playing guitar.

== Career ==
A college student at the time, Norris first met Howard Stern while working the overnight shifts at WCCC, an AM and FM radio station in Hartford, Connecticut in the spring of 1979. He continued at WCCC after Stern's departure; though he left the station in early 1981 to take a job at WAQY-FM in Springfield, Massachusetts.

When Stern became a ratings hit at WWDC in Washington, D.C. that year, he was able to use his success as leverage to persuade the station to hire Norris, who started as the producer on Stern's show in October 1981. He later moved with Stern to New York to work at WNBC in September 1982, and has been with the show ever since.

== Acting ==
Norris has also appeared in several small television and movie roles. He played a younger version of himself in Private Parts in 1997. He played a parking enforcement officer in Cruel Intentions in 1999 and a head shop owner named Leon on Law & Order: Special Victims Unit in 2013.

== Personal life ==
In 1994, Norris married Allison Furman, a woman he originally met on the "Dial-A-Date" segment of Stern's radio show broadcast on April 10, 1987. The couple have one daughter together, Tess, born in November 2002.

In 1993, Norris legally changed his name from Fred Leo Nukis to Eric Fred Norris. On the May 23, 1996 episode of The Howard Stern Show, Stern and the cast had an extended discussion with Norris about this. Norris did not reveal the motivation for the change. Although he did not like the name Fred, he kept it because "Fred Norris" was the name the public knew him by.

On the November 13, 2006 broadcast, Stern wondered if anyone ever called Norris by his legally changed name, Eric. Norris responded by stating that no one referred to him as Eric. He went into detail saying that was not the reason he changed his name in the first place. Stern revealed he was bewildered why Norris went to the lengths to legally change his name if nobody called him Eric. Norris said that the decision was based on the fact that he had a hostile relationship with his father.

== See also ==
- Howard 100
- Howard Stern
- Robin Quivers
- Artie Lange
- Gary Dell'Abate
