= Gary Dell'Abate =

American radio producer (born 20th century)

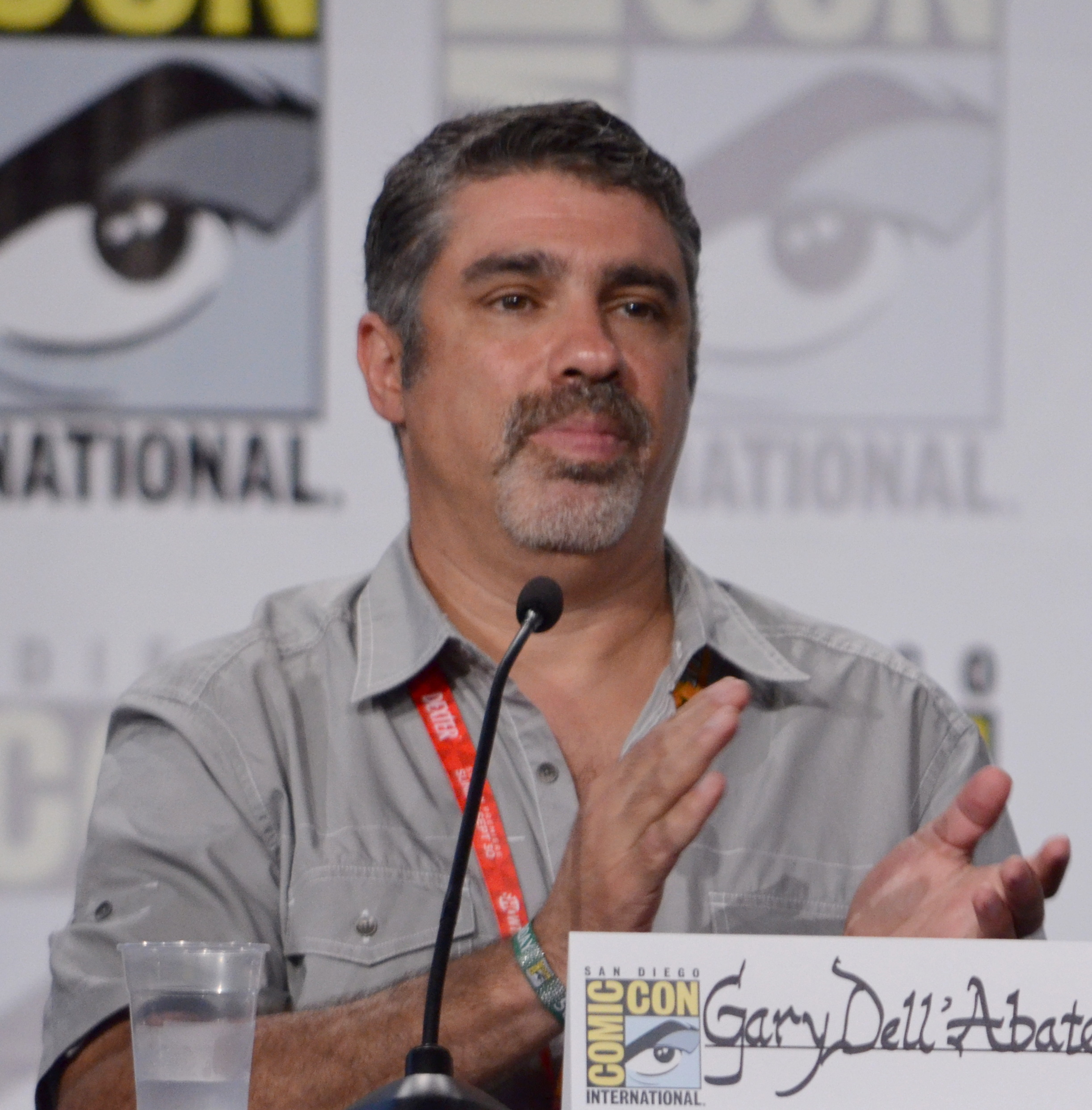
- Dell'Abate in 2012
- Born: March 14, 1961 (age 65); New York City, U.S.
- Other name: Baba Booey
- Education: Adelphi University
- Occupation: Radio producer
- Years active: 1984 – present
- Spouse: Mary Caracciolo (m. 1992)
- Children: 2

Gary Dell'Abate (born March 14, 1961) (/dɛləˈbɑːteɪ/), also known by the nickname Baba Booey, is an American radio producer who has been the executive producer of The Howard Stern Show since 1984. His autobiography, They Call Me Baba Booey, was released in 2010.

== Early life and education ==
Dell'Abate comes from a large Italian-American family. His father, Salvatore Dell'Abate, was a salesman for Häagen-Dazs ice cream, while his mother, Ellen (née Cotroneo), was a food demonstrator at Macy's in New York City and Fortunoff on Long Island.

Dell'Abate attended Adelphi University, receiving the Richard F. Clemo Award in his senior year, and he interned at several radio stations, including WLIR. While working with Roz Frank, a traffic reporter on WNBC, he came into contact with Howard Stern.

== Career ==
=== The Howard Stern Show ===
Dell'Abate has worked on The Howard Stern Show since September 4, 1984: originally on 66 WNBC, then syndicated through K-Rock in New York City, and later broadcast on Sirius XM Radio. Dell'Abate was originally hired for $150 a week, with duties including getting Stern's lunch and scheduling guests for the show.

==== Baba Booey ====
Previously nicknamed "Boy-Gary" (Howard called his college roommate Dr. Lew Weinstein "boy" when giving an order; preceded by "Boy" Lee Davis at WNBC), Dell'Abate's "Baba Booey" moniker originated on The Howard Stern Show on July 26, 1990, after telling a story of his prized collection of animation cels. In the course of discussing a Quick Draw McGraw cel he might purchase, he misstated the name of Quick Draw's sidekick Baba Looey as "Baba Booey". As is typical of the show, the rest of the cast "goofed" on his mistake, becoming especially merciless since he was mulling the purchase of a cel of a character without even knowing the character's correct name. Speaking to Stern at the end of the show, Dell'Abate said, "I think we've taken this as far as it will go." Stern replied, "Gary, we've only scratched the surface of this." Dell'Abate remains Baba Booey to this day. Eventually, he titled his autobiography They Call Me Baba Booey. Dell'Abate later recalled that when he watched the cartoon as a child, Quick Draw would often call Baba Looey "Baba Boy", usually in frantic moments ("Help me, Baba Boy!"). Quick Draw's drawn-out pronunciation of "boy" often sounded like "booey", which led Dell'Abate to think that the character's name was actually "Baba Booey".

"Baba Booey" as a term has become a catchphrase for fans of The Howard Stern Show and is often used during prank calls to live network television or radio broadcasts such as C-SPAN. For example, a call made by a prank caller nicknamed "Maury from Brooklyn" to ABC News during the low-speed police chase of O. J. Simpson's Ford Bronco through the streets of Brentwood, Los Angeles, California, signed off with "And Baba Booey to y'all!" Sportscaster Al Michaels explained to anchor Peter Jennings the significance of the phrase. In the 2012 Olympics, freestyle wrestler Jake Herbert yelled "Baba Booey" as the camera panned over Team USA during the opening ceremony. Since then it has become a trend in sporting events where concentration and silence are expected, for spectators to shout "Baba Booey!" as in the case of the PGA Tour as soon as a golfer has completed his swing.

== Personal life ==
Dell'Abate has been married since 1992 to Mary Dell'Abate (née Caracciolo). They have two sons.

After Dell'Abate's brother Steven died of AIDS in January 1991, Dell'Abate became a supporter of LIFEbeat: The Music Industry Fights AIDS and served as the charity's president.

Dell'Abate published his autobiography, They Call Me Baba Booey, in 2010. In the book, Dell'Abate tells the story of his brother's death from AIDS, his mother's struggle with depression, as well as his rise to executive producer of The Howard Stern Show.

Dell'Abate is a New York Mets fan, and, on May 9, 2009, threw out the ceremonial first pitch at a Mets game. The pitch did not go well, as it landed down the third-base line and hit an umpire. He later attended the 2015 World Series with fellow Howard Stern Show co-worker Richard Christy (who is a Kansas City Royals fan). In the 2021 ESPN documentary Once Upon a Time in Queens about the 1986 Mets, Dell'Abate showed off his vinyl copy of a team song from that season, “Let’s Go Mets Go.”

Dell'Abate is also a fan of the New York Islanders hockey team, and was interviewed for the 2012 book Dynasty: The Oral History of the New York Islanders, 1972–1984, by author Greg Prato. Dell'Abate's thoughts and memories of following the Islanders (he also interned for the television station that broadcast the team's games at the time, SportsChannel) are featured throughout the book, as well as several photos of Dell'Abate with Islanders players at a Stanley Cup victory parade in 1980.

On March 14, 2011, Dell'Abate was appointed to the Greenwich, Connecticut, Board of Parks and Recreation with a 119–64 vote margin. The Greenwich Town Meeting unanimously reappointed Dell'Abate to the Board on June 9, 2014.
