= Howard 100 =

Satellite radio channels

- Broadcast area: United States, Canada
- Frequency: SiriusXM 100
- Branding: Howard 100

Programming
- Format: Talk

Ownership
- Owner: Sirius XM Holdings

History
- First air date: September 29, 2005

Technical information
- Class: Satellite radio station

Links
- Website: www.siriusxm.com/Howard100

Howard 101
- Broadcast area: United States, Canada
- Frequency: SiriusXM 101
- Branding: Howard 101

Programming
- Format: Talk

Ownership
- Owner: Sirius XM Holdings

History
- First air date: September 29, 2005
- Last air date: August 31, 2026

Technical information
- Class: Satellite radio station

Links
- Website: www.siriusxm.com/Howard101

Howard 100 is an uncensored channel on SiriusXM, a satellite radio service that broadcasts programming affiliated with Howard Stern and The Howard Stern Show. Though the channel, along with a companion channel Howard 101, were first broadcast on September 29, 2005 with the former company Sirius Satellite Radio, Stern could not officially broadcast until January 1, 2006, as Stern was still at WXRK, the terrestrial radio station where he had to finish his FM radio contract. A merger of Sirius Satellite Radio and XM Satellite Radio occurred in the summer of 2008. During the time of the two channels existing separately, Howard 100 carried The Howard Stern Show live while Howard 101 carried tape-delayed broadcasts, encore presentations, and other uncensored talk hosts under Stern's employment, among them Bubba the Love Sponge and Scott Ferrall.

During the time satellite radio was directly monitored by what was then Arbitron, Howard 100 was the most-listened-to station on the Sirius platform (and all of satellite radio), with 1,210,000 of Sirius's 7,160,000 subscribers (a 17% share of the audience) listening to it in 2008; Howard 101 ranked third on that list with 501,100 listeners (a 7% share), behind Sirius's contemporary hit radio channel Sirius Hits.

As Stern reduced his workload in the mid-2020s and talent not directly tied to The Howard Stern Show departed the channels, the two channels became increasingly redundant, and the majority of the channels' staff was eliminated in two waves in February and July 2026. Internal discussions began in 2026 that would eliminate Howard 101 and merge its remaining programs onto Howard 100. SiriusXM confirmed this on August 28, and the channel was discontinued in a broader realignment of the SiriusXM lineup on September 1.

== Programming ==
As of 2026, The Howard Stern Show produces one new live show per week on Monday mornings, starting at 7:00 a.m. Eastern Time and lasting until whenever Stern wants to end. The remainder of the channel's programming comes from the program's archives.
