= Spiegel & Grau =

Multi-platform publisher founded by Celina Spiegel and Julie Grau

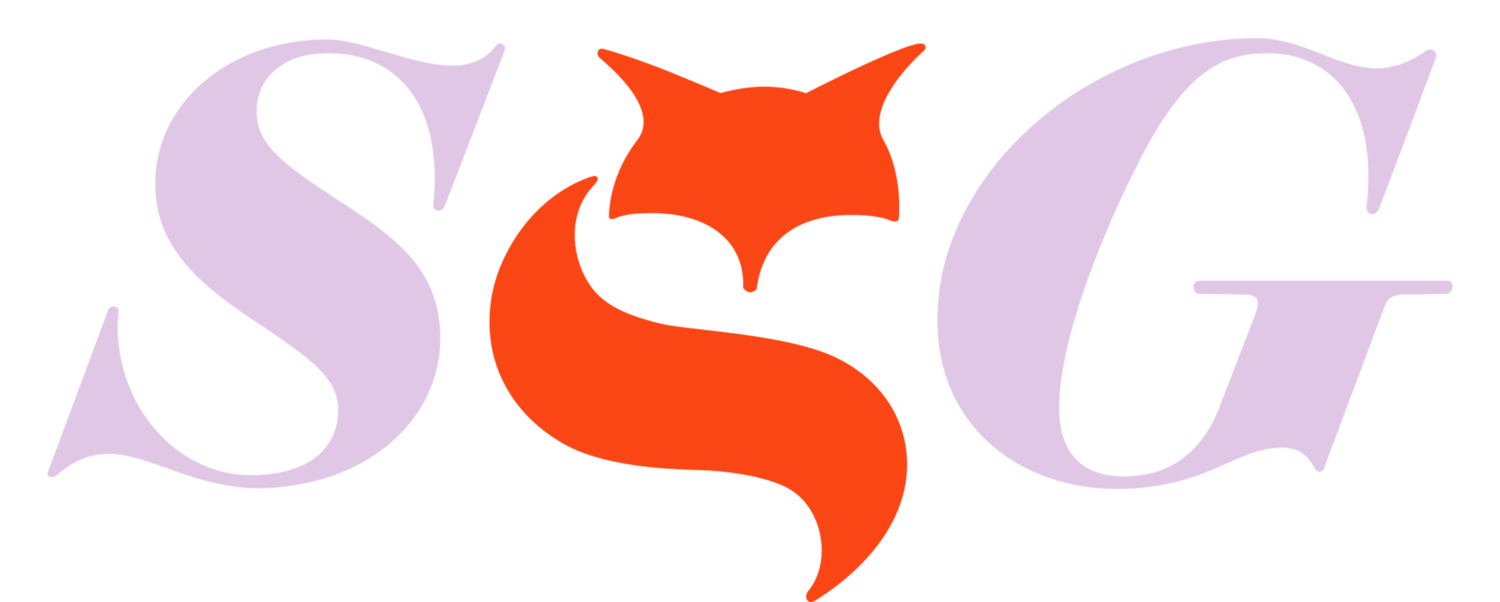
- Founded: 2005
- Founder: Celina Spiegel, Julie Grau
- Country of origin: United States
- Headquarters location: New York City, United States
- Nonfiction topics: Memoirs; journalism; self-help; history
- Official website: Spiegel & Grau

Spiegel & Grau is an American independent publisher based in New York. Led by Celina (Cindy) Spiegel and Julie Grau, Spiegel & Grau publishes upmarket and literary fiction, reported nonfiction, memoir, and prescriptive nonfiction.

== History ==
Spiegel & Grau was originally a publishing imprint of Penguin Random House founded by Celina Spiegel and Julie Grau in 2005.

On January 25, 2019, Penguin Random House announced that the imprint was being shut down and the two founders were leaving. While commercially successful, the imprint "became yet another casualty of corporate restructuring," according to the New York Times.

In 2020, founders Celina Spiegel and Julie Grau resurrected their publishing house under the name Spiegel & Grau. They said the independent publisher will produce 15 to 20 books a year, as well as original audiobooks and podcasts.

In 2021, Spiegel & Grau's first release as an independent entity, Fox and I: An Uncommon Friendship by Catherine Raven, became an instant New York Times bestseller.

== Authors ==
Spiegel and Grau's notable releases as an independent publisher include Catherine Raven's Fox and I: An Uncommon Friendship; Shelley Read's Go As a River; Margaret Renkl's The Comfort of Crows; and Melody Beattie's revised and updated Codependent No More. In 2026, Spiegel & Grau published the second novel by Kathryn Stockett, author of The Help.

Writers whose work has been published by Spiegel & Grau in the past include the following:

- Saher Alam (Note: The Groom to Have Been, winner of the 2008 Janet Heidinger Kafka Prize)
- Jennifer Arnold
- M. K. Asante
- Tash Aw (Note: Map of the Invisible World (2008))
- Stephen Batchelor
- Dan Baum
- Elaine Beale
- Melody Beattie
- Nate Berkus
- Anthony Bozza
- Diane Brady
- Joseph Braude
- Joe Brewster
- Janelle Brown
- Mike Brown
- Leslie T. Chang (Note: Factory Girls: From Village to City in a Changing China (2008), awarded the 2009 PEN USA Literary Award for Research Nonfiction)
- Alice Carrière
- Ta-Nehisi Coates
- Edward Conlon
- Karen Connelly
- Sampson Davis
- Rob Delaney
- Gary Dell'Abate
- Barbara Demick (Note: Nothing to Envy (2009), awarded the BBC Samuel Johnson Prize for Non-Fiction and a National Book Award for Nonfiction finalist)
- Beth Ditto
- Dagmara Dominczyk
- Ellen Feldman
- Shelley Frisch
- Miriam Gershow
- Clio Goodman
- Emily Fox Gordon
- David Graeber
- Cary Groner
- Sara Gruen
- Christina Haag
- Hilary Thayer Hamann
- Yuval Noah Harari
- Václav Havel
- Jane Hedley-Prole
- Ayaan Hirsi Ali
- Eddie Huang
- David Javerbaum
- Jay-Z
- Jeff Johnson
- Mary Johnson
- Mat Johnson (Note: Pym (2011))
- Jane Kamensky
- Piper Kerman
- Sana Krasikov
- Nicholas D. Kristof
- Lang Lang
- Artie Lange (Note: Too Fat to Fish (2008), co-written with Anthony Bozza)
- Adam Langer
- Victor LaValle
- Aliza Lavie
- Jill Lepore
- James A. Levine
- Elizabeth Little
- Mike Loew
- Phillip Lopate
- Meg Lukens Noonan
- Norm Macdonald
- Somaly Mam
- Ndaba Mandela
- Adam Mansbach
- Marc Maron
- Yann Martel
- James Maskalyk
- Jerry McGill
- Philipp Meyer (Note: American Rust (2009), winner of a Los Angeles Times Book Prize)
- Barry Michels
- Chad Millman
- Liza Monroy
- Wes Moore
- Tracy Morgan (Note: I Am the New Black (2009), co-written with Anthony Bozza)
- Grant Morrison
- Patricia Morrisroe
- John Moynihan
- Blake Mycoskie
- Jeanne Nolan
- Trevor Noah
- Arika Okrent
- Suze Orman
- Lisa Frazier Page
- Iain Pears (Note: Stone's Fall (2009))
- Joseph Peter
- Sidney Poitier
- Richard David Precht
- Jessica Queller
- Beth Raymer
- Steven Rinella
- David Ritz
- Jim Robbins
- Margaret Robison
- Nile Rodgers
- Domenica Ruta
- Sharon Sakson
- Catherine Sanderson
- Ari Shavit
- Lee Siegel
- Warren St. John
- Michelle Stephenson
- Howard Stern
- Bryan Stevenson
- Caroline Stoessinger
- Rebecca Stott (Note: Darwin's Ghosts: In Search of the First Evolutionists (2012))
- Phil Stutz
- Adeena Sussman
- D. F. Swaab
- Marianne Szegedy-Maszak
- Matt Taibbi (Note: Griftopia: Bubble Machines, Vampire Squids, and the Long Con That Is Breaking America (2010))
- Michelle Tea
- Alison Thompson
- Steve Toltz (Note: U.S. publisher of A Fraction of the Whole (2008), shortlisted for the Man Booker Prize)
- Karen Valby
- Elise Valmorbida
- Shankar Vedantam
- Michael Walker
- Carol Wallace
- Alice Waters
