= Kevin Brennan (comedian) =

American stand-up comedian and podcaster

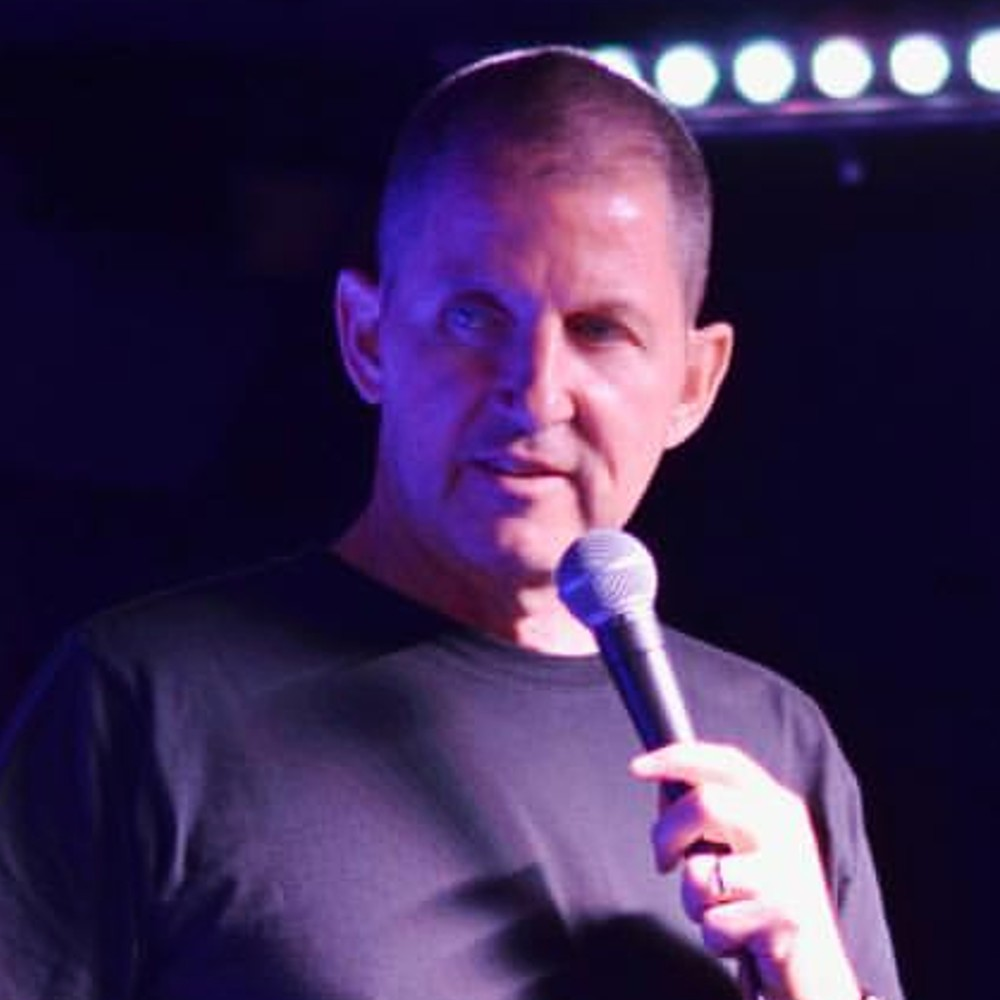
- Brennan at The Stand Comedy Club in 2019
- Born: Chicago, Illinois, U.S.
- Notable work: Weekend Update; Sports Show with Norm Macdonald; Red Eye w/ Tom Shillue
- Relatives: Neal Brennan (brother)

Comedy career
- Years active: 1980s–2025
- Medium: Stand-up; television; podcast
- Genre: Observational comedy
- Subjects: Racism; sexism

X information
- Handle: @mlcpodcast

YouTube information
- Channel: MLC Podcast
- Years active: 2016–present
- Subscribers: 15.1 thousand
- Views: 85.4 thousand
- Last updated: April 24, 2026
- Website: www.kevinbrennan.com

Kevin Brennan is an American retired stand-up comedian, podcaster, and writer. He is the host of the Misery Loves Company podcast, and is best known for his work on Saturday Night Live's Weekend Update in 1999 and 2000.

Brennan was voted "Best Comedian" at the 2005 Aspen Comedy Festival and his half-hour stand-up special was featured on HBO that same year. He was featured on the 2007 cross-Canada Just for Laughs comedy tour and performed at the Just for Laughs festival in Montreal in 2009. He was also a repeat panelist on Red Eye w/ Tom Shillue in 2016 and 2017.

== Early life ==
Brennan was born in Chicago to an Irish Catholic family and has nine siblings including brother Neal. The family also lived in Philadelphia.

== Career ==
=== Early career (1980s–1998) ===
Brennan first started stand-up in Chicago in the 1980s at the suggestion of a coworker at a restaurant where he was working. He moved to New York City in 1987 to further pursue a career in stand-up comedy.

Within two years of moving to New York City, Brennan was hosting open mics and other comedy shows at the Boston Comedy Club, a now defunct comedy club in New York City. By the early 1990s he was appearing on A&E's stand-up comedy series An Evening at the Improv and Caroline's Comedy Hour.

In 1993, Brennan appeared on the entertainment competition show Star Search where he competed unsuccessfully against 19-year-old Dave Chappelle.

Brennan first appeared as a guest on Late Night with Conan O'Brien in 1994 and went on to make multiple appearances on the show from 1995 to 2007.

In 1997, Brennan appeared in a small role in the film Half Baked, which was co-written by his brother Neal Brennan and Chappelle. By this time Brennan was established in the New York comedy circuit and had appeared twice on Late Show with David Letterman. That same year the Brennan brothers had a development deal with NBC and Universal for a sitcom based on their own experiences growing up in an Irish-Catholic family with 10 kids in Philadelphia.

=== Saturday Night Live (1999–2000) ===
Brennan was a writer for Saturday Night Live in 1999 and 2000 and also appeared on the show as a Weekend Update correspondent in two episodes of the show's 25th season while Colin Quinn held the anchor post. Quinn left Saturday Night Live in 2000 and Brennan was in contention for the anchor position but, after the job was given to Jimmy Fallon and Tina Fey, Brennan decided not to return as a writer for the following season.

=== Post Saturday Night Live (2001–present) ===
From 2003 to 2005 Brennan made multiple appearances on Last Call with Carson Daly. Brennan was voted “Best Comedian” at the 2005 Aspen Comedy Festival, which led to his half-hour stand-up special on the HBO series One Night Stand that same year. He was one of six comedians featured on the 2007 cross-Canada Just for Laughs comedy tour, which also featured Greg Behrendt, John Wing, Louis Ramey, Fiona O'Loughlin and Tom Papa. He also performed at the Just For Laughs festival in Montreal in 2009. In 2011, Brennan wrote for the Comedy Central series Sports Show with Norm Macdonald.

==== Misery Loves Company ====
Misery Loves Company
- Genre: Comedy; Talk; Entertainment; Culture; Satire
- Format: Audio & video
- Language: English

Creative team
- Created by: Kevin Brennan

Cast and voices
- Hosted by: Kevin Brennan

Production
- Production: Adam Hiniker (2018-2024)
- Length: 90 – 240 min.

Publication
- No. of episodes: 641 (Patreon) (as of September 25, 2023)
- Original release: January 2016
- Provider: SoundBetter (2018-2024)

Related
- Website: Patreon (Premium audio and video, and livestream archives); YouTube (Video and livestreams)

Brennan started the podcast Misery Loves Company (MLC) in January 2016, and added fellow New York-based comedian Lenny Marcus as his co-host. Marcus quit the podcast after ten months following several on-air and off-air disagreements between the two comedians.

==== Burning Bridges ====
In 2017, Compound Media owner and former Opie and Anthony radio personality Anthony Cumia, a fan of Brennan's tirades against other comedians on Misery Loves Company (including Brennan's brother, Neal), brought Brennan to his Compound Media network, where Brennan hosted Burning Bridges with co-host Brian Mccarthy. Brennan and Mccarthy left Compound Media in 2019.

== Other ventures ==
In 2018 he produced a live comedy show in New York City called White Guys Matter that was billed as "all white guys" and "no safe spaces" with the promise to "make comedy great again." Comedian Aaron Berg, who performed at the New York show, brought the show to Yuk Yuk's comedy club in Toronto, Canada that same year, causing several local comedians to take to social media to protest the show.

Brennan played himself in an episode of Pete Holmes' HBO series Crashing that aired in 2019. A roast of Kevin Brennan was held at The Stand comedy club in New York City that same year. Roasters at the event included comedians Dan Soder, Jim Norton (in character as Chip Chipperson), Krystyna Hutchinson and Corinne Fischer of the Guys We Fucked podcast, Patty Rosborough, Chad Zumock and Mike Bocchetti.

In October 2022, Brennan, along with fellow comedian Bob Levy, opened a comedy club called the Brennan & Levy's Comedy Loft in Vineland, New Jersey.

Brennan announced his retirement from comedy on March 10, 2025, during his Misery Loves Company podcast. He later came out of retirement to perform at Rodney's New York Comedy Club on May 2nd, 2026, headlined by Bob Levy, Barry Ribs and Chad Zumock. Brennan arranged this stand-up event to further his feud with rival podcaster Stuttering John Melendez who had previously performed at the comedy club.

== Comedic style ==
Brennan's delivery has been described as "laid-back" and "laconic". He is also known for insult comedy directed at members of the audience, and for jokes about racism, pedophilia and misogyny. As his podcast title Burning Bridges suggests, Brennan is also known for confrontational and untrue statements about other comedians and podcasters. Brennan drew public criticism for his remarks about the unexpected death of Friends actor Matthew Perry on social media, in late October 2023.

== Personal life ==
Brennan is married and resides in New Jersey. His youngest brother is Neal Brennan, comedian and co-creator of Chappelle's Show.

Brennan was romantically involved with, and the first sexual partner of, comedienne Sarah Silverman which she has confirmed publicly in her memoir, social media and interview. Silverman bloodied their bedsheets postcoitus which indicated to Brennan she was a virgin. Brennan was the one who ended the relationship.

== Filmography ==
=== Film ===
Year	Title	Role	Notes	Ref.
1998	Half Baked	Pothead		
2008	Turbocharge: The Unauthorized Story of The Cars	Alan Hunter		

=== Television ===
Year	Title	Role	Notes	Ref.
1990, 1992	An Evening at the Improv	Self	Season 6, Episode 17 (October 20, 1990) Season 9, Episode 2 (January 4, 1992)	
1994–2007	Late Night with Conan O'Brien	Self	Season 1, Episode 147 Pam Dawber/Dixie Carter/Kevin Brennan (April 21, 1994) Season 3, Episode 56 Garth Brooks/Kevin Brennan/Kimberly Williams (December 12, 1995); Season 5, Episode 89 Scott Wolf/Flea/Kevin Brennan (March 5, 1998); Season 6, Episode 34 Jennifer Love Hewitt/Marc Maron/Kevin Brennan (November 19, 1998); Season 10, Episode 4 Topher Grace/Jamie-Lynn Sigler/Kevin Brennan (September 6, 2002); Season 13, Episode 36 Reese Witherspoon/Jon Favreau/Kevin Brennan (November 15, 2005); Season 14, Episode 90 Serena Williams/Donal Logue/Kevin Brennan (February 1, 2007); Season 14, Episode 132 Kevin Brennan (April 23, 2007); Season 14, Episode 200 Kevin Brennan (September 4, 2007)	
1996	Tompkins Square	Self	Season 1, Episode 2	
1997	Late Show with David Letterman	Self	September 21, 1994; January 17, 1997	
1999	Comedy Central Presents	Self	Season 1, Episode 8 (January 19, 1999)	
2000	Saturday Night Live	Self	Season 25, Episode 14 Joshua Jackson/'N Sync (March 11, 2000) Season 25, Episode 18 John Goodman/Neil Young (May 6, 2000)	
2002	Dr. Katz, Professional Therapist	Ken (voice)	Season 6, Episode 17 (February 13, 2002)	
2003, 2005	Last Call with Carson Daly	Self	February 14, 2003; October 3, 2003; April 2, 2004; November 11, 2004; February 25, 2005; July 22, 2005	
2005	One Night Stand	Self	Season 1, Episode 3 Kevin Brennan September 2, 2005	
2009	Just for Laughs	Self	Season 1, Episode 4 Martin Short (October 19, 2009)	
2016, 2017	Red Eye w/ Tom Shillue	Self (Panelist)	June 22, 2016; August 31, 2016; October 5, 2016; December 20, 2016; February 7, 2017; March 10, 2017; March 29, 2017	
2018	WGN Morning News	Self	August 17, 2018	
2018	Porsalin	Self	Almost Famous: A Kevin Brennan Documentary (March 27, 2021)	
2019	Crashing	Self	Season 3, Episode 6 The Viewing Party (February 24, 2019)	
