= Mike Lawrence (comedian) =

American comedian (born 1983)

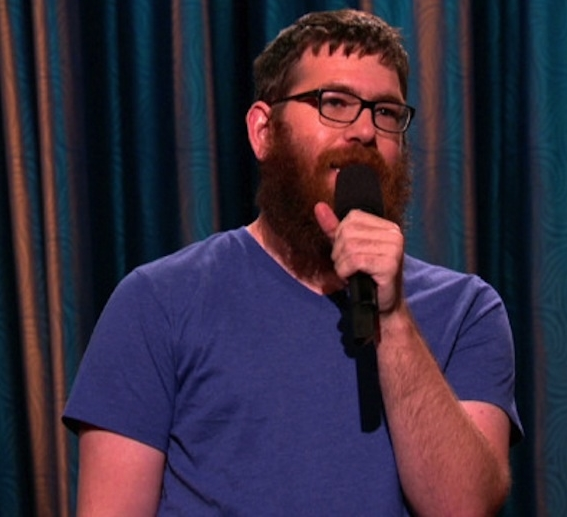
- Born: Michael Patrick Lawrence; January 14, 1983 (age 43); Miami, Florida, U.S.
- Education: Florida Atlantic University (BA)
- Spouse: Adina Pliskin
- Children: 1

Comedy career
- Years active: 2005–present
- Medium: Stand-up
- Website: www.mikelawrencecomedy.com

Michael Patrick Lawrence (born January 14, 1983) is an American comedian and writer from Davie, Florida. He formerly lived in New York City and currently lives in Los Angeles.

== Early life ==
Lawrence was born in Miami but grew up in Davie, Florida. He attended Western High School and earned a bachelor's degree from Florida Atlantic University in English.

When he was 16 years old, he began working at a McDonald's in southern Florida. He attributes his ability to deal with hecklers to his time spent at McDonald's working the drive-thru. In his podcast interview on WTF with Marc Maron, he stated, "Heckling doesn't bother me because I've been yelled at for McNuggets."

== Career ==
Lawrence started his career at the age of 15 by performing poetry at open mic nights in 1998. After realizing that the part he liked most about it was making people laugh, he moved to comedy.

In 2010, Lawrence was named one of the New Faces at the largest comedy festival in the world, Just for Laughs. He later performed at the festival in 2012 at both the Montreal and Chicago festivals. While in Montreal, he recorded a set for HBO Canada's Funny as Hell.

In 2011, Lawrence performed at Lance Bangs' Come Laugh With Us at the Bridgetown Comedy Festival with fellow features Kristen Schaal, Fred Armisen, Jon Daly, and Brett Gelman. Mike also performed on John Oliver's New York Stand-Up Show with fellow features Hannibal Buress, Michael Ian Black, and Hari Kondabolu. He regularly opened for Oliver soon after.

In 2012, Lawrence also made his first appearance on Conan O'Brien's TV show, Conan.

In 2013, his comedy album Sadamantium was released by Comedy Central Records in conjunction with his half-hour special on The Half Hour. Sadamantium was recorded at the Nerdist Showroom at Meltdown Comics. The album received positive reviews from The Huffington Post, The A.V. Club, America's Comedy, and The Laugh Button. In September, he wrote a piece for The Huffington Post called The Five Most Important Things I've Learned Doing Comedy in New York That I'd Pass on To Newer Comics where he shares his feelings about comedy and his career. He performed again on Conan in this year. Lawrence wrote a piece for and was a guest on W. Kamau Bell's show Totally Biased.

In 2016, Mike won the first season of Roast Battle hosted by Jeff Ross.

=== Podcasts ===
Lawrence hosts the Nerd of Mouth podcast with Jake Young and Holden McNeely on the Los Angeles-based Last Podcast Network. Episodes are published weekly. Topics discussed on the podcast include comic books, video games, TV shows, and movies; things that Lawrence enjoys. Lawrence and the podcast were featured on an episode of Toy Hunter in the episode called Nerd of Mouth, in 2013.

Lawrence has also been a guest on many notable podcasts, including You Know What Dude! with comedian Robert Kelly, You Made It Weird with comedian Pete Holmes, WTF podcast with comedian Marc Maron, The Adam Carolla Show with Adam Carolla, Keith and The Girl with Keith Malley, The K Ohle Show with Kurt Braunohler, Hollywood Handbook with Sean Clements and Hayes Davenport, The Artie Lange Show hosted by comedian Artie Lange, "What Say You?" with Brian "Q" Quinn and Sal Vulcano of Impractical Jokers, and "What Do You Know?" with Joel Heyman of Rooster Teeth.

== Personal life ==
He has one brother and sister. Lawrence married Adina Pliskin in 2014.

In 2021 Lawrence was diagnosed as being on the autism spectrum.

== Filmography ==
=== Television ===
Year	Title	Role	Notes
2011–2012	John Oliver's New York Stand-Up Show	Himself	Two episodes
2012	Naked Truth	Writer	TBS pilot for panel comedy show hosted by Tom Papa
2012–2013	Conan	Himself	Guest comedian
2013	The Half Hour	Himself	
2013	Totally Biased with W. Kamau Bell	Himself	One episode. Wrote a piece for the show.
2013	Toy Hunter	Himself	Featured in the episode Nerd of Mouth
2013–2014	@midnight	Himself	Five episodes
2016	Roast Battle	Himself	First Place Winner
2018	Comedy Central Stand-Up Presents	Himself	

== Discography ==
- Sadamantium (2013)
