= Crashing (American TV series) =

American television comedy series

- Genre: Comedy drama
- Created by: Pete Holmes
- Starring: Pete Holmes
- Composer: Lyle Workman
- Country of origin: United States
- Original language: English
- No. of seasons: 3
- No. of episodes: 24

Production
- Executive producers: Pete Holmes; Judd Apatow; Dave Rath; Josh Church; Igor Srubshchik; Judah Miller
- Camera setup: Single-camera
- Running time: 27–33 minutes
- Production companies: Joy Quota; Apatow Productions; HBO Originals

Original release
- Network: HBO
- Release: February 19, 2017 – March 10, 2019

Crashing is an American comedy-drama television series created by Pete Holmes and executive produced by Holmes and occasional series director Judd Apatow. The series aired on HBO in the United States from February 19, 2017, to March 10, 2019, for a total of three seasons. The semi-autobiographical show revolves around a fictional version of Holmes, a comedian who pursues a career in stand-up comedy after his wife cheats on him, leaving him homeless. Several comedians play themselves in recurring roles, including Artie Lange and T. J. Miller, while others have guest appearances.

After Holmes successfully pitched the idea of the show to Apatow, he completed a script of its pilot episode. HBO picked it up for filming in September 2015, with Apatow as director. The success of the pilot led HBO to give the green light to the first season in January 2016. After four episodes had aired, HBO renewed the series for a second season, which premiered on January 14, 2018.

On February 21, 2018, HBO renewed the series for a third season, which premiered on January 20, 2019. On March 8, 2019, Holmes announced on Twitter that Crashing would not be picked up for a fourth season. He suggested that the series might conclude with a film adaptation.

== Cast ==
=== Main ===
- Pete Holmes as a fictional 30-something comedian. Pete aspired to be a youth pastor before he became a standup comedian.
- Artie Lange as himself
- Lauren Lapkus as Jessica, Pete's ex-wife
- George Basil as Leif, an art teacher

=== Recurring ===
- Dov Davidoff as Jason Webber, the owner of Pete's usual club.
- Aparna Nancherla as Anaya, a fellow comedian trying to break out
- Jermaine Fowler as Russell, a fellow comedian trying to break out
- Henry Zebrowski as Porter, a fellow comedian trying to break out
- Zach Cherry as Kevin, the manager at The Grisly Pear and later Pete's representative
- T. J. Miller as himself (Season 1)
- Audrie J. Neenan as Rita Holmes, Pete's mother (Seasons 1, 3)
- Fred Applegate as Pete's Dad (Seasons 1, 3)
- Jamie Lee as Ali Reissen, a comedian and Pete's first girlfriend after his divorce (Seasons 2–3)
- Madeline Wise as Kat (Season 3)

=== Guest stars ===
Season 1

- Episode 1: Jeff Ross, Rachel Feinstein, Gina Yashere, Keith Robinson, Dante Nero, Dan Naturman, and "Big Jay" Oakerson as Village Underground Host, Todd Montesi, Greer Barnes
- Episode 2: Gina Gershon, T.J. Miller
- Episode 4: Hannibal Buress, Marina Franklin
- Episode 6: Ashlie Atkinson as Schmitty, Sarah Silverman, Rachael Ray and husband John Cusimano, Ron Funches, Allan Havey, David Juskow, Steve Agee, Geno Bisconte
- Episode 7: Dave Attell, Vanessa Bayer
- Episode 8: Jim Norton

Season 2

- Episode 1: Penn Jillette, Dave Attell, Greer Barnes, Doug Benson, Gilbert Gottfried, Big Jay Oakerson
- Episode 2: Dr. Oz, Wale
- Episode 3: Bill Burr, Joy Behar
- Episode 4: Whitney Cummings, Emma Willmann, Mo Amer
- Episode 5: The Lucas Brothers, John Mulaney, Joe Machi
- Episode 6: Robert Kelly, Wayne Federman, Jessica Kirson, Greer Barnes, Greg Fitzsimmons
- Episode 7: Melissa Villaseñor
- Episode 8: Jeff Ross, Mike Lawrence, Tony Hinchcliffe

Season 3

- Episode 1: Jaboukie Young-White
- Episode 2: Elon Gold, Modi Rosenfeld
- Episode 3: Ray Romano, Dave Attell, Dan Naturman, Mike Lawrence, Joyelle Johnson
- Episode 4: Barrett Wilbert Weed
- Episode 6: Seth Meyers, Colin Quinn, Emo Philips, Wayne Federman
- Episode 7: Eve Plumb, Amy Schumer
- Episode 8: John Mulaney, Chris Gethard, Greer Barnes

== Production ==
=== Development and pilot ===
In 2015, Pete Holmes finished writing a pilot episode for a new comedy series partly based on his experiences as an emerging stand-up comic. The episode was directed by Judd Apatow who also served as executive producer along with Holmes and Dave Rath, Holmes' manager. It marked Apatow's first venture as the director of a pilot. The two first met in 2012 when Apatow was a guest on Holmes's podcast, You Made It Weird. A former stand-up comic for seven years, Apatow was inspired to return to it after hearing Amy Schumer tell stories while touring and by Holmes's enthusiasm toward the profession.

The idea for Crashing originated from a sketch that Holmes and Apatow filmed for the February 24, 2014, episode of Holmes's late night talk show The Pete Holmes Show on the TBS network. In the sketch, Holmes pitches increasingly terrible ideas for a film except one, based on Holmes's own life, involving a religious man whose wife cheats on him after six years of marriage. Apatow responds: "That doesn't seem like a comedy at all. That just seems tragic and sad".

Holmes did not see the potential of his life experiences as a premise for a show until his friend, actor Brian Sacca, suggesting adapting it as a one-person show for Holmes to play. After The Pete Holmes Show ended in June 2014, Holmes realized he "needed something new to do, so I took a quiet moment to think, what is it exactly I want to do? What's the story I want to tell?"

After an "unproductive" meeting with executives at Comedy Central about a new sketch comedy show, he began to develop the premise of Crashing in his head. Two days later, he flew to New York City for a day to pitch it to Apatow. He used a break in Apatow's filming of Trainwreck (2015). Apatow, who had returned to stand-up at clubs in the city, expressed interest in the concept. He asked Holmes to write ten pages about some of his life events. Holmes e-mailed Apatow a document "filled with truly embarrassing admissions and sad things". The two worked on the pilot from then on.

In September 2015, after they pitched the pilot to several television networks, HBO executive vice president of HBO programming, Amy Gravitt, gave the green-light to have it filmed. Gravitt commented: "I think for a comedy to define itself now it must have a clear point of view tonally as it relates to the story [its creator] want to tell. Having somebody like Pete helps the tone stay intact and not get diluted in the process". She also said that having Apatow "integrally involved" with the project is "incredibly important".

Filming for the pilot began in November 2015 and featured comedian and actor Artie Lange playing a scripted version of himself. His name became the title of the episode. Lange's audition was initially for a fictional and "totally different character" who "just had two lines" in the entire episode. He agreed to the audition, nonetheless, the first of which took place with Holmes, followed by the two of them with Apatow. "I had looked at the script, and Judd encourages improvising, so I just kind of got an outline in my head of what they wanted to do". Apatow told Lange to "forget the script". He used stories from Lange's first book, Too Fat to Fish (2008), to direct the dialogue in the audition, resulting in Lange's improvising about himself, which he said "was just the easiest experience". After working the writers worked on this for a week, "the character had become Artie Lange". In an interview conducted after the first day of filming, Lange said the shoot lasted for almost fourteen hours.

The pilot was a success, and HBO ordered a pickup to the first season in January 2016, initially for an undisclosed number of episodes and without a premiere airdate. The following month, Holmes revealed the first season includes eight episodes either written or co-written by him. Lange acknowledged he received a salary of $15,000 per episode in which he was featured in season one.

=== Writing ===
When Holmes began to prepare a script for Apatow, he saw it as a good opportunity to try and impress him with his work "instead of as an exercise", which he felt improved the script as a result. Holmes clarified that the show is "loosely based" on his life for legal reasons, but is "inspired by my life", including the time when he contacted his friend and fellow comedian Nick Kroll after his ex-wife cheated on him as he had nowhere to stay. Holmes cites friend T. J. Miller as another source for support at the time. After Apatow went over a script, he would send it back to Holmes with notes. Holmes said Apatow had a good sense of what "was the story and what wasn't", pointing out what scenes worked and others that were not necessary. In one instance, in a scene where Holmes had two characters conversing, Apatow suggested that something should also be happening.

Holmes and Apatow discussed who should be cast; Holmes credited Apatow for his "brilliant stroke of casting" for the series, pointing out Lange, Gina Gershon and Lauren Lapkus "was all Judd". The two agreed Lange was an important cast member to kick off the series, as Lange had the ability to "grab" the audience while being a suitable contrast to Pete's naive and inexperienced character. Apatow went to note Pete "naturally falls into an emotional and funny comedic rhythm with whoever the person is whose couch he's sleeping on". In the series, the man Jess cheats with is depicted as a hippie yet Holmes explained that in reality, "it was a small Italian man named Rocco". In episode two, titled "The Road", Lange revealed that Holmes' character is based on a personal assistant that Lange once hired to keep him off drugs in exchange for being the opening act. Gershon plays the girl who tried to offer Lange drugs that night. Holmes said Gershon did not have a formal audition for the role; "Judd was just like: It should be Gina".

Holmes' argument with a stripper was based on criticism he received regarding his dislike for strip clubs, which led to that idea being written into the script. Holmes pointed out the idea of Lange being the uncomfortable one at the baptism and Holmes more in his element, when in previous episodes the opposite was depicted.

=== Filming ===
Filming took place in various locations in mid-2016, including New York City, New Jersey, and Westchester, New York. To prepare himself, Holmes attended real open-mic nights at comedy venues to observe younger comedians at work. The scene with Holmes and Lange in the pizza shop was initially scripted, but Apatow abandoned it for an improvised scene with Lange giving Holmes advice for a new comedian starting in the stand-up business. Holmes picked the scene as the one that clinched the series to HBO and the overall success of the first season. For the scenes filmed at the various comedy venues, Apatow made Holmes perform material from his early stand-up career "four or five times" to the crowd of extras so they would get used to hearing it, thus giving off the impression that Pete is bombing on stage.

The first and second episodes feature scenes shot in Lange's real-life apartment in Hoboken, New Jersey. The sixth episode involves Holmes as a guest on Lange's podcast titled The Artie Quitter Podcast, recorded in his kitchen. Holmes was a guest on Lange's podcast in November 2015. On June 13, Lange detailed in a tweet that the first week of shooting had taken place. On June 19, he issued another tweet revealing the second episode had been shot, and noted filming for the first season was due to finish a week later. "The Baptism", the finale of the first season, contains scenes filmed at the Sands Point Preserve in Sands Point, New York on Long Island, on June 27.

=== Season two ===
On March 15, 2017, after four episodes had aired, Gravitt gave the green-light to a second season, citing the show's positive critical response. The number of episodes ordered at the time was unknown. As season one had an open-ended conclusion, Holmes said that Pete "learned to accept his divorce, but he's still broke". One aspect that Holmes wished to bring into the second season was the idea of success, as to him, people enjoyed the show when Pete is "floundering and when something goes right". Holmes said season two would concentrate on Pete accepting what has happened and shows the character embracing his new life.

Pete meets a new friend, Ali Reissen (portrayed by Jamie Lee), a romantic interest whose comedic advice to Holmes is based on a combination of people who gave Holmes advice in real life, including Gaffigan, Demetri Martin and Bill Burr, who introduces Pete to alternative comedy. Holmes credits Apatow in bringing back Lapkus, Basil, and Attell for season two due to their favourable reception from viewers. Writing began in April 2017 in Los Angeles, followed by filming which took place in August in New York City. Comedian and writer Greg Fitzsimmons was hired as a writer for season two, and spoke of working on the set by the director's chair for sessions that lasted for up to 14 hours in venues such as the Comedy Cellar and The Village Underground. Fitzsimmons recalled disruption in filming on the street at night from tourists and locals after they noticed a film shoot was taking place.

On March 17, 2017, news of Lange's arrest for cocaine and heroin possession was made public. Apatow maintained his support for Lange, tweeting "We would never give up on Artie or anyone struggling with addiction." On March 23, Lange claimed during an interview that he was fired from the show in the wake of the incident, but in a tweet Apatow maintained this was not the case. The following day, Lange said he is "still a Crashing employee". When asked if Lange would be on season two, Holmes said: "I would absolutely say so ... having it my way, and I know Judd loves Artie too, of course he would be in."

Lange revealed his salary of $17,500 per each season two episode featuring him.

== Episodes ==
Season	Episodes	Originally released	
Season	Episodes	First released	Last released
1	8	February 19, 2017	April 9, 2017
2	8	January 14, 2018	March 4, 2018
3	8	January 20, 2019	March 10, 2019

=== Season 1 (2017) ===
No. overall	No. in season	Title	Directed by	Written by	Original release date	U.S. viewers (millions)
1	1	"Artie Lange"	Judd Apatow	Pete Holmes	February 19, 2017	0.540
Pete catches his wife, Jessica, cheating on him with a man named Leif, and moves out without a place to stay. After a shaky performance at an open mic, Pete meets Artie Lange and spends the night on his couch.
2	2	"The Road"	Chris Kelly	Pete Holmes & Oren Brimer	February 24, 2017 (online); February 26, 2017 (HBO)	0.203
Pete drives Artie to Albany, where he lets Pete open up for himself and T.J. Miller. Pete tries to keep Artie sober and goes home with a fan of Artie's (Gina Gershon). Pete returns to the comedy club where Artie left but T.J. offers Pete a place to stay if he can drive them back to Manhattan.
3	3	"Yard Sale"	Chris Kelly	Judd Apatow & Pete Holmes	March 5, 2017	0.412
Pete and T.J. head upstate where Jessica is selling all of their possessions at a yard sale. Leif helps Pete reclaim his comedy journals. Jessica admits to Pete that she fell out of love with him as T.J. starts lighting the yard sale on fire, and T.J. implores Pete to do more open mics.
4	4	"Barking"	Jeff Schaffer	Eric Slovin & Pete Holmes	March 12, 2017	0.444
Pete hands out flyers for a comedy club but has trouble asserting himself to people on the street and a fellow comedian who takes his corner. After unsuccessfully finding enough people to pay to see him, Pete goes on last after the promoter, Jason, and a group of businessmen who Pete helped with directions earlier come and cheer on his performance after most people left the club.
5	5	"Parents"	Jeff Schaffer	Pete Holmes & Judah Miller	March 19, 2017	0.321
Pete asks Jessica to have dinner with his parents and act like they're still married; The attempt goes awry after Pete's mother, Rita, needles Jessica endlessly during the dinner. Jessica later tells Pete that he is too close with his mother but won't tell her the truth. Pete's parents later watch him perform at a club. Pete later thanks Jessica for pushing him out of his comfort zone even if he didn't accept it.
6	6	"Warm-up"	Ryan McFaul	Pete Holmes & Beth Stelling	March 26, 2017	0.451
Pete meets Sarah Silverman when he is invited on Artie's podcast, and she gets him a gig backing up the warm-up comedian for Rachael Ray. Pete ends up replacing the comedian and does a great job, earning a regular gig on the show. Sarah later buys Pete a hotel room for the night, giving him his own bed for the first time.
7	7	"Julie"	Ryan McFaul	Judd Apatow & Patrick Walsh & Pete Holmes	April 2, 2017	0.473
Leif's wife, Julie, reaches out to Pete to let him know about the affair but he feigns ignorance. Pete loses his gig after making inappropriate jokes about Rachael Ray's mom.
8	8	"The Baptism"	Judd Apatow	Judd Apatow & Pete Holmes	April 9, 2017	0.445
Artie accompanies Pete to a baptism, where Pete runs into Jessica after she and Leif have broken up. Jessica impulsively decides to get baptized after a confrontation with Leif. Pete and Leif impulsively declare their love for Jessica, who rejects them both. A dejected Pete, now broke, is forced to split a hotel room with Leif.

=== Season 2 (2018) ===
No. overall	No. in season	Title	Directed by	Written by	Original release date	U.S. viewers (millions)
9	1	"The Atheist"	Ryan McFaul	Pete Holmes & Judd Apatow	January 14, 2018	0.453
Pete is now living in Leif's garage and working at Cold Stone Creamery. Pete meets Ali, an up and coming comedian who doesn't like his usual club. Pete's faith in Christianity is shaken by Penn Jillette, and he later joins Artie, Big Jay Oakerson, Dave Attell, and Rachel Feinstein at a birthday party. A drunken Pete runs into Ali at a late-night show and goes home with her.
10	2	"Pete and Leif"	Ryan McFaul	Pete Holmes & Judd Apatow	January 21, 2018	0.401
Pete overstays his welcome at Ali's and she kicks him out, leaving him confused. A stressed Pete spends the day relaxing with Leif before he is called to be a warm-up comic for The Dr. Oz Show. Pete loses his wedding ring when he leaves it in Leif's bag. The bag is left in a park, and police blow it up mistaking it for a bomb.
11	3	"Bill Burr"	Ryan McFaul	Pete Holmes & Greg Fitzsimmons	January 28, 2018	0.291
Bill Burr is forced to let Pete crash in his guest room after Artie abandons him. Friendship-starved, new dad Bill befriends Pete and tries to toughen him up. However, Pete jeopardizes their friendship when he films Bill testing out politically incorrect material and posts it on Instagram. Pete confesses what he did to Bill, who forgives him but kicks him out in hopes that he will grow and confront Leif about the affair. Pete attempts to confront Leif but ends up treating him nicely and crashing in his garage.
12	4	"Porter Got HBO"	Ryan McFaul	Judah Miller	February 2, 2018 (online); February 4, 2018 (HBO)	0.174
Pete reconnects with Jessica, who is sleeping with Leif again. Pete struggles to support his comedian friend who got a spot in a Whitney Cummings-hosted HBO stand-up show, since the friend is considered the worst of the group.
13	5	"Too Good"	Jude Weng	Pete Holmes & Beth Stelling	February 11, 2018	0.394
Ali shows Pete around the New York alternative comedy scene, culminating in an uncomfortable encounter with John Mulaney. Pete makes a mistake when trying to film Ali's set but is able to make up for it and they hook up afterwards.
14	6	"Artie"	Gillian Robespierre	Pete Holmes & Judd Apatow	February 18, 2018	0.335
Pete organizes a benefit for a cancer-addled Wayne Federman with Artie as the headliner. The unreliable Artie returns to drugs and misses the show, embarrassing Pete. Artie tells Pete off after Pete confronts him but later does a set at the club, and Pete returns to church.
15	7	"NACA"	Oren Brimer	Pete Holmes	February 25, 2018	0.431
Pete, Ali, Kevin, and Melissa Villaseñor head down to a National Association for Campus Activities event in Philadelphia. Pete's clean, college-safe act gets a warm reception but Ali pushes boundaries and does not receive nearly as much attention. Ali blows up at Pete and says she does not want to be the kind of comic who does safe material. Melissa helps make Ali feel better and the four drive home.
16	8	"Roast Battle"	Gillian Robespierre	Pete Holmes & Judd Apatow	March 4, 2018	0.344
Pete and Ali participate in Jeff Ross Presents Roast Battle where a reluctant Pete defeats Ali in the second round. Pete is offended that Ali brought up his personal business on stage and the two break up. Pete performs on the college circuit for the first time.

=== Season 3 (2019) ===
No. overall	No. in season	Title	Directed by	Written by	Original release date	U.S. viewers (millions)
17	1	"Jaboukie"	Ryan McFaul	Judd Apatow & Pete Holmes	January 20, 2019	0.301
Pete mentors a young comedian, Jaboukie (Jaboukie Young-White) and finishes his college tour. Pete and Jaboukie head back to New York where both have auditions at The Comedy Cellar. Jaboukie nails the audition but Pete doesn't stand out, leading Pete to realize that Jaboukie doesn't need him and Pete has a lot more work to do.
18	2	"The Temple Gig"	Ryan McFaul	Judah Miller & Pete Holmes & Yoni Weinberg	January 27, 2019	0.423
Pete meets and spends the day with Kat, a woman who likes Pete's comedy. The two have sex in multiple dressing rooms. Pete does a set at a synagogue with Elon Gold and Modi Rosenfeld. Gold later arranges for Pete to sit down with the Rabbi, but Pete opts to go with Kat again.
19	3	"The Secret"	Gillian Robespierre	Pete Holmes	February 1, 2019 (online); February 3, 2019 (HBO)	0.341
Pete dives headfirst into his relationship with Kat, and she forces him out of his comfort zone by forcing him to return to The Comedy Cellar.
20	4	"MC, Middle, Headliner"	Oren Brimer	Dave King & Mike Lawrence & Pete Holmes	February 10, 2019	0.338
Pete, Ali, and Jason do shows at a club in New Jersey, where Jason's macho attitude and set causes trouble. Ali opens, Pete does the middle, and Jason is the headliner. Jason is demoted for Pete while the club manager tells Ali to smile more. Ali takes out her rage on Jason's act, and he responds with an even worse set. Jason hits on the server, who rejects him and reacts violently. Pete, sick of Jason, begins a new job on the Christian comedy circuit.
21	5	"Mom and Kat"	Gillian Robespierre	Judd Apatow & Pete Holmes	February 17, 2019	0.387
Pete brings Kat back to Massachusetts for a performance, where her unorthodox spirituality is at odds with his mom's piety. Pete's mom confronts Kat about not wearing a bra at Pete's performance, but Pete defends her. Pete's mom later overhears the two having sex in his childhood bedroom and teases him about it in the morning.
22	6	"The Viewing Party"	Judd Apatow	Jamie Lee & Pete Holmes	February 24, 2019	0.321
Pete and Kat attend a watch party at The Comedy Cellar for Ali's appearance on Late Night with Seth Meyers. The party is interrupted as people leave to watch a surprise set by Emo Philips, who gives Ali some much-needed advice. Kat, drunk and jealous, confronts Ali about a joke she made, spooking both Ali and Jessica. Kat consequently accuses Pete of cheating on her with Ali.
23	7	"The Christian Tour"	Gillian Robespierre	Greg Fitzsimmons & Pete Holmes	March 3, 2019	0.470
Pete starts his Christian tour and runs into New York comic Jessica Kirson on the road and they hang out, where Pete expresses his fear of being judged for being a Christian comedian. Jessica tells him to just do the material he wants to do. He does, and gets himself fired for pushing boundaries. After, he returns to New York and has an acrimonious breakup with Kat.
24	8	"Mulaney"	Gillian Robespierre	Judd Apatow & Judah Miller	March 10, 2019	0.429
Pete is tabbed to open for John Mulaney at The Town Hall, but quickly discovers Mulaney wanted "Ben Holmes" and not Pete. Pete still opens the show after nobody can find a replacement, much to Mulaney's chagrin. Pete's jokes about how rude Mulaney was to him get uproarious laughter, earning his respect, and the two go to dinner at The Comedy Cellar afterwards. Mulaney persuades the manager to let Pete do a set at the club, which also goes well and the manager lets him be a regular performer. Pete gets back together with Ali afterwards.

== Reception ==
Crashing has received mostly positive reviews from critics. On Rotten Tomatoes, the first season holds an approval rating of 90%, based on 39 reviews, with an average rating of 7.30/10. The site's critical consensus reads, "The refreshingly goofy Crashing embraces a measured positivity and an overall sweetness that sets it apart from its more sardonic contemporaries." On Metacritic, the first season holds an approval rating of 73 out of 100, based on 22 critics, indicating "generally favorable reviews".

Caroline Framke gave the series four stars out of five in a review for Vox, writing: "If you're anything like me when I got the assignment to review Crashing, you might be thinking to yourself ... "do we really need another comedy about comedy?” ... But Crashing makes a solid case for itself anyway by leaning into two distinctive features that set it apart", namely Holmes' charm and that the show "is really good at telling really bad jokes," which stops it from becoming "stale."
