= Crash and Burn =

Crash and Burn may refer to:

== TV and film ==
- Crash 'n' Burn (1977 film), about Toronto, Canada's first punk club
- Crash and Burn (documentary), a 2016 documentary about motor racing driver Tommy Byrne
- Crash and Burn (1990 film), a 1990 low budget sci-fi movie
- Crash and Burn (2008 film), a crime thriller
- Crash and Burn, part four of RoboCop: Prime Directives, a 2001 miniseries based on the RoboCop film series
- Crash & Burn (TV series), a Canadian television series
- "Crash and Burn" (CSI episode)
- "Crash and Burn" (Entourage), a television episode
- "Crash and Burn" (Highway Thru Hell), a 2025 television episode
- "Crash and Burn", an episode of the Indian TV series Bujji and Bhairava
- CrashBurn (2003), Australian TV miniseries

== Music ==
=== Albums ===
- Crash and Burn (John Foxx and Louis Gordon album), 2003
- Crash and Burn (Pat Travers Band album), 1980
- Crash & Burn (Traci Braxton album), 2014
- Crash and Burn, by Bombay Rockers, 2007

=== Songs ===
- "Crash and Burn" (Nadia Ali song), 2008
- "Crash and Burn" (Savage Garden song), 1999
- "Crash and Burn" (Thomas Rhett song), 2015
- "Crash & Burn" (Basshunter song), 2013
- "Crash and Burn", from the April Wine album The Nature of the Beast, 1981
- "Crash and Burn", from the Bangles album Everything, 1988
- "Crash and Burn", from the Bea Miller album Aurora, 2018
- "Crash and Burn", from the Bif Naked album The Promise, 2009
- "Crash and Burn", original title of "You Said No", by Busted, 2003
- "Crash and Burn", by Jan Leyers, 2003
- "Crash and Burn", from the Lifehouse album Smoke & Mirrors, 2010
- "Crash and Burn", by Maggie Lindemann, 2021
- "Crash & Burn", from the Pink album I'm Not Dead, 2006
- "Crash and Burn", from the Sheryl Crow album The Globe Sessions, 1998
- "Crash and Burn", from the Simple Plan video album A Big Package for You, 2003
- "Crash & Burn", from the Sugababes album Sweet 7, 2010
- "Crash and Burn", from the Yngwie J. Malmsteen album The Seventh Sign, 1984

== Other uses ==
- Crash N Burn (1993 video game), for 3DO
- Crash 'n' Burn (2004 video game), for Xbox and PlayStation 2
- Crash and Burn (book), a memoir by American comedian Artie Lange

== See also ==
- Crash & Bernstein, a Disney XD comedy
- "Crash and Burn Girl", a 2005 song by Robyn
