= Greer Barnes =

American stand-up comedian and actor

Greer Barnes (born 1964) is an American stand-up comedian and actor. He is known for clever wordplay, observational humor, sketch comedy, mimicry, and energetic physical comedy. He has performed in comedy festivals, in commercials, on television and in films. He regularly appears at The Comedy Cellar in New York City’s West Village.

== Biography ==
Barnes was born in the South Bronx and grew up on Manhattan's West Side. He has a Jewish stepfather and was bar mitzvahed at thirteen. He was a star athlete in high school, especially in baseball. At 19, he was invited to try out with the San Francisco Giants, but was unable to afford to make the trip. He went into stand-up comedy and was soon well known in the New York scene. His comic idols are the late Richard Pryor and Eddie Murphy. He has appeared at Catch a Rising Star, Comic Strip Live, The Comedy Cellar, and Carolines on Broadway. In 2014, he released his debut comedy album See What I'm Saying.

He has performed at the Aspen, Montreal, Melbourne, and Edinburgh Comedy Festivals. Dave Chappelle has taken Barnes along as his opening act on international tours. Greer performed at Madison Square Garden numerous times while opening for Louis CK.

Barnes has appeared frequently on TV. He appeared on Late Night with David Letterman in July 1995 and on Late Night with Stephen Colbert in 2017. He has been seen on MTV, BET, HBO, and most other major networks. In February 2009, he wrote and starred in a half-hour special on Comedy Central Presents.

== Filmography ==
- 1999 For Love of the Game
- 2014 Top Five
- 2016 The Comedian
- 2019 Joker
- 2022 The Life of Peter Gottlieb
- 2023 Ezra

== Television ==
- Late Show with David Letterman
- Chappelle's Show
- In Living Color
- Late Show with Stephen Colbert
- Def Comedy Jam
- Comedy Central Presents
- Last Call with Carson Daly
- Comedy Central's Premium Blend
- The Jim Gaffigan Show
- Red Oaks
- Kevin Can Wait
- Crashing
- Flatbush Misdemeanors

== Web series ==
- Horace and Pete
