= I Am the New Black =

- Author: Tracy Morgan with Anthony Bozza
- Genre: Autobiography
- Published: 2009 (Spiegel & Grau)
- Publication place: United States
- Media type: Print
- ISBN: 978-1-58836-941-3

I Am the New Black is a 2009 autobiography by American actor and comedian Tracy Morgan, co-written with journalist Anthony Bozza. It was published on 22 October 2009 by Spiegel & Grau.

The book includes tales about Morgan's life as a child, living in Tompkins Projects in Brooklyn, the desperation of the drug dealers' trade and how he rose to fame performing on Saturday Night Live.
