= Slash (autobiography) =

2007 autobiography by Slash with Anthony Bozza

- Author: Slash with Anthony Bozza
- Language: English
- Genre: Autobiography
- Publisher: HarperCollins Entertainment (UK) HarperEntertainment (USA)
- Publication date: October 29, 2007 (UK) October 30, 2007 (USA)
- Publication place: United States
- Media type: Print (Hardback)
- Pages: 480
- ISBN: 978-0-00-725775-1 (UK) ISBN 978-0-06-135142-6 (USA)
- OCLC: 271423201

Slash: The Autobiography of Slash is an autobiography written by rock guitarist Slash with Anthony Bozza. The book's tagline is: "It seems excessive, but that doesn't mean it didn't happen..."

== Content ==
Slash's autobiography tells his story of playing in bands around early 1980s Los Angeles, eventually leading to the formation of Guns N' Roses, who would go on to become one of the biggest bands on the planet in the early 90s, before collapsing under their own weight. Slash talks about Axl Rose, frontman of Guns N' Roses, and his departure from the band in the mid-1990s. He states that Axl's inability to show up to gigs and rehearsals on time, in addition to Axl's almost dictator-like control of the band contributed to the band's downfall. Slash also states that Axl wanted to change the musical direction of the band to include more synthesizers and effects, rather than guitar-driven rock as with their earlier material.

Slash also explains how he dealt with and overcame the harsh chains of addiction, and his many close calls with death because of heroin, cocaine, pills, alcohol, and more. He had a very bad addiction to a variety of different drugs, but was in time, able to overcome and get his life back on track. Slash relates how he eventually achieved stability and sobriety after his second marriage and the birth of two sons.

== Reception ==
The book reached No. 6 on the New York Times Hardcover Nonfiction list no November 25, 2007, having been published in the United States on October 30. Slash retells some of the events from that book from his own perspective in the autobiography.
