= Bob Levy (comedian) =

American stand-up comedian, radio personality, and podcaster

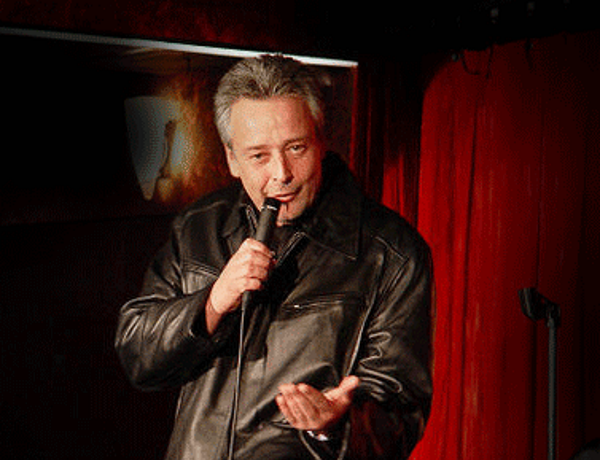
- Levy performing in 2012
- Born: August 12, 1962 (age 64); Brooklyn, New York City, U.S.
- Other name: "The Reverend"
- Notable work: The Howard Stern Show; The Killers of Comedy Tour; Misery Loves Company with Kevin Brennan

Comedy career
- Medium: Comedy; Television; Podcast; Talk radio
- Genres: Observational comedy Insult comedy Sex comedy Cringe comedy Shock humour
- Subjects: Modern society; Sex; American politics

Bob Levy (born August 12, 1962) is an American stand-up comedian, podcaster, and former radio personality. He is the host of The Bob Levy Show, Levyland, the Out of the Coffin podcast, and is best known for his regular appearances on The Howard Stern Show.

Levy became closely associated with the Stern show during the 2000s through on-air contests, comedy roasts, live touring, and his run as a co-host of the Howard 101 program Miserable Men. In the 2010s and 2020s, his work shifted increasingly toward podcasting and livestreaming, including The Bob Levy Show, Levyland, Out of the Coffin, regular appearances on Kevin Brennan's Misery Loves Company, and work with The Shuli Network.

== Early life ==
Levy was born in Brooklyn, New York and moved to Staten Island at age six. While his father was of part-Jewish heritage, Levy was raised a Lutheran by his mother. He dropped out of high school after six years and worked several jobs, including landscaping and painting. For a brief period, he was a professional wrestler under the ring name "Heartbreaker" Bobby Slayer.

== Career ==
=== Early career (1990–2001) ===
Levy wasn't a fan of comedy until he started listening to The Howard Stern Show in 1990, for which he started to send jokes and song parodies that he had written. Levy then started to attend open mic nights hosted by the show's writer, Jackie Martling. Levy recalled that he was unpaid for the first year of doing stand-up. Later on, Martling gave Levy the nickname "The Reverend"; Levy recalled: "Because I was a filthy fuckin' pig, and he wanted to call me the opposite of what I was doing onstage".

By 2001, Levy had appeared on Comedy's Dirtiest Dozen, performed at Woodstock '94, and had opened for the Edgar Winter Group and Bachman Turner Overdrive.

By the early 2000s, regional press coverage had identified Levy with a deliberately raunchy, insult-heavy stage persona, the style that later became central to his radio and touring work. Contemporary coverage also identified him with a recurring stage bit in which he ate blue cheese from a female audience member's buttocks.

=== The Howard Stern Show (2002–2010) ===
In 2002, Levy entered himself in the World's Meanest Listener contest held on The Howard Stern Show which increased his profile. He submitted clips of himself roasting Stern and the staff which were well received and made him a top three finalist. In 2004, he was one of the contestants on "Get John's Job" contest. He was one of the hosts of The Killers of Comedy Tour, a comedy tour featuring several of the show's guests and staffers, which included Jim Florentine, Beetlejuice, and The Iron Sheik. When the show moved to SiriusXM in 2006, Levy was the host of the show's series of live comedy roasts. In a 2008 interview with the Houston Press, Levy said he and Stern producer Gary Dell'Abate assembled the roast lineups by choosing comedians suited to each subject and trying to avoid overlap in material.

From 2006 to 2010, Levy was co-host of the weekly comedy show Miserable Men on Howard 101 on SiriusXM Radio.

In December 2007, Levy opened Levy's Comedy Club at the Ramada Inn in Levittown, Pennsylvania.

In 2008, Levy took part in a boxing match with Danny Bonaduce, losing to Bonaduce by a TKO in the second one-minute round of a planned three-round fight.

Levy also maintained a long-running professional association with fellow Stern comedian Artie Lange. Their overlap included the 2006 Roast of Mr. Artie Lange, the 2008 audiobook edition of Lange's memoir Too Fat to Fish, and later shared stand-up bills, including a 2016 date in Scranton and a 2018 benefit for Levy at the Stress Factory in New Brunswick.

In a June 2010 interview with MarksFriggin, Levy said he had left Miserable Men after disputes over on-air plugs, guest bookings, and compensation, and that he had subsequently been banned from the Stern channels.

=== Post Howard Stern Show (2011–2014) ===
Following his departure from Miserable Men, MarksFriggin reported that Levy had begun hosting an online show titled Levyland on Stickam.

In 2014, Levy was the host of Ears Wide Open with co-hosts Stacey Prussman and Joe Conte. It aired on WILC-AM in Washington, D.C. and WUFC-AM in Boston.

During this period, Levy's work increasingly moved away from traditional terrestrial and satellite radio toward downloadable shows and online distribution.

=== The Bob Levy Show (2015–present) ===
Levy started the comedic podcast titled The Bob Levy Show in September 2015. The show moved to the Radio Misfits Podcast Network in October 2015.

Radio Misfits materials described the show as part of Levy's transition into independent podcasting, with episodes featuring Levy alongside recurring collaborators including John Kensil and Joe Conte.

=== The Uncle Rico Show (2022–2024) ===
Beginning in 2022, Levy was part of The Shuli Network's The Uncle Rico Show, a program centered on reacting to and parodying former Stern personality Stuttering John Melendez. Melendez first became known on Stern as a call screener and celebrity interviewer, and later worked as announcer and a writer for The Tonight Show with Jay Leno. Network descriptions billed Levy, Shuli Egar and Mike Morse as central figures in the network's flagship Stern-adjacent programming.

Levy co-hosts The Uncle Rico Show with Shuli Egar, Mike Morse and Anthony "C.Piggy" Zenhouser. The show also features guest appearances by other comedians who are part of the DabbleVerse. Anthony Cumia, Chrissie Mayer and "Lady" Karl Heberger of WATP. The Uncle Rico Show is broadcast live on The Shuli Network and is streamed real-time to YouTube, Patreon and free-speech video hosting platforms Rumble and X/Twitter. In 2024, Levy left the Uncle Rico program.

=== Other ventures ===
Until 2008, Levy was a writer and regular on Kidd Chris's morning radio show on WYSP in Philadelphia. Strauss wrote in 2008 that Levy was balancing terrestrial radio, satellite radio, stand-up, writing, and club management at the same time; Levy told the paper that his work for the Kidd Chris show involved going through "200 to 300 pages a day of jokes and lines". Levy also opened a weekend comedy club in Levittown, Pennsylvania and three other comedy clubs in Easton, Florida.

Levy is the former host of Rising with "The Reverend" Bob Levy with co-hosts Will Bozarth and John Kensil, on WNJC-AM in Philadelphia.

In 2018, a benefit at the Stress Factory in New Brunswick was organized for Levy after injuries from a 2017 car crash limited his ability to work regularly.

Since November 2020, Levy has hosted the Levyland podcast.

In 2021, Levy started making regular appearances on fellow comedian Kevin Brennan's Misery Loves Company podcast.

In October 2022, Levy, along with Brennan, opened a comedy club called Brennan & Levy's Comedy Loft in Vineland, New Jersey.

Levy is co-host of The BS Show with Shuli Egar. The BS Show is a part of The Shuli Network. The Shuli Network currently provides original content, streamed to multiple video hosting platforms, including YouTube, Patreon and free-speech hosting platforms Rumble and X/Twitter.

Levy has also hosted Out of the Coffin, a recurring livestream and podcast distributed through Levyverse and related video platforms.

Over the course of the 2020s, Levy has made sporadic appearances on the internet livestream show Perry Caravello Live, hosted by actor, alleged snowboarder, and comedian Perry Caravello, the star of the Comedy Central prank movie Windy City Heat.

== Personal life ==
In 2007, LAist described Levy as living in the basement of his ex-wife's house. In February 2008, he appeared on The Howard Stern Show with his then-fiancée, Christine, in the program's "Nearly Wed" game, and an April 2008 Houston Press interview referred to her as a fan of the show.

Levy is married to Gina Levy since 2018 and resides in New Jersey.
