= Patricia Morrisroe =

American journalist (born 1951)

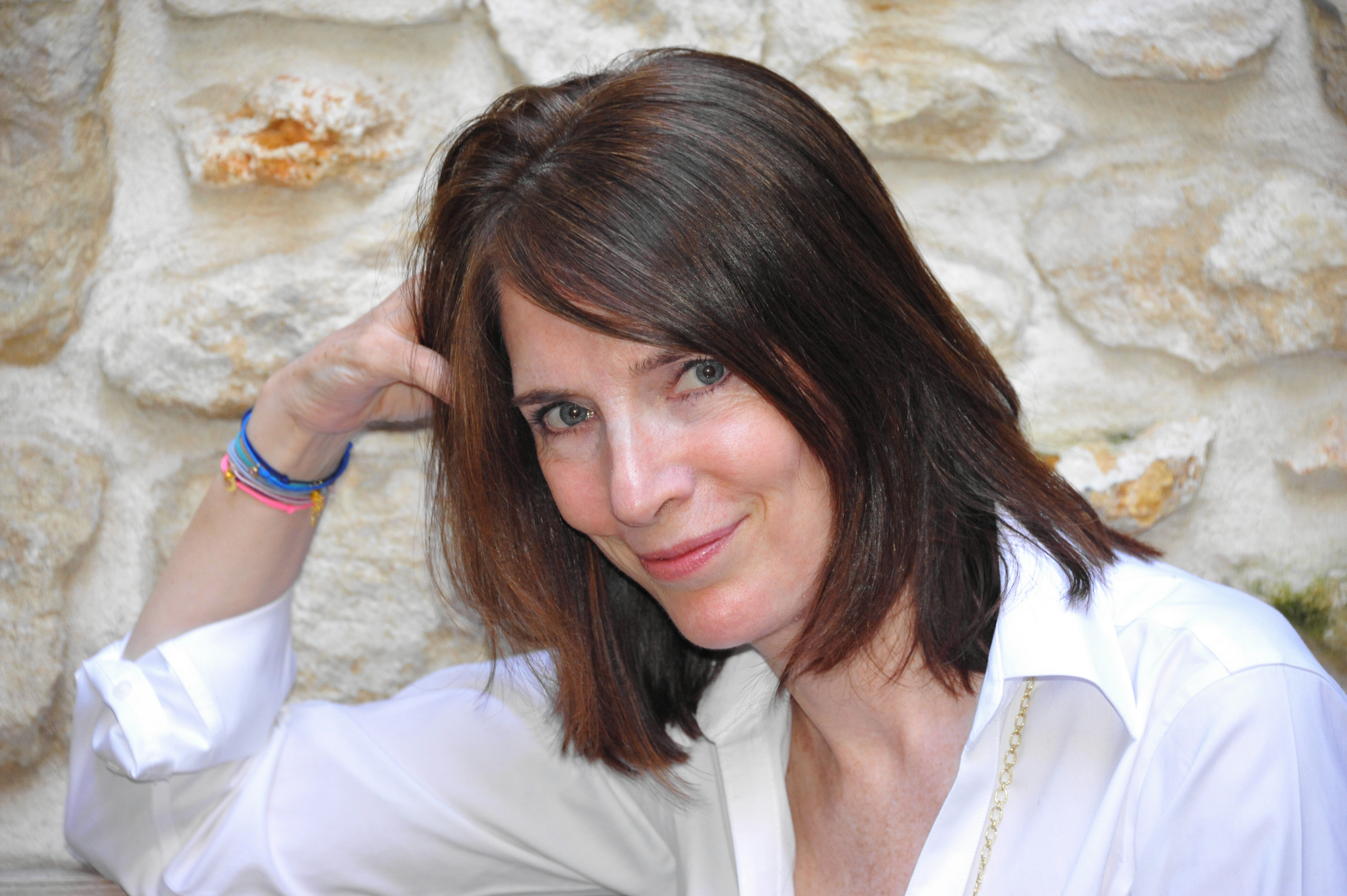
- Born: January 14, 1951 (age 75); Andover, Massachusetts
- Education: Tufts University; NYU
- Spouse: Lee D. Stern
- Writing career
- Language: English
- Notable works: Mapplethorpe: A Biography; Wide Awake: A Memoir of Insomnia; The Woman in the Moonlight

Patricia Morrisroe (born January 14, 1951) is an American journalist and author, best known for writing the biography of Robert Mapplethorpe. Her writing has appeared in The New York Times, Vogue, New York Magazine, and others.

== Early life and education ==
Patricia Morrisroe was born in Andover, Massachusetts. Her father, Lawrence P. Morrisroe, was a banker, and her mother was Eileen Flynn. She graduated from Tufts University, earning a B.A. in English.

She received an M.A. in Cinema Studies from New York University.

== Career ==
After graduating, Morrisroe worked for a year as a reporter and film critic at the Eagle-Tribune, a daily newspaper covering Massachusetts and New Hampshire. During the 1980s, she was a contributing editor at New York Magazine, writing over 50 features including several dozen cover stories. Among the most notable were "The Death and Life of Perry Ellis," about the fashion designer's secret battle with AIDS, and "Bess and the Mess," about the political misfortunes of former Miss America Bess Myerson.

Morrisroe has also written profiles for London's Sunday Times Magazine, including an interview with writer Raymond Carver which was included in the book Conversations With Raymond Carver. Her journalism and essays have been published in Vogue, Vanity Fair, the New York Times, Elle Décor, Departures, and Travel & Leisure. Her essay "Swept Away" was included in Nostalgia in Vogue, a 2011 compilation of coming-of-age essays from the Vogue Nostalgia column, alongside other contributions by Joan Didion, Karl Lagerfeld, Nora Ephron, Patti Smith, and others.

In 1988, photographer Robert Mapplethorpe selected Morrisroe to write his biography. She interviewed 300 people for the book and spent six months with Mapplethorpe before he died of HIV/AIDS. Mapplethorpe: A Biography was published by Random House in 1995. Foreign editions were published in the UK, Spain, Germany, The Netherlands, Japan, and Brazil. Art critic Arthur C. Danto, writing in The Nation, praised it as "utterly admirable ... The clarity and honesty of Morrisroe's portrait are worthy of its subject."

Morrisroe's other non-fiction books include Wide Awake: A Memoir of Insomnia (2010) and 9 1/2 Narrow: My Life in Shoes (2015). Her debut novel, The Woman in the Moonlight, was published in 2020. The book centers on the imagined relationship between Beethoven and Countess Julie Guicciardi, to whom Beethoven's Moonlight Sonata (Piano Sonata No. 14) was dedicated. As part of the 250th Anniversary of Beethoven's birth in 2020, Morrisroe wrote articles for the New York Times exploring lesser-known figures in the composer's life.

== Personal life ==
Morrisroe is married to Lee D. Stern. She lives in New York City and Westchester.

== Bibliography ==
=== Books ===
- Mapplethorpe: A Biography. Random House. 1995. ISBN 0306807661.
- Wide Awake: A Memoir of Insomnia. Spiegel & Grau. 2010. ISBN 9780385522243.
- 9 1/2 Narrow: My Life in Shoes. Penguin Random House. 2015. ISBN 9780399589447
- The Woman in the Moonlight: A Novel. Little A. 2020. ISBN 9781503903753.

=== Essays and Articles ===
- "Forever Single." New York Magazine. August 20, 1984.
- "The Punk Glamour God." New York Magazine. March 26, 2004.
- "Grandmother's Travel Memories." Travel + Leisure. April 1, 2009.
- "Another Voice Had Come Between Us" Modern Love. The New York Times. September 28, 2012.
- "Uniting a Mysterious Ring With Its Rightful Owner." Modern Love. The New York Times. July 23, 2015.
- “Château Dior.” Departures. September 12, 2016.
- "The Black Violinist Who Inspired Beethoven." The New York Times. September 4, 2020.
- “The Woman Who Built Beethoven’s Pianos.” The New York Times. November 6, 2020.
- “The Behind-the-Scenes Assist That Made Beethoven’s Ninth Happen.” The New York Times. December 8, 2020
- "5 Minutes That Will Make You Love Beethoven." The New York Times. December 20, 2020.
