= Liza Monroy =

American novelist

- Born: Liza Gennatiempo; November 12, 1979 (age 46) Seattle, Washington, U.S.
- Occupation: Novelist, memoirist, essayist, journalist, educator
- Education: Emerson College, Columbia University School of the Arts

Website
- www.lizamonroy.com

Liza Monroy (born November 12, 1979; née Liza Gennatiempo) is an American novelist, memoirist, essayist, and educator. Her debut novel, Mexican High (2008), was published by Spiegel and Grau. Her second novel, The Distractions (2025) was published in January 2025, following two memoirs, The Marriage Act and Seeing As Your Shoes Are Soon To Be On Fire.

== Early life and education ==
Liza Monroy was born in 1979 in Seattle, Washington. Her parents divorced when she was young. Her mother Peggy was American Jewish and had worked for the United States Department of State; and her father was Italian and had worked in the restaurant industry.

She has a BFA degree (2000) from Emerson College; and a MFA degree in non-fiction from Columbia University School of the Arts. She also served as an instructor in the undergraduate writing program at Columbia University School of the Arts.

== Career ==
Her debut novel Mexican High (2008) is fictional and features a main character named Mila Marquez but the story is loosely based on Monroy's own experiences of living in Mexico City in 1993 and attending an elite private high school.

Monroy released a memoir, The Marriage Act: The Risk I Took To Keep My Best Friend In America And What It Taught Us About Love (Soft Skull Press; 2014) about the three years she spent married to gay Middle Eastern man named Emir (from fictitiously entitled Emirstan) who might otherwise have been deported. The book The Marriage Act explores human relationships, and addresses the concepts of marriage and love.

Her articles and essays have appeared in The New York Times, The New York Times Magazine, the L.A. Times, Newsweek, Village Voice, Jane, Self, Bust, and others.

She has served as a member of the Writing faculty at the University of California Santa Cruz (UCSC), and in lives in Santa Cruz, California.

== Publications ==
- Monroy, Liza (2008). Mexican High. Spiegel & Grau. ISBN 9780385523592.
- Monroy, Liza (2010). Keeping you with me (dissertation). Columbia University. OCLC 793808365.
- Monroy, Liza (2014). The Marriage Act: The Risk I Took to Keep My Best Friend in America, and What It Taught Us About Love. Soft Skull Press. ISBN 9781593765361.
- Monroy, Liza (2016). Seeing As Your Shoes Are Soon to be on Fire: Essays. Soft Skull Press. ISBN 9781593766498.
