= Too Fat to Fish =

2008 memoir by Artie Lange

- Hardprint cover
- Author: Artie Lange; Anthony Bozza
- Language: English
- Subject: Personal memoirs
- Genre: Humor
- Publisher: Spiegel & Grau
- Publication date: November 11, 2008
- Publication place: United States
- Media type: Hardcover; Audiobook; Paperback
- Pages: 320
- ISBN: 978-0-385-52656-2
- LC Class: PN2287.L2833 A3 2008

Too Fat to Fish is a collection of memoirs by American comedian, radio personality and actor Artie Lange. Published by Spiegel & Grau on November 11, 2008, the book is co-written by journalist Anthony Bozza. Lange dedicated the book to radio personality Howard Stern, who also writes its foreword. It is said that Lange writes about his "most personal revelation" in the book.

Too Fat to Fish debuted at number one on The New York Times Best Seller list, holding the position for one week. A paperback edition was released on June 2, 2009, which included a bonus chapter and alternate back cover. In 2013, Lange released his second book, Crash and Burn.

== Pre-release ==
In June 2008, five months prior to the book's release, Too Fat to Fish hit the Amazon list at No. 27. Chapter eight of the book, "Pig in Shit", was made available for reading, including clips of the audio book from the book's website. On November 3, the Howard 100 News team reported that a billboard advertising Too Fat to Fish was put up at Broadway and 54th Street in New York City.

== Post-release ==
One day after the release of Too Fat to Fish, the book topped Amazon's "Hot New Releases" list. and reached No. 8 in its "Bestsellers in Books" lists.

Too Fat to Fish debuted at number one on The New York Times Best Seller list, holding the position for one week. The book remained on the list's top ten for 11 weeks, and inside the top 15 for fourteen weeks.

The book has received some media attention for its unusual, humorous title, based on something Lange's mother once said. It was notably referenced twice on the Top Ten List segment on the Late Show with David Letterman.

== Audiobook ==
The unabridged audio book was partly read by Lange himself (6 chapters), The Howard Stern Show producer Gary Dell'Abate, comedian "The Reverend" Bob Levy, and comedian Jim Florentine.

== Critical reception ==
Publishers Weekly called the book "scrappy, funny, tumultuous and profane, just like its author."
