= Sadamantium =

- Cover art by Matteo Lane

Live album by Mike Lawrence
- Released: May 28, 2013
- Recorded: March 9, 2013; Nerdist Showroom at Meltdown Comics.
- Genre: Comedy
- Length: 54:09
- Label: Comedy Central Records

Sadamantium is the debut album by comedian Mike Lawrence released digitally on May 28, 2013 by Comedy Central Records.

The name comes from a combination of the words "sad" and "adamantium", which is a fictitious indestructible metal alloy in the Marvel Comics Universe. On the cover of the album, Lawrence is portrayed in a comic-book style drawing with features associated with the Marvel Comics character Wolverine, including his signature hairstyle and adamantium claws.

== Track listing ==
No.	Title	Length
1.	"Gingerbeard Man"	2:12
2.	"Nerd Troubles"	5:29
3.	"British Stuff"	1:37
4.	"Fallen Heroes"	7:21
5.	"Dad Issues"	5:53
6.	"McDonald's"	7:10
7.	"Angel Mouth"	4:38
8.	"Only in New York"	5:57
9.	"Batman"	3:49
10.	"Bounce House"	1:12
11.	"All Caps"	4:29
12.	"What Are You Doing?"	4:22

== Reception ==
Sadamantium was met with positive reviews. Steve Heisler of The A.V. Club gave the article a B+ rating and stated that, "Mike Lawrence peruses pop culture the way a vegan peruses a fast-food menu: with vigilance bordering on insanity." Tony Bartolone of The Huffington Post stated, "Mike Lawrence is not just an immensely funny, hardworking, comedy revelation; he's a symbol of the changes we are going through in our modern society." In a review of Sadamantium, Angie Frissore of Under the Gun Review said about Lawrence that, "His uncensored and unique style establishes him as one of the freshest voices in today’s stand-up scene." She also said that, "Sadamantium is a refreshing and entertaining CD from start to finish." In a review of the album, Ben DiCostanzo of The Laugh Button said, "This debut album could not have gone better for Mike Lawrence. His first full hour is hilarious and Lawrence is most definitely on the rise in the comedy world."
