= Mike Bocchetti =

American stand-up comedian and actor

- Born: April 3, 1961 (age 65); Staten Island, New York
- Education: Tottenville High School
- Occupations: Stand-up comedian; actor; writer
- Notable work: The Artie Lange Show; The Howard Stern Show; Last Comic Standing; Opie and Anthony; Smiling Friends

Comedy career
- Years active: 1992–present
- Medium: Stand-up; Television; Acting; Film; Podcasting
- Genres: Observational comedy; Sketch comedy; One-liners; Self-deprecation

Mike Bocchetti (born April 3, 1961) is an American stand-up comedian, actor, and writer from Staten Island, New York. He is most notable for his role as the announcer on The Artie Lange Show from 2012 to 2014, and has acted frequently on film and television.

Bocchetti released a comedy album, Thank You, on Stand Up! Records in 2019.

== Early life ==
Bocchetti was born on April 3, 1961, in Staten Island to a Catholic Italian family of what he once called "a very humble blue-collar background". He is the oldest of five children. He graduated from Tottenville High School in 1979. Often bullied as a child for being overweight, he was inspired to become a comedian after hearing Redd Foxx and realizing that the audience was laughing with, and not at, Foxx.

He joined the Marines in 1980 but washed out after a few weeks; he wrote about the experience for his 2019 stage show Space Cookie.

== Career ==
=== Stand-up comedy/stage ===
Bocchetti started performing comedy in 1992 and has performed on New York-area stages for decades, including the Staten Island Comedy Festival and New Jersey music festival The Bamboozle.

=== Television ===
Bocchetti was the announcer on DirecTV's The Artie Lange Show (originally titled The Nick & Artie Show) from 2012 to 2014. He had been friends with Lange since the 1990s as a fellow stand-up comic; before they were famous, Lange once told Bocchetti, "If I'm ever on TV as a talk show host, you are my Ed McMahon." He has worked with Lange often after the show's cancellation.

Bocchetti's television work includes appearances on two seasons of NBC's Last Comic Standing in 2003 and 2006. He played a homeless man in the 2004 Monk episode "Mr. Monk Takes Manhattan". He appeared on the Louis C.K. series Louie in 2015. He was a guest on 25 episodes of Mary Dimino's New York-area cable-TV series Nights With Mary between 2003 and 2012.

He formed a production company with comedian Ken Burmeister, Blasted Films, which made Tubby Man: Hero of the Bullied, a semi-autobiographical comedy web series with an anti-bullying message, for Blip TV in 2013.

In May 2024, Bocchetti starred as the fictional President of the United States, Jimble, in a season 2 episode of Adult Swim's comedy cartoon Smiling Friends.

=== Radio and podcasts ===
Bocchetti has been a frequent guest on talk-radio shows and podcasts including The Howard Stern Show and Opie and Anthony, as well as The Jim Breuer Show, The Chip Chipperson Podcast, The Dump with Steve Conti, The Anthony Cumia Show, The Miserable Men Show and The Slant.

In 2014, Bocchetti started his own podcast, The Mike Bocchetti Show, which ran for 13 episodes.

In December 2019, he began co-hosting a new podcast with Lange, Artie Lange's Halfway House. Lange suspended the podcast in February 2020.

At the end of 2022, Mike, with co host Jenny, relaunched his podcast The Mike Bocchetti Show on YouTube. The interview format has Mike and Jenny interviewing multiple guests on each episode.

=== Film ===
In 2002, Bocchetti played one of the Grand Masters of the Illuminati in avant-garde artist Matthew Barney's film Cremaster 3. Other film work includes the 2003 indie comedy Chooch and 2020 Christina Ricci drama Faraway Eyes.

In 2009, Bocchetti starred in a short documentary directed by Lee Schloss, Who Is Mike Bocchetti?, covering his career and work with Lange, and including interviews with comedians including Colin Quinn.

=== Albums ===
Bocchetti's debut album, Thank You, was released in 2019 on Stand Up! Records. Comedy website Laughspin compared Thank You favorably with Rodney Dangerfield's darkly self-deprecating persona, as did Richard Lanoie of The Serious Comedy Site, who also felt that Bocchetti "is not for the casual comedy fan and requires some patience to really appreciate."

=== Books and writing ===
In 2018, Bocchetti published an autobiography, Still Standing, covering his life from childhood through his 2017 heart attack.

In 2015, he wrote an ongoing interview column, The Bocchetti Files, for website The Interrobang.

== Discography ==
- Mike Bocchetti, Thank You (Stand Up! Records, 2019)

== Personal life ==
Bocchetti was diagnosed with obsessive–compulsive disorder at age 26 and is a recovering alcoholic who has been sober since 1997. He had a heart attack in 2017.
