= Toy Hunter =

- Genre: Documentary
- Starring: Jordan Hembrough
- Country of origin: United States
- No. of seasons: 3
- No. of episodes: 41

Production
- Executive producers: Ashley McFarlin Buie; Daniel A. Schwartz; Matt Sharp
- Running time: 30 minutes (with commercials)
- Production company: Sharp Entertainment

Original release
- Network: Travel Channel
- Release: August 15, 2012 – April 16, 2014

Toy Hunter is an American reality documentary television series on the Travel Channel that debuted August 15, 2012. The series document the exploits of toy dealer Jordan Hembrough and sometimes his sidekick Steve Savino as they visit collections from some of the most popular cities on the East and West Coasts. In September 2012, Travel Channel announced the series' renewal for a second season, which consists of thirteen episodes. It airs in the United Kingdom and Ireland on Quest, in Australia on Foxtel channel A&E and Fetch channel Travel Channel.

== Episodes ==
Pilot Episode

A pilot for the series, entitled "Toy Hunters: NY Comic Con" aired on 1/15/12. It was a one hour episode. In this pilot, there were some differences from the series that followed. One example is that shop assistant Julia Collier is nowhere to be found. The female assistant is played by Nicky. She assists at the Comic Con in New York City as well, along with a male assistant who is never seen in the series again. Jordan repeatedly refers to the series as "the Toy Hunters".

In this pilot, Jordan travels to Cincinnati and Miami to pick up items for New York City Comic Con. In Cincinnati, he acquires a rare rocket-firing "Boba Fett" prototype, while in Miami, he comes across a Thundercats "Mad Bubbbler" prototype from the designer of the item himself. About half of the footage from this pilot was edited into Episode 13 of Season One, entitled "Comic Con NYC".

This double-length episode, along with every other episode of the series, can be viewed on the Travel Channel website.

Season	Episodes	Originally released	
Season	Episodes	First released	Last released
1	14	August 15, 2012	December 12, 2012
2	13	April 10, 2013	June 26, 2013
3	14	October 20, 2013	April 16, 2014

=== Season 1 (2012) ===
No. overall	No. in season	Title	Original release date
1	1	"Jersey Shore"	August 15, 2012
Jordan heads to the Jersey Shore to explore an outdoor shed filled with old collectible toys. Later, he sweeps an attic, leaving no corner unturned, and stumbles upon a hefty Star Wars collection.
2	2	"Rise From Ashland"	August 15, 2012
The ultimate Toy Hunter, Jordan Hembrough, travels through North Carolina in search of toy gold. Amongst his findings is a G.I. Joe action figure from China, a limited-edition Rodimus Prime action figure and much more.
3	3	"Texas Toy Step"	August 22, 2012
Jordan does it big in the state of Texas as he tries to wrangle a huge find for one of the largest auction houses in the country. Jordan is in awe when he enters a Superman-themed cave, complete with the original cape worn by Christopher Reeves.
4	4	"Million Dollar Magazine"	August 29, 2012
Jordan searches around San Francisco, hoping to turn up a few amazing, vintage, pop culture finds. A search at one woman's house uncovers the best nostalgic games of all time: the Simon handheld game, a Slinky and an Easy Bake Oven.
5	5	"Prehistoric Pennsylvania"	September 12, 2012
Jordan takes a trip through Ohio and Pennsylvania to dig up some toy gold. While there, Jordan digs through attics, flea markets and peoples homes as he comes across some of his best finds to date.
6	6	"Mississippi Menace"	September 19, 2012
Jordan visits Mississippi to hunt down some of the best action figures around. While there, he gets his hands on a Freddy Krueger statue and a Super Powers Superman action figure.
7	7	"It's Chiller Time"	September 26, 2012
Jordan gets a scare when faced with finding a rare item in time for the annual Chiller Theatre Expo. Amongst his finds are Chucky dolls, a Green Ghost game and an old Frankenstein robot.
8	8	"West Coast Wonders"	October 10, 2012
Jordan heads to LA to meet 2 bigwigs who send him out to hunt for a "big ticket" item. Finding toys with "wow" factor is Jordan's specialty, so he's got to live up to his reputation. He also receives help from a very special co-star, Making Monster’s Jordu Schell.
9	9	"Taking Tennessee"	October 24, 2012
Jordan sets his sights on Knoxville, TN, where he finds an Evel Knievel stunt set, a vintage Flash Gordon action figure, the Knight Rider car and more.
10	10	"Southern Space Chase"	November 7, 2012
Jordan travels to galaxies far, far away (ok, not that far -- Florida), in hopes of stocking up on Star Wars figurines and replenishing his Star Trek action figure inventory.
11	11	"Boston Toy Party"	November 14, 2012
Jordan digs his way through Boston on one of his biggest hunts yet. Jordan first tackles a bedroom being devoured by toys and follows that up with a collection that has taken over an entire home.
12	12	"Houston the Toys Have Landed"	November 28, 2012
Jordan travels to Houston, TX, and comes across a few NERF fencing swords, a Star Wars lunch box, a Green Hornet Black Beauty car and other toy gems.
13	13	"Comic Con NYC"	December 5, 2012
Jordan packs up some of his most valued toys, such as the rocket-firing Boba Fett and Godzilla, and heads to the nation's capital before taking on the biggest event of the year -- New York Comic Con!
14	14	"Hunt for Misfit Toys (Holiday Special)"	December 12, 2012
Jordan is on the hunt for some Yuletide bestsellers of the past, while also searching for misfit toys that are always in high demand around the holidays.

=== Season 2 (2013) ===
No. overall	No. in season	Title	Original release date
15	1	"KISS and Tell"	April 10, 2013
Jordan heads to LA and receives a special surprise call from rock legend, Gene Simmons of KISS! Gene accompanies Jordan on a hunt to pick up as much rare KISS memorabilia as he can, including a KISS radio-controlled van that could cost Gene a fortune.
16	2	"Toy Lovers"	April 10, 2013
Jordan and his sidekick Steve head to Virginia on a quest for vintage toys and end up making a bet to see who can find the most valuable toy. Through their search, they find the Six Million Dollar Man Control Center, as well as the Fonz pinball machine.
17	3	"Chi Toy-Town"	April 17, 2013
Jordan heads to the "nerd-seum" in the Windy City to hunt for toys with a diverse group of collectors. While there, Jordan comes away with a Batman Space Probe Set and a Ghost Busters Proton Pack.
18	4	"Finding Bigfoot"	April 24, 2013
Jordan hunts through Florida to finally get his hands on the 6 Million Dollar Man's elusive arch enemy, Big Foot. He completes his first ever trade off with another big-ticket item he found in Florida.
19	5	"Battle For Seattle"	May 1, 2013
Jordan travels to California and Florida to find big-ticket items to sell at the Seattle Comic Con, but his plans are threatened by surprise competition. Jordan's goal is to make $15,000 in sales -- can he do it?
20	6	"Buying 4 Bonaduce"	May 8, 2013
Jordan is hunting for rare Partridge Family toys to impress Danny Bonaduce. After seeing a picture of Danny riding a unicycle on the set of The Partridge Family, Jordan goes out on a limb and purchases one in hopes of wow-ing him.
21	7	"80's Flashbax"	May 15, 2013
Jordan's in Missouri, the "Show-Me" State, searching for toys exclusively from the 1980s. From rare Star Wars memorabilia and Pee-wee Herman play sets to Karate Kid games, Jordan scores big.
22	8	"Nerd of Mouth"	May 22, 2013
Jordan and Steve hit the road in search of the perfect toy to impress comedian and comic book fanatic, Mike Lawrence. Jordan brings his finds to Mike’s “Nerd of Mouth” podcast in hopes of helping him rekindle his love of collecting.
23	9	"GI Jackpot"	May 29, 2013
Jordan is in Anaheim, CA, preparing for WonderCon, one of the largest comic conventions in the country. But before he sets up his booth, he goes on a hunt for vintage GI Joe toys. Will Jordan be able to make his personal sales goal of $25,000?
24	10	"Playing with Fire"	June 5, 2013
Jordan is on the hunt for extremely expensive toys for Dave Hill, a popular comedian, who's ready to spend thousands. Elsewhere, Steve makes an impulsive and pricey purchase, a strange action figure that may not even sell.
25	11	"Toy Tycoon"	June 12, 2013
Jordan and his amateur toy-dealing friend Travis are in Massachusetts digging for high-priced and highly popular items to sell at Chicago’s pop culture event, C2E2. Jordan is on the lookout for big-ticket items that will net him a $20,000 profit.
26	12	"Buck Rodgers Bet"	June 19, 2013
Jordan travels to Las Vegas with his assistant Julia for her first-ever toy hunt. He regrets the decision to bring her along when she makes a pricey purchase without his approval. But when Julia lines up a celebrity buyer, will it be enough to redeem her?
27	13	"Caribbean Booty"	June 26, 2013
Jordan gears up for Puerto Rico Comic Con! Not only is he looking for the rarest and most obscure toys, but also classic American toys that are new to the scene, including McDonald's puppets, Batman activity box and the Beatles Flip Your Wig game.

=== Season 3 (2014) ===
No. overall	No. in season	Title	Original release date
28	0	"Toy Haunter Halloween Special"	October 20, 2013
While keeping his eyes peeled for extremely rare and vintage monster memorabilia for Metallica guitarist, Kirk Hammett, Jordan is on the hunt for scary toys to sell to his fans at HorrorHound Weekend in Cincinnati, OH.
29	1	"Rapping Dmc Toys"	January 29, 2014
Jordan and his crew are busy selling toys at New York Comic Con, when several celebrities, including Baggage Battles’ Billy Leroy and DMC from the legendary hip-hop group, Run DMC, show up in need of Jordan’s expertise.
30	2	"$28K Wonder Woman"	February 5, 2014
Jordan is attending his first-ever Stan Lee Comikaze Expo and wants to stock up on superhero memorabilia in the hopes of meeting the Marvel comic legend. Jordan hopes to sell $35,000 worth of merchandise -- a lofty goal for a toy dealer at a comic book convention.
31	3	"Giant Toys"	February 12, 2014
Jordan and his sidekick Steve are on the hunt for iconic toys for a 3-D manufacturing company to supersize. The duo heads to the ToyMan Toy show in St. Louis to test out their luck.
32	4	"$25,000 Toys Ahoy!"	February 19, 2014
Jordan's gearing up for New York Comic Con, and this time his sales goal is higher than ever -- $45,000. He gets a lead on the 12 original Star Wars action figures that could be worth tens of thousands of dollars, but will he be able to make a deal with their owner?
33	5	"Money Masters"	February 26, 2014
A major toy company sends Jordan on a mission in search of vintage Masters of the Universe memorabilia. If Jordan succeeds, not only will his collection be displayed at San Diego Comic-Con, but he'll also land a once-in-a-lifetime client.
34	6	"Taboo Toys"	March 5, 2014
Jordan is on the hunt for rare 1980s wrestling figures for Grammy award-winning artist, Taboo from The Black Eyed Peas. Elsewhere, a tip from a friend gives Jordan the unique opportunity to dig through the personal collection of Championship wrestler, Hulk Hogan.
35	7	"The Duke of Toys"	March 12, 2014
Before Jordan sets up shop at his first international Comic Con in Birmingham, England, he decides to hunt through the states to stock up on both classic American and classic British TV / film toys and memorabilia.
36	8	"Toys Touchdown"	March 19, 2014
Jordan was tasked by NFL All-Star, Israel Idonije, to help find a variety of action figures with different amounts of articulation, sizing, and overall playability.
37	9	"Superhero Sanctuary"	March 26, 2014
Jordan searches for superhero memorabilia to display at the Hall of Heroes Museum in Elkhart, Ind., and tries to impress the collection's owner with a mint-condition statue of Captain Marvel from 1946.
38	10	"Toys, Toys, Baby"	April 2, 2014
Jordan ends up purchasing a pair of $1500 sneakers while searching for rare "Teenage Mutant Ninja Turtles" memorabilia for rapper Vanilla Ice.
39	11	"90s Flashbacks"	April 9, 2014
Jordan brings young Travis with him as he searches for toys from the 1990s and 2000s that should appeal to the youthful Portland Comic Con crowd. Among his finds: a $10,000 set of Transformers.
40	12	"Live and Let Play"	April 16, 2014
Jordan gets the chance to buy a 1965 James Bond Attaché Case, something he has spent a year hunting down, but there's a catch if he wants the deal to happen. Jordan and Steve visit Pittsburgh to see the worlds biggest Munsters collection to help seal the deal.
41	13	"Chewy Mexico Toys"	April 16, 2014
Season 3 ends with Jordan looking for high-priced Mexican versions of American toys, some of which he'll attempt to sell to Chuy Bravo. Included: WWE wrestler Zack Ryder offers advice on where to search over the border.

== Home media ==
At this time, only Season One has been released on home media, on the DVD format only. It is available burn-on-demand from Amazon.
