= Chad Millman =

American journalist and media executive

Chad Millman is an American author, journalist, and media executive. He is best known as the co-founder of The Action Network, a sports betting media company launched in 2017 and acquired by Better Collective in 2021 for $240 million. Millman previously served as editor-in-chief of ESPN The Magazine and ESPN.com, where he oversaw the launch of ESPN’s sports betting coverage. His career has been profiled in national outlets, including a 2024 feature in Bloomberg Businessweek on the role of sports betting in sports media.

== Early life and education ==
Millman was raised in Highland Park, Illinois. He graduated from Indiana University Bloomington in 1993 with a degree in journalism and political science.

== Career ==
=== Sports Illustrated ===
Millman began his career in 1993 as a reporter at Sports Illustrated, where he covered national sports stories for five years.

=== ESPN ===
Millman joined ESPN The Magazine in 1998 and contributed feature stories, including a 2009 profile of poker player Phil Ivey. He appeared on ESPN programs such as SportsCenter and E:60, and in 2011 was named editor-in-chief of the magazine.

As editorial director of ESPN Digital Content, Millman helped launch initiatives including The Body Issue and the docuseries We The Fans.

=== The Action Network ===
In 2017, Millman joined The Chernin Group to help launch The Action Network, a digital sports betting media company. The company was acquired by Better Collective in 2021 for $240 million. Millman co-hosts The Favorites podcast with professional bettor Simon Hunter, which has been included in industry roundups of notable sports betting podcasts.

=== The Volume ===
In September 2025, Millman announced his resignation from The Action Network after eight years with the company. He subsequently joined Colin Cowherd’s The Volume Podcast Network to host a new sports betting show, Sharp or Square.

== Books ==
Millman has written or co-written several nonfiction books

- Pickup Artists: Street Basketball in America (1998), with Lars Anderson, on street basketball culture.
- The Odds: One Season, Three Gamblers, and the Death of Their Las Vegas (2001) — described by the Detroit Free Press as a "roller-coaster experience."
- The Detonators: The Secret Plot to Destroy America and an Epic Hunt for Justice (2006) — reviewed by Kirkus Reviews as "an intriguing, bracing tale... fast-paced and vivid."
- Invincible: My Journey from Fan to NFL Team Captain (2006), co-authored with Vince Papale, recounts Papale’s path to the NFL; the book was adapted into the 2006 Disney film Invincible.
- Iceman: My Fighting Life (2008), with Chuck Liddell — a New York Times bestseller and autobiographical fight memoir.
- The Ones Who Hit the Hardest (2010), with Shawn Coyne, chronicling the Pittsburgh Steelers and labor history in football.
- They Call Me Baba Booey (2010), co-written with Gary Dell’Abate of The Howard Stern Show.

== Awards and recognition ==
Millman was inducted into the Sports Betting Hall of Fame in 2025 by SBC Events.

During his tenure at ESPN, The Magazine received multiple nominations for the National Magazine Awards, and in 2017 won the Ellie Award for General Excellence.

He has also been a featured speaker at conferences including the MIT Sloan Sports Analytics Conference and Sports Business Journal’s Dealmakers event.
