= Artie Lange =

American comedian (born 1967)

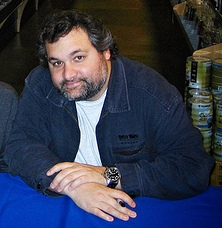
- Lange in September 2006
- Born: Arthur Steven Lange Jr. October 11, 1967 (age 59); Livingston, New Jersey, U.S.
- Occupations: Stand-up comedian; actor; radio personality

Comedy career
- Years active: 1987–2022
- Medium: Stand-up, television, film, radio

Arthur Steven Lange Jr. (born October 11, 1967) is an American stand-up comedian, actor, and radio personality. He is best known for his tenures as a sketch performer on the television series Mad TV from 1995 to 1997 and as the third mic of The Howard Stern Show from 2001 to 2009. Raised in New Jersey, Lange worked as a longshoreman and taxi driver to support his family after his father was paralyzed in a workplace accident. He debuted as a stand-up comedian in 1987 and turned professional five years later, breaking through at Caroline's on Broadway and developing a storytelling-driven act on the New York City club circuit.

In 1995, Lange relocated to Los Angeles to join the inaugural cast of Mad TV. His tenure on the series was severely disrupted by his worsening cocaine dependency, which resulted in a suicide attempt and a subsequent drug-related arrest in 1996 that led to his departure. Following a period of severe depression and development deals with Fox and NBC, comedian Norm Macdonald cast Lange as the co-lead in the comedy film Dirty Work (1998). This exposure secured Lange further television roles, notably as a series regular on Macdonald's ABC sitcom The Norm Show from 1999 to 2001. Lange returned to the East Coast in 2001 to replace Jackie Martling on The Howard Stern Show. During a peak tenure on the program that was periodically disrupted by a severe heroin addiction, he released two comedy albums, co-wrote, produced, and starred in the feature film Artie Lange's Beer League (2006), and authored his first book, Too Fat to Fish (2008), which debuted at number one on The New York Times Best Seller list.

Following an impaired live broadcast in December 2009, Lange was placed on an indefinite leave of absence, marking his permanent departure from Stern's show. His career was further disrupted in early 2010 by a severe suicide attempt that resulted in a lengthy psychiatric and rehabilitation stay. Upon his recovery, Lange returned to broadcast media, hosting several independent radio programs and podcasts—including The Nick & Artie Show and The Artie Quitter Podcast—and co-starring in the HBO comedy series Crashing. He also authored two subsequent memoirs detailing his struggles with substance abuse: Crash and Burn (2013) and Wanna Bet? (2018). Following a series of drug-related arrests and court-mandated treatment between 2018 and 2019, Lange achieved sobriety and briefly resumed stand-up before entering a permanent retirement from entertainment in February 2022.

== Early life ==
Lange was born on October 11, 1967, in Livingston, New Jersey, and was raised with his sister, Stacy, in Union Township, Union County. His mother, Judy (née Caprio), of Italian descent, was a housewife, while his father, Arthur Lange Sr., of German and Native American descent, was a general contractor who installed television antennas. Two weeks after Lange's birth, his father went on trial for keeping $200,000 in counterfeit money for a loan shark, but was spared jail time out of the court's sympathy for his young son. Though raised believing his father was entirely of German descent, a 2003 DNA test later revealed that Lange is approximately twenty-five percent Native American.

Lange attended Union High School, during which he played baseball and became an all-county third baseman. His poor grades required him to attend summer school in order to graduate. In August 1985, shortly before entering college, Lange was arrested for an attempted bank robbery after a flirtatious prank went wrong. In an attempt to impress his girlfriend, he passed a bank teller a note demanding $50,000 and claiming he was armed. When he realized the teller was taking the threat seriously, Lange aborted the attempt and claimed it was a joke; however, the teller had already triggered a silent alarm. His charge was reduced to disorderly conduct, which required Lange to pay $500 in court fees and complete 25 hours of community service in March 1986. As part of his probation, Lange later attended the Connecticut School of Broadcasting from March to June 1987.

In the autumn of 1985, Lange gained admission to Seton Hall University in New Jersey using a connection his uncle had with an employee of the admissions department. In one early assignment, he received an A grade for a presentation he made, telling stories about his friends and family to the class, later recalling, "It was the first time I got a bunch of laughs in front of a crowd of total strangers and it felt amazing to get that reaction from people." After four weeks, however, Lange had become bored of studying and began to think of ways to quit.

His plans changed drastically on October 18, 1985, when his father fell off a ladder while installing an antenna and broke his back, becoming a quadriplegic. Money soon became an issue in the family; Lange spent a short time installing antennas and his mother became a secretary. To make ends meet, the family took out a second mortgage, while Medicaid paid for a nurse eight hours a day. When his mother returned from working as a secretary all day, she acted as the primary caretaker, setting her alarm clock throughout the night to turn Arthur Sr. so he wouldn't get bedsores. In 1987, the family contacted celebrities asking them to donate items for auction. Radio personality Howard Stern, the only one to respond, sent them an autographed jacket and joked on the air, "Does this guy think that if he puts the jacket on he's going to walk again?"—a remark that both Lange and his father found humorous. Lange's father died from complications of an infection in 1990.

== Career ==
=== 1987–1995: Career beginnings ===
Caroline's on Broadway in Manhattan served as an important breakthrough venue for Lange in the early 1990s, where his improvisational comedy troupe "Live on Tape" performed multiple sold-out showcases.

Lange cites Richard Pryor, Richard Lewis, and George Carlin as early comedy influences. On July 12, 1987, at nineteen years old, Lange performed his first stand-up comedy routine at The Improv in Hell's Kitchen, Manhattan. He later recalled the experience: "I bombed for five minutes. Everyone thinks that they can do better. I was unprepared, I mumbled, and I forgot stuff. But I'm proud that I did it." Following this performance, he stepped away from stand-up for four years. In the spring of 1988, Lange took acting classes for three weeks under Sandy Dennis at HB Studio on Bank Street in Greenwich Village, but he withdrew after he could no longer afford the tuition fee.

To help financially support his family, Lange secured employment as a longshoreman at Port Newark in February 1991, loading cargo ships at an orange juice pier and earning approximately $60,000 that year. Driven by his desire to enter show business and recognizing that stand-up performances were financially accessible compared to acting courses, Lange resigned from his longshoreman job in September 1992. He allotted himself a one-year timeframe to achieve professional success in stand-up comedy.

While pursuing comedy full-time, Lange earned a steady income driving a taxi cab in New York City, utilizing the flexible hours to perform at local venues between driving shifts. His first paid performance occurred at the United States Merchant Marine Academy in Kings Point, New York, for which he received $30. Later in 1992, he secured status as a paid regular comic at Stand Up NY in Manhattan, and subsequently at Comic Strip Live, where he regularly performed 20-minute routines from Tuesday through Saturday evenings.

Within a year of his professional stand-up pivot, Lange expanded into acting, landing a role in a regional dinner theater production of Tony n' Tina's Wedding that toured various restaurants and catering halls across New Jersey. He concurrently co-formed "Live on Tape", an improv troupe that achieved multiple sold-out performances at Caroline's on Broadway. The mainstream visibility of these shows led to a representation contract with the William Morris Agency, where Lange was paired with talent manager Peter Principato, initiating a ten-year professional partnership. This representation yielded supplemental commercial acting opportunities that Lange considered a significant professional advancement, including a prominent voiceover role for Foot Locker that qualified him for membership in the AFTRA union. Amidst this rapid career growth, Lange developed a severe dependence on cocaine and alcohol.

=== 1995–1997: Mad TV, first suicide attempt, and legal issues ===
At age twenty-seven, Lange was selected as one of eight initial cast members for the sketch comedy series Mad TV, chosen from a pool of approximately eight thousand applicants. He relocated to Los Angeles in May 1995 to film the television pilot, which was subsequently greenlit by the Fox network. Lange moved permanently to Los Angeles two months later for production on the first season. The role provided him with a substantial signing bonus and a salary of $7,500 per episode, which escalated his severe cocaine dependency; during this period, Lange recalled using the drug heavily.

In November 1995, after nine episodes had been filmed, Lange attempted suicide after exhausting his supply of cocaine, consuming whiskey alongside various pills and leaving a suicide note for his mother and sister. He later stated that he had been entirely intent on dying. He was discovered by his Mad TV co-stars and admitted to an intensive care unit. Following the incident, Lange returned to New Jersey to complete a rehabilitation and counseling program. Upon completing treatment, he developed a new 45-minute stand-up set and leveraged his television profile to headline performances at comedy clubs across New York City, which he supplemented with commercial voiceover work.

In January 1996, Lange returned to Los Angeles to complete the remainder of the first season. Series producer Quincy Jones supported Lange's recovery and provided his private jet for transport. Lange's performance stabilized, and he later evaluated his work in these episodes as his strongest output in sketch comedy, highlighted by the creation of his recurring character, White Mama. In mid-1996, Lange secured his first major feature film role in the independent production Puppet, starring Rebecca Gayheart and Fred Weller. Lange later noted that he never viewed the final film, as it did not receive a wide commercial release.

Production for the second season of Mad TV commenced in August 1996. Two months later, Lange relapsed and resumed using cocaine. His tenure on the series ended in November 1996 after his agent, castmates, and crew members attempted an intervention. The incident was precipitated by Lange losing a $15,000 bet on the Mike Tyson vs. Evander Holyfield boxing match, after which he arrived at rehearsals under the influence of cocaine. Lange fled the studio lot, prompting a physical pursuit by his colleagues through nearby streets. The episode culminated in his arrest in a supermarket parking lot, after which he served a brief sentence at the Los Angeles County Jail. The criminal case was ultimately never tried in court. While incarcerated, Lange received a voicemail message from director Cameron Crowe informing him that his appearance alongside Tom Cruise and Kelly Preston in the film Jerry Maguire had been omitted from the final cut.

Following his release from jail, Lange returned to New Jersey in January 1997 and spent a brief period inside a psychiatric hospital, a timeframe he described as the most depressing period of his life. He subsequently relapsed into a severe clinical depression. After Mad TV producers urged him to complete formal medical treatment, Lange spent two months at the Honesty House rehabilitation center in Stirling, New Jersey. Fox executives opted not to renew his contract for the show's third season, though Lange later returned to make special guest appearances during the fifth, tenth, and fourteenth seasons.

=== 1997–2001: Dirty Work and The Norm Show ===
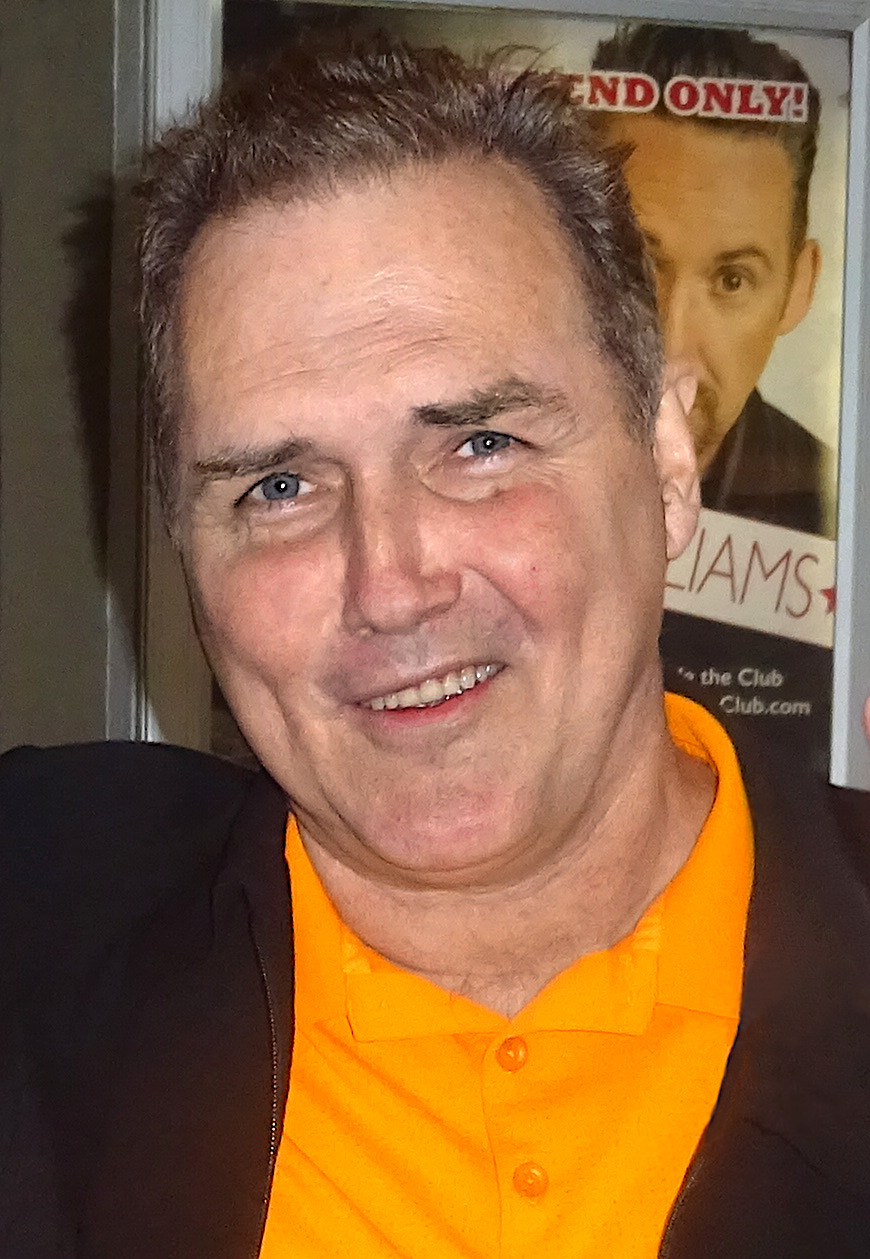
Comedian Norm Macdonald (pictured in 2016) rejuvenated Lange's career in 1997 by casting him as the co-lead in the comedy film Dirty Work and later hiring him for The Norm Show.

In 1997, Lange left rehabilitation and resumed performing stand-up comedy in New York City. His clinical depression began to subside after he was invited to audition for two network television sitcoms, an opportunity he noted significantly renewed his professional confidence. During these network negotiations, Lange was contacted by comedian and actor Norm Macdonald, who invited him to audition for the co-lead role in his comedy buddy film Dirty Work (1998), directed by Bob Saget. Macdonald had been unable to find a suitable actor for the part until he happened to view an episode of Mad TV, where he observed Lange delivering an out-of-character monologue; Macdonald found the performance humorous and remarked that Lange possessed a distinct melancholy reminiscent of comedian John Belushi.

Macdonald considered Lange's initial script reading to be exceptional, securing him the role. However, to clear him for production, MGM required Lange to present an official approval report from his New Jersey rehabilitation facility, an administrative obstacle Lange resolved by making a $1,500 private donation to the center. Filming took place over a two-month period in Toronto. To promote the film, Lange made his debut guest appearance on The Howard Stern Show alongside Macdonald on January 8, 1998. The pair returned to the program later that year, and made two subsequent appearances in 1999.

Lange credited Macdonald and Saget with rejuvenating his career after the mainstream exposure from Dirty Work generated multiple film and television offers. Following the conclusion of filming, various network executives and production heads expressed interest in hiring Lange. A competitive bidding war ensued among major networks, involving meetings with executives including Warren Littlefield of NBC and Peter Roth of Fox. With representation from the William Morris Agency, Lange signed a $750,000 development deal with Fox in late 1997, an increase from an initial $250,000 offer, which enabled him to alleviate his mother's outstanding financial debts.

Although Fox did not greenlight any of Lange's series pitches, he supported himself financially by performing at comedy clubs throughout Los Angeles. In April 1998, Lange co-wrote and starred in a television pilot titled The King of New York, which featured Luis Guzmán in the cast; however, Lange felt the project was rushed into production by the network at the last minute, which compromised its overall quality. Weeks later, Lange signed a second development deal, securing a $350,000 contract with NBC. Between 1999 and 2000, Lange secured minor roles in several feature films, including Mystery Men, The Bachelor, The 4th Floor, and Lost & Found, while concurrently touring as the opening stand-up act for Macdonald.

In 1999, Lange joined the cast of Macdonald's sitcom The Norm Show during its second season, portraying Macdonald's half-brother, Artie. Lange remained with the series until its cancellation in 2001 after three seasons. While he achieved substantial financial success during this period—earning $35,000 per episode and residing in a $4,000-a-month condominium in Beverly Hills—Lange later noted that he felt creatively unfulfilled by the program's conventional writing style. In 2014, Lange stated that this creative frustration motivated him to pursue stand-up comedy with greater intensity, allowing him to mature artistically by integrating darker, edgier material into his live act.

=== 2001–2008: Joining The Howard Stern Show and rising profile ===
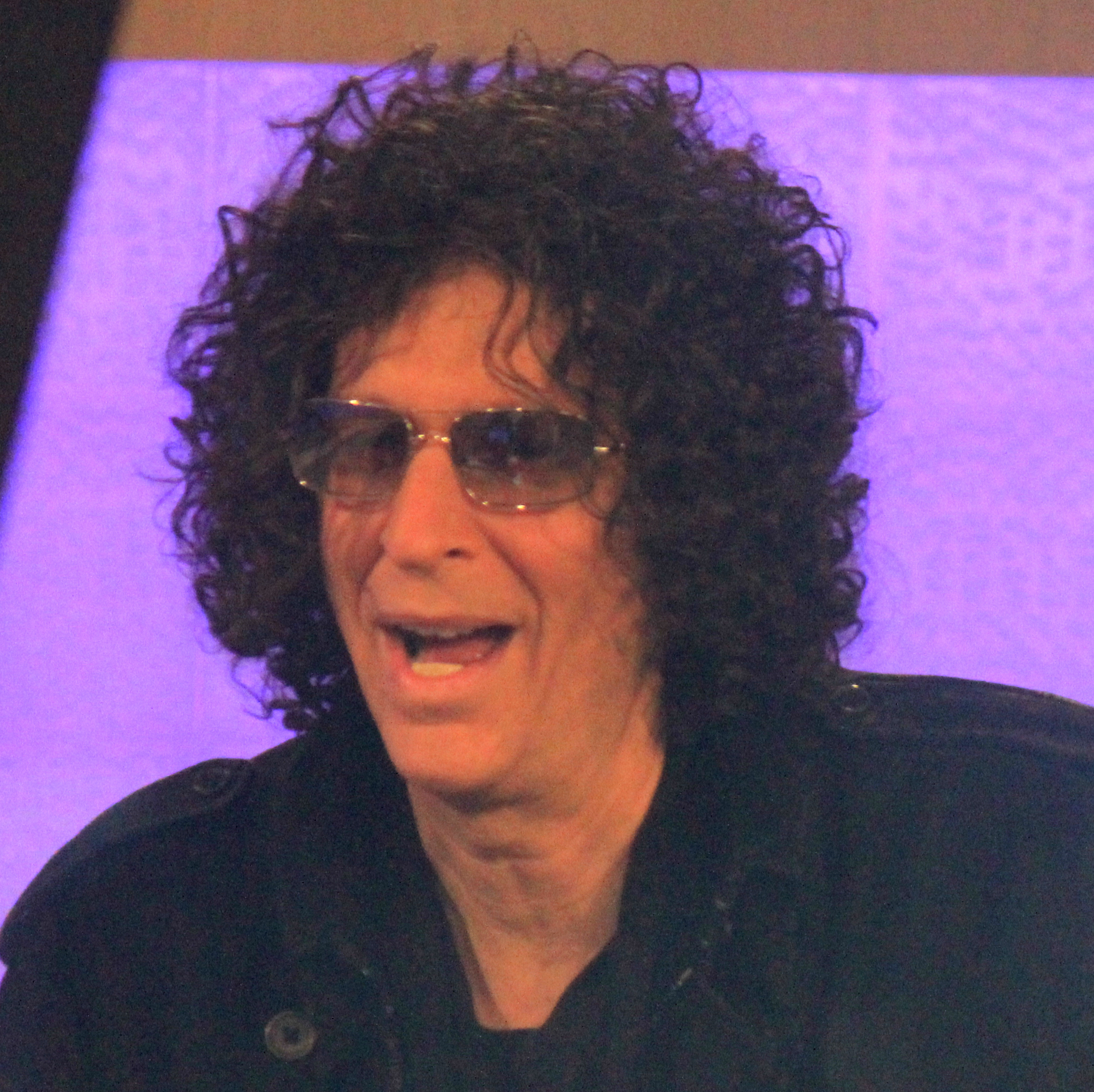
Radio host Howard Stern hired Lange full-time in October 2001 following an on-air audition process to fill the vacancy left by Jackie Martling.

In March 2001, comedian and writer Jackie Martling departed The Howard Stern Show. In response, Stern announced the "Win Jackie's Money" contest, inviting several comedians to audition for the vacant position by sitting in on live broadcasts. Having been introduced to the program in 1982 by his father, Lange had developed an immense appreciation for the show's staff and on-air dynamics. Regarding his invitation to participate, Lange recalled telling his manager that while he might not be the most talented applicant in the group, he was guaranteed to be the biggest fan. Following the cancellation of The Norm Show in April 2001, Lange returned to New Jersey and appeared as a guest host on several broadcasts between May and October 2001. Though Lange initially believed he had jeopardized his chances because the written jokes he submitted for Stern were not utilized, the producers instead decided to keep his microphone active continuously, instructing him to contribute naturally as himself.

Lange quickly established a strong rapport with Stern, the production staff, and the listening audience. Media commentators noted his appeal, with one reporter crediting his relatable demeanor, and another describing him as a comic Everyman who articulated what the home audience was thinking. Although Lange was prepared to relocate to Los Angeles if he was not selected, he accepted a full-time contract to join the program, characterizing the career opportunity as a major blessing.

Following his hiring, Lange's comedy career expanded into larger performance venues alongside new film and television opportunities. He signed with the United Talent Agency in June 2002. Around this time, Lange collaborated with writer and producer Sam Simon on a comedy pilot for DreamWorks intended to broadcast on NBC, though the project did not progress to a full series. In September 2003, Lange secured a one-year talent holding deal with ABC and Touchstone Television. When Stern announced his upcoming transition from terrestrial broadcasting to Sirius Satellite Radio in late 2004, Infinity Broadcasting offered Lange a four-year, $20 million contract to remain at WXRK and replace Stern as the morning host, with Gary Dell'Abate remaining as producer. Both Lange and Dell'Abate rejected the offer to stay with the program during its syndication move to satellite radio.

On December 13, 2004, Lange released his debut stand-up comedy DVD, It's the Whiskey Talkin', which consisted of a 45-minute set recorded at the Tempe Improv in Tempe, Arizona, during a phase of his career when he was focused heavily on touring comedy clubs. Lange later reflected positively on the production, noting that a major distributor handled the release and that it was well received by consumers. Following the DVD's retail release in February 2005, Lange maintained a demanding professional schedule for six months to promote the project, appearing on The Howard Stern Show on weekday mornings while performing stand-up routines nationwide on weekends.

In March 2005, Lange signed an agreement with Ckrush Entertainment to star in and executive produce his own comedy feature film, Artie Lange's Beer League. The project originated in 2001, when Lange began developing a screenplay with director and producer Frank Sebastiano based on Game Day, a 17-minute short film Lange had written, funded, and starred in during the previous year. The script was completed by 2002, and Ckrush subsequently agreed to finance the film with a $2.5 million budget. The pressure of developing the production while simultaneously touring for weekend stand-up engagements severely impacted Lange's health, causing him to abuse alcohol and develop a heavy dependency on prescription painkillers. While attempting to manage withdrawal symptoms during a comedy gig, Lange instead purchased heroin, initiating a severe substance addiction that lasted from March to June 2005 and caused him to miss cast auditions and pre-production meetings.

In June 2005, Lange took a four-day absence from The Howard Stern Show to undergo acute withdrawal at home, generating significant concern regarding a potential drug relapse from his family and radio colleagues. After Sebastiano and the production staff threatened to cancel the film unless he appeared, Lange was prescribed Subutex by a physician, allowing him to stabilize and resume his professional commitments. On the air, Lange initially attributed his absence to an illness brought on by excessive drinking. Principal photography was completed in July 2005, finishing on schedule and within budget. Beer League premiered on September 13, 2006, at the Ziegfeld Theatre before entering a limited theatrical release across North America. To promote the feature, Lange completed a stand-up comedy tour highlighted by a performance at Carnegie Hall that sold out in under three hours. He later disclosed the true nature of his 2005 addiction crisis and absence during a live broadcast with Stern on September 21, 2006.

=== 2008–2009: Bestselling memoir, commercial peak, and Stern Show departure ===
In early 2008, Lange signed a publishing contract with Spiegel & Grau to author his first memoir, Too Fat to Fish, co-written with Anthony Bozza. Upon its retail release on November 11, 2008, Too Fat to Fish achieved significant commercial success, debuting at number one on The New York Times Best Seller list for hardcover nonfiction and remaining on the bestseller chart for eleven weeks. A paperback edition released in 2009 with an additional chapter, peaked at number six on the Best Seller paperback list.

In June 2008, Lange organized and headlined a comedy tour named Operation Mirth with the United Service Organizations (USO) to entertain American military personnel serving in Afghanistan, accompanied by a comedic lineup that included Jim Florentine, Nick DiPaolo, Dave Attell, and producer Gary Dell'Abate. Later that year, Lange and Attell recorded voice acting dialogue for the video game Leisure Suit Larry: Box Office Bust, which was released in 2009.

Lange's severe drug dependency escalated in mid-2008. In August 2008, after relapsing into heroin use, he cancelled a scheduled appearance on Comedy Central Roast of Bob Saget to enter rehabilitation, declining a $65,000 emergency private transport arrangement offered by Comedy Central executives. Instead, he sought outpatient therapy under the guidance of a specialist recommended by comedian Richard Lewis.

By 2009, Lange had reached his financial peak, earning an annual salary of $700,000 from his role on Stern's show alongside approximately $3 million from live stand-up comedy performances. However, his personal life grew increasingly unstable. Following a heroin relapse in December 2008, Lange travelled to West Palm Beach, Florida, in January 2009 to undergo a 21-day residential treatment program, but he voluntarily withdrew after seven days and immediately resumed performing live stand-up in New York City. After suffering another relapse in April 2009, he employed private personal security to manage his recovery and withdrawal symptoms.

On June 15, 2009, Lange made a controversial appearance on the premiere episode of the HBO sports talk series Joe Buck Live. During the live broadcast, Lange engaged in a profane exchange of insults with host Joe Buck, drawing public criticism from HBO Sports president Ross Greenburg for bordering on bad taste. The network cancelled the series after three episodes. Buck later defended Lange's performance, stating that Lange was attempting to deliver the edgy comedy requested by producers, and he subsequently wrote the foreword to Lange's second memoir.

In July 2009, Lange was charged with driving under the influence of an intoxicant and careless driving following a minor traffic accident in New Jersey. His mental health continued to deteriorate, and in October 2009, Lange took a one-week absence from The Howard Stern Show due to severe clinical depression. The following month, he released his second stand-up special, Jack and Coke, as both a CD and DVD recording, which peaked at number one on the iTunes Comedy Albums chart.

Citing severe professional burnout, Lange cancelled his remaining scheduled stand-up performances into 2010 to recover from his substance relapses, develop new material, and work on a second memoir under the working title *College Is for Losers*. Lange's tenure on The Howard Stern Show concluded on December 9, 2009. He arrived at the studio severely impaired after consuming alcohol and painkillers over the preceding seven hours, prompting SiriusXM management to remove him from the broadcast and grant an indefinite leave of absence. Lange voluntarily checked into a Long Island rehabilitation facility to manage withdrawal symptoms but checked out eight days later, entering a severe relapse involving alcohol and prescription drugs at home.

=== 2010–2014: Hospitalization and return to radio ===
On January 2, 2010, Lange attempted suicide for a second time at his residence by consuming bleach, slitting his wrists, and inflicting nine stab wounds to his abdomen with a kitchen knife. He was discovered by his mother, who had arrived at the home alongside his sister, two uncles, and comedian Colin Quinn to stage an intervention. Lange was hospitalized to undergo emergency surgery, and was transferred to a psychiatric facility one week later. While SiriusXM executives initially indicated that Lange would be welcomed back to The Howard Stern Show upon his recovery, Stern later opted against the return, concluding that a resumption of his role on the program would be detrimental to his ongoing health stabilization.

Lange entered a prolonged period of clinical depression and remained largely reclusive at home. His emotional state worsened following the fatal prescription drug overdose of his close friend, comedian Greg Giraldo, which disrupted Lange's initial plans to transition back into public life. In April 2011, after showing minimal clinical progress, Lange was escorted to a New Jersey detoxification center by Quinn and two personal handlers, an event Lange later described as an aggressive intervention that was necessary for his survival. Following a three-week stabilization period, he spent two and a half months completing a residential program at the Ambrosia Treatment Center in Florida. During his recovery, he received personal support from musician Bruce Springsteen. Lange later acknowledged experiencing four or five subsequent relapses involving alcohol, gambling, and prescription analgesics following a physical injury, though he emphasized that writing about the events served as a pathway to self-honesty.

By July 2011, Lange had recovered sufficiently to resume his professional career. He returned to broadcasting on July 6 as a temporary co-host alongside Nick Di Paolo on Fox Sports Radio. The appearance served as a successful pilot test, leading to a syndication agreement with DirecTV for a late-night sports comedy program. On October 3, 2011, The Nick & Artie Show officially launched across approximately thirty national affiliate stations and on SiriusXM. Following Di Paolo's departure in January 2013, the program was rebranded as The Artie Lange Show, with retired American football player Jon Ritchie joining as a co-host. The program remained on the air until its final broadcast on April 28, 2014.

Concurrently, Lange secured an $800,000 publishing advance from Touchstone Books to compose his second memoir, motivated by personal financial needs and a desire to provide a cautionary guide for individuals struggling with substance abuse. Co-authored with Bozza, the book, titled Crash and Burn (2013), chronicled his final years on the Stern show, his psychiatric crisis, and his subsequent rehabilitation. Lange characterized the book as the most transparent work of his professional career. Released on October 29, 2013, the memoir became a commercial success, debuting at number 8 on The New York Times Best Seller list for combined print and e-book sales, and number 12 on the hardcover nonfiction list.

=== 2014–2019: The Artie Quitter Podcast and Crashing ===
Following the cancellation of his DirecTV program, Lange focused on his stand-up career, recording a one-hour comedy special for Comedy Central titled The Stench of Failure, which broadcast on October 18, 2014. In November 2014, Lange generated widespread controversy after posting a series of explicitly racialized and sexually charged messages on Twitter directed at ESPN sportscaster Cari Champion. As a result of the incident, Lange received a lifetime ban from ESPN facilities, and his scheduled television appearances on Comedy Central networks were promptly cancelled.

On January 5, 2015, Lange launched an uncensored, subscription-based digital program titled The Artie Quitter Podcast, which he recorded primarily from his residence in Hoboken, New Jersey. The digital venture secured approximately 9,000 subscribers during its initial year of syndication. Lange paused the production in May 2017 after completing 400 episodes to reallocate his professional focus toward television acting commitments and the drafting of his third book.

Lange returned to mainstream television in 2015, securing guest spots on The Jim Gaffigan Show and appearing in the pilot episode of a new HBO comedy series titled Crashing, starring Pete Holmes. Following HBO's acquisition of the series, executive producer Judd Apatow cast Lange in a prominent recurring role portraying a fictionalized version of himself. Filming commenced in November 2015 and extended throughout 2016, with the series premiere featuring Lange heavily. Lange continued his ensemble role into the show's second season. Concurrently, he filmed a reunion appearance for a special broadcast of Mad TV. To support the release of Crashing in February 2017, Lange joined Holmes and Apatow on a national promotional stand-up comedy tour.

In December 2015, Lange began collaborating with co-author Anthony Bozza on a third book project. After submitting a detailed thematic blueprint to publishers titled The Gambler: A Degenerate's Guide to Living on the Edge, they secured a formal distribution agreement. The completed memoir, titled Wanna Bet?: A Degenerate Gambler's Guide to Living on the Edge, was officially released by Macmillan Publishers in July 2018.

On September 5, 2017, Lange joined the digital subscription platform Compound Media to co-host The Artie and Anthony Show alongside Anthony Cumia, who had previously fronted The Anthony Cumia Show as a solo broadcaster for three years. Lange's participation on the show was disrupted following a December 2017 arrest, resulting in a six-week absence to complete a residential rehabilitation program before returning to his studio duties in late January 2018. However, his ongoing legal challenges and medical complications prompted his formal departure from the program in May 2018.

==== Legal issues and probation ====
On March 12, 2017, Lange was arrested in the parking garage of his apartment complex on three charges relating to the possession of heroin, cocaine, and drug paraphernalia. He was subsequently released on a summons pending a scheduled court appearance. Three days prior to the arrest, series creator Judd Apatow and HBO executives had offered Lange an expanded starring role in an upcoming project alongside a salary increase. Although Lange initially claimed he had been dismissed from the second season of Crashing due to the legal incident, Apatow publicly denied the termination, and Lange later clarified that he remained an active employee of the network.

On April 5, 2017, Lange's original charges were downgraded to three disorderly persons offenses after investigators determined he was not inside the vehicle where the substances were discovered. Following a failure to appear at a subsequent hearing due to an administrative miscommunication by his legal counsel, the court issued a bench warrant for his arrest. He was arrested again on May 12 after being stopped by police for a speeding violation, during which officers observed a bag of heroin in his possession. This sequence of events culminated in Lange being taken into custody on December 12 for failing to satisfy his scheduled court mandates.

During his ongoing legal proceedings, Lange suffered a severe medical emergency. On July 7, 2017, he collapsed following a stand-up performance in Chicago and was rushed to a hospital to undergo emergency thoracic surgery. Lange later noted that a severe infection resulting from long-term substance abuse had spread to his chest cavity, requiring an immediate operative intervention to save his life.

On December 15, 2017, Lange entered a guilty plea for the possession of heroin in exchange for the dismissal of his concurrent cocaine charges. Following the plea agreement, he voluntarily admitted himself to a residential rehabilitation facility, with transport funded by colleagues within the comedy community. Lange completed the residential portion of his treatment in January 2018 and transitioned into a strict five-day-a-week outpatient program that required mandatory drug screenings. He later attributed his substance relapses primarily to unresolved emotional challenges. On June 1, 2018, Lange was sentenced to four years of probation, with the court ordering him to complete fifty hours of community service and remain enrolled in outpatient rehabilitation programs.

In November 2018, Lange announced his decision to enter inpatient rehabilitation alongside comedian Bob Levy. This treatment window followed a violation of his four-year probation sentence after testing positive twice for cocaine and opioids. During his time in the residential program, Lange was permitted to temporarily leave the facility on several occasions to fulfill stand-up comedy engagements before returning to the clinic the same evening. On January 30, 2019, Lange was taken into custody for the possession of a controlled substance and subsequently transferred back into a specialized treatment center.

As part of his court-mandated drug court program requirements, Lange secured employment at a New Jersey gas station in early 2019. On May 21, 2019, he was arrested on a drug court warrant for failing to satisfy compliance terms regarding his probation itinerary. Following a 21-day period of incarceration, Lange was released from jail on June 10, 2019, to begin a comprehensive, multi-month inpatient drug rehabilitation curriculum. Lange successfully completed the residential program and returned home on September 10, 2019, announcing that he had achieved over seven months of continuous sobriety. On January 30, 2020, Lange marked a milestone of one year of sustained sobriety.

=== 2019–present: Halfway House podcast and hiatus ===
Immediately following his release from the residential facility, Lange performed his first stand-up comedy set that evening at the Comedy Cellar in New York City, subsequently resuming regular stand-up commitments across the local circuit. He also announced that he had composed a fourth manuscript during his incarceration, tentatively titled Rippin' & Runnin': Life on Drug Court.

On September 20, 2019, Lange executed a production contract to launch a new digital broadcasting project. The resulting program, Artie Lange's Halfway House, premiered on December 2, 2019, featuring comedian Mike Bocchetti as a regular co-host. The program suspended production following its February 7, 2020 episode, after which Lange entered a professional hiatus later that month, stating that he had returned to public life prematurely and required additional time to focus on his personal recovery program. Lange briefly returned to the public eye in November 2020 to launch a secondary podcast series titled Letters to Artie on The Comics Gym network alongside his talent manager as a co-host; however, the project concluded after one episode, and Lange entered a subsequent career hiatus.

In October 2021, Lange resumed production of Artie Lange's Halfway House, establishing a twice-weekly broadcast schedule supplemented by a subscription platform on Patreon. Lange placed the program on an indefinite hiatus in February 2022 to prioritize his personal health. Actor and longtime associate Jimmy Palumbo publicly clarified that Lange remained sober and was intentionally maintaining a private lifestyle to focus entirely on his medical stability and mental clarity. Lange has since remained largely absent from public life, though his interactions within the comedy community were documented in media-published photographs alongside peers including Jeff Ross in December 2025, and during a subsequent gathering for comedian Dave Attell's birthday in January 2026.

== Personal life ==
From 2002 to 2006, Lange was in a relationship with Dana Cironi. In 2009, he met Adrienne Ockrymiek at a tanning salon, and the couple subsequently became engaged; however, the relationship ended in 2014.

In 2001, Lange bought a penthouse apartment in Hoboken, New Jersey. In 2008, he acquired a 7,000-square-foot summer residence in Toms River, New Jersey, for $2.5 million, featuring a room renovation completed by the production crew of the television series Man Caves. Lange originally placed the bayfront property on the market in 2010, and it was ultimately sold in 2016 for $1.35 million.

In the early 2010s, Lange was diagnosed with Type 2 diabetes and requires daily insulin injections to manage the condition. Following his participation in multiple court-mandated drug treatment programs, he announced in September 2019 that he had achieved seven months of continuous sobriety, subsequently marking one year of sustained recovery in January 2020.

=== Political and social views ===
Lange does not identify as a political liberal, though he has publicly expressed pro-choice views, stated his support for gay rights, and maintained a pro-union stance stemming from his former employment as a longshoreman. In 2017, Lange publicly voiced his support for President Donald Trump. During a 2016 interview with Maxim, he claimed that as a convicted felon, he was subject to felony disenfranchisement and unable to vote.

In 2007, New York City commercial bakery Crumbs began retail distribution of a vanilla and chocolate cupcake designed by Lange, with all proceeds allocated to the HIV/AIDS charity LIFEbeat. In March 2008, LIFEbeat severed ties with Lange and refused further donations after he directed a series of homophobic slurs at a colleague during a live on-air argument on The Howard Stern Show, though the organization and Lange later reached an amicable resolution. In 2013, Lange expressed remorse for his historical use of anti-gay slurs, stating he felt "ashamed and embarrassed" by how his comedic approach had evolved. While maintaining that his performance material was never motivated by personal animus, he stated that he had developed a more responsible approach toward sensitive subject matter in his later career.

== Filmography ==
=== Feature films ===
Film
Year	Title	Role	Notes
1996	Puppet	Alexie	Not released
1996	Jerry Maguire	Sports radio host	Deleted scene
1998	Dirty Work	Sam McKenna	
1999	The 4th Floor	Jerry	
1999	Lost & Found	Wally	
1999	Mystery Men	Big Red	
1999	The Bachelor	Marco	
2000	Shriek If You Know What I Did Last Friday the Thirteenth	Swim Coach Hasselhoff	
2001	Gameday	Artie	Short film
2002	Boat Trip	Brian	
2003	Old School	Booker	
2003	Mail Order Bride	Tommy	
2003	Elf	Fake Santa	
2004	Perfect Opposites	Lenny Steinberg	
2005	Waltzing Anna	Jacob Kline	
2006	Supertwink	The Plumber	
2006	Artie Lange's Beer League	Artie DeVanzo	Writer and producer
2011	Adventures of Serial Buddies	Golden Graham	

=== Television ===
Television
Year	Title	Role	Notes
1995–1997, 1999, 2009	Mad TV	Various characters	41 episodes; also writer
1999–2001	The Norm Show	Artie Henderson	42 episodes
2001	Comedy Central Roast of Hugh Hefner	Himself	Special
2003	The Jamie Kennedy Experiment	Himself	2 episodes
2004	Game Over	Turbo	Voice; 6 episodes
2006	Comedy Central Roast of William Shatner	Himself	Special
2006–2007	Rescue Me	Mike Shea	8 episodes
2007	Entourage	Scott Siegal	Episode: "Gotcha"
2009	Saturday Night Live	Himself	Season 34 Finale/Will Ferrell Host
2009	Joe Buck Live	Himself	2 episodes
2012	Louie	Truck driver	Episode: "Barney/Never"
2014	Inside Amy Schumer	Client	Episode: "Slow Your Roll"
2014	Californication	Teddy	Episode: "Dead Rock Stars"
2015–2016	The Jim Gaffigan Show	Himself	2 episodes
2017–2019	Crashing	Himself	11 episodes

=== Comedy specials ===
Comedy
Year	Title	Distributor	Notes
2004	It's the Whiskey Talkin'	Image Entertainment	
2009	Artie Lange: Jack and Coke	Image Entertainment	
2014	The Stench of Failure	Comedy Central	

== Radio ==
Year	Title	Role
2001–2009	The Howard Stern Show	Himself (contributor/sidekick)
2011–2014	The Artie Lange Show	Himself (host)

== Bibliography ==
Year	Title	Publisher
2009	Too Fat to Fish	Spiegel & Grau
2014	Crash and Burn	Touchstone Books
2018	Wanna Bet?: A Degenerate Gambler's Guide to Living on the Edge	Macmillan USA
