= Anthony Bozza =

American journalist

Anthony Bozza is a New York City-based author and journalist who has written extensively for Rolling Stone and other magazines. He is also the author of bestselling books on Eminem, AC/DC and Artie Lange. Since 2005 he has co-authored numerous autobiographies of artists including Slash, INXS, and Tommy Lee.

== Career ==
Bozza started his career as an intern in 1995 at Rolling Stone, fact-checking, coffee-fetching and doing research for other writers before they hired him full-time in the music department. He answered phones, edited columns and did the odd story, but his big break came after a friend turned him on to an unsigned white rapper from Detroit named Eminem. That tape of a live Eminem freestyle was unlike anything he'd ever heard. He began talking the rapper up to his editors, who told him that if Eminem ever got signed they would let Anthony write a short blurb about him. A year later, Bozza wrote the first national cover story on Eminem.

Bozza wrote six more cover stories, numerous features, and countless other articles during his seven-year tenure at Rolling Stone. He wrote and edited the “Random Notes” section for two years, joining the ranks of “Random Notes” alumni like Cameron Crowe and MTV's Kurt Loder.

In 2002 he left the magazine to write Whatever You Say I Am: The Life and Times of Eminem, which was born of the unparalleled access and hours he had spent with Eminem while working on his Rolling Stone features and beyond. Janet Maslin, culture critic at the New York Times, wrote that it was a “compelling” investigation of the “Shadyfication of America.” The book was a New York Times bestseller and an international bestseller, topping lists in England, Germany, France and South America.

Bozza followed this up by co-writing memoirs with various musicians and other celebrities. His first such book was with Mötley Crüe drummer Tommy Lee, the New York Times Bestseller Tommyland. A biography of Australian legends INXS followed. Then came what Rolling Stone ranked one of the top 5 rock autobiographies of all time, the New York Times Bestseller Slash, co-written with the notoriously taciturn Guns N' Roses guitarist.

Bozza moved into the comedy world next, with the autobiography of stand-up veteran and Howard Stern co-host Artie Lange, Too Fat to Fish. The book debuted at #1 on the New York Times bestseller list and remained there for twenty-two weeks. Bozza returned to music analysis with his next book, the critically acclaimed Why AC/DC Matters, which inspired a series of "Why _ Matters" books in AC/DC's native Australia, Bozza's tome being Volume 1. Two more co-writes followed: I Am the New Black, the autobiography of comedian Tracy Morgan, and Purpose, with Wyclef Jean of the Fugees.

Anthony Bozza has also written for magazines and newspapers worldwide, including Spin, Maxim, The New York Times, The Guardian/Observer (UK), Q, Mojo, Paper, Nylon, Blender, Radar and Playboy. In 2010, along with writer Neil Strauss, he embarked on a three-year experiment in publishing and launched Igniter Literary Group, an imprint of HarperCollins’ It Books.

Bozza and Artie Lange co-wrote another book, Crash and Burn, in 2013, which recounts Lange's lifelong struggle with drug addiction and depression and his near suicide. In 2015, Bozza co-wrote Fleetwood Mac drummer Mick Fleetwood's memoir, Play On: Now, Then, and Fleetwood Mac.

Bozza worked with Courtney Love to co-write her memoir, tentatively titled Girl with the Most Cake, but the experience ended in acrimony. Bozza submitted Love a manuscript in 2014 that he was quite pleased with, later calling it "possibly the greatest thing I’ll ever do with anybody". Love, however, disliked it, and said in an interview that the text made her sound like she was "jacked on coffee and sugar in a really bad mood". Love refused to pay Bozza for the work he had done, and he sued her in 2015 for lack of payment.

== Bibliography ==
=== Non-fiction ===
- Whatever You Say I Am: The Life and Times of Eminem (2004)
- Why AC/DC Matters (2009)
- Not Afraid: The Evolution of Eminem (2019)

=== As co-author ===
- Tommyland with Tommy Lee (2005)
- INXS: Story to Story with INXS (2005)
- Slash with Slash (2007)
- Too Fat to Fish with Artie Lange (2008)
- I Am the New Black with Tracy Morgan (2009)
- Purpose: An Immigrant's Story with Wyclef Jean (2012)
- Crash and Burn with Artie Lange (2013)
- Play On: Now, Then, and Fleetwood Mac with Mick Fleetwood (2015)
- Wanna Bet?: A Degenerate Gambler's Guide to Living on the Edge with Artie Lange (2018)
- From Staircase to Stage: The Story of Raekwon and the Wu-Tang Clan with Raekwon (2021)
