= The Artie Lange Show =

- Genre: Sports; entertainment
- Starring: Artie Lange
- Country of origin: United States
- Original language: English
- No. of episodes: 538

Production
- Producer: Dan Falato
- Production location: New York City
- Running time: 3 hours
- Production company: DirecTV Sports Group (2011–2014)

Original release
- Release: October 3, 2011 – April 28, 2014

The Artie Lange Show was an American sports entertainment radio show hosted by comedian Artie Lange, airing from October 2011 to April 2014 on the Audience Network, DirecTV, SiriusXM Satellite Radio and several terrestrial radio stations by Premiere Radio Networks. It originally launched as The Nick & Artie Show with Lange co-hosting with comedian Nick Di Paolo until Di Paolo's departure in January 2013. The three-hour show aired live from New York City from Monday to Friday at 10:00 p.m EST. From September 7, 2012, the show aired live on the Audience Network on Fridays at 10:00 p.m. EST from Tuesday to Friday.

The featured commentary on sports and entertainment news, interviews with sports figures and celebrities, and listener phone calls. The show was available for live streaming and download as a podcast. On April 28, 2014, the show was cancelled. Lange announced it that day, the show's final broadcast.

== Personnel ==
- Artie Lange – Host
- Nick Di Paolo - Host (2011-2013)
- Jon Ritchie – Co-Host (2013-2014)
- Shane Elrod – Head of Content & Production
- Dan Falato – Producer
- Liz Canavan – Score Girl #1
- Marie Canavan – Score Girl #2
- Jack Pesin - Writer & Voiceover Artist
- Mike Bocchetti – Announcer

== Availability ==
The Artie Lange Show was available on the Audience Network channel 239 on DirecTV, SiriusXM Sports Zone (Channel 92), Extreme Talk on iHeartRadio, and terrestrial radio affiliates throughout the United States. It is streamed at the show's website, Stitcher Radio app on smartphones and websites of affiliates. It is available as a podcast. The following is a list of affiliates:

Terrestrial Affiliates
Market	Station	Frequency	Notes
Anchorage	KOAN	1080 AM	
Fort Myers-Naples	WRXK-FM	96.1 FM	
Miami-Fort Lauderdale	WINZ	940 AM	
West Palm Beach	WZZR	92.1 FM	
