= Crash and Burn (book) =

2013 memoir by Artie Lange

- Hadcover cover
- Author: Artie Lange; Anthony Bozza
- Language: English
- Subject: Personal memoirs
- Genre: Humor
- Publisher: Touchstone Books
- Publication date: October 29, 2013
- Publication place: United States
- Media type: Hardcover; Audiobook; Paperback
- Pages: 320
- ISBN: 978-1-4767-6511-2

Crash and Burn is a memoir by the American comedian Artie Lange. The book was published by Touchstone Books on October 29, 2013. The book has appeared on The New York Times Bestseller List.

== Background ==
In a September 2013, interview with The Tampa Tribune, Artie Lange spoke about the book, saying: "The new book is the most honest thing I've ever done in my life. I just had to look at it again with my lawyer and I barely could get through it. It's about the last four years, when I was in mental institutions, rehabs, hurting myself, being in the hospital. It just starts to show how a successful guy and self-made man has everything go down the toilet because of a drug habit. It's the only thing standing between him being multi-multimillionaire. But I'm off the drugs now. Now it's just eating."
