= Glasberg =

Glasberg or Glassberg is a Jewish surname originating from the German words glas (glass) and berg (mountain). Notable people with the surname include:

- Ben Glassberg (born 1994), British music conductor
- Gary Glasberg (1964/65–2016), American television writer and producer
- Irving Glassberg (1906–1958), Polish-American cinematographer
- Jeffrey Glassberg (born 1947), American biologist and author
- Lauren Glassberg (born 1970), American journalist
- Lisa Glasberg (born 1956), better known as Lisa G, is an American radio news personality
