= WVBR-FM =

Radio station in Ithaca, New York

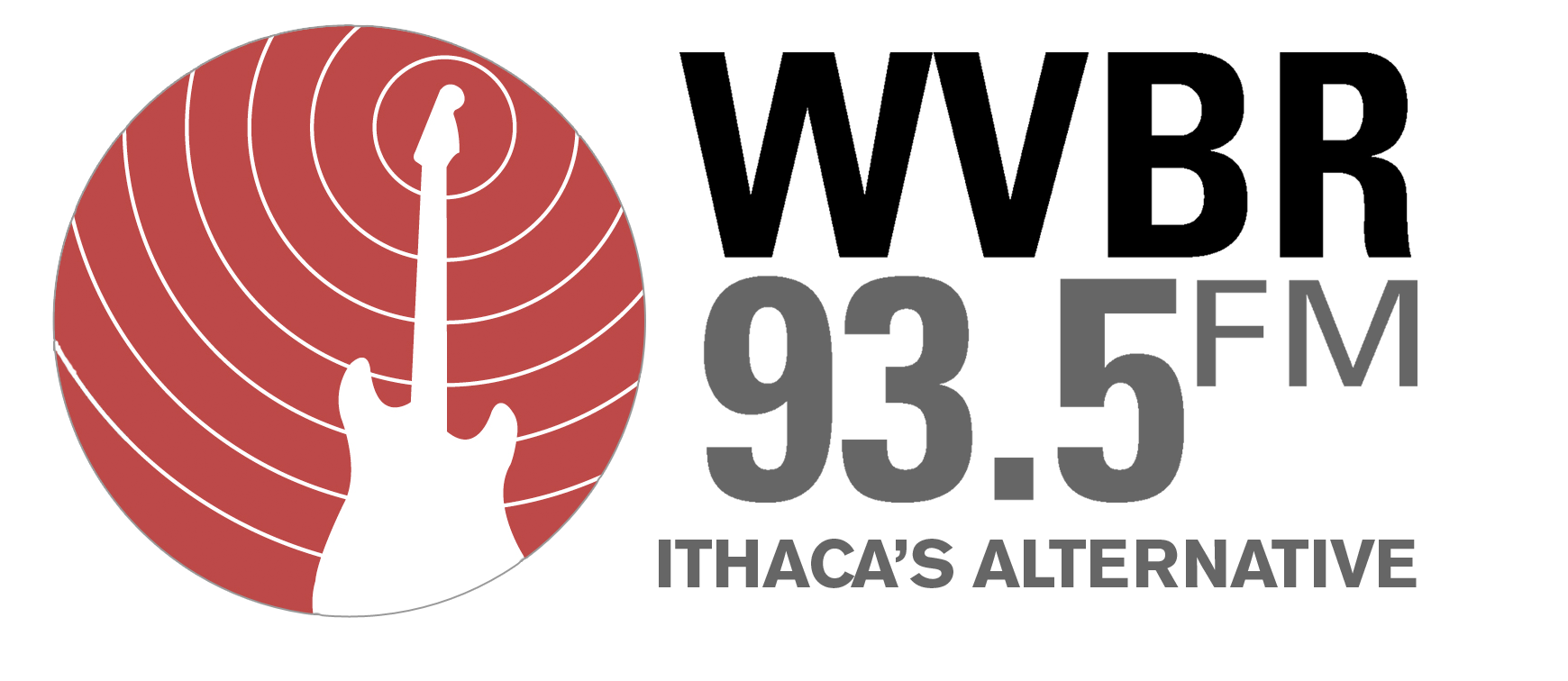
- Ithaca, New York; United States
- Broadcast area: Finger Lakes Region
- Frequency: 93.5 MHz

Programming
- Format: Alternative (weekdays); Talk and variety (weekends)

Ownership
- Owner: Cornell Media Guild, Inc.
- Sister stations: CornellRadio.net

History
- First air date: June 1958
- Call sign meaning: "Voice of the Big Red" (Nickname of Cornell University sports teams)

Technical information
- Licensing authority: FCC
- Facility ID: 13909
- Class: A
- ERP: 3,800 watts
- HAAT: 73 meters (240 ft)
- Transmitter coordinates: 42.42922°N 76.45081°W

Links
- Public license information: Public file; LMS
- Webcast: Listen live (via TuneIn)
- Website: wvbr.com

WVBR-FM (93.5 FM) is a commercial radio station licensed to Ithaca, New York, United States. Owned by the Cornell Media Guild, a non-profit organization, it is student-operated and volunteer-run, with an alternative rock format on weekdays with talk and variety programs on weekends. The station is supported by advertisements but it also seeks donations on the air and on its website. The studios and offices are on East Buffalo Street in the Collegetown district of Ithaca. WVBR-FM's transmitter is sited on Hungerford Hill in East Ithaca.

WVBR is a commercial radio station that it is owned, operated and managed by Cornell University students who comprise the non-profit Cornell Media Guild, Inc. (CMG). The station is ad-supported and independent of the university. WVBR and the Guild are a training ground for students interested in media and broadcasting, as well as a serious commercial competitor in the Ithaca radio market.

There are also community members, of all ages, who are involved with the station. Student and volunteer staff members are, for the most part, unpaid. Some staff earn commissions on time sales or are paid a stipend to help operate the station during the summer and other times when Cornell classes are not in session.

WVBR is very involved in the city of Ithaca and Tompkins County. The station features a "Community Calendar" segment twice daily, where non-profit organizations can send bulletins of their events to be read over the air during the morning and afternoon. WVBR also does remote broadcasts from locations including the Ithaca Farmer's Market, Ithaca-area concerts, and local businesses around town. WVBR also sponsors local charitable and cultural events.

WVBR purchased, remodeled and relocated to a new studio in Collegetown, located at 604 E. Buffalo Street. A ribbon-cutting event was held on March 15, 2014, where the new building was named the Olbermann-Corneliess Studios, after Keith Olbermann's father, Ted, and his close friend and alumnus, Glenn Corneliess. Prior to 2016, WVBR had a translator on 105.5 FM.

== History ==
=== Early 20th century ===
WVBR's history goes back to 1935 when the Cornell Radio Guild was formed (incorporated in 1941) as a Cornell student organization that produced radio programs that aired on WESG, the forerunner of WHCU 870 AM. In the early 1940s, the Guild started a network of its own low power AM "carrier-current" transmitters in the dormitories. For a time, the signal of those transmitters was powerful enough, and connected to enough of the regional power grid, that the signal was widely heard beyond campus.

A hoax broadcast in the early 1950s resulted in the FCC ordering the Guild to take steps to restrict the reach of the signal to the immediate campus area. At this point, CMG began a search for a suitable frequency on either AM or the newly emerging FM to conduct a genuine regional broadcast service. That search was successful in 1957, when a construction permit was issued by the FCC to allow CMG to build and operate an FM station, first at 101.7 MHz. Before broadcasts began, the specified operating frequency was changed to 93.5 MHz, and WVBR-FM has broadcast on that frequency ever since.

=== FM station ===
The FCC-licensed FM station signed on the air in June 1958. The WVBR call letters had already been in use for years on the Guild's AM "carrier-current" broadcasts, which could be received only on campus. The call sign originally stood for "Voice of the Big Red", referring to the Cornell Big Red athletic teams. However, the station de-emphasized that connection over the years as it carved out an identity independent of the university. Cornell's sports broadcasts were generally carried by WHCU 870 AM, a commercial station that Cornell owned for many years. But this has changed to a degree in recent years as WVBR has become the originating station for sponsored broadcasts of some major Cornell sports, including football, basketball and hockey.

In its early years, WVBR-FM's musical programming was mainly classical, while its AM carrier-current side carried popular music. WVBR-FM switched to a more mass-appeal format in 1968, billed and promoted as "The FM Revolution". The station expanded its audience, especially off campus, initially with a sound that blended hit music and album cuts. By the early to mid-1970s its format had evolved to progressive rock radio, similar to pioneering rock stations like WNEW-FM in New York City, WMMS in Cleveland, KSAN-FM in San Francisco, and nearby WCMF in Rochester. In later years the station's format evolved toward more tightly controlled playlists of the best-selling rock albums, mirroring the larger trend in FM radio programming influenced by national programmers like Lee Abrams and Kent Burkhart. It also became heavily involved in live music, promoting its own series of concerts at local venues like the Strand Theater, many of which were broadcast live.

=== Student protests and local economy ===
WVBR was affected by the Willard Straight Hall takeover of 1969, during which the building was occupied to advocate for the rights of Black students and against institutional racism. Cornell students briefly took over WVBR's airwaves. After 5 minutes, the transmission was then cut off by a WVBR engineer.

The station's commercial success peaked in the late 1970s and mid-1980s. It was adversely affected in the later 1980s and 1990s by several factors, including changes in the local economy. New York State increased its drinking age to 21, which was a blow to the radio station's nightclub and bar advertisers. Several new stations were brought into the Ithaca market via translators. And the radio industry went through deregulation, which resulted in most local competitors being taken over by a single chain owner.

A format change to contemporary hit radio took place in the early 1980s. The station was branded "FM93" and enjoyed some commercial success. This continued under then-Program Director Tom Poleman who went on to become the iHeartMedia National Programming Platforms President. His successor was Program Director and on-air personality Jessica Ettinger, who went onto Bloomberg Radio and Sirius XM Radio as a host and programmer. The latter two were under the leadership of station general manager (and now Coleman Insights President) Warren Kurtzman. After key personnel graduated from Cornell in the late 1980s, the new format eventually faded in audience appeal, especially with WVBR's traditional 18–34 core.

By 1989, the station moved back to album-oriented rock, and the format struggled.

=== 21st century ===
There were structural problems with the station's long-time studio building in the Collegetown neighborhood of Ithaca, which forced WVBR to relocate its studios and offices in 2000. This also proved to be both a financial and administrative burden for a time. The station's prospects improved over the following decade with a series of innovations, including the introduction of popular new youth-oriented VBR After Dark programming on weekday evenings and a special focus on music by local artists.

Among other ventures, CMG opened WVBR's sister station, CornellRadio.net, with free-form eclectic programming aimed specifically at student listeners and launched its own recording label, Electric Buffalo Records.

In 2013, the corporation changed its name from the Cornell Radio Guild, Inc. to the Cornell Media Guild, Inc., reflecting the widening scope of its activities and ambitions.

The station interviewed and photographed artists including John Legend, Saint Motel, Aly & AJ, and Gus Dapperton.

The departments of WVBR News and WVBR Sports were reborn and launched segments both on-air and in podcast form. Notable guests include Congressman James Clyburn and Ithaca mayor Svante Myrick.

In March 2019, WVBR launched its first bilingual radio show. In 2020, WVBR launched its online store, the WVBR Shop.

In 2025, WVBR and the Cornell Media Guild celebrated their 90th anniversary with a public music festival in the Ithaca Commons, alongside a station rebrand and a fundraising campaign that raised more than $100,000 for future operations.

=== Studio locations ===
In the 1940s, before it went on FM radio, the station first began broadcasting from studios at Willard Straight Hall, the university's main student union building. It later moved to a station-owned building at 227 Linden Avenue in Ithaca. It then relocated to a rented space near East Hill Plaza at 957-B Mitchell Street, nicknamed the Cow Palace because it was shared with the New York Holstein Association.

In 2014, the station purchased a new home closer to its student staff base in Collegetown at 604 E. Buffalo Street. The building was the former home of the Crossroads Community Center. It is now known as the Olbermann-Corneliess Studios, named after Ted Olbermann, the father of the station's biggest donor, Keith Olbermann, and Keith's close friend and fellow station alumnus, Glenn Corneliess. The main production studio, known as the George E. Beine '61 Studio A, houses the station's vinyl record library and honors alumni from the 1958–68 classical/jazz era of the station.

== Programming ==
=== Weekday program ===
Weekday airplay consists of alternative music played by student DJs. Since the COVID-19 pandemic, weekday shows are also hosted by WVBR alumni who DJ remotely via voicetracking.

There are several staples of WVBR programming. Tompkins County Trivia airs every weekday after the 8:00 a.m. newscast. In this segment, the DJ asks a trivia question on a topic local interest, with the first caller to correctly identify the answer winning a prize. Other regularly occurring daily weekday segments include Today in Rock History and The WVBR Concert Log. The 93-Second Sports Shot, an opinion piece covering sports, airs weekdays during the 6 p.m. newscast.

=== Weekend program ===
On weekends, WVBR features "Specialty Shows," which are non-alternative music shows played by non-student local DJs, with two exceptions: the student-run news program Talk of the Town and the student-run sports show Big Red Banter. The best known of the station's weekend programs is Bound For Glory, a long-running folk music showcase with a national reputation. Broadcast every Sunday night since 1967, the program is the longest-running live folk music broadcast in North America; it features a mix of recordings and (most weeks) live performances from Annabel Taylor Hall on Cornell's campus. Phil Shapiro has been the program's host since its inception.

Other long-running specialty programs on the station, begun in the 1960s, include Nonesuch (eclectic), The Salt Creek Show (country music), and Rockin' Remnants (oldies). Each has seen a succession of hosts and occasional changes in time slot.

== Prominent alumni ==
Many WVBR student staff members have gone on to significant careers in broadcasting, journalism, and related fields, including:

- William B. Briggs – sports and entertainment law expert; vice president for arbitration and litigation for the National Football League (NFL)
- Urie Bronfenbrenner – influential psychologist whose work led to the development of the Head Start early childhood program
- Joyce Brothers – psychologist, television personality, and columnist; "the mother of television psychology"
- Zachary W. Carter – corporation counsel for New York City; former United States Attorney for the Eastern District of New York
- G. Emerson Cole – radio and television producer; hosted longest-running big band radio program in history
- Edward D. Eddy – president of Chatham College and the University of Rhode Island
- Jessica Ettinger – anchor, 1010 WINS New York, voice of the New York City Subway on the 4, 5, and 6 trains
- Hal Fishman – Los Angeles television news anchor; longest-running news anchor in the history of American television; alleged inspiration for Kent Brockman on The Simpsons
- Tony Geiss – producer, screenwriter, and songwriter who wrote for Sesame Street for 28 years, including writing "Elmo's Song" and creating Abby Cadabby
- Will Gluck – film director, screenwriter, and producer, such as Easy A and Friends with Benefits
- Jordan Gremli – Head of Artist & Fan Development at Spotify
- Robert S. Harrison – CEO of Clinton Global Initiative; Cornell University Board of Trustees chairman
- Phil Karn – wireless data networking protocols & security engineer; inventor of Karn's Algorithm
- Lee Kranefuss – investment manager and entrepreneur
- Tim Minton – television journalist, media executive, founder of Zazoom Media Group
- John Moody – executive editor and executive vice president of Fox News, former CEO of NewsCore
- John Morales – award-winning meteorologist
- Keith Olbermann – sports and political commentator at ESPN, MSNBC, and Current TV; former host of Countdown with Keith Olbermann
- Bill Pidto – sports journalist; MSG Network anchor
- Tom Poleman – president of National Programming Platforms at iHeartMedia
- Christopher Reeve – film actor known for playing Superman
- Wallace A. Ross – advertising executive; founder of the Clio Awards
- Jon Rubinstein – senior vice president at Apple, Inc. and chairman of Palm, Inc.; instrumental in development of the iPod
- Todd Schnitt – morning host at WRBQ Tampa, former nationally syndicated conservative talk radio host and formerly of WOR New York.
- Melville Shavelson – Academy Award-winning screenwriter, director, and producer
- Ryan Silbert – award-winning filmmaker and producer
- Kate Snow – television correspondent for Dateline and Rock Center with Brian Williams; Good Morning America co-anchor
- Whit Watson – former SportsCenter anchor

== See also ==
- College radio
- List of college radio stations in the United States
