= Jessica Ettinger =

American broadcast journalist and non-practicing lawyer

Jessica Ettinger Gottesman
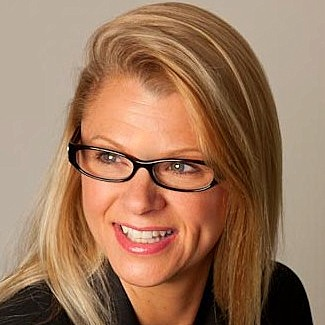
- Jessica Ettinger
- Born: Lansing, New York, United States
- Education: Cornell University; Fordham University School of Law
- Occupations: Broadcaster, Journalist
- Employer: NBC Universal
- Television: Bloomberg News; CNN; Nightly Business Report; TODAY; CNBC
- Awards: Gracie; Edward R. Murrow Awards (regional); AP Broadcast; New York Press Club

Jessica Ettinger Gottesman is an American broadcast journalist and non-practicing lawyer.

Ettinger joined CNBC to create on-demand audio content in 2017, pioneering digital services including podcasts and business news for phones, smart speakers, and other devices.

At SiriusXM she created and launched the TODAY Show radio channel, a hosted audio feed of the live TV show in 2014 in partnership with NBC News. She also served as the broadcast's cutaway anchor for three years, based at NBC's Studio 1A in Rockefeller Center.

Ettinger's recorded voice has been heard for nearly two decades in the New York City Subway, where it is used in automated announcements for the IRT Lexington Avenue Line (4, 5 and 6) trains.

Under the name Jessica Wade, she is one of the most-listened-to Female Country Radio talents in North America, and has been a personality on The Highway (Sirius XM)'s New Country channel 56 since 2004. As of Winter 2014, Sirius XM had 27 million subscribers.

== Early life and education ==
Ettinger is from upstate New York. She graduated with a B.S. from Cornell University and holds a Juris Doctor degree from Fordham University School of Law.

== Career ==
Several weeks after graduating from college and leaving the Program Director position at WVBR-FM, and an on-air position at Rochester's New Country WBEE-FM (92.5 MHz), Ettinger joined NBC to help change the music format of WYNY-FM, New York. She became an on-air personality and the Music Director for NBC's new "Country 97 FM."

As the Acting program director and music director at ABC's WPLJ-FM New York, she up-ended the top 40 radio industry by playing a song she heard by an unsigned artist that was unavailable in the United States. By creating a "mystery artist" promotion; Ettinger was able to put the song on the air without naming the artist. Listeners guessed for weeks. Eventually, Ettinger had her air talent announce that the song "Soldier of Love" was by former child star Donny Osmond, who came to the WPLJ studios for the live on-air reveal. Osmond was soon signed by Capitol Records, which released the song as a single and asked radio stations to copy Ettinger's promotion idea nationwide. "Soldier of Love" reached #2 on the Billboard Hot 100 in 1989 and Osmond credits Ettinger with re-launching his career by listening to the music and not pre-judging whether a song could be a hit based on the name or image of an artist.

Ettinger met with Michael Bloomberg and returned to journalism to help build New York's first all-business news radio station, Bloomberg Radio, joining Bloomberg, L.P. as an anchor for his newly acquired WBBR-AM.

In 1994, Ettinger helped launch Bloomberg Television and served as its weekday morning news anchor on the USA Network. She anchored cut-ins on Fox 5 New York, and on CNN. An on-air still photo of Ettinger is included in "Bloomberg By Bloomberg," Michael Bloomberg's 2001 autobiography. She spent nearly 12 years at Bloomberg News covering Wall Street and the financial markets, and also anchored live coverage of the September 11th terrorist attacks from Bloomberg's Midtown Manhattan studios. While at Bloomberg News, Ettinger earned her J.D. from Fordham University School of Law.

In 2005, Ettinger joined SiriusXM to assist in the creation and launch of Howard 100 News ahead of the arrival of Howard Stern, creating the first reality-parody news organization.

Ettinger originally joined CBS News as a radio anchor for 1010 WINS in 2004, becoming the first female to anchor at the top-of-the-hour in mornings as a regular fill-in. In 2012, Ettinger created and hosted the 1010 WINS "Open For Business" reports, a post-Hurricane Sandy series. As a digital music journalist, Ettinger also contributes to Billboard.com and Billboard.Biz.

== Awards ==
Ettinger has won a Gracie Award for her anchor work, AP and UPI Broadcast Sports awards for her coverage of the Yankees Road to the World Series and the New York Rangers Stanley Cup Win, and several regional Edward R. Murrow Awards. In 2015, Ettinger won a New York Press Club Award for Excellence in Journalism in the Entertainment News category for her work at NBC's TODAY, which was SiriusXM's first journalism award.
