= Jon Leiberman =

American television producer

- Education: Northwestern University
- Known for: Howard 100 News
- Website: jonleiberman.com

Jon Leiberman is an American reporter, television producer, and radio news personality.

== Career ==
Leiberman has been a reporter for WBFF in Baltimore and the newsman at WIYY 98 Rock radio in Baltimore. He has also worked as a reporter in New Mexico and Kansas.

In October 2004, Leiberman made headlines when he was fired by Sinclair Broadcast Group for publicly questioning the company's decision to air Stolen Honor: Wounds That Never Heal, a 40-minute film critical of Presidential candidate John Kerry's role in the anti-war movement during the Vietnam War. Leiberman claimed he was fired by Sinclair for criticizing the film in The Baltimore Sun as "biased political propaganda," and later told CNN: "The reason for my firing was that I relayed what they called proprietary information from an in-house meeting and I divulged it to the media, which is against company policy."

In 2006, Leiberman began reporting for America's Most Wanted, the long-running reality TV series hosted by John Walsh that profiles cases of wanted criminals. He reported mostly on cases from New York, such as Ralph "Bucky" Phillips, but he has also reported on the cases of Jose Campean, Ignacio Ramos and Gilmer Hernandez.

In August 2011, he joined Sirius XM Radio as a reporter for The Howard Stern Show and Stern's Howard 100 News department, replacing investigative reporter Steve Langford. In January 2013, Leiberman began to host Leiberman Live, a news radio show airing on Howard 101. He is also currently the host of TrueFacts with Jon Leiberman on cyberstationusa.com, as well as a regular contributor to HLN on crime issues.

Leiberman's book written with author Margaret McLean on Whitey Bulger, Whitey on Trial: Secrets, Corruption, and the Search for Truth, was released by Forge Books in February 2014.

In December 2024, Leiberman joined Qwoted, a media relations network, as the Global Head of Media, a newly-created position. His role was to strategically attract and retain media members. He left the position in June 2025.

== Personal life ==
Leiberman is a graduate of the Medill School of Journalism at Northwestern University.

In July 2014, Leiberman was admitted to the hospital with myocardial infarction. Lieberman presented to the emergency department with non-typical cardiac pain and was found to have 100% artery blockage during cardiac angiography. Following the insertion of a stent, Leiberman was released from the hospital and returned to work on The Howard Stern Show two weeks later.
