= Making Music (magazine) =

Bi-monthly lifestyle music magazine

- Categories: Music magazines
- Frequency: weekly online updates
- Circulation: 35,000
- Publisher: Bentley Hall, Inc.
- First issue: November/December 2004
- Country: United States
- Based in: Syracuse, New York
- Language: English
- Website: MakingMusicMag.com
- ISSN: 1552-2946

Making Music magazine was founded in 2004 as a bimonthly lifestyle music magazine devoted to the recreational musician and all instruments and genres of music. The publication's tagline is "Better Living Through Recreational Music Making."

The first issue debuted in November/December 2004. It was published six times per year until 2015 by Bentley Hall, Inc., located in the Armory Square district of Syracuse, New York. Making Music lives on as an online-only magazine dedicated to supporting a community of musicians of all levels.

Making Music magazine’s editor-in-chief, Antoinette Follett appeared on the Today show with Kathie Lee & Hoda presenting easy-to-learn instruments on January 21, 2014.

== Purpose ==
The magazine defines its purpose as: "Making Music magazine encourages recreational musicians to become more engaged in playing their instruments and to participate in the larger music making community."

== Featured celebrities and cover stories ==
Celebrity	Occupation
Jason Mraz	Professional singer, musician, guitarist
Alex Skolnick	Guitarist
Chad Smith	Drummer
Michael Feinstein	Singer, pianist, and music revivalist
Steve Martin	Actor and comedian
Victor Wooten	Bass player
Daniel Ho	Ukulele player
Lisa Loeb	Singer-songwriter
Liberty DeVitto	Drummer
Jim Brickman	Pianist
Béla Fleck	Banjo player
Lita Ford	Rock musician
Jake Shimabukuro	Ukulele player
David Cassidy	Pop singer
Paul Adelstein	Actor, Private Practice
Benjamin Utecht	Former NFL football player, Indianapolis Colts
Bernie Williams	Baseball player, New York Yankees
Jeff Daniels	Actor, Dumb and Dumber
Lisa Glasberg	Radio personality
David Pogue	Author
Robin Meade	News anchor, HLN
Mitch Albom	Author, The Five People You Meet in Heaven
Dave Barry	Author and columnist, The Miami Herald
Montel Williams	Talk show host, The Montel Williams Show
Michael and Kevin Bacon	Actors
Mike Huckabee	Politician
Harry Shearer	Actor and comedian
Ken Follett	Author
Dean Fearing	Chef, Food Network
John O'Hurley	Actor
Greg Grunberg	Actor, Heroes
Lester Holt	News anchor, NBC
Nicole Sullivan	Actress, The King of Queens
Bob and Mike Bryan	Professional tennis doubles champions

== Format ==
Each issue follows this general format:

- Feature stories: Interviews with famous and not-so-famous recreational musicians and organizations, with a focus on the lifestyle benefits of playing and sharing music.
- Tips & Techniques: Guides to music theory for beginners and intermediate musicians, maintenance tips, good practice techniques, and how to play with others.
- Health issues: Advice on keeping the body in shape, health tools, ergonomic issues, music and memory, etc.
- Product Spotlights: New product features, plus in-depth guides to buying instruments and accessories.

== Staff ==
Founding Publisher and Editor-in-Chief Antoinette Follett.
