= WVPX-TV =

Television station in Akron, Ohio

- Akron–Cleveland, Ohio; United States
- City: Akron, Ohio
- Channels: Digital: 22 (UHF), shared with WDLI-TV; Virtual: 23

Programming
- Affiliations: 23.1: Ion Television; for others, see § Subchannels

Ownership
- Owner: Inyo Broadcast Holdings (sale to the E. W. Scripps Company pending); (Inyo Broadcast Licenses LLC)
- Sister stations: WDLI-TV

History
- First air date: June 7, 1953
- Former call signs: WAKR-TV (1953–1986); WAKC-TV (1986–1998)
- Former channel numbers: Analog: 49 (UHF, 1953–1967), 23 (UHF, 1967–2009); Digital: 59 (UHF, until 2009), 23 (UHF, 2009–2019)
- Former affiliations: ABC (1953–1997); inTV (1997–1998)
- Call sign meaning: "Pax TV"

Technical information
- Licensing authority: FCC
- Facility ID: 70491
- ERP: 950 kW
- HAAT: 290.32 m (952 ft)
- Transmitter coordinates: 41°3′20″N 81°35′37″W

Links
- Public license information: Public file; LMS
- Website: iontelevision.com

WVPX-TV (channel 23) is a television station licensed to Akron, Ohio, United States, serving the Cleveland area as an affiliate of Ion Television. It is owned by Inyo Broadcast Holdings alongside Canton-licensed Bounce TV affiliate WDLI-TV (channel 17), which transmits using WVPX-TV's full-power spectrum via a channel sharing agreement. The two stations share transmitter facilities on Ohio SR 261 in Norton, Ohio.

This station was signed on by S. Bernard Berk's Summit Radio Corporation as WAKR-TV, the television extension of WAKR. WAKR-TV positioned itself with a focus primarily on Akron even as it also covered the Greater Cleveland television market. From their 1953 establishment until 1996, the station was one of two primary ABC affiliates within the Cleveland market, current primary affiliate WEWS-TV being the other. Denied what would have originally been a VHF license, WAKR-TV's competitiveness was negatively impacted throughout this era by financial shortfalls and continuous ratings issues, even with a move from channel 49 to channel 23 in 1967, and eventual market-wide carriage on cable systems. Becoming WAKC-TV in 1986 after WAKR was sold, the station remained in the hands of the Berk family until 1994, when it was sold to home-shopping broadcast chain ValueVision. Under ValueVision, the station retained local programming and its ABC affiliation. A subsequent sale to Paxson Communications resulted in all newscast production ceasing immediately upon consummation on February 28, 1996, and disaffiliation from ABC at year's end; these moves made Akron the largest city in Ohio without a traditional television network affiliate or commercial television newscast.

Renamed WVPX-TV, the station became owned and operated for Paxson's Pax TV network on August 31, 1998. When Paxson filed an application to replace WVPX's transmitter with one capable for high-definition television, Akron City Council demanded Paxson restore local news on the station or invest in a television news service for the city; the permit was granted after Paxson made a one-time payment to the city. As part of a larger partnership between Paxson and minority investor NBC, WKYC owner Gannett took over WVPX's operations in 2001 and began producing a daily half-hour Akron newscast. When NBC withdrew their involvement in Paxson in 2005, the newscast was moved to local cable and Paxson (later renamed Ion Media) resumed operating WVPX. Ion Media was sold to WEWS owner E. W. Scripps Company in 2021, resulting in WVPX and WDLI being spun off to Inyo Broadcast Holdings.

== WAKR-TV (1953–1986) ==
=== Frozen out of VHF ===
In early December 1947, Summit Radio Corporation, the family-owned business of S. Bernard Berk and owners of WAKR (1590 AM) and WAKR-FM (97.5)—and Allen Simmons, owner of radio station WADC (1350 AM)—filed competing applications with the Federal Communications Commission (FCC) for what was initially seen as the lone television channel assigned to Akron, originally intended as a VHF license on channel 11. The applications were filed at the same time WEWS-TV had commenced operations as the first television station in Ohio. Both applications remained under review and went before a commission hearing on July 15, 1948, and WAKR had gone so far as to make a purchase order for VHF transmitting equipment from RCA, before the FCC implemented a freeze on any additional television licenses that September 30, while it studied the possibility of adding additional channels via the UHF band.

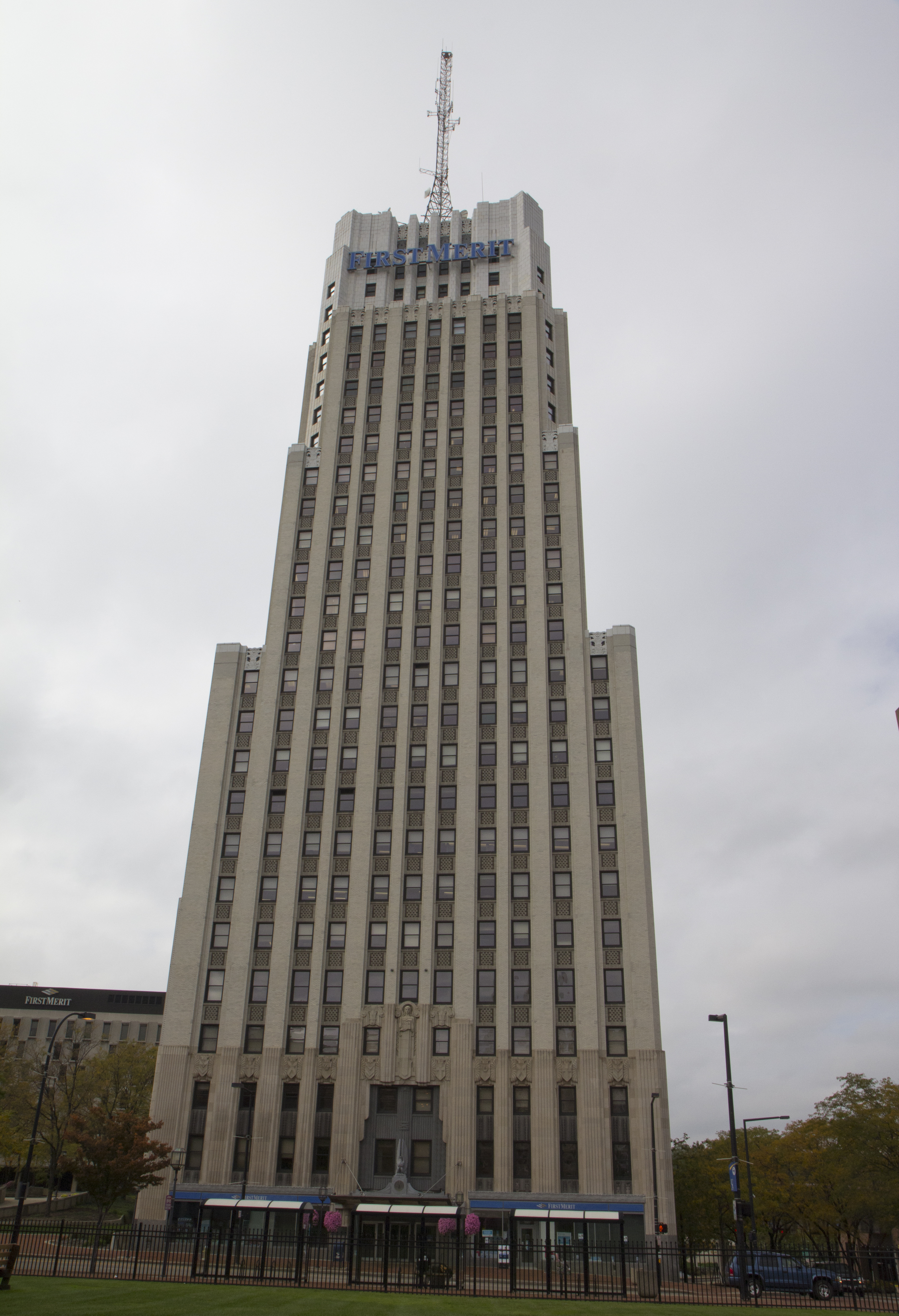
WAKR-TV's original 120-foot (37 m) transmitter mast was on the roof of the current Huntington Tower (pictured in 2012).

After the release of the FCC's Sixth Report and Order lifted the freeze in 1952, the Commission reassigned the proposed Akron license from a VHF signal to one of two potential UHF signals, as channel 11 was no longer available in order to protect what would become WTOL in Toledo and WIIC-TV (now WPXI) in Pittsburgh. Moreover, the Commission collapsed both Akron and Canton into the Cleveland market and now limited the combined market to three existing VHF signals—channels 3, 5 and 8 (changed from 4, 5 and 9). Summit Radio was awarded the permit for WAKR-TV on channel 49 by September 4, 1952; a coin flip determined the winning bid between Summit and WADC as the other frequency available, channel 65, was not considered operable at the time.

With WAKR already housed at the First Central Tower in the city's downtown, a UHF mast was affixed to the top of the building to much fanfare, with onlookers watching from the ground level during the multi-day process, and pictures of the tower installation published on the front page of the Akron Beacon Journal several times. Test transmissions began on June 7, 1953, that consisted solely of a test pattern card featuring the call sign and an illustration of the tower, while appliance stores in the city ran advertisements promoting either new television sets or converter equipment to upgrade existing sets—concurrently promoting the station's upcoming launch. These signal tests continued on a regular set schedule until WAKR-TV formally signed on the air on July 19, 1953.

In contrast to the tower construction, the studio operations at the First Central Tower were temporary, as Summit Radio had acquired the former Copley Theatre as a permanent home for the WAKR stations; the building operated as a theater between March 1947 and October 1952. As part of the renovations of the theater, a second floor was added solely for office space, while one of the two TV studios featured a large steel turntable floor for set changing purposes; at the time, it was the only such turntable custom-built for a television studio. S. Bernard Berk's wife, Viola Berk, drafted the architectural plans for the new studios, scrapping plans drawn by a professional architect as being "pretty, but not practical". Formally opened that December as the "WAKR Television Center", the complex boasted an ultra-modern front lobby and interior designed by Viola Berk, and a second floor viewing room with windows where advertisers could watch programs being produced in the studios below.

=== Focused on Akron ===
You at WAKR-TV must always realize, that the people will be greatly influenced by your programs... I'm sure you will realize your duties to these people.

— The Rev. C. Willard Fetter, on WAKR-TV's opening program

WAKR-TV became an ABC-TV affiliate when it signed on, owing to WAKR radio's existing ABC Radio affiliation; Berk attributed the recent merger with United Paramount Theaters to create American Broadcasting-Paramount Theatres as a determining factor for the affiliation. At the same time, ABC-TV was in an aggressive push to sign up as many affiliates as possible to compensate for their lack of competitiveness against CBS-TV, NBC-TV and DuMont. When WAKR-TV launched, ABC-TV had only secondary affiliations in the Cleveland market on both WXEL (channel 9; later channel 8), then a primary DuMont affiliate, and WEWS-TV (channel 5), then a primary CBS-TV affiliate. WXEL attained the market's CBS affiliation on March 1, 1955, resulting in WEWS becoming a primary ABC-TV affiliate alongside WAKR-TV.

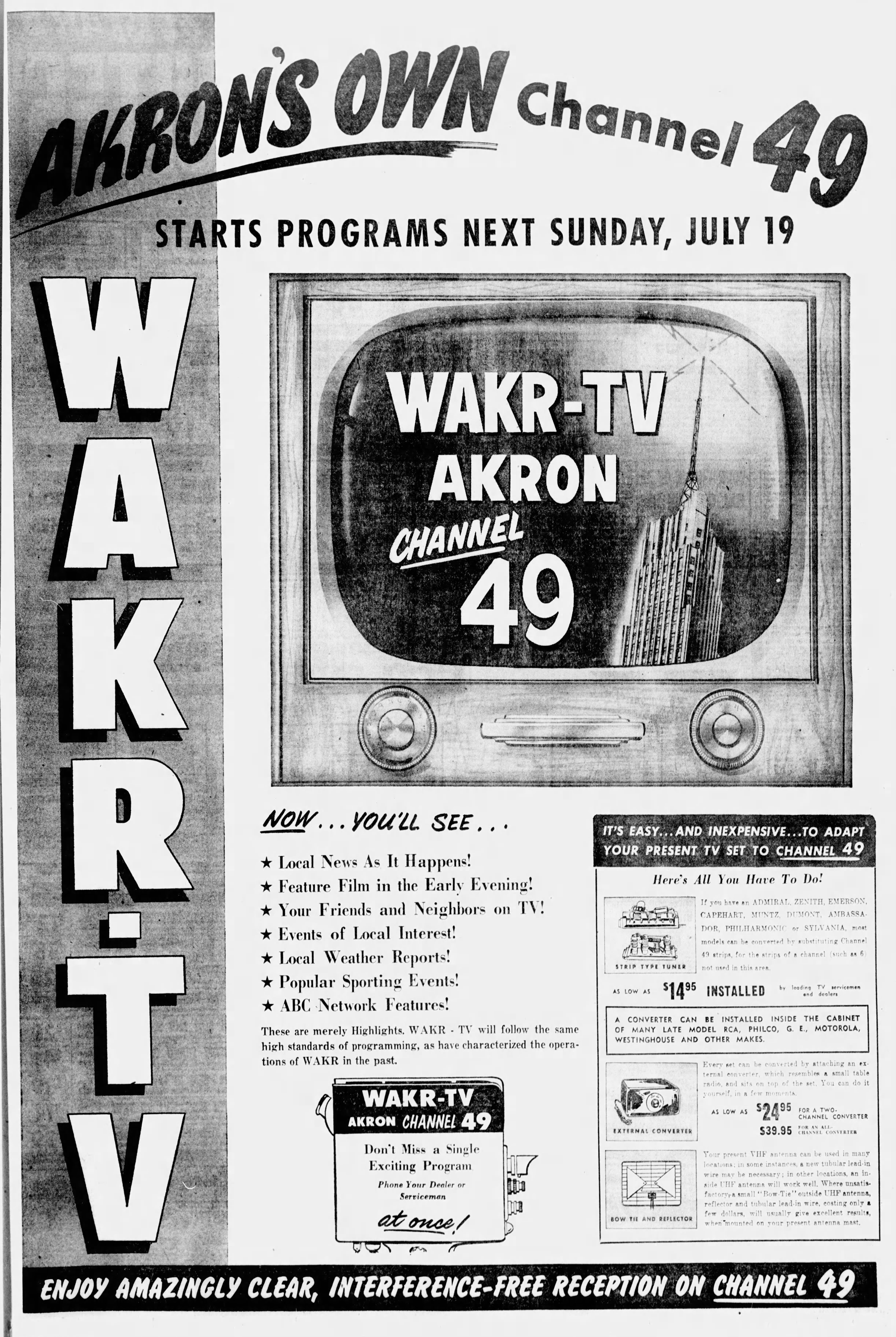
Symbolic of the many issues the station would face, a full-page ad for WAKR-TV's launch contained UHF converter installation instructions.

Due to both the station's permanent studios still being under construction and ABC not yet programming on a full-time basis, WAKR-TV acquired a film package consisting of high-profile Republic Pictures and United Artists releases to fill airtime via a nightly "double-feature" showcase. WAKR-TV itself was able to join ABC officially on September 15, 1953, after Ohio Bell Telephone Company technicians completed the installation of receivers for the Bell System-operated relay network. An additional film package of 20th Century-Fox, Columbia Pictures and David O. Selznick releases was purchased by the station in 1956 and utilized in afternoons and prime time as an early form of counterprogramming against television network fare; owing to WAKR-TV's flexible schedule, these movies usually ran in complete form, with minimal edits for time. Milton F. Komito, a director for WMAL-TV in Washington, D.C., who also had produced and directed programs on NBC-TV and ABC-TV, was hired to direct all local productions for the station. Komito left in 1955 for a management role at WTAP-TV in Parkersburg, West Virginia, eventually returning to the WAKR stations in 1963 as sales manager. Robert I. Bostian, who replaced Komito as production director, was promoted to program director two months after having joined; Bostian would remain a part of WAKR-TV and Summit Radio management through the late 1980s as station vice president and once summed up the station's purpose by saying, "Our local programming is geared to giving Akron what it wants—news, advertising, announcements and local shows all about Akron."

From the beginning, WAKR-TV eschewed the Cleveland market proper in favor of Akron and Canton, boasting the only television newscast that focused specifically on both cities, sharing resources with WAKR, which had earned the distinction of being one of the first radio stations in the United States to house an active news department at its 1940 establishment. WAKR personalities began appearing on the television side, including long-time radio staffers Jack Fitzgibbons, Bill Murphy and Bob Wylie; indeed, the first live programs over WAKR-TV were a local newscast anchored by Bill Murphy, followed by a Bob Wylie-headlined sportscast. Jack Fitzgibbons would become the station's lead anchorman and news director alongside his daily radio news reports, positions he held until leaving broadcasting in 1969 to become Akron's deputy mayor. Future progressive rock radio personality Scott Muni, who was WAKR's evening host from 1956 to 1958, presented the nightly weather report at 6:55 p.m. on WAKR-TV featuring a unique setup allowing him to write the forecast on a pane of glass, then reversed by a mirrored camera; this would directly lead in to his radio program that started at 7:15 p.m. Long-time WAKR midday host Jack Ryan—despite having no background in meteorology—later served as WAKR-TV's lead weatherman throughout the 1960s, 1970s and early 1980s.

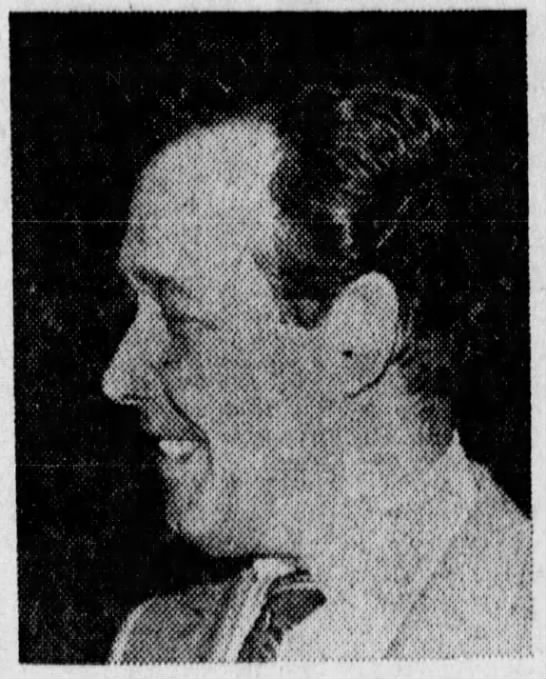
Jack Fitzgibbons

Live events and sports coverage heard on WAKR would find itself shown on WAKR-TV. Six days after the station's launch, the station's first live telecast of an outdoor event occurred with coverage of Akron's Sesquicentennial Parade. The following week, the station broadcast film of the 1953 Beacon Journal Soap Box Derby and All-American Finals in prime time, with Bob Wylie providing play-by-play. Wylie in particular soon became known as the "Voice of the Zips", thanks to the station's broadcasts of Akron Zips football and basketball. WAKR-TV also touted itself as having broken news of the armistice agreement which formally suspended the Korean War well before any of the Cleveland market stations reported the news. Another alliance existed with the Akron Beacon Journal, as publisher Knight Newspapers—a forerunner of Knight Ridder—held a minority stake in Summit Radio from 1946 to 1977.

=== Local music, variety and children's shows ===
In addition to local news and sports, the station tried producing different programs characteristic of the era, continuing to utilize talent from the radio station. WAKR morning host Torey Southwick became the emcee of an early-evening children's television program on WAKR-TV titled The Hinky-Dinks, which debuted on December 14, 1953, as part of an expansion of the station's broadcast day. Placing an emphasis on participation among the youngsters in the studio audience, The Hinky-Dinks featured puppetry, pet parades, birthday parties and a circus act on Fridays, in addition to Santa Claus reading letters throughout the month of December. Eventually with ABC-TV's The Mickey Mouse Club as a lead-in, the program ended on December 16, 1955, when Southwick left Akron to host mornings at KMBC (980 AM) in Kansas City, Missouri; Southwick later presided over similar children's shows in Kansas City on KMBC-TV and KCIT-TV.

TV was much more exciting back then—the urgency of it, not knowing what was going to happen... it was live. If you made mistakes, you made mistakes.

— "Professor Jack" Bennett

A weekly local music and dance program titled The Hop aired on the station beginning in 1957 with a succession of WAKR air talent as host; this included Scott Muni, Jack Ryan and Rick (Hudak) Shaw. Originally a cross-promotional vehicle for WAKR's Top 40 format, The Hop became popular with teenage viewers as a local version of American Bandstand, which WAKR-TV also carried; dropped from the schedule at the end of 1961, it was temporarily revived in 1962 thanks to viewer demand. WAKR-TV also launched Akron Tonight—a late-evening variety show featuring local musical acts and Akron news headlines—on March 30, 1959; the show was briefly reworked the following February into a weekly program presented by WAKR's Charlie Greer. Greer had previously hosted a limited-run dance program devoted to big band music over WAKR-TV in 1958. One of the more successful local shows on WAKR-TV was another early-evening children's television program hosted by Jack Boigegrain (known on air as Jack Bennett) under the "Professor Jack" persona, which debuted on February 25, 1963. Bennett also presented weather reports in the late evenings, billed as the "Weather Profit". The program ended on April 1, 1966, after Bennett was denied a raise by station management; this followed a potential hiring by KYW-TV as a replacement for Linn Sheldon falling through due to a subsequent court-ordered ownership change.

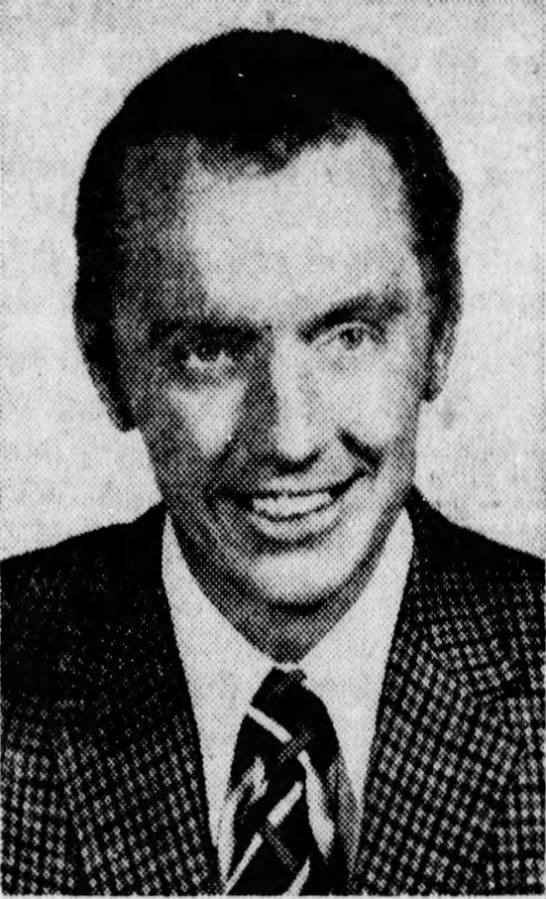
Jerry Healey

Starting with the 1963–64 television season, WAKR-TV began carrying the entire ABC-TV lineup in pattern with occasional deviations for high school sports and Akron Zips sports coverage; this followed a change in FCC policy that also allowed affiliates to preempt or reschedule network shows at their discretion. Following this, much of the station's local productions were curtailed, with one of the last local prime time shows being Bob Lee Playhouse, a limited-run weekly variety show in the spring of 1963 hosted by WAKR's Bob Lee. Carrying the ABC lineup in pattern also resulted in WAKR-TV's broadcast schedule largely mirroring fellow ABC primary affiliate WEWS's schedule, although WEWS more freely preempted or rescheduled weaker offerings from the network. While WEWS had the larger measured audience by a commanding margin throughout, both stations would continue to fight for each other's viewership. One last attempt at a local variety/talk show occurred in the early 1970s with WAKR morning personality and WAKR-TV evening sportscaster Jerry Healey as host. The Jerry Healey Show launched on November 27, 1972, at 11 a.m. weekdays and aired until Healey left the stations at the end of 1973; Healey then hosted TGIF Party, a weekly WAKR-TV program on Friday nights throughout the summer of 1974.

=== Technical issues and move to channel 23 ===
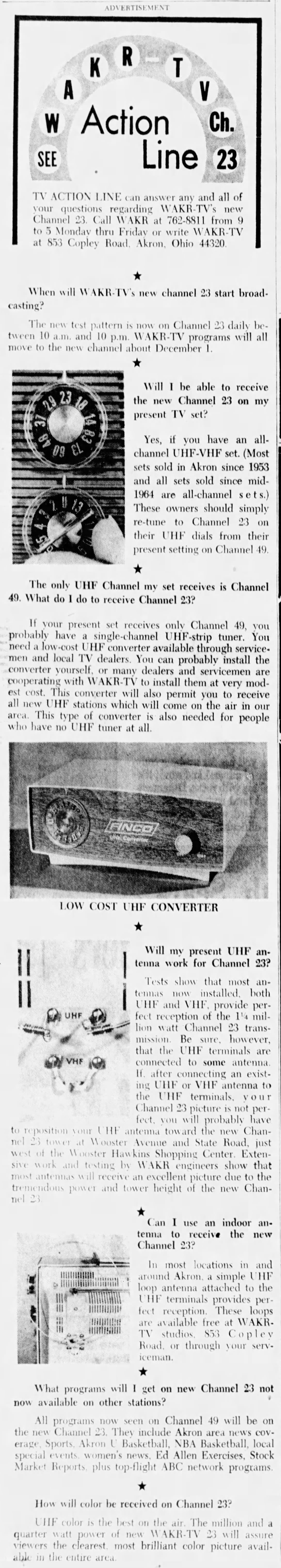
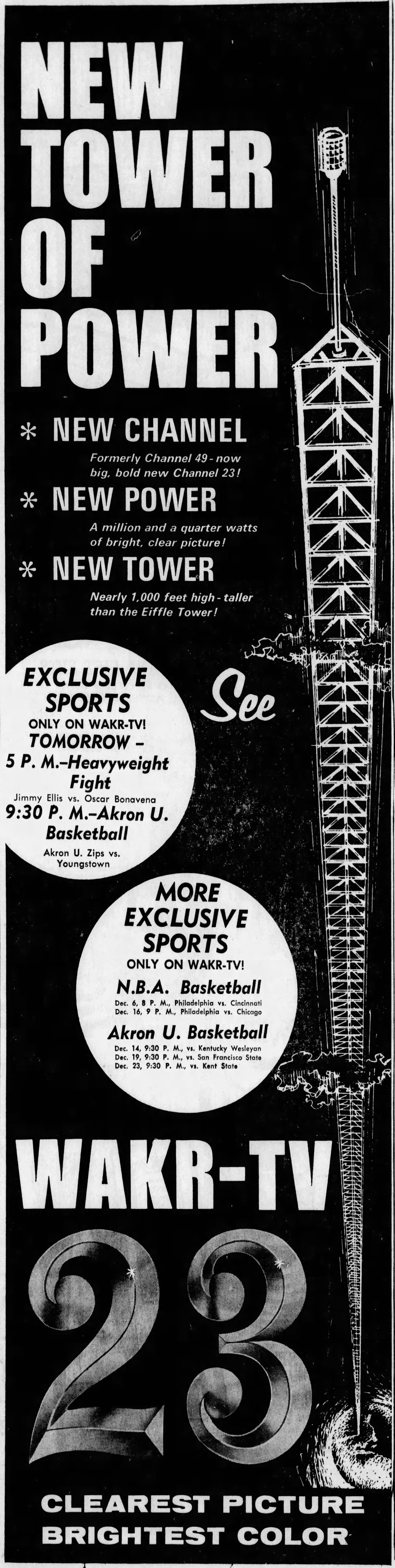
Two newspaper ads from November 1967 promoting WAKR-TV's move from channel 49 to 23.

In promoting the station's sign-on, UHF signals were touted as not being any different from VHF signals in a technical sense, and S. Bernard Berk provided optimistic words that "about 99.44/100% of the Akron area will receive (WAKR-TV) without difficulty." Such sentiment was supported by a study one month after the station launched, showing almost one-third of television sets in the city had been converted to receive UHF, figures much higher than expected for a market serviced by VHF channels. Despite this initial optimism, the station immediately ran into issues with poor reception, transmission issues relating to inclement weather conditions, and a lack of adequate UHF channel tuners.

Even with passage of the All-Channel Receiver Act, these problems would not be totally resolved until Summit Radio successfully petitioned the FCC to amend channel allocations between Canton and Akron, allowing WAKR-TV to move to a reassigned channel 23 allocation at higher power. As part of the petition, Summit Radio disclosed that WAKR-TV had amassed a "seven-figure" operating deficit dating back to 1953. This was not exactly new: in a 1961 request to the FCC that Akron should be at the "highest priority" for future potential VHF allocations, Summit Radio declared that channel 49 had "suffered very substantial operating losses" from the beginning. The change from channels 49 to 23 took place on December 1, 1967. Despite the move, WAKR-TV still lost significant amounts of money for the majority of its existence, relying on profits from WAKR to remain solvent. The former channel 49 allocation would be reassigned for educational use as PBS member station WEAO, using the same transmitter equipment on top of the First Central Tower at their launch.

The changes at WAKR-TV were not just technical: founder S. Bernard Berk died on July 11, 1966, at age 69. His widow Viola Berk initially assumed control over Summit Radio then transferred control over in 1970 to son Roger G. Berk, who had been actively involved with the TV station since its establishment.

=== Geographical disadvantages ===
While WAKR thrived throughout the 1970s and 1980s, WAKR-TV continued to struggle. Even with the move to channel 23, the Akron and Cleveland markets were collapsed into one, forcing the station to operate in the shadows of the three high-profile VHF stations in the Cleveland market. As one of two ABC affiliates broadcasting in the same market, WAKR-TV continued to clear the network's lineup in pattern with next to no deviations. Most notably, this included running Good Morning America in its entirety from the program's 1975 launch; WEWS did not carry GMA until 1978, and until September 1994 only aired the first hour, opting out at 8 a.m. for The Morning Exchange. At the same time, the carriage of ABC's lineup in its entirety was occasionally seen as a liability for channel 23 whenever WEWS opted to preempt lower-rated or weaker programming. WAKR-TV, however, did have success carrying a steady amount of paid local and national religious programming, including The 700 Club, which was added to the schedule in 1975. By 1979, the station aired religious fare for 32 hours every week, Roger G. Berk having chalked it up to viewer demand.

You have to marvel at Fred (Anthony), keeping spirits up down there in the newsroom, with them not being rated... it's an ego thing. He walks down the street, and people recognize him. 'Hey, Fred,' they say. Ever been out to lunch with him? That ego boost, that recognition, is what keeps the team going. It's sheer guts.

— Robert Bostian

WAKR-TV's audience was often outranked by WEWS in Arbitron and Nielsen ratings diary reports, even in Summit County. Arbitron estimated in 1976 that one percent of all television sets in Summit County were tuned in to the station's 6 p.m. news. By 1991, the ratings service put the estimate at 3 percent for channel 23's 6 p.m. news, and 1 percent for their 11 p.m. news. Station management and ownership were frequently critical of how the surveys were set up, with Roger G. Berk stating that Arbitron never had given the station a fair share, while WAKR-TV never formally subscribed to the service, preventing Arbitron from more intently measuring the county; Roger's son Roger G. Berk Jr. would refer to the ratings as "statistically invalid." Station manager Robert Bostian once raised the possibility of Akron viewers confusing WEWS for WAKR-TV based on informal phone surveys, and also claimed that ratings sampling procedures underestimated the station's overall audience; these allegations would persist into the 1990s.

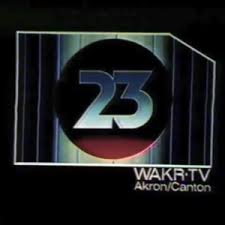
1982-83 station identification slide for WAKR-TV

A legitimate geographical disadvantage existed for the station. Summit County accounted for 14 percent of the Cleveland area of dominant influence (ADI)—as defined by Arbitron in 1991—and Summit County and the surrounding four counties accounted for one-third of the Cleveland ADI. Later analysis by Beacon Journal columnist Bob Dyer suggested that the newspaper's five-county circulation area would have resulted in the 50th biggest television market in the country, and the Akron metropolitan statistical area itself could have been the 100th largest television market, on par with El Paso and Savannah's MSAs. The ratings issues for channel 23, in turn, were reflected in advertising rates for the newscasts that were a fraction of what Cleveland stations would charge for. In 1976, a typical commercial spot on channel 23 only cost $150 for an advertiser compared to $300 for the same spot load on a Cleveland station; by the mid-1990s, channel 23 charged $200 while the Cleveland stations charged anywhere between $1,500 to $2,000. Management referred to the revenue disparity that resulted as a "Catch-23," preventing the station from acquiring any high-profile syndicated programming and having to resort to less-desirable off-network reruns like McHale's Navy and I Dream of Jeannie.

The station successfully fought to be excluded from market limitations for syndicated programming in 1974 for two years, and after cable television was introduced to the Akron market in 1974, WAKR-TV was placed at the channel 4 position by Warner Cable, a move later attributed for helping the station turn a profit in 1977. When a report came out in late 1977 that FCC chairman Charles D. Ferris was reconsidering cable television network nonduplication rules if a significantly viewed station were to seek an exemption from blackouts, Roger G. Berk responded with a letter of concern, disclosing that Summit/Group One had invested more than $2 million into WAKR-TV and suffered losses of over $5 million. As the station approached its 25th anniversary in 1978, Robert Bostian told the Beacon Journal that the station would have ceased operations early on had the Berks not absorbed a significant amount of said losses.

=== Becoming a training ground ===
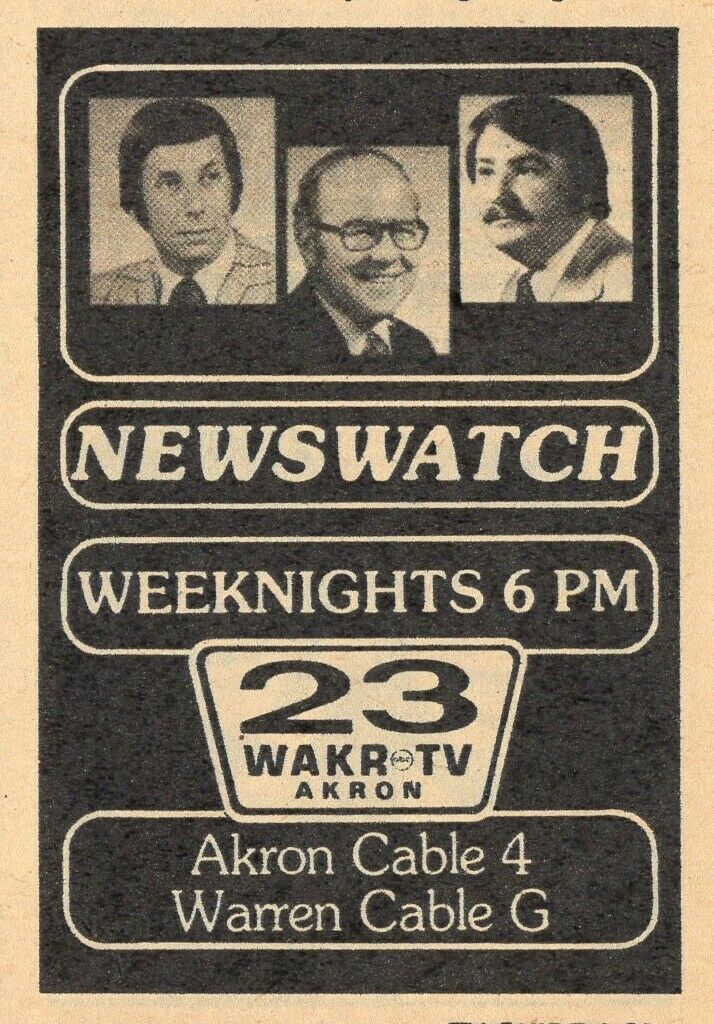
Late 1970s print ad for WAKR-TV Newswatch with Fred Anthony, Jack Ryan, and Frank DeMarco

Even with the numerous limitations facing the station, local newscast production remained consistent. Fred Anthony joined WAKR as a reporter in 1969, then became news director for both the radio and television stations, and lead anchor for WAKR-TV's 6 p.m. newscast. The station won the 1973 Ohio Associated Press award for best regularly scheduled news program, with Anthony receiving credit for helping instill "a renewed sense of pride" among the staffers. WAKR-TV was able to add an 11 p.m. newscast on September 20, 1976, and while Anthony gradually left his on-air position, he remained active in channel 23's operations into the mid-1980s and at WAKR until 1992. Under Anthony, the news department attained a reputation for hard work and scrappiness, competing against the Cleveland stations with a smaller staff, fewer resources and sometimes equipment shortages; at one point, the news department only had one camera capable of recording sound. Such shortages were not unique. The station ceased telecasting Akron Zips basketball games after the 1968–69 season when their remote unit used for the games—which only functioned in black-and-white—was donated to the university, and a replacement color remote unit was cost-prohibitive.

It was almost like we're sort of in it together ... working for good video [for an audition tape] instead of money.

— Mark Nolan

Similar to the reputation WAKR developed in the 1940s and 1950s as a "stepping stone" for future famous radio and television announcers, WAKR-TV became a training ground for future broadcasters. Long-time anchorman Ted Henry began his career as a reporter for both WAKR and WAKR-TV in 1965, as did veteran Cleveland news anchor and reporter Dick Russ in 1976. Future CNN anchor Carol Costello, a Minerva native, got her start at the WAKR stations in 1984 as a reporter, covering the Akron police beat and multiple court trials. Sportscaster Jeff Phelps began his broadcast career in 1981 co-hosting a weekly program with Kent State Golden Flashes football coach Ed Chlebek on WAKR-TV, in addition to being a color commentator for Kent State football broadcasts on WAKR. Denny Schreiner was WAKR and WAKR-TV's sports director prior to joining ESPN as lead play-by-play voice for their PBA Tour coverage. Future WKYC meteorologist Mark Nolan and future WEWS chief meteorologist Mark Johnson worked together at the station, with Johnson training Nolan. Eventual lead anchor and news director Mark Williamson started his tenure with channel 23 in 1979; one of the first major stories he covered while doing helicopter-based traffic reports for the WAKR stations was the August 2, 1979, plane crash that killed Thurman Munson.

One bright spot for the TV station came when WAKR personality Billy Soule became a video jockey on WAKR-TV in 1984, first hosting 23 Nite Videos, a Saturday night music video program; this show eventually became 23 Music Magazine, a daily program that aired both in late afternoons via tape and was broadcast live in the prime time access hour of 7 p.m., itself compensating for the station's continued inability to acquire syndicated programming. The weeknight program ended in early 1989, but Soule continued hosting 23 Nite Videos on weekend overnights into the following decade, and won the 1993 Billboard Music Video Award for best pop/adult contemporary regional video program. A screenshot taken from a promo for 23 Music Magazine would later be used at the beginning and end of a music video for The Black Keys' 2019 single "Lo/Hi" in an apparent tribute to the show.

== WAKC-TV (1986–1998) ==
=== Separated from radio ===
You just deliver the news. And you don't tell people how to think. You don't tell them it's an 'awful' murder. Yeah, it's awful that the kid got run over by the steamroller... we don't ask his mother, 'How do you feel?' I don't do that because you know how she feels, for crissakes.

— Mark Williamson

Summit Radio sold off WAKR, WONE-FM, and their radio stations in Dayton, Dallas and Denver—held under the "Group One Broadcasting" subsidiary—to DKM Broadcasting for approximately $60–65 million on July 15, 1986. Negotiations between Summit and DKM had been underway for six months prior, and was later attributed as a deal made at the height of the mid-late 1980s junk bond frenzy. WAKR-TV was retained by the Berk family and placed under the "Group One" subsidiary, while Roger G. Berk vowed to take Group One into the field of television production and consulting with their Creative Technologies, Inc. firm. Roger G. Berk would retire in 1988 and was succeeded by his son, Roger G. Berk Jr. Summit Radio had previously filed a trademark for WAKR (since expired) that was transferred to DKM, resulting in WAKR-TV changing its call sign to WAKC-TV that November 3; Roger Berk Jr. chose the calls to allude to the previous identity and to recognize "Akron/Canton" as their area of influence.

The terms of the radio station sale called for WAKR and WONE-FM to be moved out of the Copley Road studios, as Summit/Group One retained ownership of the building, both radio stations left the following year. A co-op agreement was also established between the radio stations and WAKC; one WAKR reporter was notably fired due to his displeasure over having to record a video segment for a public affairs program jointly aired on both radio and television. WAKR and WAKC also continued co-production of Civic Forum of the Air in coordination with the Jewish Community Center of Akron; this weekly public affairs program, which aired on Sunday mornings on WAKC throughout this time, debuted on both radio and television on June 4, 1961, and remains on the WAKR schedule to the present day as Forum 360. Staff were eventually separated, however. Tim Daugherty—who had been hired by Summit/Group One as part of WONE-FM's initial airstaff following its conversion from WAEZ on January 1, 1985—was retained by WAKC as their lead weatherman, despite minimal on-camera experience and, like Jack Ryan before him, no meteorological background. Meanwhile, Carol Costello briefly stayed with the radio stations after WAKC did not offer her a substantial on-air position, ultimately leaving the market altogether.

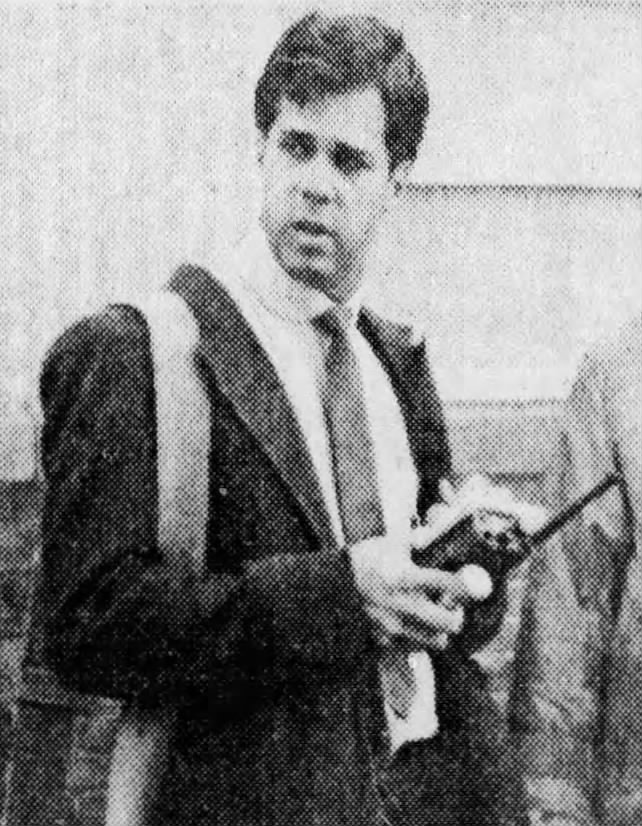
Jim Kambrich

While the Berks had initially invested the profits from the radio station divestitures into WAKC, the economic and financial struggles which had impacted the station throughout its existence never improved. WAKC attracted some negative attention for pre-recording their 11 p.m. newscast earlier in the evenings as a cost-saving measure, but that was reversed by 1990. The newscast production never evolved from its "no-frills" approach to journalism and began to be seen as an anachronism compared to flashy graphics, "happy talk" and tabloid journalism elements seen on the Cleveland stations, all of which regularly beat WAKC in the ratings in the Akron area by sizable margins. Some investments had been made, including teleprompters for the studio cameras and an electronic weather map system, but these had already been put into use by the Cleveland stations years earlier. A June 17, 1991, incident later recounted in the Akron Beacon Journal detailed anchor Jim Kambrich—who himself would serve as an anchor at WNYT in Albany, New York, from 1994 to 2020—concluding his 11 p.m. newscast on set, only to find a reporter and two interns in the newsroom instead watching WJW's newscast, which focused on lead anchor Robin Swoboda's departure from that station.

=== ValueVision ownership ===
In an era when more and more local broadcasters are worshiping at the Shrine of the Tabloid ... the Berk family and its news managers usually have erred on the side of caution. Far more often than not, they have been responsible, conscientious journalists. It is sad to see yet another local, family-owned broadcasting outlet gobbled up by a faceless, out-of-state conglomerate.

— Bob Dyer

On November 20, 1993, the Akron Beacon Journal reported that Summit/Group One was in talks to sell off WAKC to a then-undisclosed home shopping network. Three days later, Eden Prairie, Minnesota-based ValueVision announced their $6 million purchase of the station; the deal ended 40 years of continuous ownership by the Berk family. As ValueVision was a company specializing in home shopping programming and infomercials, the sale immediately raised concerns in local media that WAKC would drop their ABC affiliation and potentially cancel its newscasts; prior to the sale, three newsroom staffers told the Beacon Journal "everyone in the newsroom has been making tapes" for other prospective employers. After the sale was announced, ValueVision made a public pledge to keep and expand WAKC's news department, while an ABC affiliate representative said they were not notified of the sale beyond existing newspaper articles and that no effort had been made to communicate with them. Roger G. Berk Jr. took public exception to the speculation over WAKC's future, saying that ValueVision would be able to retain a news operation because it would own the station, as opposed to affiliates in other markets that had different owners. In addition, city councils in Akron and Barberton approved public resolutions that opposed the sale.

By mid-December, two ValueVision representatives visited the station and made multiple pledges to the staff, including no reduction in newscast output, no layoffs, and that WAKC would not become a 24-hour home shopping channel; other promises even included the establishment of a news bureau in Washington, D.C. Despite the assurances, Beacon Journal TV columnist Bob Dyer questioned the company's motives based on their prospectus, suggesting that WAKC was bought to help get their home shopping programming on cable thanks to the FCC's "must-carry" regulations for full-power television stations that apply to all cable systems. One of those representatives, vice president of broadcast operations Mike Jones, took over as WAKC's vice president and general manager when the deal closed on April 18, 1994; concurrently, ValueVision and ABC came to an agreement on a new affiliate contract for WAKC, effectively keeping the home shopping programming off of the station entirely.

This sudden change again attracted the ire of Bob Dyer, who openly asked in his June 22, 1994, column why their initial plans for WAKC becoming a home shopping outlet of some sort—all of which were publicly announced to investors, the FCC and the Securities and Exchange Commission—had been abandoned with no explanation. It was later revealed that ABC automatically renewed the affiliation once ValueVision took over via a clause in the existing contract, leaving the new owners with little choice but to continue running the station as an ABC affiliate. The ownership change had one definitive casualty: 23 Nite Videos ended production in early June 1994 after ten years, and aired in reruns throughout the summer. Billy Soule later admitted that Nite Videos was cancelled because Mike Jones "did not want me on the air, period", and was reassigned to off-air duties that included public affairs. Likewise, Tim Daugherty left during the transition to return to WONE-FM and WAKR on a full-time basis.

As part of the promised revamp of the news operations, veteran broadcaster Bob Tayek was hired as vice president of news, while existing news director/lead anchor Mark Williamson was also appointed to head a new investigative reporting unit. Rebranded as "The NorthOhio NewsStation" despite retaining a focus on Akron and Canton, WAKC's 6 p.m. newscast was expanded to one hour on October 31, 1994. That change, however, took longer than expected to implement and came at the expense of their weekend 11 p.m. newscasts, which were canceled and never reinstated. Questions still persisted among the staff about the new owners' commitment to news, while Tayek had assumed most of Mark Williamson's administrative duties. Despite the changes, viewership remained minimal and the quality was uneven at best; general manager Mike Jones even sent a memo to the staff calling one August 1995 newscast he had viewed "the worst newscast ever produced in the history of broadcasting." Bob Dyer later likened Jones unfavorably to then-Browns head coach Bill Belichick in his newspaper column, saying that Jones was "the perfect illustration of why people in places like Akron loathe most of what resides inside the Beltway," owing to his weekend commutes to a Washington, D.C., residence.

=== Paxson takeover ===
Faced with operating a station that they could not use for their own programming, ValueVision announced the sale of WAKC on August 25, 1995, to West Palm Beach, Florida-based Paxson Communications, along with WHAI-TV in Bridgeport, Connecticut, for a combined $40 million in cash; Paxson was already closing in on the purchase of WOAC (channel 67) in Canton, with their chief financial officer having called that station "our entrée to Cleveland." Paxson was another company that specialized in home shopping, albeit of the infomercial variety, and whose founder co-founded the Home Shopping Network, but planned to retain WAKC's local operations and the ABC affiliation. Those intentions had credibility: Paxson had previously acquired WPBF, ABC's West Palm Beach affiliate, and gradually invested into that station's operations while Lowell "Bud" Paxson personally came to the studio promising staffers he would "sink more money" into the station's infrastructure. One month after the Paxson sale was announced, on September 25, 1995, WAKC launched an additional hourlong newscast at 5 p.m. titled Your News, which focused on lifestyle topics and stories with a "news you can use" theme.

News ceases at this moment.

— Dean Goodman, Paxson Communications president, to the WAKC newsroom on February 28, 1996

Hours after the transaction closed on February 28, 1996, Paxson Communications president Dean Goodman entered the newsroom at 1:40 p.m. and tersely said to the staff, "News ceases at this moment." Anchor Mark Williamson and videographer Tim Coffey were at the Church of Jesus Christ of Latter-day Saints in Cuyahoga Falls preparing a series on Mormonism; Williamson called the station only to hear an after-hours voicemail greeting, and by the time they returned to the station, fellow employees notified him and Coffey, not the new management. Reporter Steve Litz, later with Dayton's WHIO-TV and Miami's WTVJ, was told by executives while in a hallway, "we're firing you and your co-workers. Go around the place and pass the word to your friends that we won't be needing you people anymore." Earlier in the day, Williamson admitted to attendees at a senior center that "the station was in turmoil" due to the pending ownership change. Dean Goodman later gave a brief interview to other media outlets in the station's lobby, while two armed security guards were already stationed at the entrance, preventing access to the building for any former employees. One videographer who was the station's current "employee of the month" was notified of his firing over the telephone as his 13-month-old daughter was at a hospital being treated for rheumatoid arthritis.

You never forget, it's like when JFK was shot... Mark Williamson and I were out at The Church of (Jesus Christ of) Latter-Day Saints out in Cuyahoga Falls...we were getting ready to put this three-part series (on Mormonism) together. We literally walked back in the station and they said, "about ten seconds ago, they (Paxson management) said none of us had jobs."

— Tim Coffey

No public on-air notice was given, nor were any newscast promos or "NorthOhio News Station" station identifications removed, resulting in some viewers expressing surprise over the syndicated Today's Health airing in place of the 6 p.m. news. Williamson expressed regret over not being able to break the news of the news department's shutdown, saying, "I was looking at that ugly building with that awful decor and thinking how I've been there almost every day for 17 years. And I was just crying my eyes out because I knew I'd never see it like that again." Williamson's wife, Beacon Journal columnist Mary Ethridge, disclosed that he was one of several employees that was offered a severance package described as "decent" but not extended to all the fired staffers. Then-Akron mayor Don Plusquellic, who subsequently hired Williamson as the communications director for the Akron Public Schools, compared the shuttering of WAKC's news operations to the closure of the O'Neil's department store seven years earlier, musing "people said it was such a shame, and I asked, 'when was the last time you shopped there?'", alluding to the low ratings that had plagued the newscasts throughout. Akron's City Council, however, unanimously passed a resolution critical of the firings and the city's loss of local TV newscasts, with one councilman urging a boycott against channel 23.

The total number of WAKC's 70 employees who were dismissed varied significantly. Paxson management said it was as low as 15, while former staffers said it was between 50 and 60. Later accounts had estimated the firings at 30 on-air and news production people. Williamson claimed that the only people left were "the ones that plug the station in in the morning and make sure the batteries didn't die overnight". Among the fired staffers was operations manager Elwood Edwards, who ValueVision promptly rehired as general manager for KVVV-TV in Houston. Edwards' voice was coincidentally starting to become recognizable as the (then uncredited) "You've Got Mail" voice for America Online's email service. Ultimately, five staffers were retained by Paxson to keep the station operational and to continue with any remaining commercial and public affairs productions, with one staffer tasked to remove any signage relating to "WAKC" throughout the building. Billy Soule was also retained and returned to on-camera work fronting a nightly interview program titled Community News, but resigned on June 28, 1996, in order to meet a deadline Paxson had for remaining staffers that wanted a severance package. Soule said about his last day at the station, "After 18 years, there was no one there to say thanks... I felt I had so much more to offer, and nobody wanted it."

=== Moving out of Akron ===
Dean Goodman and WAKC acting general manager Terry Hanson defended the dissolution of the news department. Hanson said, "we decided this is not the news we want to put on" and were re-evaluating many things but promised more locally produced public affairs shows would air in place of the local newscasts. Goodman stated it would take several months to decide if newscasts could be reinstated, or if WAKC would remain an ABC affiliate. Former viewers called the station and the Beacon Journal to lodge complaints, with one call likening the cancellation of local news to the Cleveland Browns moving to Baltimore. Goodman and Hanson publicly made intentions to move WAKC to "a more modern facility", as the current studios were not deemed proper; subsequent general manager Glenn Schiller described the Copley Road studios as "not nice at all... an old, run-down building." Paxson had consulted Akron officials about replacement sites for both WAKC and WOAC within the city before ultimately filing an application to Warrensville Heights' planning commission on June 21, seeking to rent space next to the studios of WCLV (95.5 FM) in the Cleveland suburb, with WCLV's tower being used as a studio-to-transmitter link. Schiller also disclosed with the announcement that Paxson had no plans to revive a news operation for WAKC.

News of the station's move to Warrensville Heights upset residents and business owners in the West Akron neighborhood, with city officials worried about the building's vacancy potentially harming plans for the neighborhood's economic redevelopment. Indeed, the former studios were used as storage; a onetime employee broke in to the building several times throughout 1997 to steal $75,000 worth of equipment once used by the news department for resale, only to be discovered by former colleagues who managed a Tallmadge electronics store. The Good Shepherd Baptist Church purchased the building in 1998 after their prior sanctuary across the street was destroyed in a fire, but moved out in 2014 after prolonged flooding and water damage to the building. Vacant from that point until the building was demolished in April 2022, signage bearing the "WAKC" name was never fully removed and still graced the building's entrance. WAKC's news tape archive held a better fate: Schiller arranged for the remaining tapes to be loaned to NBC for conversion to digital, then donated to the Summit County Historical Society at no cost.

In the fall of 1996, the station began branding itself as "ABC 23" and added some additional, newly purchased syndicated programs to its schedule. Despite this, Paxson decided to end WAKC's affiliation at 12:01 a.m. on January 1, 1997, a decision that even surprised Schiller, who intended to continue operating WAKC as an ABC affiliate from the new Warrensville Heights facility even without local newscasts. The remainder of their general programming inventory was also dropped on December 31 in favor of Paxson's infomercial service inTV (or the Infomall Television Network). WEWS general manager Gary Robinson expressed relief at no longer having to compete against WAKC for the same audience, a distinction no other Cleveland station had even as WAKC's prime time ratings were minimal by comparison. Having become largely superfluous, Paxson sold off managerial control of WOAC to Global Broadcasting Services in April 1997 for $23 million, but the deal was delayed after Global entered bankruptcy and was purchased by Shop at Home Network, who completed the transaction, while WOAC's operations remained in Warrensville Heights.

Bolstered by a Supreme Court decision affirming the "must-carry" FCC regulations, Paxson began developing plans for a network anchored by their chain of UHF stations, including WAKC, announcing the creation of Pax TV on November 18, 1997, following the acquisition of multiple off-network rerun packages. Consequently, WAKC assumed its current WVPX-TV call sign on January 13, 1998, to reinforce the Pax TV branding, while it was also seen as a symbolic severing of the station's last remaining connection to Akron. Positioned as a "family-friendly" network consisting mostly of high-profile off-network reruns, Pax TV launched on August 31, 1998, with WVPX as a charter owned-and-operated station, carrying the network's entire schedule.

== WVPX-TV (1998–present) ==
=== Attempts at local news ===
...in trying to get Channel 23 to put on a local newscast, (Akron) city officials are ignoring some unpleasant realities about the way TV works. First of all, a newscast, no matter how simple, isn't made by elves. Someone has to pay for it.

— R.D. Heldenfels

While WAKC's operations was the only such television news department wholly based in Akron, WKYC, WEWS and WJW each have maintained staffed news bureaus in the city. WEWS notably entered into a news sharing partnership with the Akron Beacon Journal, invested in a tower camera from the University of Akron's Bulger Hall to assist with skyline shoots in the event of breaking news coverage, and promised to increase staffing in their bureau. Despite this, multiple community and government officials in Akron had repeatedly expressed their public disappointment in the city no longer having a nightly television newscast devoted to the city. Channel 23's closure of local operations and disaffiliation from ABC had given Akron the dubious distinction of being the largest city in Ohio—and one of the largest cities in the United States after Newark, New Jersey—to not have a commercial television newscast or a traditional "Big Three" network affiliate. Conversely, WOIO general manager Tony Ballew likened this newfound demand to "Captain Kangaroo Syndrome" when people complained after CBS canceled the long-running children's television show, while the network had made the move due to low ratings, a fate largely similar to WAKC's newscasts.

Several attempts were made to fill the void. Former channel 23 sports anchor Phil Ferguson attempted a time-brokered Akron-centered nightly sports show on WAKC titled In The Zone; the program only lasted two weeks due to a lack of advertisers. Canal Communications, a for-profit group led by the Rev. Raymond Burgess that consisted solely of volunteers, was established to produce Akron-centered news content on cable-access television with hopes of attaining a low-power television license, but it had little in the way of financial backing. WAOH-LP (channel 29), a low-power television station with a Cleveland simulcast, started rebroadcasting WOIO and co-owned WUAB's newscasts on an hour tape-delay and promised five-minute Akron-centered segments. PBS member stations WNEO/WEAO initially considered starting a nightly newscast but deemed it financially impossible after estimates placed the annual cost for such a venture at a minimum of $1.5 million. WNEO/WEAO instead launched NewsNight Akron, a weekly news and panel discussion program that was subsidized by existing funds provided to the stations; it aired from 1998 to 2013. Former WJW news director and general manager Virgil Dominic even proposed a possible news operation that his Twinsburg-based video production company was willing to produce for broadcast on television or cable, but was solely dependent on securing funding for an extended period. University of Akron Zips football and basketball highlights, however, were still shown over channel 23 via block programming produced by the university's athletic department.

This was our TV station that they packed up and moved out of town, and now they want to climb up on our roof and put an antenna up. I have a problem with that.

— Michael Williams, Akron councilman

When Paxson submitted a zoning request to the Akron City Council on November 15, 1999, for a replacement 963-foot (294 m) high-definition television tower for WVPX—and several other FM stations that used an adjacent tower—the council used the request as leverage, and threatened to deny the permit unless news production was reinstated on the station or an investment would be made into a television news product. The existing transmitter for WVPX was nearing the end of its lifespan, with the station having suffered multiple over-the-air signal outages throughout December 1999 and January 2000, at one point having been off-the-air for three times in one week for prolonged periods. The council issued the permit after Paxson agreed to make a one-time only payment of $300,000 to the city for local news and public affairs productions. WVPX used this tower until the FCC's spectrum auction, when the station moved to the transmitter of WDLI-TV on September 26, 2018, following the purchase of WDLI-TV's license in a channel sharing agreement.

=== WKYC alliance and Pax 23 News ===
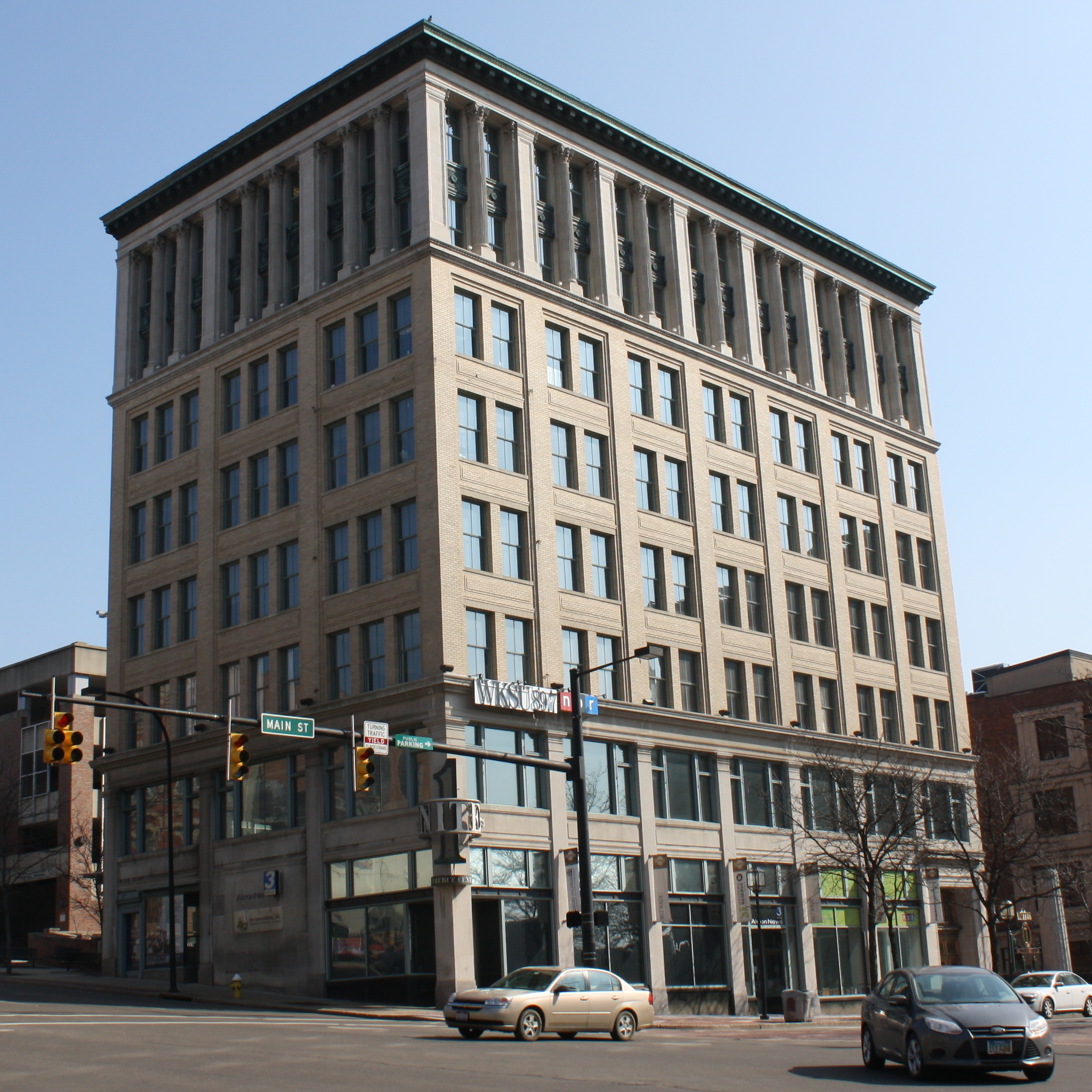
The United Building in downtown Akron

NBC acquired a 32 percent stake in Paxson Communications on September 16, 1999, worth $412 million in convertible stock; the deal was envisioned on a national scale as NBC potentially utilizing Pax TV as a second television network. As part of the deal, NBC began to encourage the owners of their affiliates to enter into management alliances with Pax TV stations; in promoting the new transmission tower for WVPX, Paxson executive Dean Thatcher spoke of a forthcoming agreement between WVPX and WKYC's parent company Gannett, which was initially downplayed by WKYC management. A joint sales agreement was announced between Gannett and Paxson that October 12, the terms of which allowed for WKYC's evening newscasts to be replayed later in the evening, and for WKYC to program an additional hour of airtime for WVPX.

WKYC subsequently announced on March 28, 2001, the launch of a new newscast produced for WVPX by WKYC's news department but focused on Akron stories, and based at an expanded Akron bureau. Launched on June 13, 2001, under the Pax 23 News banner, the program was anchored by WKYC's Akron bureau chief Eric Mansfield, with sports and weather provided by Jim Donovan and Mark Nolan, respectively; both Mansfield and Nolan previously worked at WAKC in the early 1990s. The $300,000 payment provided by Paxson was envisioned by the city of Akron as potential "seed money" for a new television news operation; a seven-member board to manage the funds was considered by Akron mayor Don Plusquellic, but the positions were never filled. However, those funds—along with an additional $200,000 in taxpayer funds from both the city and county governments—were provided by the city of Akron to help finance construction of a new facility for WKYC and Pax 23 News at the United Building in the city's downtown. Former WAKC anchor Mark Williamson, in his position as a spokesperson for the city, likened his involvement on the WKYC alliance to "planning your ex-wife's next wedding." While ratings for the 6:30 p.m. broadcast were relatively small, production of a 10 p.m. newscast began in January 2003, and WKYC general manager Brooke Spectorsky made it known at launch that the station was fully committed to Pax 23 News for the long-term.

I hope people will see that we tried. We stepped up when nobody was stepping up.

— Eric Mansfield

Paxson formally withdrew the joint sales agreement between WKYC and WVPX on March 25, 2005, ending that June 30. This action came as NBC and Paxson were engaged in litigation against each other, NBC having filed for a redemption of what was now a $549 million investment in Paxson. Pax TV also had reportedly lost approximately $76 million in 2003, and rumors began to surface that the company could be sold. After negotiations between different groups, WKYC reached an agreement with Time Warner Cable to produce the newscasts for the cable company's public access channel, which coincidentally held the "23" position; Time Warner Cable also agreed to provide space for WKYC's WeatherPlus digital subchannel. What became Akron/Canton News aired on the cable system until May 30, 2008, when insufficient ad revenue and low ratings made the newscast cost-prohibitive.

Concurrent with the termination of the joint sales agreement with WKYC, Pax TV was rebranded as i, then as Ion Television the following year, with WVPX carrying the network schedule in pattern with no deviations.

=== Sale to Scripps and resale to Inyo ===
Ion Media agreed to be acquired by the E. W. Scripps Company—founding owner of onetime competing ABC affiliate WEWS-TV—in a $2.65 billion deal announced on September 24, 2020, with financing provided by Berkshire Hathaway. In order to meet regulatory approval on both local and national levels, Scripps concurrently agreed to spin off WVPX and WDLI-TV to Inyo Broadcast Holdings in a $45 million deal that concluded WVPX's status as an owned-and-operated network station. As part of the divestiture agreement, Inyo agreed to continue Ion network affiliations for at least seven years, while Ion was subsequently combined with Scripps' Katz Broadcasting subsidiary of digital multicasting networks. Both the sale to Scripps and divestitures to Inyo were completed on January 7, 2021.

Following the acquisition, Scripps announced the March 1, 2021, closure of several digital multicast networks operated by Ion Media—Ion Plus, Ion Shop and Qubo—in favor of existing Katz Broadcasting networks. On February 27, WVPX's 23.2 and 23.3 subchannels switched from Qubo and Ion Shop to Grit and Ion Mystery (the latter re-mapped to 23.4) and co-owned WDLI-TV concurrently switched from Ion Plus to Court TV; WVPX 23.5 changed from HSN to Defy TV on July 1.

Scripps announced its repurchase of all Inyo stations on February 26, 2026.

== Notable alumni ==
- Carol Costello
- Elwood Edwards
- Lauren Glassberg
- Ted Henry
- Scott Muni
- Jeff Phelps

== Technical information ==
=== Subchannels ===
The WVPX-TV/WDLI-TV transmitter is located on Ohio State Route 261 in Norton.

Subchannels of WVPX-TV and WDLI-TV
License	Subchannel	Res.	Short name	Programming
WVPX-TV	23.1	720p	ION	Ion Television
WVPX-TV	23.2	480i	CourtTV	Court TV
WVPX-TV	23.3	480i	BUSTED	Busted
WVPX-TV	23.4	480i	Mystery	Ion Mystery
WVPX-TV	23.6	480i	QVC	QVC
WVPX-TV	23.8	480i	HSN	HSN
WVPX-TV	55.2	480i	BUZZR	Buzzr (WBNX-TV)
WDLI-TV	17.1	720p	Bounce	Bounce TV

Broadcast on behalf of another station

=== Analog-to-digital conversion ===
WVPX-TV shut down its analog signal, over UHF channel 23, on June 12, 2009, the official date on which full-power television stations in the United States transitioned from analog to digital broadcasts under federal mandate. The station's digital signal relocated from its pre-transition UHF channel 59, which was among the high band UHF channels (52–69) that were removed from broadcasting use as a result of the transition, to its analog-era UHF channel 23.

== Bibliography ==
- Price, Mark J. (2015). Lost Akron. Charleston, SC: The History Press. pp. 165–168. ISBN 9781625851079. Archived from the original on January 21, 2022.
- Ritchey, David; Miles, Thomas (October 1993). "WAKR Radio: A History" (PDF). School of Communications. The University of Akron. Archived (PDF) from the original on March 4, 2017 – via Education Resources Information Center.
- United States, Federal Communications Commission (1967). Federal Communications Commission Reports: Decisions and Reports of the Federal Communications Commission of the United States: Volume 4, Second Series, July 1, 1966 to September 30, 1966. Washington, D.C.: U.S. Government Printing Office. pp. 533–535. Archived from the original on January 21, 2022.

== Documentaries ==
- Russo, Cheri (April 1, 2008). Akron, Ohio: The City Where Commercial Television News Went to Black (Television production). Athens, Ohio: WOUB-TV. Archived from the original on October 15, 2008.
