= Jeff Phelps =

Sportscaster

- Born: Jeffrey Thomas Phelps; July 10, 1960 (age 66); Cuyahoga Falls, Ohio, U.S.
- Occupations: Sports talk show host NFL radio postgame host NBA TV pregame/postgame host
- Awards: Three-time Lower Great Lakes Emmy Award winner 1994 NSSA Ohio Sportscaster of the Year; Ohio Broadcasters HOF inductee

Jeff Phelps (born July 10, 1960) is a Cleveland, Ohio-area sportscaster and television host who most recently has worked as the television pregame/postgame host for Cleveland Cavaliers telecasts on Fox Sports Ohio, the pregame/postgame host for Cleveland Browns radio broadcasts, and is a midday co-host on WKRK-FM (92.3 The Fan) in Cleveland.

== Biography ==
A native of the Akron area and graduate of Woodridge High School (Class of 1978) and Kent State University (Class of 1982), Phelps began his broadcasting career in Akron on co-owned WAKR AM 1590 and WAKR-TV 23 as a sports reporter. He then had a five-year stint as a sportscaster on KJAC in Beaumont, Texas.

In 1988, Phelps became a sports reporter and weekend sports anchor for WUAB channel 43 in Cleveland on the 10 O'Clock News, as well as WOIO channel 19 after it had become WUAB's sister station, eventually becoming the weeknight sports anchor for both stations. In 1994, Phelps was recognized for his work by the National Sportscasters and Sportswriters Association (NSSA) and named the 1994 Ohio Sportscaster of the Year.

In 2003, Phelps then moved to Fox Sports Ohio where he became the pregame and postgame host for Cleveland Cavaliers telecasts. He also is a play by play announcer for high school football telecasts on the network as well as the host/producer of the classic car focused show Cruise-In. Phelps' duties on Fox Sports Ohio also have included at various points hosting Cleveland Indians, Cleveland Browns, and Ohio State Buckeyes pregame and postgame shows.

In 2011, the CBS Radio owned WKRK-FM 92.3 switched to a sports talk format. Upon the switch, Phelps then became the co-host for the midday Baskin & Phelps program, alongside former WEWS-TV 5 sports director Andy Baskin. Phelps continues his Fox Sports Ohio work along with his radio duties.

In 2013, following WKRK-FM becoming one of the flagship stations for the Cleveland Browns, Phelps became part of the Browns Radio Network gameday broadcast team, hosting the network pregame and postgame shows.

In 2014, Phelps was the radio play-by-play announcer for Browns preseason games, as well as the postgame host for regular season games. In 2022, Phelps retired from Cavs postgame.

== Awards ==
- Three-time Lower Great Lakes Emmy Awards recipient (1991, 1993, 1999)
- 1994 Ohio Sportscaster of the Year, presented by NSSA
- 2007 inductee - Ohio Broadcasters Hall of Fame

== Personal life ==
Phelps currently lives in Medina, Ohio with his wife and three children. He grew up on the same street as Cleveland-based NBA writer Sam Amico. The two are lifelong friends.
