= Penny Crone =

American reporter

- Born: Barbara Penny Crone; 1950 (age 75–76); New York City, New York, United States
- Occupations: Real estate broker Journalist
- Notable credit(s): Good Day New York; Howard 100 News
- Spouse: Mark Forney
- Children: Travis Forney
- Relatives: Lawrence (brother)

Barbara Penny Crone Forney (born 1950 in New York City) is a former American television and radio reporter, media personality, and current real estate broker for the Douglas Elliman real estate company in New York.

== Career ==
Born in New York to Harold Arthur Crone, president of Hecht's department store, Crone began her journalism career as a federal court reporter for the Hearst Newspaper in Baltimore, before moving to WJZ-TV as a writer and producer. Her first on-air reports occurred in 1973, while working for KMOX-TV, then at the CBS-owned station in St. Louis. Later in the 1970s, she worked for then-independent KPLR-TV, also in St. Louis. Crone was also a feature reporter for Good Day New York at WNYW-TV's Fox 5 Live, a locally produced news and information morning show.

Crone is a three-time local Emmy Award-winner, well known in the New York area for her coverage of the city's police and fire departments, as well as for the New York Yankees. Her additional credits include on-air reporting for WCBS-TV and WWOR-TV, both in New York, as well as a stint at KHOU-TV in Houston. She also co-hosted a morning talk show for WABC Radio in 1998, and appeared in the television movie Mistrial, and in the feature films Daylight and Hero at Large. In addition to her local awards for Outstanding Crime Reporting (1993), Outstanding Multi-Part News Feature (1995), and On-Camera Achievement (1996), Crone received professional honors from several uniformed service organizations, as well as the International Film and Television Festival (1979 and 1980). Her most recent honor was the "Integrity in Journalism Award" (2005) from The New York State Shields.

On January 17, 2007, the New York Daily News reported that Crone left Howard Stern's Howard 100 News on Sirius Satellite Radio because of budget cuts. She subsequently transitioned away from her career in television and radio to become a real estate broker for Douglas Elliman.

== Filmography ==
Year	Film	Role
1980	Hero at Large	Reporter
1995	New York Undercover	Reporter
1996	Daylight	Reporter
1996	Mistrial	Reporter
