= Howard 100 News =

Former radio news team established by Howard Stern

- Genre: News
- Running time: Noon update: 5 minutes Hourly update: 5 minutes A Week in Review: 1 hour
- Country of origin: United States
- Home station: Howard 100 and Howard 101
- Starring: Mike Hambrick; Lisa G. Shuli Egar; Jon Leiberman; Michael Morales; Brad Driver; Steve Langford; Ralph Howard; Penny Crone
- Created by: Howard Stern
- Original release: October 19, 2005 – February 2015
- Website: www.sirius.com/howardstern

Howard 100 News was a radio news team established by American radio personality Howard Stern. The group was formed in October 2005 following Stern's announced move from regular radio to Sirius Satellite Radio in 2006. From January 2006 until February 2015, Howard 100 News would broadcast an hourly summary of stories related to Stern, his radio show, and those associated with it, on Howard 100 and Howard 101. The team was downsized in 2006 and again in February 2015, with only a few staffers remaining to follow the lives of the unusual Stern fans and callers known as "The Wack Pack."

== Background ==
On October 6, 2004, Stern announced the signing of a five-year contract with Sirius Satellite Radio starting from January 2006. The move followed a crackdown on perceived indecency in broadcasting that occurred following the controversy surrounding the Super Bowl XXXVIII halftime show in February. The incident prompted tighter control over content by station owners and managers, leading to Stern feeling "dead inside" creatively. The five-year deal allowed Stern to produce up to three channels on Sirius with a $100 million per year budget for all production, staff and programming costs including the construction of a dedicated studio.

== Launch and original team ==
Howard 100 and Howard 101 went live for the first time on September 29, 2005, initially broadcasting silence. As Stern was still under contract with Infinity Broadcasting until January 1, 2006, he could not broadcast any material from the two channels, or talk on its airwaves. Howard 100 News was created by Talk Radio Consultant Walter Sabo, then in-house at Sirius, who worked with Stern on the concept, and CBS News Anchor Jessica Ettinger Gottesman, then an anchor at CBS-owned 1010 WINS-AM all-news radio. Howard 100 News was crafted to sound like 1010 WINS, and aired its first newscast on October 19, 2005, after off-air trial runs. Original content included radio personality Bubba the Love Sponge interviewing Stern's former writer Jackie Martling. The team eventually grew to 17 staffers, many of whom were professional journalists, including Jessica Ettinger, who, while still employed at CBS, used the on-air name Erica Phillips, as well as Lisa Glasberg (known as Lisa G.), and Steve Langford. Just days after being fired from WNYW-TV, the Fox TV station in New York, reporter Penny Crone was hired to work for Howard 100 News. Crone has since left broadcasting and now works as a licensed real estate agent.

== The team now ==
In June 2006, many of the Howard 100 News staffers were let go. Stern said that this was because it needed downsizing. News director Liz Aiello departed to become the vice president and general manager of Martha Stewart Living Radio on Sirius XM. Erica Phillips, who also worked at CBS News under her real name, became news director before assuming program director duties at other Sirius channels. Reporters Penny Crone and George Flowers left the team in January 2007 due to budget cuts. Most of the other staffers were released in February 2015, leaving Shuli Egar and Jon Leiberman, who focused on covering Stern's unusual fans and callers, known as "The Wack Pack." In January 2017, Lieberman left the Sirius organization and Egar left the show in early 2021.

== The team ==
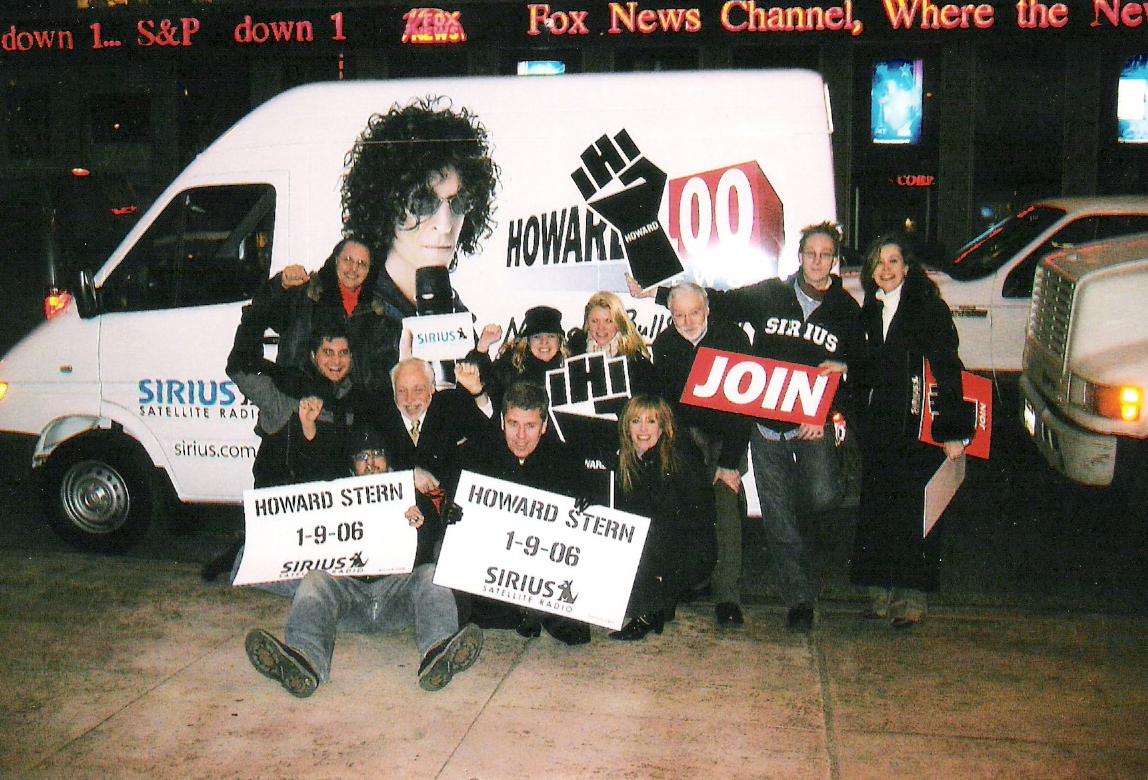
Most of the original Howard 100 News crew.

=== Former ===
- Erica Phillips (Sep. 05 – Nov. 06)
- George Flowers (Sep. 05 – Jan. 07)
- Phil Iazzetta (Oct. 05 – Jun. 06)
- Michelle Jerson (Oct. 05 – Jun. 06)
- Mike Piazza (Oct. 05 – Jun. 06)
- Shuli Egar (Oct. 05 – Mar. 21)
- Steve Langford (Oct. 05 – Jul. 11)
- Ralph Howard (Oct. 05 – May 13; died 2018)
- Lisa Glasberg (Lisa G.) (Nov. 05 – Feb. 15)
- Liz Aiello (Dec. 05 – Aug. 06)
- Penny Crone (Jan. 06 – Jan. 07)
- Jon Leiberman (Aug. 11 – Jan. 17)
- Michael "High Pitch Mike" Morales
- Mike Hambrick
- Steve Juchnevcius
- James Kouledianos
- Lou Pelligrino
- Lisa Zerbo
