= WDLI-TV =

Television station in Canton, Ohio

- Canton–Cleveland, Ohio; United States
- City: Canton, Ohio
- Channels: Digital: 22 (UHF), shared with WVPX-TV; Virtual: 17

Programming
- Affiliations: 17.1: Bounce TV

Ownership
- Owner: Inyo Broadcast Holdings (sale to the E. W. Scripps Company pending); (Inyo Broadcast Licenses LLC)
- Sister stations: WVPX-TV

History
- First air date: January 3, 1967
- Former call signs: WJAN (1967–1983); WDLI (1983–2003)
- Former channel numbers: Analog: 17 (UHF, 1967–2009); Digital: 39 (UHF, 2003–2011), 49 (UHF, 2011–2018), 23 (UHF, 2018–2019)
- Former affiliations: Independent (1967–1986); TBN (1986–2018); Ion Plus (2018–2021); Court TV (2021–2022); Bounce TV (2023–2024); Scripps News (2024); Grit (2024–2025)
- Call sign meaning: David Livingstone Missionary Foundation

Technical information
- Licensing authority: FCC
- Facility ID: 67893
- ERP: 950 kW
- HAAT: 290.32 m (952 ft)
- Transmitter coordinates: 41°3′20″N 81°35′37″W

Links
- Public license information: Public file; LMS
- Website: www.bouncetv.com

WDLI-TV (channel 17) is a television station licensed to Canton, Ohio, United States, serving the Cleveland–Akron area as an affiliate of the digital multicast network Bounce TV. It is owned by Inyo Broadcast Holdings alongside Ion Television affiliate WVPX-TV (channel 23).

Through a channel sharing agreement, WDLI-TV and WVPX-TV transmit using WVPX's spectrum from an antenna at the site of WDLI's former studio on SR 261 in Norton, Ohio.

== History ==
The station first signed on the air in January 3, 1967 as WJAN, an independent station owned by Janson Industries; it offered a typical slate of locally produced and syndicated programming. In its early years, live studio broadcasts were in black-and-white only, as the station could not afford color studio cameras. Feature films and videotaped programming from outside sources were always reproduced on color-capable equipment. However, many of the movies broadcast in the early years were classics from a time when color films were the exception.

Sometime before 1970, the station obtained two IVC color studio cameras, which were replaced in 1971 with state-of-the-art Norelco PC-70s. Almost from the start, WJAN broadcast religious programming. For example, live Sunday morning services from a Baptist church in Canton and other nationally syndicated material supplied on tape and film. A typical program schedule during the week would consist of a sign-on at 1:00 p.m. with syndicated programming, followed by children's cartoons, a children's live entertainment program, local live news, local live variety programs, then repeats of major network programs. Finally, a 10:00 p.m. live newscast followed by a classic film would finish the broadcast day.

Although serving Canton, WJAN was categorized as a Cleveland market station. This made it difficult to obtain desirable programming at a reasonable cost. The right to broadcast a program is usually made exclusive within a market, so WJAN was competing with more established Cleveland stations for the right to broadcast repeats of popular network programming.

Such was the curse of a typical independent UHF station in those times. The allure of taking paid religious programming was hard to resist. Beginning in 1974, WJAN added The PTL Club, a syndicated two-hour program originating (at the time) in Charlotte, North Carolina. ABC affiliate WAKR-TV in Akron added The 700 Club to its daily schedule about the same time.

The relationship between the PTL organization and WJAN deepened. In August 1977, Janson sold WJAN to televangelist Jim Bakker, founder of the PTL Club. Under Bakker, WJAN adopted a near 24-hour-a-day Christian format (keeping local news programming), becoming the first commercial TV station in Ohio to adopt a 24-hour broadcast schedule. Programming was supplied from a wide variety of organizations, both local and national.

In 1981, a satellite receive station was built at the studio-transmitter site. The PTL Satellite Network had recently launched. Being wholly owned by PTL, WJAN soon transitioned to satellite delivery of the majority of all programming.

Bakker was forced to sell WJAN to the David Livingstone Missionary Foundation in December 1982; shortly afterward, its calls were changed to its current call letters, WDLI-TV. The station continued broadcasting the PTL Satellite Service full-time. Four years later, in March 1986, Livingstone sold WDLI to the Trinity Broadcasting Network (TBN). At that point, PTL programs were dropped in favor of TBN programming. On January 1, 2009, WDLI began to be carried on most Cleveland area cable providers.

=== Ion era ===
TBN entered into an option agreement with Ion Media Networks on November 14, 2017, which gave Ion the option to acquire the licenses of WDLI-TV and three other TBN stations that had sold their spectrum in the Federal Communications Commission (FCC)'s spectrum auction; Ion exercised the option on May 24, 2018. The sale was completed on September 25, 2018, creating a duopoly with WVPX-TV. The next day, TBN programming was dropped for Ion Life, effectively re-mapping WVPX's former 23.3 subchannel to 17.1 and allowing that schedule market-wide main-channel cable and satellite carriage (the network would be rebranded as Ion Plus on July 1, 2019).

=== Sale to Scripps and resale to Inyo ===
On September 24, 2020, it was announced that Ion Media Networks would be purchased by the E. W. Scripps Company, longtime owners of ABC affiliate and Scripps co-flagship WEWS-TV, for $2.65 billion through an investment deal with Berkshire Hathaway which included both WDLI and sister station WVPX. WDLI has since been affiliated with various digital subchannels, all of them owned by Scripps Networks.

Scripps announced its repurchase of all Inyo stations on February 26, 2026.

== Technical information ==
=== Subchannels ===
The WVPX-TV/WDLI-TV transmitter is located on Ohio State Route 261 in Norton.

Subchannels of WVPX-TV and WDLI-TV
License	Subchannel	Res.	Short name	Programming
WVPX-TV	23.1	720p	ION	Ion Television
WVPX-TV	23.2	480i	CourtTV	Court TV
WVPX-TV	23.3	480i	BUSTED	Busted
WVPX-TV	23.4	480i	Mystery	Ion Mystery
WVPX-TV	23.6	480i	QVC	QVC
WVPX-TV	23.8	480i	HSN	HSN
WVPX-TV	55.2	480i	BUZZR	Buzzr (WBNX-TV)
WDLI-TV	17.1	720p	Bounce	Bounce TV

Broadcast on behalf of another station

TBN constructed a new studio and transmitter in the Akron suburb of Norton, near other television and radio transmission towers in the area near Akron's Rolling Acres Mall. WDLI's digital signal is receivable throughout the Cleveland market, unlike its analog signal (which originated from a transmitter in the Canton suburb of Louisville), which had poor reception away from Canton. Though the station's operations are now all located near Akron, Canton remains WDLI's city of license. TBN-owned full-power stations permanently ceased analog transmissions on April 16, 2009.

On November 15, 2010, WDLI moved its digital signal from channel 39 to channel 49 (its virtual channel remains 17) as part of an additional boost to its transmitter power.

On June 1, 2015, JUCE and Smile of a Child were consolidated into a single network on the third subchannel to accommodate the addition of a new network, TBN Salsa, on the fifth subchannel where Smile of a Child used to reside. As a result of the change, children's programming that previously aired on Smile of a Child was carried on 17.3 from 7 a.m. to 7 p.m.

=== Spectrum sale and channel sharing arrangement ===
On April 13, 2017, the results of the FCC's 2016 spectrum auction were announced, with TBN successfully selling the UHF spectrum for WDLI for $31.6 million. WDLI would not leave the air, arranging to share a channel with Ion Television owned-and-operated station WVPX-TV (channel 23), and the main TBN channel retained, along with its virtual channel 17. TBN filed a waiver with the FCC to have WDLI remain on the air until April 23, 2018 (an extension from the original turn-in date for their license of January 23), while the channel share was coordinated. On March 30, 2018, WDLI-TV switched off its non-shared signal, leaving it to air only on its new frequency shared with WVPX-TV.

=== Former translators ===
WDLI's signal was once relayed on translators W52DS in Youngstown, and W51BI serving Geauga, Lake, and eastern Cuyahoga counties from a site in Kirtland. Both translators were shut down by TBN due to declining support, which was attributed to the digital transition; W51BI ceased operations on July 13, 2009, while W52DS left the air March 26, 2010. Their licenses, along with 42 other silent TBN repeaters, were cancelled on December 1, 2011, for remaining silent over a year.
