= Ted Henry =

American broadcast journalist

- Born: Ted Henry; 1945 (age 80–81); Canton, Ohio
- Occupation: TV news anchor (retired)
- Awards: Ohio Broadcasters HOF; Cleveland Broadcasters HOF; Ohio AP HOF; Multi-time Lower Great Lakes Emmy Award winner

Theodore "Ted" C. Henry (born 1945, in Canton, Ohio) is a retired television news anchor whose career spanned 44 years in the Northeast Ohio area, most notably as the primary news anchor on Cleveland ABC affiliate WEWS channel 5.

== Bio ==
=== Early life ===
Henry was born during the baby boom generation in 1945 in Canton, Ohio, the son of a local hardware store owner and his wife. As a student at Central Catholic High School, Henry actually got his first job in broadcasting - recording a commercial for his father's hardware store (an ad Henry admits was "really bad").

Following graduating high school in 1963, Henry attended Walsh University (then Walsh College) and a year later transferred to Kent State University, studying telecommunications. He would graduate from KSU in 1968.

After graduating college, Henry was in graduate school at Kent State University, and later at Cleveland State University. At one point in his early twenties Ted entered the Peace Corps, serving overseas for over two years in a tiny third world country village, Caazapa, in Paraguay.

=== Broadcast career ===
Shortly after college, Henry worked as a reporter and weather forecaster for Akron, Ohio TV station WAKR-TV 23, and upon returning home from his Peace Corps service, Henry then worked at sister stations WKBN AM 570 and WKBN-TV 27 in Youngstown, Ohio as a government reporter.

In 1972, Henry came to Cleveland and began work at WEWS. First he served as the weekend weatherman (Henry would admit in later years that as he didn't have a background in weather reporting, he would use forecasts from a Detroit radio station to base his forecast off of). He would work his way up the ranks to reporter, 11 pm news show producer, then weekend news anchor, and in 1975 became the weeknight news anchor, serving in that post for 34 years until his retirement in 2009, working with 13 different co-anchors over that time frame. Henry would make numerous international trips during his WEWS career to cover stories, including to Germany to cover the fall of the Berlin Wall, to Rome to cover the death of Pope John Paul II, and six trips to Israel.

Henry played himself in various episodes of The Drew Carey Show.

=== Retirement ===
Henry announced his retirement on April 23, 2009, and his final newscast was on May 20. In his retirement, Henry and his wife Jody have traveled abroad, filming freelance interviews with religious and spiritual leaders, including followers of Sathya Sai Baba.

== Awards and honors ==
- 1991 inductee - Ohio Broadcasters Hall of Fame
- 1997 Sliver Circle Award (Lower Great Lakes Emmy Awards)
- 2000 Society of Professional Journalists (Cleveland chapter) Distinguished Service Award recipient
- 2002 inductee - Cleveland Association of Broadcasters Hall of Fame
- 2003 Lower Great Lakes Emmy Award recipient (as co-anchor of Live on Five) - Outstanding Daily Newscast
- 2004 inductee - Cleveland Press Club Journalism Hall of Fame
- 2006 Lower Great Lakes Emmy Award recipient (as co-anchor of NewsChannel 5 at 6) - Outstanding Daily Newscast
- 2007 inductee - Ohio Associated Press Broadcasters Hall of Fame
