= Lisa Glasberg =

American radio personality (born 1956)

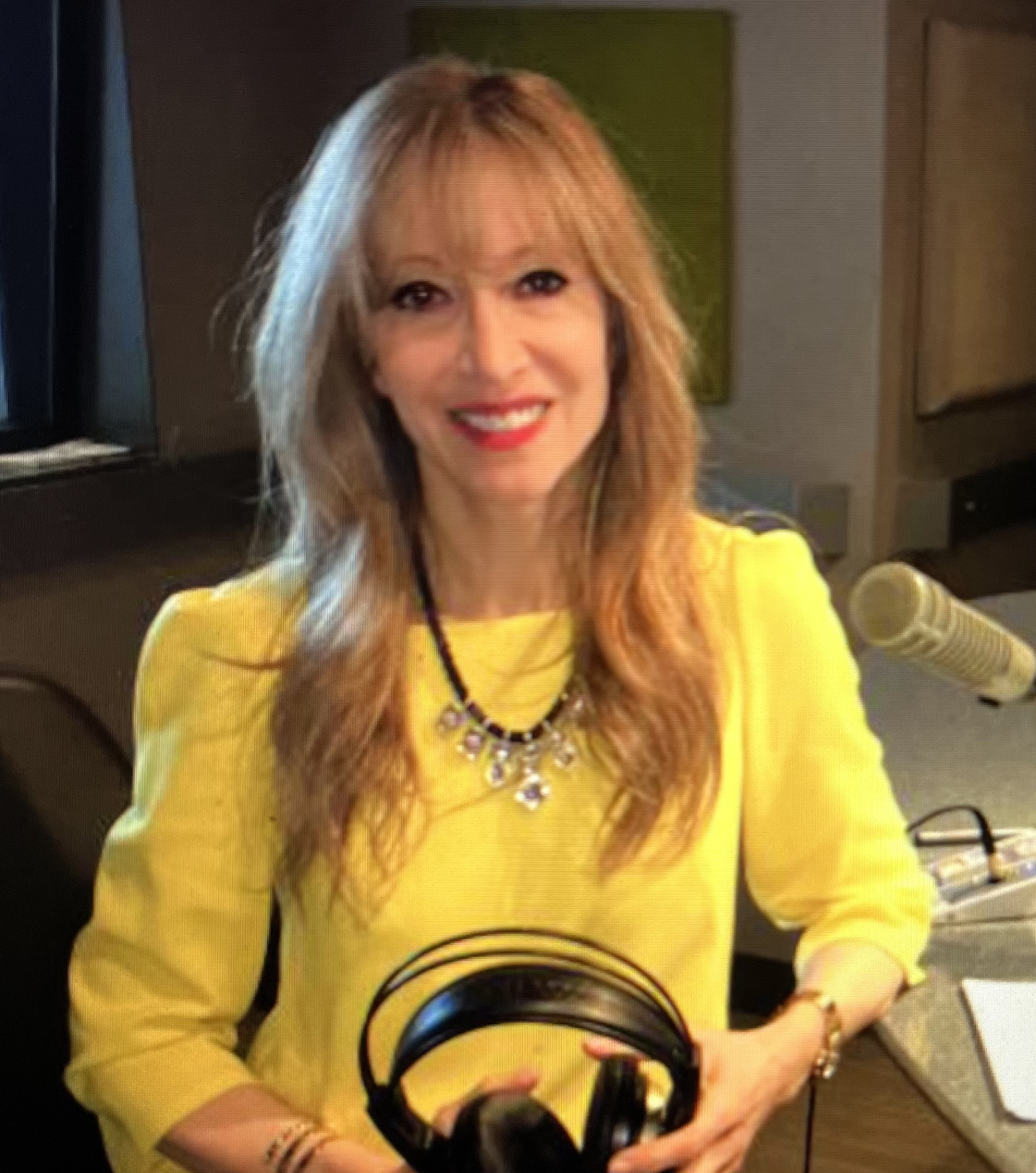
- Born: Lisa Glasberg; November 3, 1956 (age 70); Long Island, New York
- Other name: Lisa G
- Education: Hofstra University
- Occupations: Radio personality; news reporter
- Known for: Howard 100 News
- Website: www.lisag.com

Lisa Glasberg, better known as Lisa G, is an American radio personality. She worked for iHeartRadio in New York City for a decade and most recently can be heard on WABC-AM in New York City.

== Career ==
Glasberg was born on November 3, 1956 in Long Island. She graduated from Hewlett High School in 1974, and interned at the nearby radio station WLIR. She graduated from Hofstra University. She co-hosted a radio show from 1990 to 1999 on Hot 97 FM with Ed Lover and Doctor Dré. In 2002, they helped launch Power 105.1. For three years, she worked on WOR.

In November 2005, Glasberg joined Howard 100 News, Howard Stern's news team at SiriusXM, where she worked until 2015. She has been a correspondent for E!'s Gossip Show, Real TV, WCBS-TV New York and ESPN2's coverage of the New York City Marathon, and is also the voice of 'Running' on the YES Network. On June 18, 2013, she released her first book titled Sex, Lies, and Cookies: An Unrated Memoir.

== Honors ==
- Billboard Air Personality of the Year Award
- 2003 Gracie Allen Award for best local radio host
- Hofstra University Radio Hall of Fame 2009
- Professional In Residence Montclair State University School of Communications

== Media appearances ==
Glasberg was featured on the May/June 2011 cover of Making Music magazine to discuss her life with music.
