= Lauren Glassberg =

American journalist

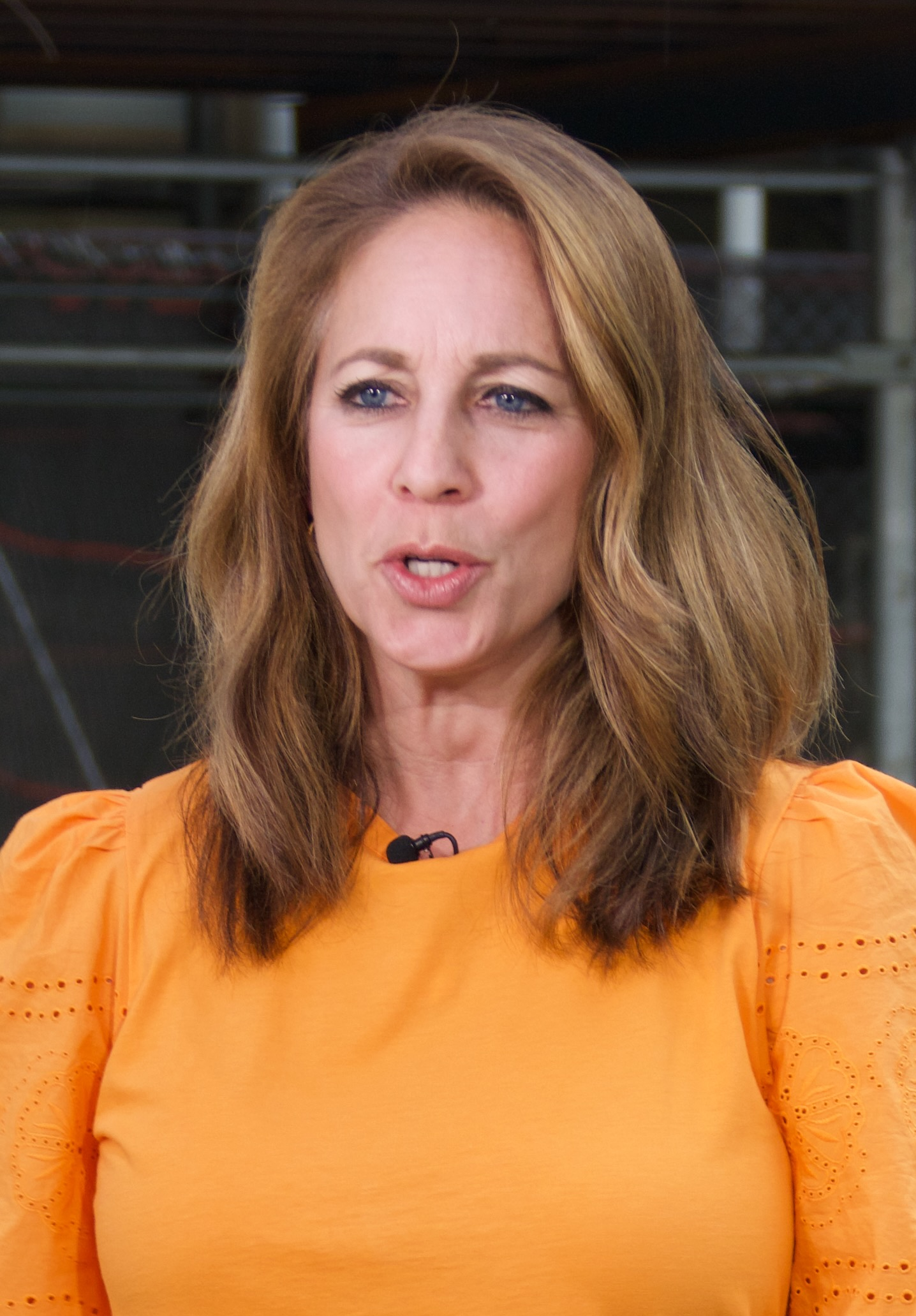
- Glassberg in 2024
- Born: Lauren Glassberg; June 2, 1970 (age 56)
- Education: Northwestern University
- Occupations: Television news anchor, Television journalist
- Employer: The Walt Disney Company
- Television: WABC-TV (2000–present)
- Children: Beau Hudson

Lauren Glassberg (born June 2, 1970) is an American journalist. Currently, Glassberg is a features reporter and substitute co-anchor for WABC-TV's editions of Eyewitness News in New York City. Lauren joined the ABC Affiliate in March 2000. In addition to Lauren's feature stories, she occasionally extends to report the mainstream news during her fill-in anchoring, often alongside anchors Joe Torres and Bill Ritter, respectively.

== Career ==
Lauren started her career in journalism as a teenager writing for the "Main Street Wire," the newspaper on Roosevelt Island. She graduated from Northwestern University's Medill School of Journalism and soon after landed her first television job in Akron, Ohio. From there she headed south to Little Rock, Arkansas where she covered the Whitewater scandal and anchored the Saturday morning news.

At WABC-TV, her Friday food segment is called "Neighborhood Eats". Prior to coming to WABC TV, she anchored KARE 11 Today, which was a morning news show on the NBC affiliate in Minneapolis (the show no longer airs). Before Minneapolis she anchored and reported in Little Rock at KATV, and prior to that she was a reporter at what was then the ABC affiliate WAKC 23 in Akron, Ohio. She grew up in New York City.

Glassberg came to WABC-TV From Little Rock, Arkansas. At ABC, Glassberg serves as a neighborhood reporter, where she provides New Yorkers with local news. She also has a segment called 7 Neighborhood Eats, where she reviews restaurants in the New York City, New Jersey, and Long Island areas.

Akron, Ohio gave Glassberg her first job. In Ohio, Glassberg was a reporter/anchor for an independent station. Next, Glassberg hosted the morning program Good Day Minneapolis, now a part of the Fox affiliation. From there, Glassberg came back to her native New York City, where she came back to the station she grew up watching Eyewitness News in and towards the end of the Bill Beutel and Roz Abrams era. Glassberg's journalistic talent began when she began reporting for the Main Street Wire on Roosevelt Island, New York.

== Personal life ==
On November 16, 2013, Glassberg gave birth to a son, named Beau Hudson.
