= William B. Briggs =

American lawyer

William B. Briggs (born 1954) of Manhattan and Ithaca, New York, is an American subject-matter expert in sports and entertainment law. He is vice president for arbitration and litigation for the National Football League (NFL), an adjunct professor of law at Cornell University Law School, and the Thomas A. O’ Boyle Lecturer in Law at the University of Pennsylvania School of Law. He received his Bachelor of Science at Cornell University in 1976, his Master of Arts at George Washington University in 1978, and his Juris Doctor at Georgetown University Law Center in 1982.

== Expertise ==
Briggs’ expertise includes the application of law and economics to sports and entertainment markets. Beginning as a professional athlete's labor advocate in the late 1970s and 1980s, he has transitioned to the role of counselor of the team owners. His focus includes institutional analysis across multi-competition sectors of the American economy, with a specific focus on the National Football League and the relationship between professional and amateur athletics. In 1983, counselor Briggs was admitted to the bar of the District of Columbia. He was staff counsel for the National Football Players Association/Federation of Professional Athletes through 1988, after which he represented professional athletes in arbitration hearings from 1988 to 1994. He began his teaching career as an adjunct professor, University of Toledo College of Law and Drake College of Law in 1988. He was a visiting associate professor at the School of Industrial and Labor Relations, Cornell University from 1989 to 1994.

== Sample publications ==
- Deborah E. Klein & William Buckley Briggs, Proposition 48 and the Business of Intercollegiate Athletics: Potential Antitrust Ramifications under the Sherman Act, 67 Denv. U.L. Rev. 301 (1990)(cited as authority in several legal journals and reviews, including the Florida Law Review, the Fordham Law Review, the Howard University Law Review, the South Texas Law Review, the Tennessee Law Review, and the Villanova Law Review.)
- William Buckley Briggs, The ‘Good Motives’ of the NCAA and the Anticompetitive Aspects of Proposition 48: Heading on a Collision Course Under the Sherman Act?, Univ. Denv. L.Rev. (Spring 1990), co-author.
- William B. Briggs, Injury Grievances in the National Football League, 63 L. INST. J. 164 (1989).

== Associations ==
Briggs joined the Phi Kappa Psi fraternity at Cornell University, and through that organization, the Irving Literary Society.

He is also an honorary member of Quill and Dagger at Cornell University.
