= Gross Master Junior: For Ages 12–16 =

Gross Master Jr.: For Ages 12–16

Studio album by Jackie Martling
- Released: November 7, 2006
- Genre: Comedy
- Length: 21:07
- Label: Oglio Records

Jackie Martling chronology
Joke Master Jr.: For Ages 3-12 (2006)	Gross Master Jr.: For Ages 12–16 (2006)	Happy Endings (2008)

Gross Master Jr.: For Ages 12–16 is an album by American comedian, comedy writer and radio personality Jackie Martling. The album was released on November 7, 2006, in both CD and MP3 formats on the Oglio Records label.

== Description ==
The MP3 format contains nine "Laugh with Me" tracks, each of them playing eleven jokes for a grand total of 99. The jokes are for kids ages 12 to sixteen years of age.

== Background ==
In 1979, Martling issued his debut LP, What Did You Expect? He released two more albums, 1980's Goin' Ape! and 1981's Normal People Are People You Don't Know That Well. Martling sent all three records to fledgling New York City disk jockey Howard Stern. By 1986, he was a full-time member of Stern's show, later becoming the program's head writer. Martling maintained a steady schedule of live dates while working with Stern, recording Sgt. Pecker, F Jackie, and The Very Best of Jackie Martling's Talking Joke Book Cassettes, Vol. 1. Gross Master Jr. is the tenth CD in Martling's comedic career.

In 2006, Martling had successfully launched the JokeMaster Jr. series of handheld joke machines by selling approximately 50,000 units through mainstream retailers across the country. As Martling explains, recording tracks for the Joke Master Jr. and Gross Master Jr. CDs was a natural extension of his creative effort:

I made a kids talking joke machine, with my voice sped up for "the chipmunk effect," and I think the kids will go nuts for it. A CD with the jokes was a logical next step. ...I know and love jokes of all kinds. Many of the jokes on these two CDs are the classic jokes we all eventually learned as kids. But the jokes on these CDs are the end product of an exhaustive search that includes all of them and then some.
