= Joke Master Jr.: For Ages 3–12 =

Joke Master Jr.: For Ages 12–16

Studio album by Jackie Martling
- Released: November 7, 2006
- Genre: Comedy
- Length: 15:15
- Label: Oglio

Jackie Martling chronology
F Jackie (2000)	Joke Master Jr.: For Ages 12–16 (2006)	Gross Master Junior: For Ages 12–16 (2006)

Joke Master Jr.: For Ages 3–12 is an album by American comedian, comedy writer and radio personality Jackie Martling. The album was released on November 7, 2006, in both CD and MP3 formats on the Oglio Records label.

== Description ==
The MP3 format contains nine "Lots of Fun" tracks, each of them playing eleven jokes for a grand total of 99. The jokes are for children ages three to twelve years.

== Background ==
In 1979, Martling issued his debut LP, What Did You Expect? He released two more albums, 1980's Goin' Ape! and 1981's Normal People Are People You Don't Know That Well. Martling sent all three records to fledgling New York City disk jockey Howard Stern. By 1986, he was a full-time member of Stern's show, later becoming the program's head writer. Martling maintained a steady schedule of live dates while working with Stern, recording Sgt. Pecker, F Jackie, and The Very Best of Jackie Martling's Talking Joke Book Cassettes, Vol. 1. Joke Master Jr. is the ninth CD in Martling's comedic career.

In 2006, Martling had successfully launched the Joke Master Jr. series of handheld joke machines by selling approximately 50,000 units through mainstream retailers across the country. As Martling explains, recording tracks for the Joke Master Jr. and Gross Master Jr. CDs was a natural extension of his creative effort:

I made a kids talking joke machine, with my voice sped up for "the chipmunk effect," and I think the kids will go nuts for it. A CD with the jokes was a logical next step. ...I know and love jokes of all kinds. Many of the jokes on these two CDs are the classic jokes we all eventually learned as kids. But the jokes on these CDs are the end product of an exhaustive search that includes all of them and then some.
