= Joke Man =

The Joke Man

Studio album by Jackie Martling
- Released: November 5, 1996
- Recorded: April 22, 1993 and August 1993
- Genre: Comedy
- Length: 78:00
- Label: Oglio Records
- Producer: Jackie Martling

Jackie Martling chronology
Sgt. Pecker (1996)	The Joke Man (1996)	Hot Dogs + Donuts (1998)

The Joke Man is an album by American comedian, comedy writer and radio personality Jackie Martling. The album was released on November 5, 1996 on the Oglio Records label.

== Track listing ==
1. Chubby and Chan
2. Parrots and Peroxide
3. Grammies and Goobers
4. Mammals and Morons
5. Taxis and O'Tooles
6. Chimps and Chugs
7. Mismatches and Memories
8. Fingers and Floors
9. Boats and Bowels
10. Furry Facefulls and the Frugal
11. Freaks and Families
12. Plungers and Poets
13. Smallcox and Sphincters
14. Bushes and Brides
15. Marriage Jokes and Other True Stories
16. Potency and Pigs
17. Craters and Crappers
18. Holes, Holes, Holes

== Background ==
In 1979, Martling issued his debut LP, What Did You Expect? He released two more albums, 1980's Goin' Ape! and 1981's Normal People Are People You Don't Know That Well. Martling sent all three records to fledgling New York City disk jockey Howard Stern. By 1986, he was a full-time member of Stern's show, later becoming the program's head writer. Martling maintained a steady schedule of live dates while working with Stern, recording Sgt. Pecker, F Jackie, and The Very Best of Jackie Martling's Talking Joke Book Cassettes, Vol. 1. The Joke Man is the second CD from Martling's Stern era.

== Description ==
The Joke Man was recorded in spring and summer of 1993, and released in 1996. Thomas P. Hegarty and Jim Cooper are credited for The Joke Man's photography. Joanie Lapallo provided illustrations.

== Critical reception ==
Professional ratings
Review scores
Source	Rating
Allmusic	4/5 stars

The Joke Man made its appearance some ten years into Martling's stint as head writer for The Howard Stern Show and offered radio listeners who had not seen "The Joke Man" deliver jokes in person certain access to a seasoned comic performer. Stephen Thomas Erlewine gives a new listener requisite perspective on the album, suggesting it has its merits:

Jackie Martling is one of the rare dirty comedians who is actually clever and genuinely funny. Naturally, he's best heard on the Howard Stern Show, where he supplies Howard with jokes during the course of the morning-long radio show. The Joke Man, Martling's first album, isn't quite as uproariously funny as the Stern show, but it's still a lot better than most dirty joke records, offering definitive proof that Martling is both foul and funny.
