= Normal People Are People You Don't Know That Well =

Studio album by Jackie Martling
- Released: 1981
- Genre: Comedy
- Length: LP
- Label: Off Hour Rockers
- Producer: Jackie Martling

Jackie Martling chronology
Goin' Ape! (1980)	Normal People Are People You Don't Know That Well (1981)	Sgt. Pecker (1996)

Normal People Are People You Don't Know That Well is an album by American comedian, comedy writer and radio personality Jackie Martling. The album was released on Martling's Off Hour Rockers label in 1981.

== Background ==
In 1979, Martling issued his debut LP, What Did You Expect? He released two more albums, 1980's Goin' Ape! and 1981's Normal People Are People You Don't Know That Well. Martling sent all three records to fledgling New York City disk jockey Howard Stern. By 1986, he was a full-time member of Stern's show, later becoming the program's head writer. Martling maintained a steady schedule of live dates while working with Stern, recording Sgt. Pecker, F Jackie, and The Very Best of Jackie Martling's Talking Joke Book Cassettes, Vol. 1.
