= Howard Stern videography and discography =

Between 1982 and 1994, American radio and media personality Howard Stern hosted a number of pay-per-view specials and released various VHS and audio tapes.

== Home videos ==
=== Negligeé and Underpants Party ===
Negligeé and Underpants Party

Video by Howard Stern
- Released: March 7, 1988 (VHS)
- Recorded: February 27, 1988 in New York City
- Length: 150 minutes (Pay-per-view); 113 minutes (VHS)
- Labels: Weirdo, Inc. Infinity Broadcasting Corporation
- Directors: Jim Fitzgerald; Wendy Scatloni; Brad Mays
- Producers: Jerry Stanley; Jim Fitzgerald; Gary Dell'Abate

Howard Stern's Negligeé and Underpants Party was Stern's first pay-per-view special and home video release. The event aired live in front of a studio audience and broadcast to mostly East Coast areas at 10 p.m. on February 27, 1988. It cost $19.95 to purchase. It featured Stern, his radio show staff, and the audience wearing underwear or lingerie, and had various segments including live performances and stunts and pre-recorded skits. Various celebrities appeared on the program, including Richard Belzer, Jessica Hahn, Downtown Julie Brown, Judy Tenuta, Emo Philips, Geraldo Rivera, Dweezil Zappa and Moon Zappa. On March 7, the event was released on VHS by Weirdo, Inc. and Infinity Broadcasting Corporation through mail order, with a catalogue number of 1001 and a shortened runtime of 113 minutes.

The event originated after Stern's unsuccessful attempt at securing a late night television show on Fox in 1987. Later that year he entered talks with a pay-per-view production company in producing a one-off special. The format appealed to Stern as the event would be free from broadcast regulations imposed by the Federal Communications Commission (FCC), allowing him creative freedom. The show was the first on-camera appearance of former radio show intern Mitch Fatel, who was given $1,000 by Stern after the special had aired. It was also the debut of early Wack Pack member Vinnie Mazzeo, who lights his penis on fire and tries to cook eggs. He did not practice the stunt beforehand.

Following the event, Stern caught the attention of the Drug Enforcement Administration for on-air comments that detailed his and radio producer Gary Dell'Abate's attempt to obtain drugs for a guest at the event, and that drugs were being used backstage. Law enforcement agent Michael Levine wrote a letter to the New York Daily News, without the agency's knowledge, about wanting to arrest Stern and asking witnesses to rat him out. In July 1988, the DEA declared there was no basis for an investigation and chastised Levine for "inappropriate behavior". Levine later claimed that his letter was not only authorized by the DEA and the Department of Justice, but that Stern's media clout had caused the DEA to back down.

The event received mixed and negative reviews. Belzer recalled the show being "wonderfully sleazy". The Courier-Post summarised the event as "rather entertaining" but was "mostly obscured by the bad taste, cruelty and borderline pornography" that made up the bulk of the program. The Town Talk wrote Stern had "single-handedly set back cable pay-per-view a millennium or two" and described the special as "bone-achingly dull and stupefyingly simple-minded." The best known review was by Kay Gardella in the New York Daily News, which was based on other people's opinions and not from watching it herself. Stern attacked Gardella on the air, which resulted in Gardella reviewing the special after watching the cassette. In her subsequent review, Gardella thought it was "mostly just pathetic" and that in the course of the show, Stern "doesn't do one imaginative, talented or intelligent thing."

Running order:

- Quentin the Stutterer introduces Stern and Quivers and they disrobe
- Stern introduces Siobhan the Transsexual and a man kisses him
- Lesbian Dial-a-Date
- Leslie West performs "Mississippi Queen"
- Vinny Mazzeo lights his penis on fire and cooks eggs
- Penn & Teller perform
- Steve O and Jackie Martling stand-up comedy contest
- The Gay Untouchables short film by Brad Mays
- Bum Makeover with Mitch Fatel
- Guess Who's the Jew with Fred Norris as Kurt Waldheim Jr.
- Steve Rossi sings "Vehicle"

=== U.S. Open Sores ===
U.S. Open Sores

Video by Howard Stern
- Released: December 1989
- Recorded: October 7, 1989
- Venues: Nassau Coliseum, Uniondale, New York
- Length: 100 minutes
- Director: Brad Fuss
- Producers: Richie Namm; Rob Perna; Gary Dell'Abate

Howard Stern's U.S. Open Sores was a live event that took place at the Nassau Coliseum, Uniondale, New York, on October 7, 1989, to a sell-out crowd of 16,000 people. It was filmed and subsequently released as Stern's second home video in December 1989 by One Twelve, Inc. The event centered around a tennis match between Stern and his radio show producer Gary Dell'Abate after Stern challenged him on the air. The idea quickly developed into a large scale event where listeners could pay to attend, and participation from various guests from the show. Stern's co-host and newscaster Robin Quivers played a match with a listener, Darren the Foot Licker. Other segments included stand-up comedy from show writer Jackie Martling, special guest appearances from Celestine, Al Lewis, Jessica Hahn, Sam Kinison, and Leslie West, and live music from Pig Vomit.

The event was organised by Live Nation chairman and concert promoter Ron Delsener, after employee Ross Zapin heard Stern challenge Dell'Abate and got in touch with Stern's agent. It sold out in one day. An original idea was to feature topless ball girls during the match and Stern held auditions on his radio show for participants, but Nassau County authorities informed the promoters that topless entertainment was illegal, so the girls wore pasties. Kinison paid for himself and a group of friends to attend the event out of his own expenses, and the crowd stormed the arena floor during his performance of "Wild Thing" with West, which caused a near riot. Radio producer Fred Norris appeared as his on-air character Kurt Waldheim Jr., dressed in a Nazi outfit and emptied an envelope of ashes pretending they were Anne Frank's remains. Stern had planned to have Vinnie D'Amico warm up the crowd with his stunt that involved dipping a living mouse in olive oil before swallowing it whole and vomiting, but marshalls from the ASPCA turned up at the event and threatened to arrest Stern if the stunt went ahead.

The video includes additional footage including Stern and his staff organising and preparing for the event, and backstage action. It was only available through mail order; after the telephone line to order tapes closed, copies were found for sale in local Wiz outlets.

Running order:

- Jackie Martling pre-event stand-up comedy
- Celestine plays "The Star-Spangled Banner" with her tongue
- Fred Norris as Kurt Waldheim Jr. and Quentin the Stutterer
- Robin Quivers vs Darren the Foot Licker in a best-of-3 tennis match (with Fred the Elephant Boy as umpire)
- Howard Stern vs Gary Dell'Abate in a best-of-7 tennis match
- Vinnie Mazzeo lights his head on fire and Dr. Marshall King hypnotises Kimberly Taylor
- Gina Man and Crazy Jerry
- Jessica Hahn and Sam Kinison
- Sam Kinison performs "Wild Thing" with Leslie West
- Backstage footage and interviews

Personnel:

- Don Buchwald – executive producer (live event and videotape)
- "Boy" Gary Dell'Abate – associate producer (live event and videotape)
- Neil Reiff, Michael Morris – assistant to "Boy" Gary (live event)
- John Casano, Jude T. Pagano – chief of "release police" (live event)
- John Melendez – production co-ordinator (live event)
- Scott Salem – audio consultant (live event)
- Michael Farkas, Tim Reid, Jeff Sapan, Ernie Back, Cynthia Breakfield, Eric Leeds, Beata Tycho, Jackie Fitzpatrick, Coleen Fitzpatrick – production assistant (live event)
- Billy West – sports announcer (live event)
- Richie Namm – producer (videotape)
- Scott Rader – editor (videotape)
- Brad Fuss – director (videotape)
- Ken Hahn – audio post (videotape)
- Rob Perna – associate producer (videotape)
- Vincent Ruiz – graphics (videotape)

=== Butt Bongo Fiesta ===
Butt Bongo Fiesta

Video by Howard Stern
- Released: October 1992
- Recorded: Chelsea Television Studios, New York City
- Length: 96 minutes
- Labels: One Twelve, Inc. Infinity Broadcasting Corporation
- Director: Michael Bernhaut
- Producers: John Lollos; Dan Forman; Gary Dell'Abate

Butt Bongo Fiesta was Stern's third home video that was released in October 1992. The main segments of the video are Jungle Man, a short film featuring segments shot in 3D, and Butt Bongo.

The concept developed in 1992 when a newspaper reported plans for Stern's show to be syndicated to a radio station in Maine. The article mentioned a pair of local DJs known for "bongo butt" segments, whereby the hosts play songs and spank their girlfriend's bottoms like a bongo drum. Stern had a pair of listeners try the same thing on his radio show, which led to the idea of producing a new videotape with butt bongo as the main feature. After Stern's late night variety show on WWOR-TV was cancelled in August 1992, he asked listeners to suggest ideas for segments they wanted to see on the video and brought in members of the WWOR-TV show crew to produce it, including producer Dan Forman and writer Mark Cronin. The latter said Stern wanted Butt Bongo Fiesta to be "the perfect Channel 9 show episode" without the time and content restrictions imposed by network television management. Stern hosted the Butt Bongo segment as Howardo Estern, which was inspired by Ricky Ricardo of the sitcom I Love Lucy.

Butt Bongo Fiesta was a commercial success during its limited mail order release, selling around 260,000 copies for an estimated gross of $10 million. Stern looked back at the video and considered it to be his best videotape.

Running order:

- What Do You Want to See?
- Jungle Man and the Adventures of Big Naked Sloppy Titty Women in 3D
- Behind the scenes footage of the 1990 John DeBella Funeral
- Guess Who's the Jew with Fred Norris as Kurt Waldheim Jr. and Daniel Carver
- Daniel Carver rates various ethnic groups
- Tribute to the Vagina with Jessica Hahn
- Pick Your Partner's Vagina game
- Robin's Breasts
- Lesbian Love Connection
- Howardo Estern's Butt Bongo

=== The Miss Howard Stern New Year's Eve Pageant ===
The Miss Howard Stern New Year's Eve Pageant Howard Stern's New Year's Rotten Eve 1994
- Directed by: Greg V. Fera
- Written by: Jackie Martling; Fred Norris; Mark Cronin; Al Rosenberg; Danny Steinberg
- Produced by: John Lollos; David Berrent; Frank Belmont; Scott Einziger; Beth Burke
- Edited by: Lisa M. Mendoza
- Distributed by: Main Events Television; One Twelve, Inc.
- Release dates: December 31, 1993 (Pay-per-view); February 1994 (VHS)

The Miss Howard Stern New Year's Eve Pageant was Stern's second pay-per-view event that aired live on December 31, 1993. It centered around a satirical beauty pageant to crown a Miss Howard Stern, with the winner receiving a $50,000 prize. The pageant featured several celebrity judges, including Janis Ian, Daniel Carver, John Bobbitt, Sherman Hemsley, Mark Hamill, Tiny Tim, and Joe Frazier.

In May 1993, Main Events Television sought potential talent to stage a pay-per-view production that would generate enough subscriptions on-par with boxing matches, then the most popular pay-per-view events at the time. In August, Stern began to discuss the idea of staging another television special on the air and a month later, struck a deal with the company. Stern earned a reported $1 million advance when it was green-lit. It cost $2 million to produce and market the event, which was originally to be held at the Atlantic City Convention Center before the venue was changed to Newark Symphony Hall in Newark, New Jersey.

Over 40 women and one man competed in the pageant, most of whom had won preliminary contests held in cities where Stern's radio show was syndicated to at the time. The 20 finalists competed in live lingerie and talent rounds, after which five were chosen for the final interview round. Elaine Marks won the contest, who claimed she had appeared in Playboy as a result. Other notable contestants were Debbie the Space Alien of the show's Wack Pack and bodybuilder and future professional wrestler Nicole Bass.

The event was a considerable commercial success; around 400,000 households purchased the show for an estimated gross of $16 million, breaking the subscriber record for a non-sports event previously held by a New Kids on the Block concert in 1990. The New York Post called it "the most disgusting two hours in the history of television". In February 1994, the event was released on VHS as Howard Stern's New Year's Rotten Eve 1994 by One Twelve, Inc. and Infinity Broadcasting Corporation, the title being a spin on the television show Dick Clark's New Year's Rockin' Eve. The video was packaged with a portrait of Stern by artist LeRoy Neiman, and included footage of Stern and his staff discussing the event and scenes from backstage and the post-event party.

In 2020, a clip of the Ted Danson and Whoopi Goldberg sketch in which Stern dressed in blackface and used racial slurs resurfaced when Donald Trump Jr. posted it on social media after Stern criticized President Donald Trump on a recent show. Stern admitted, "The shit I did was fucking crazy" and that he has since toned down his show, crediting years in psychotherapy for his evolution.

Running order:

- Stern and crew discuss and preview the event
- Michael Jackson parody
- The Miss Howard Stern Pageant – Opening song and contestant introductions
- The Miss Howard Stern Pageant – Celebrity judge introductions
- John Wayne Bobbitt fundraiser
- The Miss Howard Stern Pageant – First round eliminations
- The Bee Gees perform
- Ted Dansen and Whoopi Goldberg skit
- The Miss Howard Stern Pageant – Contestants who did not make it
- Janice Ian and Stern perform a parody of "At Seventeen"
- New Year's Eve countdown
- Gary Dell'Abate performs "Do the Ba Ba Booey"
- The Miss Howard Stern Pageant – Contestant profiles
- Bobbitt fundraiser update
- The Miss Howard Stern Pageant – Interview round
- The Miss Howard Stern Pageant – Miss Howard Stern 1994 crowned
- The Miss Howard Stern Pageant – Song finale

== Discography ==
=== 50 Ways to Rank Your Mother ===
50 Ways to Rank Your Mother

Studio album by Howard Stern
- Released: 1982
- Studios: The Ranch, New York City
- Genre: Parody music
- Labels: Wren Records (1982); Ichiban/Citizen X (1994 reissue)

50 Ways to Rank Your Mother is a studio album released in 1982 by Wren Records, while Stern hosted the morning show at WWDC-FM in Washington, D.C. It is a comedy album of song parodies performed by Stern and the Earth Dog Band, a group led by his producer Fred Norris, plus bits from the radio show and excerpts of people's opinions about him. The vinyl included a poster of the front artwork. It was reissued in September 1983 when Stern had moved to host afternoons at WNBC-AM in New York City. In November 1994, the album was reissued on CD by the Ichiban and Citizen X labels with a new title, Unclean Beaver.

Track listing:

1. Oh, Oh, Oh, Oh, OJ—Baby You Can Rent a Car
2. Unclean Beaver, Episode I
3. 4 Blacks and a Mac
4. Happy Birthday to You
5. Richard's Family Fewd
6. Barry Off-White's Ode to Howit
7. Assola
8. Havana Hillbillies
9. He's Sick
10. I Shot Ron Reagan
11. Howard Stern?
12. Unclean Beaver, Episode II
13. Nail Young's Cat
14. Family Affarce
15. Springstern's Easter Parade
16. 50 Ways to Rank Your Mother
17. Howard Stern Is a God

Personnel Music

- Howard Stern – lead vocals, "God"
- P.K. Goodwyn – bass
- T-Bone Wolk – bass
- Frankie Casual – drums
- T. Metola – guitar
- Condor the Barbarian – keyboards

Production

- Howard Stern – production, writer (except "50 Ways to Rank Your Mother")
- "Earth Dog" Fred Norris – production, writer (except "50 Ways to Rank Your Mother")
- Millsey Brown – production, recording, mixing
- Mary Mattingly – art direction, design
- Ira Wasserman – engineer
- Tom McCarthy – engineer
- Chuck Auster – executive producer
- Cristina Taccone – back cover photographs
- Jamie Phillips – front cover and sleeve photographs

=== Crucified by the FCC ===
Crucified by the FCC

Compilation album by Howard Stern
- Released: February 1991
- Length: 122:22
- Label: Infinity Broadcasting Corporation

Crucified by the FCC is a box set released as a single CD and two audio cassettes by Infinity Broadcasting Corporation in February 1991. It features segments from Stern's radio show that were censored from broadcast and skits recorded specifically for the album. Stern produced the set after the first fine was issued to Infinity by the FCC, following an investigation over indecent material from a listener which led to a $6,000 fine in November 1990. An excerpt from a segment in question is featured on the track "Christmas Party", where a man plays a piano with his penis.

Stern edited and assembled the set in a studio that he had set-up in his home basement, using the project as an excuse to use the equipment. He used traditional reel-to-reel recorders and as he was familiar with the process from his early radio career, and unexpurgated versions of radio broadcasts. WXRK General Manager Tom Chiusano said this became the set's unique selling point, as it was the first attempt at reselling content from the radio show and in a form that was unavailable to listeners. The set was available via mail order and included a 12-page booklet chronicling the show's history and its run-ins with the FCC.

In March 1991, as part of the album's promotion, Stern went on NBC's 1:30 a.m. late-night talk show Later for a guest appearance that became notable due to ensuing confrontational conversation with the show's fill-in host Tom Snyder. NBC censored Stern when he gave out the phone number to order the product, which annoyed him as he saw little point in appearing on the show if he was unable to promote it. The Associated Press described the interview as "hilarious, wrong-headed, comical and ultimately sad."

CD track listing
| No. | Title | Length |
|---|---|---|
| 1. | "Anti-Censorship Rally" | 2:28 |
| 2. | "Celebrities – Pt. 1" | 5:01 |
| 3. | "Celebrities – Pt. 2" | 6:50 |
| 4. | "Celebrities – Pt. 3" | 8:15 |
| 5. | "Sex Phone/Viper" | 3:35 |
| 6. | "Christmas Party" | 17:55 |
| 7. | "Phony Phone Calls" | 7:05 |
| 8. | "Various Bits Remembered" | 7:24 |
| 9. | "Bob N' Ray" | 3:59 |
| 10. | "Fartman" | 2:19 |
| 11. | "Out of the Closet Movies" | 4:37 |
| 12. | "Homo Room" | 10:21 |
| 13. | "Various Bits Remembered II" | 11:45 |
| 14. | "Sam and Jessica" | 14:50 |
| 15. | "The Stern Family" | 11:13 |
| 16. | "The Gynaecologist" | 3:21 |
| 17. | "Credits" | 1:24 |

Personnel
Credits are taken from the CD edition.

- Scott Salem – engineer
- Howard Stern – liner notes
- Dick Hehmeyer – narrator
- Heller New York Inc. – package design
- Specialty Records Corporation – pressing

=== Private Parts: The Album ===
Private Parts: The Album

Soundtrack album by Howard Stern
- Released: February 25, 1997
- Genres: Hard rock; classic rock
- Length: 63:41
- Label: Warner Bros.
- Producers: Peter Afterman; Jeff Gold; Rick Rubin

Howard Stern chronology
| Crucified by the FCC (1991) | ''Private Parts: The Album'' (1997) |

Professional ratings
Review scores
| Source | Rating |
|---|---|
| AllMusic | 3/5 stars |

Private Parts: The Album is the soundtrack album to the 1997 biographical comedy film based on Stern's first book Private Parts, released on February 25, 1997 by Warner Bros. Records. The album is a compilation of classic and contemporary rock songs with excerpts from various scenes from the film. Two songs are original tracks featuring Stern on vocals: "The Great American Nightmare" performed by Rob Zombie and "Tortured Man", co-written and performed by The Dust Brothers with assistance from Stern's writers Jackie Martling and Fred Norris. The former has been the opening theme to Stern's radio show since 1999. The album was produced by Peter Afterman, Jeff Gold and Rick Rubin. A cover of the Led Zeppelin song "No Quarter" performed by Tool was originally planned to be on the album, but did not appear due to Tool deciding against allowing it to be used, leading to criticism from Howard Stern, who had previously endorsed the band.

The album was promoted with alternate covers. Of the first one million copies pressed, 600,000 of them depicted a cover of a nude Stern with the New York City skyline covering him with the Empire State Building covering his genitals. The remaining copies were divided into three alternate cover schemes that were one time pressings only, a similar tactic used for the paperback edition of Stern's second book, Miss America. A fifth version of the soundtrack was for promotional use only. A ticket was placed in one copy of the first million pressed which gave the buyer the chance to receive the album pressed in gold.

Upon release, the album went to No. 1 on the Billboard 200 chart. As the film entered the box office at number one, this feat marked the first double chart debut in American history. Stern became the second radio personality to have topped a US record chart, behind Rick Dees. On May 8, 1997, it was certified platinum by the Recording Industry Association of America for selling one million copies.

Track list
| No. | Title | Artist | Length |
|---|---|---|---|
| 1. | "Pig Virus" | | 0:39 |
| 2. | "The Great American Nightmare" | Rob Zombie with Howard Stern | 3:54 |
| 3. | "Mama Look - - A Boo Boo" | | 1:31 |
| 4. | "I Make My Own Rules" | LL Cool J (uncredited) with Red Hot Chili Peppers (Flea, Dave Navarro and Chad Smith) | 4:33 |
| 5. | "The Match Game" | | 0:40 |
| 6. | "Hard Charger" | Porno For Pyros | 6:46 |
| 7. | "Moti" | | 0:34 |
| 8. | "The Suck for Your Solution" | Marilyn Manson | 4:01 |
| 9. | "Lance Eluction" | | 0:29 |
| 10. | "Pictures of Matchstick Men" | Ozzy Osbourne with Type O Negative | 5:59 |
| 11. | "The Contest" | | 0:14 |
| 12. | "Tired of Waiting for You" | Green Day | 2:30 |
| 13. | "WRNW" | | 0:13 |
| 14. | "Pinhead" | Ramones | 2:42 |
| 15. | "Oh Howard" | | 0:49 |
| 16. | "The Ben Stern Megamix" | Charlie Clouser | 2:15 |
| 17. | "The Howard Stern Experience" | | 0:40 |
| 18. | "Smoke on the Water" | Deep Purple | 5:34 |
| 19. | "WCCC" | | 0:08 |
| 20. | "I Want You to Want Me" | Cheap Trick | 3:37 |
| 21. | "The Antichrist" | | 0:12 |
| 22. | "Cat Scratch Fever" | Ted Nugent | 3:36 |
| 23. | "WNBC" | | 0:33 |
| 24. | "Jamie's Cryin'" | Van Halen | 3:26 |
| 25. | "Crackhead Bob" | | 0:09 |
| 26. | "You Shook Me All Night Long (Live)" | AC/DC | 3:52 |
| 27. | "Howard You Stink" | | 0:10 |
| 28. | "Ladies & Gentlemen" | | 0:05 |
| 29. | "Tortured Man" | Howard Stern and The Dust Brothers | 3:50 |
| Total length: | | | 63:41 |
