= Hot Dogs + Donuts =

Studio album by Jackie Martling
- Released: August 25, 1998
- Recorded: November 27, 1996 – March 5, 1998
- Genre: Comedy
- Length: 78:18
- Label: Oglio Records
- Producer: Carl Caprioglio

Jackie Martling chronology
Joke Man (1996)	Hot Dogs + Donuts (1998)	The Very Best of Jackie Martling's Talking Joke Book Cassettes, Vol. 1 (1999)

Hot Dogs + Donuts is an album by American comedian, comedy writer and radio personality Jackie Martling. The album was released on August 25, 1998 on the Oglio Records label.

== Track listing ==
1. Poops & Probes
2. Jammers & Geniuses
3. Smooches & Stammers
4. Munchers & Mares
5. Nips & Necklaces
6. Odors & Officers
7. Eaters & Errors
8. Contemplators & Calculators
9. Abstainers & Architects
10. Condiments & Compliments
11. Barf & Breadwinners
12. Humpers & Holders
13. Clammers & Chubbies
14. Turds & Trims
15. Chasers & Cruisers
16. Pullers & Puppets
17. Gamblers & Grunters
18. Pooches & Perverts
19. Semen & Showmen
20. Gigolos & Gourmets
21. Pharmacists & Fishes
22. Polin' The Colon
23. Squirters & Soilers
24. Siblings & Surprises
25. Leches & Lures
26. Tears & Trades

== Background ==
In 1979, Martling issued his debut LP, What Did You Expect? He released two more albums, 1980's Goin' Ape! and 1981's Normal People Are People You Don't Know That Well. Martling sent all three records to fledgling New York City disk jockey Howard Stern. By 1986, he was a full-time member of Stern's show, later becoming the program's head writer. Martling maintained a steady schedule of live dates while working with Stern, recording Sgt. Pecker, F Jackie, and The Very Best of Jackie Martling's Talking Joke Book Cassettes, Vol. 1. Hot Dogs + Donuts is the third CD from Martling's Stern era.

== Description ==
Hot Dogs + Donuts was recorded live at Chuckles, Mineola, Long Island; The Comedy Palace, Andover, Massachusetts; and David Brenner's Laugh House, Philadelphia, Pennsylvania between November 27, 1996 and March 5, 1998. The producer was Carl Caprioglio.

Martling sketches out the details of the album's origins:

"Since the girls at the telemarketing company I was using then wouldn't say 'Sergeant Pecker,' I told the crowds at the tapings for the next CD that I decided to make it a bit more cryptic and call the next one Hot Dogs & Donuts, figuring if somebody made something sexual of it that it was as much them as it was me. I recorded Hot Dogs & Donuts at The Comedy Palace in Andover, Massachusetts. Ron Sava's club always had the kind of buzz that I could only always count on in a few places. One of the others was Rascals in West Orange, where they taped the "Stump The Joke Man" footage that's on the DVD we included with Snart. I had edited almost the entire Hot Dogs & Donuts CD when I performed at The Comedy Palace again. From listening for hours and hours as I edited, the jokes were even more deeply & perfectly engrained in my little head, so I blasted away at those crowds like never before. The tapes from that weekend pushed the older tapes off the shelf and I started editing again. But that editing was minimal. The finished product is pretty funny and a healthy leap dirtier than the first two CD's. Not by design, it just is."

Professional ratings
Review scores
Source	Rating
Allmusic	link
Daily Vault	A− link
