= Federal Communications Commission fines of The Howard Stern Show =

History of FCC fines issued over The Howard Stern Show

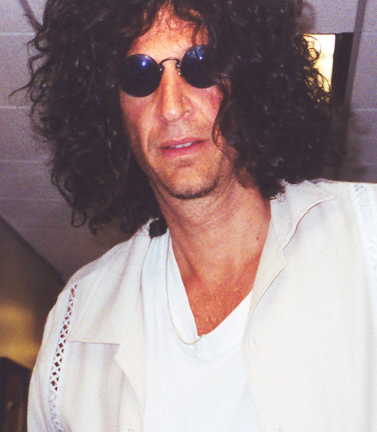
Howard Stern in 2000

Between 1990 and 2004, the Federal Communications Commission (FCC) issued a record total of $2.5 million in fines against radio station licensees for indecent content broadcast on The Howard Stern Show. These penalties, resulting from legal battles, record-breaking settlements, and heightened regulatory crackdowns, made the syndicated morning program the most heavily sanctioned show in American radio history. The enforcement actions fundamentally altered the parameters of what could be broadcast on terrestrial airwaves. They ultimately served as the primary catalyst for Stern's historic departure from traditional radio to subscription-based Sirius Satellite Radio in 2006.

The regulatory conflict began in earnest following the Supreme Court's landmark 1978 ruling in Federal Communications Commission v. Pacifica Foundation, which established the legal framework allowing the FCC to regulate indecent material on public airwaves. As Stern's show expanded into national syndication during the late 1980s and 1990s, his confrontational "shock jock" format frequently drew complaints from conservative watchdog groups. The FCC responded by targeting the corporate owners of the stations airing his show, most notably Infinity Broadcasting and later Clear Channel Communications. In 1995, to resolve a mounting backlog of indecency violations without risking the revocation of their lucrative broadcast licenses, Infinity agreed to a then-unprecedented $1.7 million settlement with the U.S. Treasury.

A second major wave of regulatory enforcement escalated in early 2004, fueled by political pressure and heightened public scrutiny of broadcast media following the Super Bowl XXXVIII halftime show controversy. The FCC dramatically increased its statutory maximum penalties, leading to a single, record-breaking $1.75 million settlement with Clear Channel in June 2004 to clear violations stemming from Stern's show and other programs. Clear Channel subsequently dropped Stern from its six major-market stations due to corporate risks. Frustrated by what he characterised as a government-backed campaign of censorship, Stern signed a multi-year, $500 million contract with Sirius in October 2004. Moving to Sirius allowed Stern to broadcast uncensored, marking a major turning point in the media landscape that accelerated the commercial viability of satellite radio.

== Background ==
FCC fines issued
Date	Amount	Company	Outcome
November 29, 1990	$6,000	Infinity	Paid; part of 1995 settlement
October 27, 1992	$105,000	Greater Media	Paid
December 18, 1992	$600,000	Infinity	Paid; part of 1995 settlement
August 12, 1993	$500,000	Infinity	Paid; part of 1995 settlement
August 12, 1993	$73,750	Americom	Rescinded in 2000
February 1, 1994	$37,500	Americom	Rescinded in 2000
February 1, 1994	$400,000	Infinity	Paid; part of 1995 settlement
May 20, 1994	$200,000	Infinity	Paid; part of 1995 settlement
October 15, 1996	$10,000	Benchmark	Reduced to $6,000; paid
April 8, 1997	$12,000	EZ	Paid
June 24, 1997	$6,000	Infinity	Rescinded in 2001
June 5, 1998	$2,000	Eagle Radio	Paid
June 29, 1998	$6,000	Clear Channel	Paid
March 18, 2004	$27,500	Viacom	Paid; part of 2004 settlements
April 8, 2004	$495,000	Clear Channel	Paid; part of 2004 settlements

In 1978, the United States Supreme Court upheld the FCC's authority to sanction broadcasters for indecent programming aired at hours when children might be listening. The landmark decision arose from a 1973 broadcast of Filthy Words, a 12-minute monologue by comedian George Carlin that repeatedly used the "seven dirty words". Between 1975 and 1987, no television or radio broadcaster was fined for indecency. The FCC treated the seven words identified in the Carlin monologue as indecent, and for several years its enforcement focus remained largely confined to that kind of material. Until 1987, the ruling gave broadcasters a relatively clear, if limited, guide to follow.

The FCC had received complaints from listeners about Howard Stern since 1981, when he hosted mornings at WWDC in Washington, D.C. The Communications Act of 1934 and First Amendment laws, however, limited its power to take further action. In reply to a complaint about Stern in 1985, who by now had relocated to afternoons on WNBC in New York City, the FCC responded, "Our role in overseeing program content is...very limited...the First Amendment protects the right of broadcasters to air statements which may be offensive, and a free society requires governmental forbearance in those instances." Following his abrupt firing from WNBC, Stern returned to afternoons on WXRK in New York owned by Infinity Broadcasting, and moved to mornings from 6:00 am in February 1986.

== 1986–87: Revised indecency standard ==
Stern entered national syndication on August 18, 1986, when Infinity's WYSP in Philadelphia began simulcasting his show. James McKinney, chief of the FCC's Mass Media Bureau, later reported that more Philadelphia listeners complained about Stern in his first three months on WYSP than New York listeners had in the previous three years. On November 14, 1986, McKinney opened an investigation after WYSP was one of three stations cited for airing material that might be indecent. Infinity was given 30 days to respond to three complaints alleging that Stern had violated Section 1464 of the United States Code, (Note: Title 18, Section 1464 of the United States Code states: "Whoever utters any obscene, indecent, or profane language by means of radio communication shall be fined under this title or imprisoned not more than two years, or both.") as well as Philadelphia's community standards. Two of them were forwarded on September 26 and November 6 by Donald Wildmon, a United Methodist minister and director of the National Federation for Decency. The third was filed on October 27 by Mary Keeley, a mother of a 15-year-old Stern fan, who was directed to the FCC by Morality in Media. In one cited excerpt, Stern asked a caller if they ever had sex with an animal and replied with "Well, don't knock it. I was sodomized by Lamb Chop, you know that puppet Shari Lewis holds?" The same broadcasts aired in New York, but were not in question to the inquiry. (Note: The FCC responds to specific complaints, so a single station may be cited even if the same material in question aired on other stations. However, a letter of inquiry may be sent to other broadcasters who aired the same material.)

Mel Karmazin, the president of Infinity, defended Stern in a 44-page response filed on December 22, 1986. He argued that the show was "comedic in nature" but "undeniably provocative and controversial, thereby inescapably offensive to some persons of delicate sensibility", and suggested that "a handful of complaints...cannot establish a local standard for a major metropolitan area such as Philadelphia". Karmazin also noted that none of the complaints involved the seven dirty words, and included letters from listeners who supported WYSP's decision to carry Stern's program.

On April 16, 1987, the FCC concluded that Stern had aired indecent material several times. In some instances, his broadcasts "did not merely consist of an occasional off-color reference or expletive, but...a dwelling on sexual and excretory matters in a way that was patently offensive". No fine was imposed, since the FCC believed there may have been some uncertainty as to the reach of the Carlin case, and that its Section 1464 indecency provisions were applied for the first time in a number of years. Infinity was instead warned of the risk of fines or the loss of its broadcast license if violations occurred. The investigation caused the FCC to expand its indecency standard beyond the seven dirty words, to "language or material that depicts or describes, in terms patently offensive as measured by contemporary community standards for the broadcast medium, sexual or excretory activities or organs". As the comments cited in the initial complaints were made between 6:00 and 10:00 am, when there is a "reasonable risk that children may have been in the audience", they would be termed indecent, and therefore actionable, under the new definition.

Following the FCC's decision, Stern hosted a live "FCC Freedom Rally" among a crowd of 3,000 people at Dag Hammarskjöld Plaza. "The FCC wants to clean up the show...let them try...I'm going to continue to do what I do," he cried. The Arbitron ratings showed that Stern gained over 30,000 regular listeners in New York while losing half the number in Philadelphia. Fifteen national radio and television broadcasters including NBC, ABC, and CBS, joined Infinity in a petition demanding that the FCC provide better clarification on its new indecency guideline. In November 1987, the FCC established a "safe harbor" period which permitted material that would otherwise be considered indecent to air between midnight and 6:00 am.

== 1988–91: First Infinity fine ==
WJFK-FM in Washington, D.C. became the third Infinity station to air The Howard Stern Show in October 1988. Two months later, Anne Stommel of New Jersey mistakenly tuned her radio to hear Stern talk about having naked women in for an upcoming show. She recorded the "Christmas Party" broadcast on December 16 that featured a man playing the piano with his penis, a choir singing about gay sex to the tune of "White Christmas", and women being hypnotized to achieve orgasm. Under the referral of her senator and congressman, Stommel filed a complaint with transcripts and tape of the program. The FCC reviewed the evidence, and asked Infinity in October 1989 for an explanation as the material "may have violated [federal law] by including indecent programming during daytime hours". Karmazin argued that the term "patently offensive" in its new ruling was vague, and that the sexual references cited were no more offensive than daytime television shows Geraldo and Donahue, which used similar terms without repercussions.

Karmazin's response was rejected, and the three stations that aired the show received a Notice of Apparent Liability (NAL) (Note: The FCC will issue a broadcaster with a Notice of Apparent Liability (NAL) if it finds that, based on the evidence of a complaint, has apparently violated an indecency, obscenity or profanity rules. It contains its preliminary findings and the amount of the proposed fine. The broadcaster then has time to make a formal response in writing. After reviewing the reply, the FCC will either reduce, rescind or issue the original proposed amount. The broadcaster can challenge the FCC's decision.) worth $2,000 on November 29, 1990. The FCC noted the show contained "frequent and explicit" references to sexual activities and organs that were made in a "pandering and titillating" fashion. Karmazin contested in February and June 1991 to deny that the broadcast had violated Section 1464, to which the FCC rejected both arguments, and formally upheld a Forfeiture Order in 1992. (Note: Following the issuance of a NAL and the broadcaster's response, the FCC will issue a Forfeiture Order, which formally imposes the monetary sanction, if it concludes that the broadcaster has indeed violated its rules.) After two further petitions were denied, Karmazin stated in 1993 to take the matter to the United States district court. As he contested, additional complaints regarding Stern led to further NALs being issued.

== 1991–93: Greater Media, Americom and Infinity fines ==
Stern began to air on WJFK-AM in Baltimore and KLSX in Los Angeles, owned by Infinity and Greater Media respectively, in 1991. The show aired live on the West Coast from 3:00 am PST followed by a tape delay replay from 6:00 am PST. A complaint was sent to the FCC in February 1992 from Al Westcott, a listener in Torrance, California who supplied 60 hours of recordings and a 19-page single-spaced transcript. Upon review of his letter, Greater Media was issued with a NAL worth $105,000 for the "apparent wilful and repeated violation[s]" of the Section 1464 standard at hours when children may be in the audience. The FCC found comments that were actionable from 12 shows between October 30 and December 6, 1991, including those about masturbating to a picture of Aunt Jemima, rectal bleeding, a sexual fantasy with actress Michelle Pfeiffer, the shaving of pubic hair, paedophilia and the arrest of actor Paul Reubens for indecent exposure. Westcott hailed the fine as a "mammoth victory ... not for me and not against Howard Stern but purely on behalf of the children of the country". After the fine was issued it became apparent to some KLSX listeners that portions of the show were being edited. Executives at Greater Media admitted to have removed comments from the 6:00 am replay that they found questionable from the New York feed to avoid the risk of further fines as the "safe harbor" rulings came into effect at that time. A settlement was reached between the FCC and Greater Media in 1997 that involved the fine being paid and the complaint dismissed.

"Some could say this is a personal vendetta, some could say it's a crusade...I prefer to say I found something offensive and I'm committed to clean up the airwaves...Some people could look at it as if I'm targeting Howard Stern. He's just the most obvious, the most far-reaching and the most popular of the disc jockeys."

— Al Westcott in 1992.

In October 1992 the FCC asked Infinity if the material subject to the Greater Media fine aired on its affiliates WXRK, WYSP and WJFK-FM and if so, at what time. After Infinity claimed the shows did air between the hours of 6:00 and 10:00 am, the FCC acted on December 18 to issue a combined $600,000 NAL, rather than revoke its broadcasting licenses. Karmazin continued to appeal the FCC's decisions. "We have difficulties with the FCC, but I sincerely believe that Howard's show is constitutionally protected material," he responded. The FCC warned Infinity of the possible removal of its licenses if Stern continued to violate their indecency policies. Stern verbally attacked the FCC's chairman, Alfred C. Sikes by "praying" he would suffer a relapse of prostate cancer after Sikes had a tumour removed.

Westcott moved from California to Las Vegas, Nevada in early 1992, and continued to monitor the show when it aired on KFBI, owned by Americom Las Vegas, in November. He announced that month his intention to file a complaint to the FCC that cited 70 instances of "indecent statements, scenarios and song parodies" during Stern's first week on the station. Americom received a $73,750 NAL on August 12, 1993 for actionable indecency violations that aired on nine shows between November 10, 1992, and January 13, 1993. The FCC noted references of bowel movements, anal fissures, masturbation, the "Tribute to Vagina" segment from Stern's Butt Bongo Fiesta videotape, penises and a raunchy conversation with a Woody Allen impersonator. Infinity received a fine that totalling $500,000 on the same day for airing the same broadcasts on WXRK, WYSP, WJFK-FM and WJFK-AM. The FCC decided not to revoke its licenses as no actionable complaints about Stern were received since January 1993. Infinity had also reminded the FCC of its efforts since November 1992 to comply with the indecency rules that involved multiple "dump" mechanisms, monitoring of the show by station management and consultations with Stern and his staff. Infinity was informed however, that any future infractions over indecency would place its position as a licensee in question. In 2000, Americom's forfeiture was dismissed after "a significant amount of time" had passed since it was issued, including the broadcasts in question.

== 1993–94: Delayed Infinity purchases ==
In June 1993 it was agreed for Infinity to purchase KRTH in Los Angeles from Beasley Broadcast Group for $110 million, the highest price ever paid for a radio station. As an approval from the FCC was required for the transfer of licenses, the outcome was delayed while further indecency complaints about Stern were investigated. On February 1, 1994 the FCC acted upon a 2–1 vote to approve the deal. Commissioner James Henry Quello voted against it, as he believed an approval may have been misinterpreted as the FCC endorsing Stern. In addition to the approval the FCC agreed to the filing of a $37,500 NAL to Americom for further indecency violations on KFBI. The actionable complaints had cited references to the soiled underwear of Stern's wife, vibrators, pedophilia, and incest from September 30, October 6, and October 12, 1993. On the same day, a combined NAL worth $400,000 was issued to Infinity for airing the same broadcasts on WXRK, WYSP, WJFK-FM, and WJFK-AM. A segment from August 4, 1993 was also cited, where Stern detailed a sexual encounter between himself and his wife. As with its first, the FCC dismissed Americom's second forfeiture in 2000.

In 1994, a complaint sent to the FCC cited offensive material on two shows from December 6, 1993 and January 19, 1994 that aired on WWKB in Buffalo, New York. Upon review, Infinity received a collective $200,000 fine on May 20, with the four Infinity stations being given penalties of $50,000 each. The offending dialogue included talk of masturbation and a story from cast member Jackie Martling about vomiting during oral sex. During an industry seminar in 1994, Karmazin revealed that Infinity had spent over $3 million in legal expenses regarding Stern and the FCC. He refused to pay the fines set against the company because the FCC was "not clarifying the [indecency] rules...or telling us exactly what we did wrong...we think that it's wrong to take the cheaper way out [and pay the fines]."

== 1995–98: Infinity settles with the FCC ==
In a turn of events, a settlement was reached between Infinity and the FCC that dismissed all outstanding indecency cases on September 1, 1995. Infinity agreed to make two payments totaling $1.715 million to the United States Treasury as a "voluntary contribution" while its five indecency NALs were cleared from the FCC's record. An additional $9,000 was given to settle all pending complaints. Though Infinity admitted no wrongdoing in the agreement, Stern accused the FCC of extortion, and called the payout "the biggest shakedown in history ... the bullies have won. I lost. That means we all lost." Stern, however, praised his employer. "They fought as long as they could. Honestly, I don't know what I would have done in their shoes ... they got jerked around plenty." With its clean record with the FCC, Infinity announced on September 22, 1995 the purchase of seven radio stations owned by Alliance Broadcasting for $275 million that expanded its number of outlets to 34. The Howard Stern Show was syndicated to 26 stations across the country by December 1995.

Following Infinity's settlement with the FCC, a series of smaller NALs were issued. Benchmark Communications, the licensee of show affiliate WVGO in Richmond, Virginia, was fined $10,000 in October 1996 for two broadcasts. The first involved the discussion of a sexual encounter between Stern and his wife from October 23, 1995, while the second concerned a segment from June 3, 1996 whereby the father of pornographic actress Jenna Jameson identified his daughter's vagina from a selection of photographs. Benchmark found the forfeiture excessive, and argued that it had maintained a history of compliance with the indecency rules. In 1997, the FCC reduced the penalty to $6,000 and was paid off. EZ Communications paid a $12,000 NAL issued April 1997 for six indecency violations on WEZB in New Orleans, two of which originated from The Howard Stern Show — the Jameson photograph segment and a discussion that referred to rectal bleeding from March 7, 1996. In June 1997, Infinity received its first NAL since its 1995 settlement of $6,000 for airing the October 23, 1995, March 7 and June 3, 1996 broadcasts on WXRK in New York City. However, the FCC dismissed the forfeiture as a "significant amount of time" had passed since the shows at issue had aired.

In June 1998, Eagle Radio was fined $2,000 for a discussion about soiled female underwear from September 30, 1993 on KEGL in Dallas, Texas. That month, Clear Channel Communications received a $6,000 NAL for three of Stern's broadcasts from February 7, 14 and April 25, 1997 on KKND in New Orleans. Transcripts of the offending material cited talk of college hazing that involved a pig, vaginas, and a website on bestiality. Both companies paid off their respective fines.

== 2004–05: Super Bowl XXXVIII aftermath ==
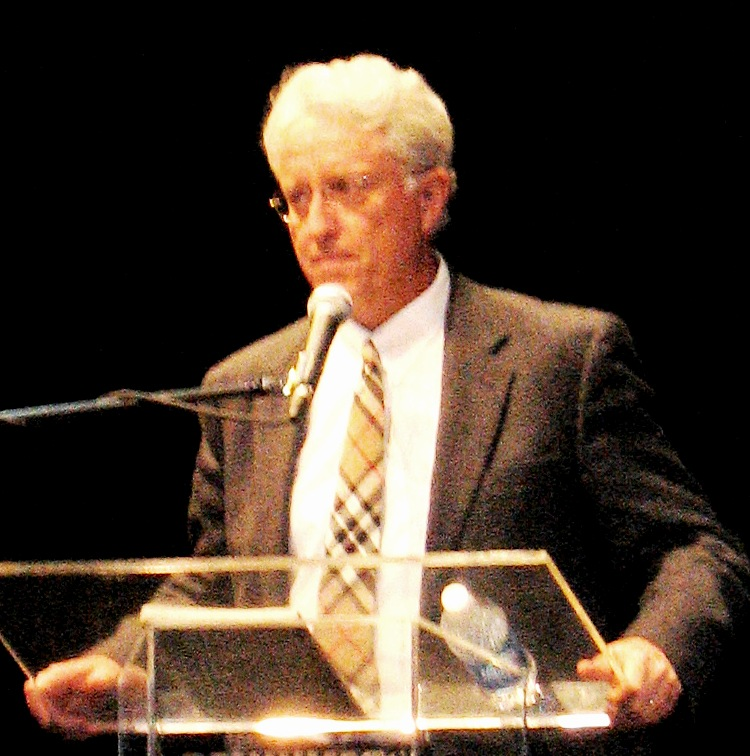
Jack Thompson

The Super Bowl XXXVIII halftime show broadcast on February 1, 2004, became notorious after Janet Jackson's breast was exposed by Justin Timberlake for less than a second. The resulting controversy triggered an immediate crackdown on perceived indecency in broadcasting. Radio and television managers responded with tighter controls over content, which Stern later said left him feeling "dead...inside" creatively.

In 2003, activist and attorney Jack Thompson supplied the FCC with show transcripts from April 9, 2003 on WBGG in Miami, Florida, a station owned by Clear Channel. Included were discussions of the sex life of show member John Melendez and talk of Sphincterine, a product for maintaining anal and genital hygiene. On April 8, 2004, Clear Channel was fined $27,500 for each of the 18 violations for a combined $495,000 NAL for airing the broadcast on its six stations that carried Stern – WBGG, WTKS, WTFX, KIOZ, WNVE and WXDX. The fine came six days after the FCC warned it would fine broadcasters per offensive utterance, rather than an entire broadcast. Clear Channel responded by dropping The Howard Stern Show permanently on its six stations. Stern's audience increased by 23% in Chicago and 22% in New York, and he regained the morning top spot in Los Angeles amongst listeners aged 25–54 for the first time since 1995. In June 2004, Clear Channel agreed to a $1.75 million settlement that resolved the fine and several other pending indecency investigations. The Howard Stern Show returned on nine new stations located in five of the six markets that Clear Channel had removed it from, on Infinity-owned outlets, a month later.

The FCC issued a $27,500 fine to Infinity on March 18, 2004, after a listener filed a complaint for the July 26, 2001 broadcast on WKRK in Detroit, Michigan over sexual and scatological references. In the transcript cited, Stern and cast members Robin Quivers and Artie Lange discussed what the sexual terms "blumpkin", "balloon knot", "nasty sanchez" and the "David Copperfield" meant. On November 23, 2004, station owner Viacom agreed to a consent decree worth $3.5 million to the FCC, the largest settlement reached with federal regulators. The deal covered 50 radio and television broadcasts that awaited investigation from the past five years. A provision contained in the agreement ordered the suspension of any Viacom employee should they receive a fine for a broadcast on its stations after December 23, 2004 that violated indecency laws. In effect, a single NAL could have removed Stern from the air while the investigation occurred. Thompson had sent complaints since Stern began on WQAM in Miami on August 15, 2004, but WQAM was not subject to the provision because the station was owned by Beasley Broadcasting. In August 2005, the FCC was investigating a complaint from Thompson regarding "The Stupid Bowl" contest from February 4, which involved women golfing with strap-on dildos on their foreheads and singing with sausages in their mouths. Though the complaint, which cited WQAM and Infinity's WXRK in New York, did meet the requirements of the consent decree provision it caused no further action.

On October 6, 2004, Stern announced that he had signed a five-year contract with Sirius Satellite Radio, beginning in 2006, on a platform not subject to the FCC's broadcast indecency rules. Later that month, Stern had an on-air exchange with Michael Powell, then chairman of the FCC, during an appearance on the Ronn Owens program on KGO. "I don't think that you personally hate me. I think what you've been doing is dangerous to free speech. I don't think it's just against me, I think things have gotten way out of control," Stern said when he called in. The Howard Stern Show aired for the final time on AM and FM radio on December 16, 2005. The fines issued by the FCC since 1990 had totaled $2.5 million.
