= Sour Shoes =

American comedian

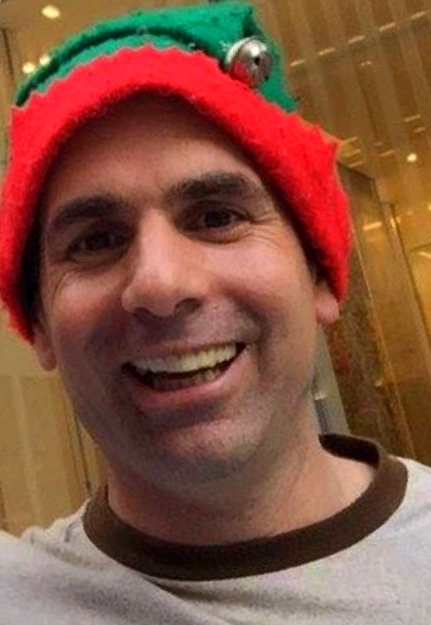
- Sour Shoes
- Born: Michael DelCampo; June 6, 1979 (age 47); Baldwin Place, New York, U.S.

Comedy career
- Years active: 2003–present
- Medium: Comedian, radio, musician
- Genres: impersonation, improvisational comedy, prank

Michael Christopher DelCampo (born June 6, 1979) known professionally as Sour Shoes or Mike from Mahopac, is a radio personality known for his impersonations and song parodies. Sour Shoes gained notoriety for calling into radio programs like The Howard Stern Show and Mike and the Mad Dog. In a 2014 article, Rolling Stone referred to Sour Shoes as a musical genius, and he is often accepted into the shows that he pranks, as in the case of Adam Carolla.

== Personal life ==
Sour Shoes grew up in Baldwin Place, New York and currently lives in Mahopac, New York. DelCampo revealed he had to live in his car during his days at college.

DelCampo works with Autism Speaks helping autistic children.

== Comedy ==
On June 5, 2003, DelCampo gained visibility as a comedic artist with his first appearance on The Howard Stern Show. According to the staff, Michael came to the station carrying instruments and skating on roller blades. Stern asked "What are you, a street musician?", which he confirmed, continuing with impersonations of mostly singers. Stern found him odd but many on the staff enjoyed his antics, particularly K.C. Armstrong. Stern once asked, "Are you bipolar?" and Sour Shoes jokingly replied, "I'm bicoastal from Malibu to Mahopac."

By 2005, Sour Shoes became a regular on the Stern show, including doing song requests.

DelCampo's quick comedic stylings of voice and improvisation are reminiscent of a young Robin Williams. Howard Stern has compared Sour Shoes to Rich Little.

DelCampo has popularized several catch phrases including "ooooo" and the word "noine", a play on how the word nine is pronounced by Howard Stern producer Gary Dell'Abate due to his accent, that his fans have since embraced in relation to the comedian.

=== Notable impressions ===
- Artie Lange
- Gary Dell'Abate
- Mike Francesa
- Gilbert Gottfried
- Don Imus
- John Sterling
- Suzyn Waldman
- Chris "Mad Dog" Russo
- David Lee Roth
- Richard Simmons
- George Takei
- Jackie Martling
- Bobby Valentine
- Sid Rosenberg
- Scott Ferrall
- Mariann from Brooklyn
- Ray Romano
