= Wack Pack =

Assortment of personalities heard throughout the history of The Howard Stern Show

The Wack Pack is the name given to an assortment of personalities heard throughout the history of The Howard Stern Show. As a parody of the Rat Pack or Brat Pack, Stern biographer Richard Mintzer has labeled them a key part of the show. Members tend to be unusual in some way: being blatantly racist, mentally disabled, having a comical appearance, voice or ability, or some combination thereof. As of 2023, twenty-two living individuals are designated "Wack Packers" (along with a number of deceased). Not every regular guest on or caller to the show is considered a member, nor are any of the show's staff members; Stern has stated that Wack Packers are not defined by having any disability or peculiarity, but by their inability to understand why they are funny.

Through their appearances on the radio show, some Wack Packers have gained notoriety for personal appearances around the country and occasionally, played roles in films and television programs.

== History ==
In the 1993 book Private Parts, Howard Stern lists early members of the Wack Pack, including Irene the Leather Weather Lady, who is essentially the first Wack Packer, having met Stern in May 1980 when he was broadcasting from WWWW in Detroit, Michigan. Upon the introduction of Fred the Elephant Boy on the radio show on November 28, 1988, among a collection of others, Stern began calling the group of show personalities the "Wack Pack" on July 6, 1990, as documented in Stern's The History of Howard Stern radio series. Since moving to Sirius XM Radio, Stern has offered some members of the Wack Pack their own shows.

== Official list ==
On February 24, 2015, Stern and crew voted on an "official" list of Wack Pack members.

=== Living Wack Packers ===
The following individuals are official Howard Stern Show Wack Pack members:

- Asian Pete
- Ass Napkin Ed
- Beetlejuice, named "Greatest Wack Packer of All Time" (Lester Green)
- Bigfoot (Mark Shaw, Jr., not to be confused with actor Matthew McGrory, who previously had the name "Bigfoot" on the show.)
- Debbie the Cum Lady
- Gary the Conqueror (Gary Loudermilk, previously known as Gary the Retard)
- High Pitch Erik (Erik Bleaman)
- High Register Sean (named in 2009)
- Jeff the Drunk (Jeff Curro, also known as Jeff the Bore)
- Jeff the Vomit Guy (Jeff Levy)
- John the Stutterer (not to be confused with former Howard Stern Show staff member and former Tonight Show announcer Stuttering John Melendez)
- Lenny Dykstra
- Mark the Bagger (Mark Rothenberger)
- Medicated Pete (Pete McHeffey)
- Melrose Larry Green
- Miss Howard Stern (Andrea Ownbey)
- Monotone Matt
- Siobhan the Transsexual
- Sour Shoes (Michael DelCampo)
- Tan Mom (Patricia Krentcil)
- Underdog Lady (Suzanne Muldowney)
- Wendy the Slow Adult (formerly Wendy the Retard)

=== Former Wack Packers ===
- Hanzi (Imran Khan) (permanently banned from show, April 2016)

=== "Not Wack Pack Material" ===
The following individuals were at one time considered Wack Pack members. However, since 2015, they were excluded by Stern and his staff from the Wack Pack for reasons including their ability to hold a job and function in society, while still having a funny or unusual personality.

- Angry Black
- Big Black
- Bobo (Steve Bowe). Bobo lost his name temporarily and was known as Steve from Florida. In June 2017, Bobo endured a humiliating act to win his name back on the show.
- Captain Janks (Tom Cipriano)
- Daniel Carver
- Eddie the Produce Guy
- Elegant Elliot Offen (permanently banned from show, 2006)
- Evil Dave Letterman
- Gay Ramón
- Ham Hands Bill
- Hate Man
- Hate Woman
- The Kielbasa Queen (Denise Miller)
- King of All Blacks (Lawrence Coward)
- Mariann from Brooklyn (Mariann Tepedino), considered the #1 super fan and den mother to the Wack Pack.
- Mick the Nerd (currently considered a candidate)
- Speech Impediment Man
- Vin the Retard
- Wheelchair Steve
- Wood Yi
- Yucko the Clown (Roger Black)

=== Deceased Wack Packers ===
The following individuals were determined to be Wack Pack members either by Stern and his staff or by other sources prior to their death:

- Angry Alice (formerly Crazy Alice)
- Bigfoot (Matthew McGrory)
- Blue Iris
- Celestine
- Cliff Palate (Lynn Zimmermann, also known as Lispy Lynn to North Texas listeners)
- Debbie the Space Alien (Debbie Tay, née Roach)
- Fran the Singing Psychic (Frances Baskerville)
- Fred the Elephant Boy (Fred Schreiber)
- George "Crackhead Bob" Harvey
- Eric the Actor (formerly Eric the Midget)
- Hank the Angry Drunken Dwarf (Henry J. Nasiff, Jr.)
- The Iron Sheik
- Joey Boots (Joseph Bassolino)
- Kenneth Keith Kallenbach
- Marfan Mike (Mike Diamond)
- Nicole Bass
- Riley Martin
