= Hank the Angry Drunken Dwarf =

American entertainer (1962–2001)

- Born: April 20, 1962; Fall River, Massachusetts, U.S.
- Died: September 4, 2001 (aged 39); Fall River, Massachusetts, U.S.
- Occupations: Entertainer, radio personality
- Height: 4 ft 1 in (124 cm)

Henry Joseph Nasiff Jr. (April 20, 1962 – September 4, 2001), better known professionally as Hank the Angry Drunken Dwarf, was an American entertainer. He appeared numerous times on The Howard Stern Show and on the televised studio segments which aired on the E! channel. He was a member of the show's Wack Pack. Hank's career began August 16, 1996, when he entered Stern's studio at radio station WXRK (K-Rock) in New York City. He was 4 ft 1 in (1.24 m) tall and weighed 95 lb (43 kg; 6.8 st).

Hank received widespread media coverage in 1998 when he won a People magazine online poll asking the public to vote for the most beautiful person in the world as part of the run-up promotion for the magazine's "50 Most Beautiful People" issue. When the public was given the option to submit a write-in candidate, the magazine had not counted on 230,169 votes for Hank the Angry Drunken Dwarf—beating out assorted celebrities by a wide margin. In third place was Leonardo DiCaprio, with 14,471 votes. In the early years of public participation on the Internet, media critics responded by wondering whether this was evidence of an emerging digital democracy.

== Early life ==
Henry Joseph Nasiff Jr. was born on April 20, 1962, in Fall River, Massachusetts. He was diagnosed with achondroplasia dwarfism a week after he was born. His mother, Claudette, taught him from a young age that he could do whatever he set his mind to do, and Hank learned to ride a bike and participated in Little League Baseball for several seasons. When Hank was twelve he had an operation on his legs to straighten them. Although doctors had said that he would eventually require more surgery, Hank put off doing it and ultimately opted to not undergo another operation.

Before being associated with The Howard Stern Show, Hank had a bit part in an ongoing performance of Finnegans Wake at a Boston dinner theater. Hank played a character who would pop up out of a beer keg at the end of each performance. He was paid $50 to say four lines of dialogue. The gig lasted two years.

== First Stern Show appearance ==
Hank met Howard Stern on August 16, 1996, after driving to New York City with a friend from the Boston dinner theatre. After a night of drinking, Hank was waiting outside the K-Rock studios in Manhattan at 5:30 am. He never had a doubt that he would make it onto the air. Stern's producer Gary Dell'Abate recalled arriving at work and encountering an obviously intoxicated dwarf who aggressively demanded that he be permitted to meet Stern:

There was a dwarf standing there, and I remember he was wearing a Hawaiian shirt and one of those Hawaiian leis. And he had a vodka bottle in his hand... and he was drunk beyond belief. And it really was like a gift for our show. It was like a gift fell out of the sky. He could go to Regis, he could go to Letterman, he could go to all those shows, and they'd have him arrested. And I said 'Howard, I just walked in and there's a drunken dwarf wearing a Hawaiian lei, with a vodka bottle.' And [Howard] said, 'Bring him in immediately.' He really found the right place.

Hank's first appearance that day included reading a series of one-sentence jabs against various groups and ethnicities which he had scrawled on a piece of paper the night before.

If they put your brain in a parrot it would fly backwards

— Hank replying to a Stern Show caller

Hank asserted from his first on-air conversation with Stern that he be referred to as a dwarf and not a midget, and was quick to correct anyone who violated this rule, viewing it as an issue of respect. The name of Hank's character came about spontaneously during his first appearance. During that day's show, Stern commented: "I've always wanted an angry, drunken dwarf on my program and now I've got one". A short time later he added, "Isn't this great? An angry dwarf, an angry drunken dwarf. Everything I've ever dreamed about."

From his first appearance until his death five years later, Hank the Angry Drunken Dwarf became a popular character on the show. Never afraid to express himself, Hank would come across completely unguarded. In terms of being belligerent, Hank's manager Doug Z. Goodstein explained that this tended to only occur when Hank was really drunk and people would heckle him. He described Hank "as a relatively soft-spoken polite guy who quite often had a big smile on his face." Behind Hank's public persona, an underlying "good nature" tended to shine through, which fans seemed to recognize. During the first few years, Hank would take the bus from Boston each month as soon as he got his SSI disability check. Hank was a member of the show's Wack Pack and soon attracted a large informal fan base.

Hank was not paid for his appearances on the show, but he said sometimes they would "slip [him] a little under the table." Adding, "What do I need money for anyway? People fight to buy me drinks."

== Most Beautiful Person poll ==
In May 1998, People Magazine conducted an online poll on their website asking the public to vote to determine the "Most Beautiful People" in the world as part of the promotion for their annual Spring issue. The film Titanic had been released the previous winter, and had a prominent position in American popular culture. There were indications that People's editors simply assumed that the film's leading star, Leonardo DiCaprio, would automatically garner the most votes.

The magazine also allowed readers to submit a write-in candidate. The suggestion to vote for Hank the Angry Drunken Dwarf started on a Stern fan website and was discussed on message boards, and Stern mentioned it on air a few times. Word started to spread and votes for Hank started coming into People Online at a rate of fifty per minute. The voting lasted a week, and by that Wednesday Hank had garnered 50,000 votes as a write-in candidate.

The following Tuesday, the official poll results were posted and Hank the Angry Drunken Dwarf had won by a landslide with 230,169 votes. DiCaprio's final tally was 14,471 votes (third place). In second-place was another write-in candidate, professional wrestler Ric Flair, with 17,145 votes. The executive editor of People was none too thrilled with the poll's outcome, stating, "Frankly, I think it's stupid."

When People's "50 Most Beautiful People" issue was released, DiCaprio appeared on the cover. (The magazine photographed Hank so that he was mentioned on their website along with the more famous runners-up).

Details of what had happened with the poll were picked up by various media; as one writer explained, "Voting for Hank offered people a chance to violate People's expectations while still playing by its rules". Some observers concluded that the reaction by the public to vote for Hank was a veiled commentary on how the media assumes that the masses are easily manipulated into liking what is marketed to them. The New York Times quoted a participant in the poll as stating, "The 'media' tells us what food to eat, what movies to see, what music to listen to, who to vote for politically and what kind of people are attractive enough to have relationships with!...Voting for 'Hank the Dwarf' is a reflection of how the people really feel about media!"

And some saw it as public recognition of Hank's "inner beauty." Hank himself often wondered what it all meant.

The sober Hank turned out to be a pretty good interview. He had a droll, deadpan sense of humor and the true performer's instinct for quick quips. "And, what color are your eyes?" I asked him. "Well, I don't know what color you'd call them. Brown, maybe hazel. No, wait. Bloodshot. You'd better say bloodshot."

— Excerpt from Salon magazine article

== Memorable appearances ==
Whenever Hank appeared on The Howard Stern Show inevitably he would be carrying a green plastic bottle of Sprite or some other soda mixed with vodka. He explained that it was so he could drink during the bus commute from Boston without getting hassled.

Hank would don a costume for some appearances, such as when he was an angel with wings and a halo; a leprechaun; or dressed as Superman.

On March 4, 1998, Hank dressed in a pink rabbit suit, took a succession of phone calls from Stern listeners, sang karaoke to Led Zeppelin songs, and blew a .375 on a breathalyzer test.

After the publicity generated by the online poll, Hank started appearing more often on the Stern Show. In June 1998, Hank was followed by the cameras of E! Entertainment Television as he was given a make-over. Hank had his 1970s-era hair cut at a salon; had a manicure; received an eye exam and new glasses; got fitted for a tuxedo; and was supposed to have his teeth cleaned at a dentist, but was too inebriated.

One of the producers from E! started managing Hank, and soon he was being offered various paying gigs to make appearances at bachelor parties, bars, strip clubs, etc. His manager related in an interview that "Hank was diligent in finding out every fine detail about his appearances and treated them with the utmost professionalism." Hank would be hired to sing karaoke, bartend, or hurl insults. He also started merchandising a line of T-shirts and key chains. Hank, once dependent on disability checks, was now making $5,000–7,000 per month. He had bought himself a new stereo, and was most excited about almost being out of credit card debt. When Hank was asked if he was worried that he was being exploited he replied: "No, and even If I am I don't care, I'm making money."

In 1999 Hank was hired by Interplay Entertainment to promote the developer's upcoming video game Messiah. Hank donned an angel costume and wandered the streets of various cities with a sign promoting the game. Several videos of these public events were eventually released as commercials to advertise the game.

On November 29, 2000, Hank again dressed up in his infamous bunny costume and was sent by Stern to disrupt extreme performer David Blaine during his Frozen in Time stunt. Speaking remotely through a portable microphone connection, Stern initially wanted Hank to urinate on the statue or streak by it. Not wanting to be incarcerated, Hank refused and instead gave Blaine the middle finger.

== Rock trivia contest ==
Hank was intelligent and had an exceptional knowledge of rock music trivia, especially 1960s–1970s rock music. In what many fans consider to be one of his most memorable appearances, on April 25, 2001, Hank competed against Stern producer Gary Dell'Abate in a rock music trivia contest (Dell'Abate was scheduled to be a contestant on VH1's Rock & Roll Jeopardy!). Despite being so inebriated that it was difficult for him to sit fully upright in his chair, Hank easily won the contest. Among the questions that Hank answered correctly included, "Who played keyboards on 'Let It Be'?"; and "Which group sang the song, 'Green-Eyed Lady'?" After the match was over, Hank insisted on lying down in the studio and passed out for several minutes. The segment was televised on the Howard Stern Show on E!, and has since aired on Howard TV on demand. During a later Stern show, Hank also competed against Sugar Ray lead singer Mark McGrath in a rock trivia contest, which Hank also won.

== Film and television ==
Hank was friends with actor Billy Barty and had auditioned for a part in the 1988 movie Willow in which Barty had a role as a benevolent wizard, but Hank did not get the part. Because of his friendship with Barty, Hank raised money every year for the Billy Barty Foundation to Benefit Little People.

Hank made at least one appearance on WWF Raw is War on May 25, 1998, being presented by The Jackyl as Oddities; and starred in a local commercial selling used cars.

In 2000, Hank played the role of "God" in the movie Citizen Toxie: The Toxic Avenger IV.

In 2000, Hank had a supporting actor role in the film Shoe Shine Boys playing a mustached felon named Leo Henry Williams. Actor Martin Landau saw the film and was so impressed with Hank's performance that he arranged a meeting and met Hank. (The film's title was later changed to Prank).

In 2001 Hank had a guest starring role in an episode of the FX network comedy Son of the Beach.

== Death ==
Hank would occasionally cut down on his drinking. During a Stern Show segment in August 1999 in which Howie Mandel was the guest, Hank explained that when he reduced his intake of alcohol it precipitated him to go into a seizure during an appearance in California.

In a documentary short that profiled Hank, his mother related how doctors had told her that Hank's liver was damaged, and that she did not know how long he had to live, and that she "didn't know what to do." Hank had been in rehab before, as well as court-mandated detox, and it had never worked. Once Hank was even kicked out of Alcoholics Anonymous because he brought a bottle of MD 20/20 to a meeting and started drinking it five seconds after the meeting started. Regarding trying to get Hank help for his alcoholism, Stern explained, "People always asked me if we tried to get him to stop drinking, and I said all the time we did..." Stern also related that there were employees of the show who tried to get Hank into programs.

Hank had related that he first tried alcohol when his grandfather had given him a taste of blackberry brandy when he was around seven or eight years old (his grandfather died when Hank was eight). Although the schtick of Hank the Angry Drunken Dwarf was that Hank drank because he was angry about being a dwarf, Hank had actually experienced significant trauma in his life as a child. On his first appearance on the Stern Show he related how he had been sexually abused by a male when he was seven years old (Hank explained that it was someone unrelated to him). Later, during another Stern appearance, when asked further about the incident, Hank said that the abuse was in the form of rape. As he got older he said that he almost took out lethal revenge against the perpetrator. When Hank reached adolescence, particularly around the age of fourteen, his drinking started to pick up, and he slowly started "to build up a tolerance".

Right now I wouldn't change if they had some kind of drug that would make me grow. Plus I'd lose my job. And I'd have to buy new clothes.

— Hank discussing being a dwarf

On the afternoon of September 4, 2001, Hank died in his sleep at the home he shared with his parents in Fall River. His mother discovered that he had died when she went to wake him. He was 39 years old. His death certificate listed his immediate cause of death as a seizure disorder, with ethanol abuse and chondrodystrophy as contributing factors. Hank is buried at the Notre Dame Cemetery in Fall River, Massachusetts. The next day, Stern devoted most of the show to Hank.

Hank's mother, Claudette, called into the Stern Show on September 10, 2001, to publicly thank everyone who attended Hank's funeral and wake. She also thanked everyone who emailed and sent their condolences. She told an anecdote about how someone in the family had put a can of beer in Hank's casket. She said that "someone else slipped a bottle of Jack Daniel's in under Hank's coat." She ultimately left the items in the casket because she said that is what Hank would have wanted.

== Aftermath ==
Talk of Hank's death in the media was cut short by the events of 9/11. Early in the 8 o'clock hour of the Stern Show on 9/11, Stern was interviewing an executive from the E! channel who said that they were going to produce an E! True Hollywood Story about Hank and that Hank actually had quite a few friends in the entertainment industry. (The first plane crashed into the World Trade Center at 8:46 am.)
