= Jeff Curro =

Member of The Howard Stern Show

- Born: May 2, 1967 (age 59); Berne, New York

Jeff Curro (born May 2, 1967), also known as Jeff the Drunk and Jeff the Bore, is a member of the Wack Pack on The Howard Stern Show.

Curro is a long-term chronic alcoholic and exhibits complications of chronic alcohol abuse. Long-term tobacco and marijuana abuse have also affected him. Due to a car accident in his youth, he has a paralyzed arm. The accident initially left him in a coma, with a broken neck and back requiring months of physical rehabilitation. He has resided in a trailer in Berne, New York, first with his mother, who died in 2006, then with a brother.

Curro first called into The Howard Stern Show in 1992 when the show first syndicated to a station in Albany, New York. In December 1998, he called in to play the "Aspiring Playmate" game (like the "Homeless Game"), and won a trip to Las Vegas. He became a regular guest on the show, and a member of the Wack Pack, known for his ability to become "spectacularly inebriated" before appearances on the show. Before his association with the show, Curro was described as "filled with self-loathing, scraping by with menial jobs", but since then, Curro stated, fans embraced him, "disabilities and all."

Upon the death of his mother in 2006, his popularity on the show resulted in an "outpouring" of sympathy from "hundreds" of show fans, who, along with Howard Stern, wrote in a guestbook hosted on the Albany, New York Times Union website. Appearing on the Stern show in 2007, Curro revealed his recurring "festering boil" on his rear; a photo of his "purplish, blistered buttocks" was posted on the Stern website that day. Curro said it first appeared following his 1986 car crash: "It swells up, drains, goes away for a couple months and comes back again." Both Stern, and a doctor who called in during the show, told Curro to "go to a hospital immediately." The diagnosis was a life-threatening carbuncle which had to be surgically removed.

As a Wack Packer, Curro has had paying "personal appearances", usually in bars. In 2006 a CD titled Jeff the Drunk Takes Manhattan was released with three versions, standard, enhanced, and "clean". Curro participated in the Howard Stern Show IQ test (7/29/10), and scored an 89, "one point away from normal". The doctor who administered the test speculated Curro's score may have been affected by his disability (right hand and arm) during portions of the test that involve the quick use of one's hands.

== Health issues ==
On August 4, 2017, Radar Online posted an article pertaining to Curro's recent hospitalization. The article cites the Aug 1, 2017 (Tuesday) live Howard Stern Show broadcast. Curro called the show and was "slurring his words" while waiting for a taxi to take him to the hospital. Curro has a history of alcohol, cigarette smoking, marijuana abuse, and a growing tumor in his throat that had to be removed in 2016; additionally, he has been suffering from a "hacking cough" the past year.

On August 14, 2017, Curro called into The Howard Stern Show with an update on his health and stated that he was diagnosed with COPD (chronic obstructive pulmonary disease) and sent home with oxygen to be used as needed.
