= Daniel Carver =

American white supremacist

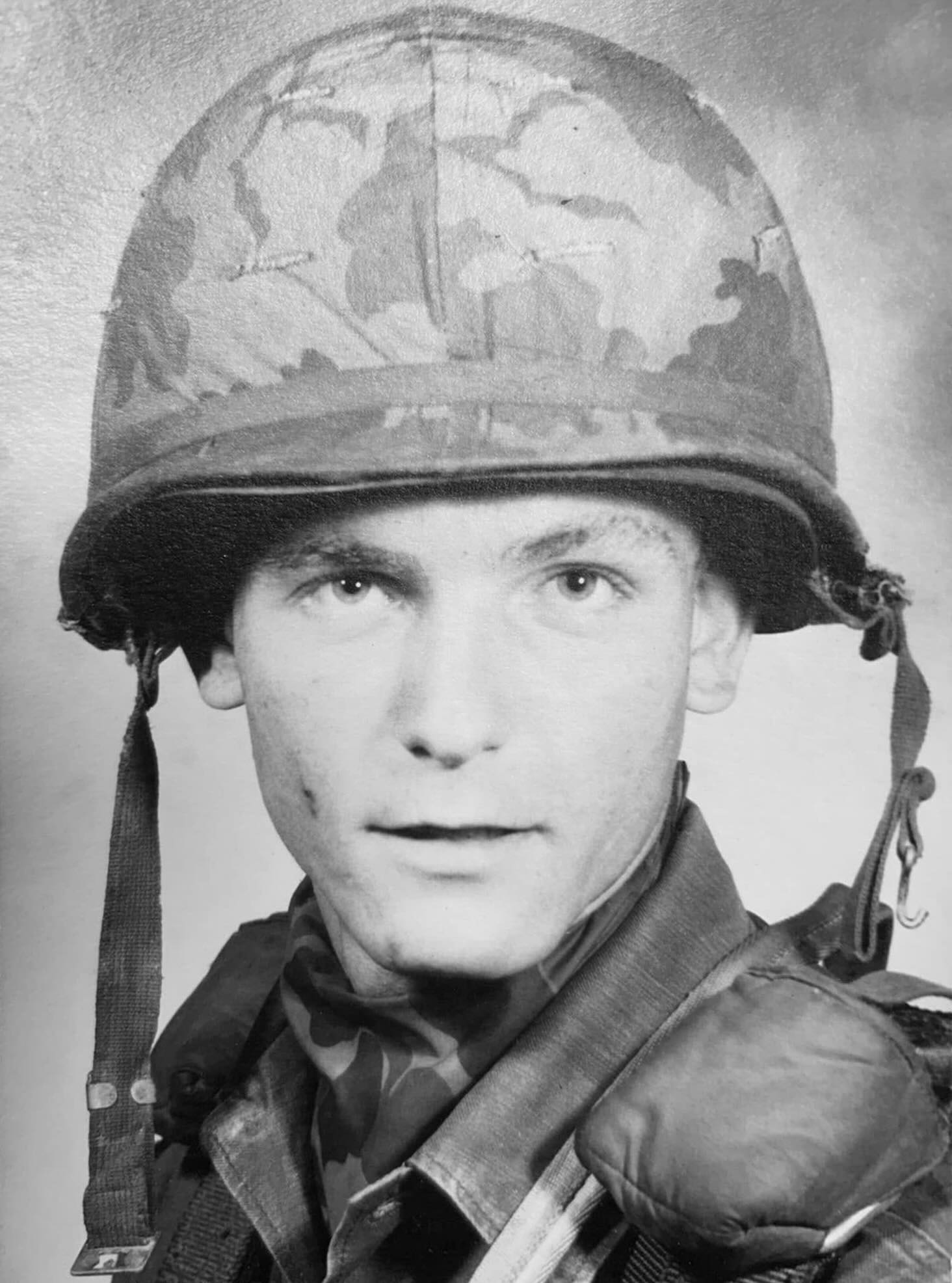
- Carver during his time of service, 1968
- Born: Daniel Carver; July 13, 1950 (age 76); Gainesville, Georgia, U.S.
- Spouse: Effie Darline (m. 1968; died 2024)
- Children: 4

Daniel Carver (born 13 July 1950) is a white supremacist and former Grand Dragon of the Ku Klux Klan chapter in Georgia. Carver was a frequent guest on television and radio programs including The Howard Stern Show, Geraldo, and The Jerry Springer Show, where he became noted for his catchphrase "Wake up, white people!"

== Early life ==
In 1968, Carver served in the Vietnam War. Carver was a carpenter for most of his life.

== Career ==
Starting in the 1980s, Carver ran a telephone "hotline" featuring daily messages for fellow Ku Klux Klan members and the general public, which were broadcast on air by Howard Stern due to the absurd and over-the-top nature of his many racist and demeaning statements toward black people, Jews, Mexicans, and homosexuals. In following years, Carver would become a frequent caller and guest on the show, featuring in segments in which he would review movies, give his thoughts on current events, and appear on game shows such as "Hollyweird Squares", where he was often the center square. On the show, he was considered a member of the Wack Pack and his famous line was "Wake up, white people!" In one segment, Carver reviewed the films Beloved and Don't Be A Menace To South Central While Drinking Your Juice In The Hood.

During Obama's 2008 campaign, Carver said: "I fought for this country, but I didn't fight so the nigger could be president." In 2009, Stern called him in to speak about Obama's inauguration, where he said, "The only reason he got in was the color of his skin." Later on in the call, he continuously used the word nigger to describe Obama and other black individuals. Stern claimed that he allowed Carver to frequent his show to make fun of his beliefs.

== Legal issues ==
In 1987, Carver was accused of participating in the harassment of 53 Black marchers by throwing rocks and bottles during their march. The 'Brotherhood March' walked through predominantly white Forsyth County. The KKK was fined $400,000, and Carver personally had to pay $30,000.

In 1988, he was brought before the State of Georgia Supreme Court on an act of terroristic threats. Carver and the KKK had a demonstration in Gainesville, Georgia in a predominantly black neighborhood and engaged in a verbal confrontation. He then reached into his robe and shouted, "Get back, I'll shoot." He then voluntarily paid $13,000 to the county. The other demonstrators included his wife and child along with another ten Klansmen. Carver was removed from the KKK after his terrorist court case. He was suspended from wearing the white KKK robes and attending demonstrations after 1988.

In 2009, Carver's son was arrested for drug trafficking and Carver was reportedly asked if he wanted an all white jury to which he said, "I don't know if it makes a lot of difference...in this country, you're better off being called a child molester than a racist." The arrest was made after finding a small amount of meth in the son's house.

== Personal life ==
On 4 June 1968, Carver married Effie Darline. Their marriage lasted 56 years until her death in 2024.
