= Celestine Tate Harrington =

American quadriplegic street musician

- Born: Celestine Tate; October 15, 1955; Philadelphia, Pennsylvania, US
- Died: February 25, 1998 (aged 42); Atlantic City, New Jersey, US
- Resting place: West Chester, Pennsylvania
- Occupations: Busking, author
- Notable work: Autobiography
- Height: 5 ft 1 in (155 cm)
- Spouse: Roy Harrington (m. 1991)
- Children: 4, including 2 adopted

Celestine Tate Harrington (October 15, 1955 – February 25, 1998) was an American quadriplegic street musician who was well known for playing the keyboard with her lips, teeth and tongue on the boardwalk in Atlantic City, New Jersey. Her 1976 child custody court battle with Philadelphia welfare officials gained national attention.

== Biography ==
Tate was born with arthrogryposis multiplex, which erodes connective tissue, and in her case, greatly reduced her limb development (also variously ascribed to an attempted abortion). Her parents deserted her early on, and she was raised by her grandparents, who also cared for her sister. She finished high school in 3 years. Unable to walk, she could crawl with a "hopping-like" motion using her undeveloped arms and legs. She met a nursing home aide in 1974, while she was in care at a rehabilitation center, and she gave birth in November 1975 to daughter Niya; the boyfriend had advised abortion, and was not around. Before the couple could marry, the boyfriend died.

When Niya was four months old, Celestine visited the Philadelphia Department of Public Welfare for assistance, but instead the social worker recommended that the child be removed, claiming that she could not be receiving adequate care. A week later the Common Pleas Court Judge Edward B. Rosenberg ordered the child's return. In the custody hearing Celestine "startled the courtroom" when she dressed and undressed Niya using only her lips, teeth and tongue. The judge also stated that the mother was "very sensible and has unusual mental capacity." In a Jet magazine article covering the court case, Celestine demonstrated typing 35 words per minute, handwriting, playing the organ, controlling a television, and taking complete care of her baby with her mouth. Her attorney commented, "The worst thing that could happen is the child could be spoiled." At the time, Tate was receiving Social Security and public assistance. Jet provided an address for readers to send notes and contributions. The magazine later reported receiving contributions and letters numbering in the "hundreds".

At the final custody hearing, the judge awarded Tate full joint custody with her grandparents under "protective supervision of the court", adding that he would personally visit the child. She had publicized her case on radio and television talk shows. Her attorney credited Jet readers for contributing to the court victory.

In January 1978, she announced plans to publish her autobiography, then titled All By Myself, with J.B. Lippincott & Co., and to "get out of this house ... find me a man and move to the suburbs." In the two years since the custody hearings, she had obtained sole custody of Niya, and by April, had moved out of her grandparents home to one a mile away, and had a new boyfriend. She stated Lippincott Co. had declined to publish, but a local publisher agreed. In 1979 she gave birth to Coronda Tate, by the new boyfriend.

Jet reported in late 1980 that Celestine had attempted suicide by overdose, due to difficulties finding a home, and publishers turning down manuscripts of her autobiography (then titled To Those Who Ask: Why Me?) as "too sad". She had been living with her aunt; her daughters were with other relatives.

Tate took music lessons for six months at Philadelphia's Settlement Music School disabled classes. Starting in the 1980s she performed on streets in downtown Philadelphia, then shifted venues to the Atlantic City Boardwalk, playing on a portable keyboard using her tongue. She reported that by 1983 she was receiving enough donations to support her family without public assistance.

She received "dozens of tickets" for violating a Boardwalk anti-panhandling ordinance. In 1986 she went to court, arguing that she was a self-employed musician, not a beggar, acting as her own attorney. She was convicted on eight counts of panhandling, but she performed an impromptu recital in the courtroom, and was applauded by the arresting officers. She was sentenced to eight hours of community service, and was required to obtain a permit. Later in 1986 she received 50 more citations and was convicted and fined on 18 counts. She went to court to challenge the constitutionality of the law, but her attorney had reached a settlement with the city to apply for a permit to solicit, as veterans do.

In 1988, she faced twelve new counts of playing without a permit, having never obtained the one previously agreed-upon. She stated that she earned enough to send her children to private school. The prosecutor was reported as saying, "she's a cunning and clever businesswoman." But in 1990, she was back in court for failing to pay the previously agreed-upon fine, which she freely admitted. The ordinance was repealed in 1992. In a 1998 interview she said the donations helped send her two daughters to college, and funded her occupational aides.

In 1991 she married Roy Harrington, a casino maintenance worker. Celestine's eldest daughter was married in 1996, as announced in Jet; the family appeared on the magazine's cover. At the ceremony, Celestine played "Love Story".

She finally published her autobiography in 1996, entitled Some Crawl and Never Walk with Dorrance Publishing Co., a subsidy publisher, with funding by Evander Holyfield.

In December 1997 Celestine began work for a McDonald's restaurant, taking telephone orders and distributing flyers. She operated her computer with a special device, and increased telephone order volume substantially, according to the franchise owner.

== Appearances ==
Celestine appeared on daytime television talk shows hosted by Oprah Winfrey, Sally Jesse Raphael and Geraldo Rivera, and several radio shows, including The Howard Stern Show, on which she said she appeared six times.

== Music ==
Her daily street performances, in front of Bally's Park Place casino and Caesars, included "Stormy Weather", "Amazing Grace", "Somewhere Over the Rainbow", "Born Free", and patriotic hymns like "America the Beautiful" and other religious tunes. In Celestine's first telephone appearance on the Howard Stern Radio Show in 1989, Howard listened to her play music, then invited her to play tennis for the upcoming October 7, 1989 "U.S. Open Sores" live event. Appearing before 16,000 fans at the Nassau Veterans Memorial Coliseum, Celestine performed The Star-Spangled Banner with her tongue.

== Death ==
On February 19, 1998, two colliding cars struck her as she traveled down an Atlantic City street on her motorized gurney. She received massive head injuries, and succumbed six days later. She was 42. 200 people attended the procession and memorial service at Bally's.
