= Actionable indecency =

American legal doctrine

Actionable indecency is a legal doctrine held by the Federal Communications Commission since the 1978 FCC vs. Pacifica case, that broadcast speech can be regulated even if it does not contain the seven dirty words deemed "indecent".

The FCC states on its website that indecent broadcasts are not actionable between 10 PM and 6 AM; however, in 1987, it announced that "actionable indecency" had been committed in broadcasts after 10 PM.

== Criticism of legal basis ==
The new definition of the "profane" is either co-extensive with indecency and therefore unnecessary, or so ambiguously more expansive as to pose even greater vagueness and overbreadth problems than the definition of indecency.

— Levy 2008

Legal scholars have questioned the constitutionality of the doctrine, and indicated that it has been used to silence minorities such as gay men in the past. One legal analysis of the doctrine found that it may no longer be necessary for the FCC itself to exist in order to protect children in the age of new media.

== See also ==
- Cause of action
- Actionable Offenses: Indecent Phonograph Recordings from the 1890s
