= F Jackie =

Live album by Jackie Martling
- Released: August 22, 2000
- Recorded: May 12 and 13, 2000
- Genre: Comedy
- Length: 77:46
- Label: Oglio Records
- Producer: Jackie Martling

Jackie Martling chronology
The Very Best of Jackie Martling's Talking Joke Book Cassettes, Vol. 1 (1999)	F Jackie (2000)	Joke Master Jr.: For Ages 3-12 (2006)

F Jackie is an album by American comedian, comedy writer and radio personality Jackie Martling. The album was released on August 22, 2000, on the Oglio Records label. By Martling's own account, it is the raunchiest of his many recordings. The album's title is from a catchphrase fans/callers would say on The Howard Stern Show before hanging up. The "F" was used because swearing wasn't allowed on terrestrial radio.

== Track listing ==
1. Shouters & Specials
2. Fixers & Fighters
3. Invaders & Interjectors
4. Knobs & Gnashers
5. Lizards & Loungers
6. Imbibers & Idiots
7. Dooties & Deception
8. Scavengers & Servers
9. Coffins & Calculus
10. Pesterers & Pushers
11. Curers & Carnivals
12. Smoochers & Smellers
13. Tasters & Toters
14. Partners & Posers
15. Travelers & Tube Steaks
16. Boozers & Bungholes
17. Chokers & Chewers
18. Sharers & Soloists
19. Halitosis & the Handicapped
20. Cornholers & Confederates
21. Taverns & Transplants
22. Dunkers & Delicacies
23. Donors & Disgust

== Background ==
In 1979, Martling issued his debut LP, What Did You Expect? He released two more albums, 1980's Goin' Ape! and 1981's Normal People Are People You Don't Know That Well. Martling sent all three records to fledgling New York City disk jockey Howard Stern. By 1986, he was a full-time member of Stern's show, later becoming the program's head writer. Martling maintained a steady schedule of live dates while working with Stern, recording Sgt. Pecker, Hot Dogs + Donuts, and The Very Best of Jackie Martling's Talking Joke Book Cassettes, Vol. 1. F Jackie is the fifth CD from Martling's Stern era.

== Description ==
F Jackie was recorded live at The Comedy Place in Andover, Massachusetts on May 12 and 13, 2000.

While most of the album's material is dedicated to telling jokes in his trademark manic, high-pitched style, Martling begins the album by insulting audience members and ripping hecklers without mercy. He relates one such instance in an interview:

The funniest stuff on my CD F Jackie was after a guy yelled, 'Nice shirt.' Then I went off with: ‘Yeah, I know. Your mom got it for me because I made her come faster than Dennis Rodman. Is she working tonight, or is she resting her snatch? You ever see her? Her pussy lips are so swollen that the crotch of her panties looks like Jiffy Pop. She's got a clit the size of a Pez, and it glows like a firefly. Go shit yourself a twin sister.’

Martling's comedic delivery is sharp and rapid-fire, relying on a stream of consciousness technique which is tailored to individual audiences.

== Critical reception ==
Fans and journalists alike testify unanimously to the album's filthy content. A listener's ambivalence toward Martling's dirty jokes must inevitably contend with, and make allowances for, a world that is not perfect, as one review explains:

Some of these moments are old Tasteless Jokes stand-bys (such as the Helen Keller material – I loved these jokes as a kid), some of them are modern-day (including a few jokes at the expense of President Clinton and his escapades a few years back), and some of them are good ol'-fashioned ethnic jokes that are incredibly non-P.C. today. Well, you know what? Fuck being politically correct. If you can't laugh at yourself (and Martling even includes some self-deprecating humor to prove this) and each other's foibles, then you may as well be dead.

While Martling's humor is famously off-color and his reputation as a comedian is firmly established in the entertainment industry, there is a caveat for those fans that are unacquainted with his comedic performances:

Martling's near-shrieking delivery and relentlessly fast tempo may wear some listeners down over the course of 70-plus minutes.

== Reviews ==
- Daily Vault: A− link
- Allmusic link (US)
