= Jackie Martling =

American comedian

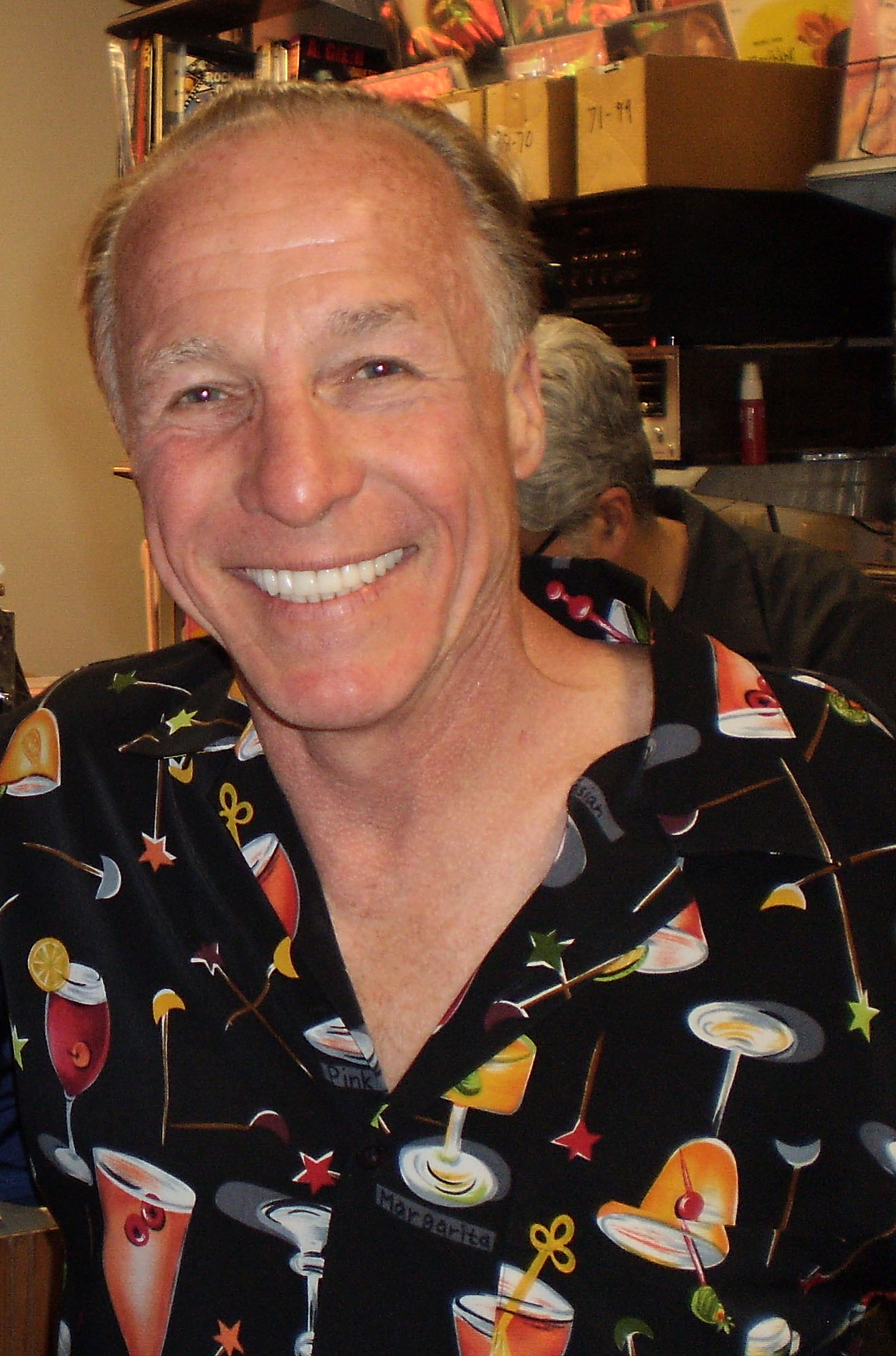
- Martling in May 2010
- Born: John Coger Martling Jr. February 14, 1948 (age 78); Mineola, New York, U.S.
- Other name: The Joke Man
- Education: Michigan State University (BS)
- Occupations: Stand-up comedian, writer, radio personality, author, actor, musician
- Spouse: Nancy Sirianni (m. 1988; div. 2008)

Comedy career
- Years active: 1979–present
- Medium: Stand-up comedy, radio, television, film
- Website: jokeland.com

John Coger "Jackie" Martling Jr. (born February 14, 1948) is an American stand-up comedian, writer, radio personality, author, actor, and musician also known as Jackie the Joke Man. He is best known as a former writer and in-studio comedian for The Howard Stern Show from 1983 to 2001.

Born and raised on Long Island, New York, Martling began a career in stand-up comedy in 1979, developing a blue comedy act in local venues. He self-produced his first of three comedy albums, What Did You Expect? (1979), during this time. After becoming involved with Rick Dees's radio show as a regular joke feature, Martling sent his albums to New York City radio personality Howard Stern, who invited him as a weekly guest and writer in 1983. This led to his hiring as head writer from 1986 to 2001. He released further albums during his tenure, including Sgt. Pecker (1996), Joke Man (1996), Hot Dogs + Donuts (1998).

Since his departure from The Howard Stern Show, Martling has undertaken various projects, including acting roles in television and film, and continues to perform stand-up. From 2006 to 2014, he was the host of Jackie's Joke Hunt on Sirius XM Satellite Radio, on Howard Stern's channel. He released his first music album, Happy Endings (2008). Martling has written two books, Disgustingly Dirty Joke Book (1998) and The Joke Man: Bow to Stern (2017).

== Early life ==
Martling was born on February 14, 1948, in Mineola, New York, a village on Long Island. The eldest of four children, he is of English, French, and Dutch ancestry. Martling took up music at seventh grade and spent time as a gymnast in his youth. He attended James H. Vernon School in East Norwich, New York, followed by Oyster Bay High School and, in 1971, earned a mechanical engineering degree from Michigan State University. After graduating, he stayed in East Lansing, Michigan, for a further two years. During his time in college, Martling was the singer and guitarist in a band. He quit the group and spent six months in Denver, Colorado, working in construction.

== Career ==
=== Early career ===
After returning to New York, Martling became the singer and guitarist in The Off-Hour Rockers alongside guitarist Chris Bates and keyboardist Herbie Werner, whom he incorporated jokes, banjos, and the kazoo with in the band's sets. He also performed solo shows and told jokes during his act. In order to accommodate the band's gear, Martling drove a used hearse. Martling began taking stand-up comedy more seriously in 1976, after he attended an open-mic night at Catch a Rising Star comedy club in New York City. "The auditioner bailed out early and the MC wasn't in the room, so I jumped on stage and told a joke, one that I was sure the entire world knew. The MC, David Sayh, came back in the room and saw me up there but let me finish". Sayh encouraged Martling to continue performing as a joke teller, and soon found out that "few people knew any of the zillions of jokes I knew".

By 1979, Bates and Werner disbanded the Off Hour Rockers to start a new group. At that point, Martling started to pursue stand-up comedy full-time, developing his stage act of songs and dirty jokes. During a gig at My Father's Place in Roslyn, New York, Martling met the likes of comedians Eddie Murphy, Rob Bartlett, and Bob Nelson who would perform for several minutes at Martling's gigs. In 1979, he set up a "dial-a-joke" telephone line from his parents' attic, Jackie's "Use Your Finger! (516) 922-WINE", which remains in operation to this day. Also in 1979, Martling released his first comedy album, What Did You Expect?! (1979), which he recorded himself using his own recording equipment. This was followed by Goin' Ape! (1980). Martling made a breakthrough in 1981 when Dave Lipson, writer and producer of Rick Dees's morning radio show on KIIS in Los Angeles, discovered his joke line and played his daily joke updates on Dees's program. The exposure led Martling to star in a designated joke segment for Dees, who went on to give Martling his nickname, "The Joke Man". Also in 1981, Martling released his third album, Normal People Are People You Don't Know That Well (1981).

=== The Howard Stern Show ===
Martling first heard of radio personality Howard Stern in August 1982 when the owner of Washington, D.C.'s Garvin's comedy club, where Stern had occasionally broadcast from during his time at WWDC (DC-101), suggested to Martling that he send his comedy albums to the recently fired radio DJ who had since landed at WNBC in New York City. By early 1983, Martling had mailed his three comedy albums to Howard Stern, then less than a year into his stint in afternoons at WNBC. Stern took a liking to Martling's material and invited him on as a guest in February 1983, which soon turned into a weekly guest spot without pay. Stern then began a regular segment titled "Stump The Comedian", a contest where callers were challenged to start a joke that Martling had to provide the punchline to, otherwise they win prizes.

In 1985, following the show's cancellation from WNBC, Stern stayed in New York City and relocated to afternoons on WXRK. Martling was subsequently hired as a writer on The Howard Stern Show when it moved to the mornings slot in February 1986, initially for two days a week. After around two months, Martling was hired full-time and became known as the head writer who would take lines written by himself and sound effects and producer Fred Norris and "determine what goes in front of Howard". Along with Norris, Martling contributed material to radio bits and song parodies and is featured and credited on Stern's television shows, home videos, and albums. In 1994, a puppet that resembled Martling, known on the show as the "Jackie puppet" and voiced by show impressionist Billy West, began to feature on the newly-launched Howard Stern television program on the E! channel.

Martling would release further albums during his time on the show, including Sgt. Pecker (1996), Joke Man (1996), Hot Dogs + Donuts (1998), and F Jackie (2000).

From late 1997 to early 1998, Martling was absent on the show for six weeks while his contract with WXRK owner Infinity Broadcasting Corporation was being renegotiated. During this time, he refused to be filmed on the E! television show until he had also secured a contract from the channel. Martling had taken time off to negotiate his contract "three or four times" throughout his time on the show.

In February 2001, Martling made history when he became the first comedian to perform at the B.B. King Blues Club in New York City.

On March 5, 2001, Stern announced Martling's departure from the show after negotiations fell through once more. Martling, who was earning $578,000 at the time, asked for a salary that averaged $1 million per year over the next five years. He declined the station's final offer of $650,000 on the advice of his lawyer. Martling twice attempted to accept the offer once the deadline to accept had passed, and he was declined. He has since added other reasons to his departure, including his inability to sleep and perform effectively for the show, having to announce his failing marriage on the air, and the inability to address his alcohol abuse had he continued. In August 2001, a newspaper reported his wish to return, but Stern declined, partly due to the Win Jackie's Money contest he had already started, which involved comedians auditioning for Martling's place in the studio by sitting in on some shows. In October 2001, comedian and actor Artie Lange replaced Martling for a tenure that lasted until December 2009.

Following his departure, Martling returned as a guest during the show's final week on terrestrial radio prior to its relocation to Sirius Satellite Radio, on December 15, 2005. He returned to the show on Sirius on March 13, 2007, and has since returned in the studio and by phone. A two-day special on Martling's time on the show titled Stern Spotlight: Jackie Martling aired in May 2007.

=== Later career ===
Since 1993, he has released six 78-minute dirty joke CDs, three videos, a DVD (A Safe Distance from Genius), five joke books including 1998's best-selling Simon & Schuster title, Jackie "The Joke Man" Martling's Disgustingly Dirty Joke Book, and the iPhone app The Jackie Button. He also co-created a line of electronic joke products with EB-Excalibur, and their MiniJokeMaster Jr. keychain is sold through various retailers.

Martling has appeared in many films during his career, including the comedy documentary The Aristocrats (2005), Mail Order Bride (2008), Venus & Vegas (2010), and White Irish Drinkers (2010). He appeared in the short film Jokebitch (2005). Martling received a Best Supporting Actor Award at the New York International Independent Film & Video Festival. He appeared on the TNT television show Leverage and in August 2007, Martling filmed the pilot episode for the sitcom The Pikers.

On October 3, 2006, Martling returned to radio as the host of a weekly, one hour comedy show, Jackie's Joke Hunt, on Stern's channel Howard 101 on Sirius. Martling's co-host was a fellow member of the Friar's Club, Ian "McKean" Karr. The final episode, "The Last Lick Hunt", aired on November 25, 2014, after 402 shows. Martling can also be heard on the Sirius comedy channel Raw Dog Comedy.

Martling released his first music album, Happy Endings, in 2007, co-produced by guitarist Frank Vignola. From October 27 to November 4, 2008, Martling and American Idol runner-up Bo Bice entertained American troops in Kuwait and Iraq. In 2010, Martling wrote and performed a one-man show for a run in New York City titled JokeLand on Broadway. In 2012, he appeared in Fred Carpenter's Send No Flowers, the short film My Cross to Bear, and voiced two puppets in the human/puppet film The Fuzz.

Martling's second book (an autobiography), The Joke Man: Bow to Stern, was released on October 24, 2017. Lange, who replaced Martling on The Howard Stern Show from 2001 to 2009, wrote the book's foreword.

Martling posts a joke on his Twitter account every day at 4:20 p.m.

== Personal life ==
From 1988 to 2008, Jackie Martling was married to Nancy Sirianni, though they were separated for years before they formally divorced. Their personal life as well as her appearances and call-ins to The Howard Stern Show contributed greatly to their popularity and put Jackie and Nancy in a spotlight they had not previously enjoyed. Nancy Sirianni's musical endeavors with her band, The Scoldees (and before that her bands All Folked Up and Big Orange Marble), were played on Stern's radio show and discussed by Howard and his staff. In 2008, Martling and Sirianni continued their professional association with an Off-Off-Broadway Broadway Game Show called "Play With Jackie." Martling also had a cameo in a 1990 low-budget horror movie Nancy starred in called Ghoul School, which became another punchline for Stern.

== Discography ==
Comedy albums

- What Did You Expect? (1979)
- Goin' Ape! (1980)
- Normal People Are People You Don't Know That Well (1981)
- The Joke Man (1993)
- Sgt. Pecker (1996)
- Come Again? (1997)
- Hot Dogs + Donuts (1998)
- The Very Best of Jackie Martling's Talking Joke Book Cassettes, Vol. 1 (1999)
- F Jackie (2000)
- Joke Master Jr.: For Ages 3–12 (2006)
- Gross Master Junior: For Ages 12–16 (2006)
- Snart (2010)

Music albums

- Happy Endings (2008)

== Bibliography ==
- Jackie "The Joke Man" Martling's Disgustingly Dirty Joke Book (1998)
- The Joke Man: Bow to Stern (2017)
