= Sgt. Pecker =

Studio album by Jackie Martling
- Released: November 5, 1996
- Recorded: March 17, 1995
- Genre: Comedy
- Length: 70:52
- Label: Oglio Records
- Producer: Jackie Martling

Jackie Martling chronology
Normal People Are People You Don't Know That Well (1981)	Sgt. Pecker (1996)	Joke Man (1996)

Sgt. Pecker is an album by American comedian, comedy writer and radio personality Jackie Martling. The album was released on November 5, 1996 on the Oglio Records label.

== Track listing ==
1. Meatballs & Monkeys
2. Canines & Canyons
3. Rags & Racers
4. Habits & Heroes
5. Myths & Moms
6. Trips & Traps
7. Pigs & Pee
8. Herds & Hookers
9. Lovers & Litters
10. Diapers & Diggers
11. Stoppers & Stingers
12. Fowls & Fatsos
13. Digits & Dweebs
14. Dinosaurs & Daddies

== Background ==
In 1979, Martling issued his debut LP, What Did You Expect? He released two more albums, 1980's Goin' Ape! and 1981's Normal People Are People You Don't Know That Well. Martling sent all three records to fledgling New York City disk jockey Howard Stern. By 1986, he was a full-time member of Stern's show, later becoming the program's head writer. Martling maintained a steady schedule of live dates while working with Stern, recording Joke Man, F Jackie, and The Very Best of Jackie Martling's Talking Joke Book Cassettes, Vol. 1. Sgt. Pecker is the second CD from Martling's Stern era.

== Critical reception ==
Sgt. Pecker made its appearance some ten years into Martling's stint as head writer for The Howard Stern Show and offered radio listeners who had not seen the "Joke Man" deliver jokes in person certain access to a seasoned comic performer. Stephen Thomas Erlewine gives a new listener requisite perspective on the album, suggesting it has its merits:

While there aren't as many outright hilarious jokes as on its predecessor, Sgt. Pecker is nearly as good as Jackie Martling's first opus, Joke Man. Boasting a wide array of bathroom, sex and scatalogical [sic] jokes, there's something here to offend everybody, but there's also enough unexpected twists and punchlines to make much of the album truly funny as well. If you like your humor raunchy, you're unlikely to be disappointed by Sgt. Pecker.

== Reviews ==
- Allmusic link
