= The Very Best of Jackie Martling's Talking Joke Book Cassettes, Vol. 1 =

Studio album by Jackie Martling
- Released: November 2, 1999
- Genre: Comedy
- Length: 72:35
- Label: Oglio Records

Jackie Martling chronology
| Hot Dogs + Donuts (1998) | The Very Best of Jackie Martling's Talking Joke Book Cassettes, Vol. 1 (1999) | F Jackie (2000) |

Professional ratings
Review scores
| Source | Rating |
|---|---|
| Allmusic | 4/5 stars |

The Very Best of Jackie Martling's Talking Joke Book Cassettes, Vol. 1 is an album by American comedian, comedy writer and radio personality Jackie Martling. The album was released on November 2, 1999 on the Oglio Records label.

== Track listing ==
1. Lids & Lads
2. Ghosts & Gunk
3. Guzzlers & Gringos
4. Dopes & Danglers
5. Bags & Beasts
6. Jilters & Jerkers
7. Squawkers & Salamis
8. Superiors & Stuffers
9. Potions & Preachers
10. Sewers & Swiggers
11. Pissers & Parkers
12. Sippers & Soakers
13. Mobsters & Monarchs
14. Fools & The Faithful
15. Callers & Coaxers
16. Bunnies & Blockers
17. Smilers & Swatters
18. Wankers & Wipers
19. Cheaters & Chompers
20. Shoppers & Sisters
21. Fool's Gold

== Background ==
In 1979, Martling issued his debut LP, What Did You Expect? He released two more albums, 1980's Goin' Ape! and 1981's Normal People Are People You Don't Know That Well. Martling sent all three records to fledgling New York City disk jockey Howard Stern. By 1986, he was a full-time member of Stern's show, later becoming the program's head writer. Martling maintained a steady schedule of live dates while working with Stern, recording Sgt. Pecker, F Jackie, and Hot Dogs + Donuts. The Very Best of Jackie Martling's Talking Joke Book Cassettes, Vol. 1 is the fourth CD from Martling's Stern era.

== Description ==
The album is a reissue of the first volume of the earliest recordings from "America's favorite joker". The CD includes 21 tracks, including the song 'Fools Gold' as heard on The Howard Stern Show.
