= What Did You Expect? (Jackie Martling album) =

Studio album by Jackie Martling
- Released: September 12, 1979
- Genre: Comedy
- Length: LP
- Label: Off Hour Rockers
- Producer: Jackie Martling

Jackie Martling chronology
| What Did You Expect? (1979) | Goin' Ape! (1980) |

What Did You Expect? is an album by American comedian, comedy writer and radio personality Jackie Martling. The album was released on Martling's Off Hour Rockers label on September 12, 1979.

== Track listing ==
1. Lipstick on My Dipstick
2. The Saran Wrap Stomp
3. If You Knew Suzie Like I Knew Suzie
4. Legs Are A Girl's Best Friend
5. I Laid My Peach on the Beach and Got Sand in the Fuzz
6. You Can Pick Your Nose and You can Pick Your Friends
7. I've Grown Accustomed to My Fist
8. The Ballad of the Dated Divorcee
9. She Can't Wrestle
10. The Enlisted Bed Wetter's Waltz

== Background ==
In 1979, Martling issued his debut LP, What Did You Expect? He released two more albums, 1980's Goin' Ape! and 1981's Normal People Are People You Don't Know That Well. Martling sent all three records to fledgling New York City disk jockey Howard Stern. By 1986, he was a full-time member of Stern's show, later becoming the program's head writer. Martling maintained a steady schedule of live dates while working with Stern, recording Sgt. Pecker, F Jackie, and The Very Best of Jackie Martling's Talking Joke Book Cassettes, Vol. 1.
