= Louis C.K. filmography =

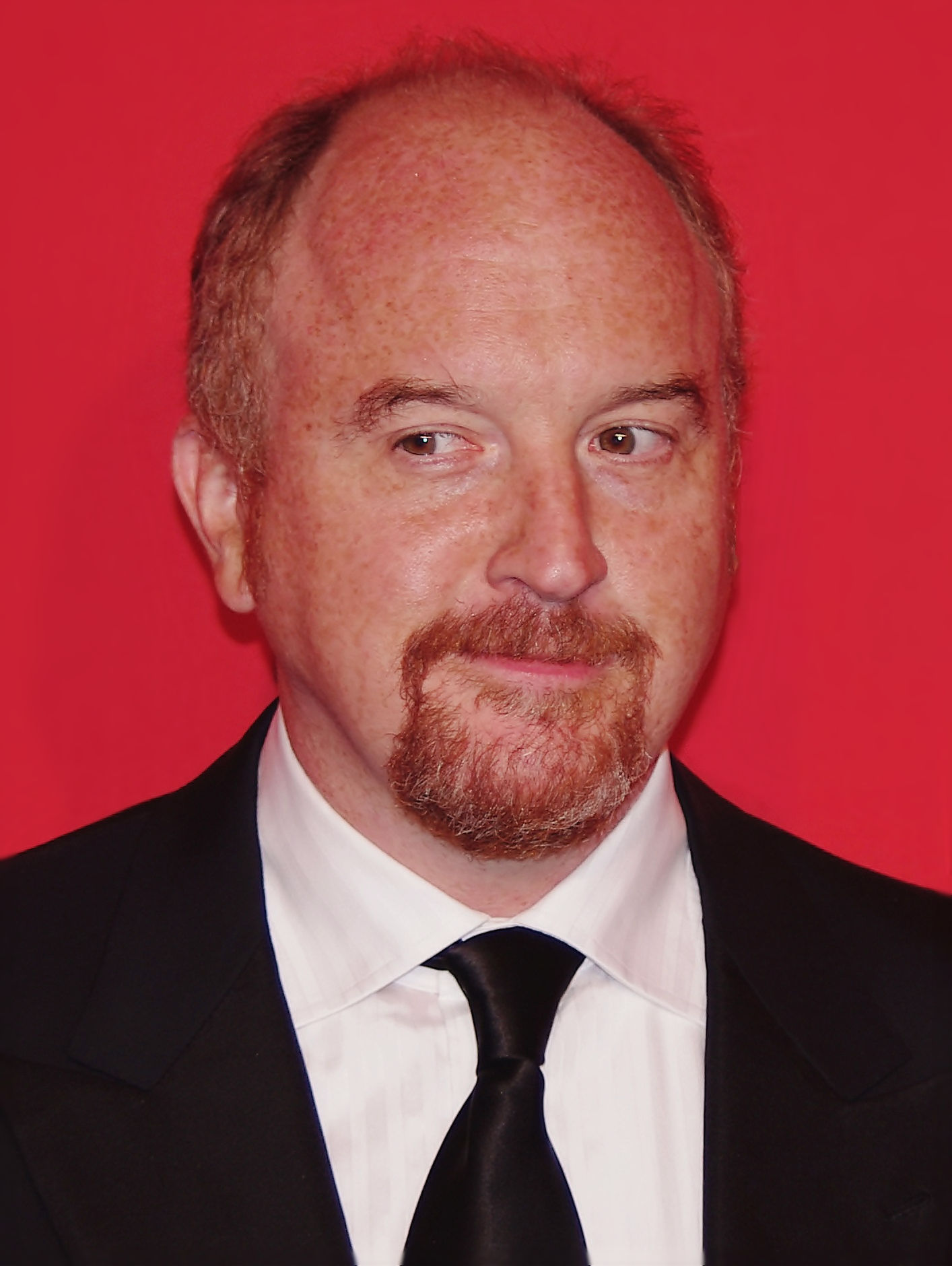
- C.K. at the 2012 Time 100 gala
- Film: 31
- Television series: 30
- Web show: 21
- Documentary: 10

American stand-up comedian, actor, writer and filmmaker Louis C.K. began his career performing stand-up while simultaneously making short films. When he was 17, he directed a comedic short film titled Trash Day (1984). His third short film, Ice Cream, won the grand prize at the Aspen Shortsfest in 1993. In the same year, he began writing for Late Night with Conan O'Brien before leaving the next year. His next writing job was on Late Show with David Letterman in 1995, and directed a series of shorts for Howie Mandel's Sunny Skies on television, followed by acting as head writer for The Dana Carvey Show (1997) and a writer on The Chris Rock Show (1997–1999). He voiced a fictional version of himself on four episodes of Dr. Katz, Professional Therapist from 1996 to 2002. He directed his first feature, Tomorrow Night, in 1998, which failed to attract any distributors and was later re-released by C.K. on his website in 2014.

In the early 2000s, he continued to collaborate with actor-comedian Chris Rock. They co-wrote Down to Earth in 2001 and C.K. wrote and directed Pootie Tang (which C.K. was fired from during editing) later that year – both featured Rock in acting roles. In 2002, he voiced Brendon Small's estranged father, Andrew Small, in Home Movies. His first leading role was the one-season HBO sitcom Lucky Louie, which he also wrote, in 2006. He worked again with Rock as a writer again with the comedy I Think I Love My Wife (2007). After performing stand-up on several television shows from the late 1980s, he released his first stand-up special, Shameless, in 2007. In 2008, he wrote, performed in, directed, executive produced, and edited Chewed Up, and acted in Diminished Capacity, Welcome Home Roscoe Jenkins, and Role Models (all 2008). His next film role was in The Invention of Lying (2009).

Since 2010, C.K. has starred in, written, directed, edited, and produced the comedy-drama series Louie on FX. He stars as a fictionalized version of himself, a divorced father and comedian. The series has garnered critical acclaim and has won numerous awards. In 2010, his stand-up film Hilarious premiered at the Sundance Film Festival. His next special was Live at the Beacon Theater (2011). He first hosted Saturday Night Live in November 2012, and subsequently hosted it on three more occasions in 2014, 2015, and 2017. He played a love interest in Woody Allen's Blue Jasmine and an FBI agent's boss in David O. Russell's American Hustle (2013). C.K.'s next specials were Oh My God (2013) and Live at the Comedy Store (2015). He co-created, co-writes and executive produces FX's Baskets and wrote, directed, produced, and co-starred in the comedy-drama series Horace and Pete, which was released unexpectedly to his website in 2016. He played the lead voice role in The Secret Life of Pets in the same year.

In 2017 Ck directed, produced, edited, and starred in the unreleased seriocomic film I Love You, Daddy.

For his work performing stand-up, writing, acting, directing, producing and editing, C.K. has received several awards and nominations. Among them are 39 Emmy Award nominations, with six wins.

Key
†	Denotes works that have not yet been released

== Film ==
Year	Title	Director	Writer	Producer	Editor	Actor	Role	Notes	Ref(s)
1984	Trash Day	Yes	Yes	No	No	No	—N/a	Short film	
1990	Caesar's Salad	Yes	Yes	Yes	No	No	—N/a	Short film	
1993	Ice Cream	Yes	Yes	Yes	Yes	Yes	Flower Vendor	Short film	
1995	The Legend of Willie Brown	Yes	Yes	Yes	No	No	—N/a	Short film	
1995	The Letter V	Yes	Yes	Yes	No	No	—N/a	Short film	
1995	Highjacker	Yes	Yes	Yes	No	No	—N/a	Short film	
1995	Hello There	Yes	Yes	Yes	No	Yes	Man on Street / Voice on Tape	Short film	
1995	Brunch	Yes	Yes	Yes	No	No	—N/a	Short film	
1995	Guess Which Person is Crazy	Yes	Yes	Yes	No	No	—N/a	Short film	
1996	Searching for Nixon	Yes	Yes	No	Yes	Yes	Man in Richard Nixon Mask	Short film	
1998	Tomorrow Night	Yes	Yes	Yes	No	Yes	Man squirting people with hose		
1999	Persona Ne'll Aqua	Yes	Yes	No	No	No	—N/a	Short film	
2000	Ugly Revenge	Yes	Yes	No	No	Yes	Narrator	Short film	
2000	Tuna	No	No	No	No	Yes	Clint		
2001	Short Films by Louis C.K.	Yes	Yes	Yes	Yes	Yes	Various	Short film DVD collection	
2001	Down to Earth	No	Yes	No	No	No	—N/a	Co-wrote with Chris Rock, Lance Crouther, and Ali LeRoi	
2001	Pootie Tang	Yes	Yes	No	No	No	—N/a		
2005	London	No	No	No	No	Yes	Therapist		
2007	I Think I Love My Wife	No	Yes	No	No	No	—N/a	Co-wrote with Chris Rock	
2008	Diminished Capacity	No	No	No	No	Yes	Stan		
2008	Welcome Home Roscoe Jenkins	No	No	No	No	Yes	Marty		
2008	Role Models	No	No	No	No	Yes	Security Guard		
2009	The Invention of Lying	No	No	No	No	Yes	Greg Kleinschmidt		
2010	Hilarious	Yes	Yes	Executive	Yes	Yes	Himself	Stand-up special; limited theatrical release	
2013	Blue Jasmine	No	No	No	No	Yes	Al Munsinger		
2013	American Hustle	No	No	No	No	Yes	Stoddard Thorsen		
2014	The Angriest Man in Brooklyn	No	No	No	No	Yes	Dr. Fielding		
2015	Trumbo	No	No	No	No	Yes	Arlen Hird		
2016	The Secret Life of Pets	No	No	No	No	Yes	Max (voice)		
2017 (Note: Premiered at the 2017 Toronto International Film Festival, but has not received a commercial release.)	I Love You, Daddy	Yes	Yes	Yes	Yes	Yes	Glen Topher	Co-wrote the film's story with Vernon Chatman	
2022	Fourth of July	Yes	Yes	Executive	Yes	Yes	Therapist	Co-wrote with Joe List	

== Television ==
Year	Title	Creator	Director	Writer	Producer	Editor	Actor	Role	Notes	Ref(s)
1993–94	Late Night with Conan O'Brien	No	No	Yes	No	No	Yes	Various	291 episodes	
1995	Late Show with David Letterman	No	No	Yes	No	No	No	—N/a	11 episodes	
1995	Saturday Night Live	No	No	No	No	No	Yes	Escaped Prisoner	Episode: "Season 21 Episode 02"	
1995	Howie Mandel's Sunny Skies	No	Yes	Yes	No	No	Yes	Various characters		
1996	The Dana Carvey Show	No	No	Yes	Yes	No	Yes	Various characters	8 episodes	
1996	HBO Comedy Half-Hour	No	No	Yes	No	No	Yes	Himself	Stand-up special	
1996–2002	Dr. Katz, Professional Therapist	No	No	Yes	No	No	Yes	Louis	Voice; 4 episodes	
1997	Oddville, MTV	No	No	No	No	No	Yes	David Cross	1 episode	
1997–99	The Chris Rock Show	No	No	Yes	Yes	No	Yes	Various characters	28 episodes	
1997–2007	Saturday Night Live	No	Yes	No	No	No	No	—N/a	"Saturday TV Funhouse" segments	
1999	Louis C.K.'s Filthy Stupid Talent Show	Yes	No	Yes	Yes	No	Yes	Himself	Television special	
2000	ShortCuts	No	No	No	No	No	Yes	Host	10 episodes	
2001	Comedy Central Presents	No	No	Yes	No	No	Yes	Himself	Stand-up special	
2002	Home Movies	No	No	No	No	No	Yes	Andrew Small	Voice; 5 episodes	
2002–03	Cedric the Entertainer Presents	No	No	Yes	Yes	No	No	—N/a	16 episodes	
2005	One Night Stand	No	No	Yes	No	No	Yes	Himself	Stand-up special	
2006	Lucky Louie	Yes	No	Yes	Executive	No	Yes	Louie	13 episodes	
2007	Shameless	No	No	Yes	Executive	No	Yes	Himself	Stand-up special	
2008	Chewed Up	No	Yes	Yes	Executive	Yes	Yes	Himself	Stand-up special	
2009–12	Parks and Recreation	No	No	No	No	No	Yes	Dave Sanderson	6 episodes	
2010–15	Louie	Yes	Yes	Yes	Executive	Yes	Yes	Louie C.K.	61 episodes	
2011	Talking Funny	No	No	No	No	No	Yes	Himself	Television special, HBO	
2012–17	Saturday Night Live	No	No	No	No	No	Yes	Host	4 episodes	
2013	Oh My God	No	Yes	Yes	Executive	Yes	Yes	Himself	Stand-up special	
2014	Comedians in Cars Getting Coffee	No	No	No	No	No	Yes	Himself	Episode: Comedy, Sex, and the Blue Numbers	
2015	Saturday Night Live 40th Anniversary Special	No	No	No	No	No	Yes	Himself	TV special	
2015–16	Gravity Falls	No	No	No	No	No	Yes	The Horrifying Sweaty One-Armed Monstrosity	Voice; 2 episodes (Note: Because of his sexual misconduct admission in 2017, C.K. has since been redubbed by the series creator Alex Hirsch.)	
2015–17	One Mississippi	No	No	No	Executive	No	No	—N/a		
2016	Portlandia	No	No	No	No	No	Yes	Himself	Episode: "Family Emergency"	
2016–17	Baskets	Yes	No	Yes	Executive	No	No			
2016–22	Better Things	Yes	Yes	Yes	Executive	Yes	No	—N/a		
2017	Family Guy	No	No	No	No	No	Yes	Himself (voice)	Episode: "Emmy-Winning Episode"	
2017	Louis C.K.: 2017	No	Yes	Yes	Executive	No	Yes	Himself	Stand-up special	
2020	The Comedy Store	No	No	No	No	No	Yes	Himself		

== Standup specials ==
Year	Title	Notes
1996	HBO Comedy Half-Hour	HBO
2001	Comedy Central Presents	Comedy Central
2001	Live in Houston	louisck.com
2003	Just for Laughs	JFL
2005	One Night Stand	HBO
2007	Shameless	HBO/louisck.com
2008	Chewed Up	Showtime/Image Entertainment/louisck.com
2010	Hilarious	Epix/Comedy Central/louisck.com
2011	Live at the Beacon Theater	louisck.com/FX
2012	Word: Live at Carnegie Hall	louisck.com
2013	Just for Laughs	JFL
2013	Oh My God	HBO/louisck.com
2015	Live at the Comedy Store	louisck.com/FX
2015	Live at Madison Square Garden	louisck.com
2017	2017	Netflix/louisck.com
2020	Sincerely Louis CK	louisck.com
2021	Sorry	louisck.com
2023	Back to the Garden	louisck.com
2023	Louis C.K. at The Dolby	louisck.com
2026	Ridiculous	Netflix

== Web releases ==
Year	Title	Director	Writer	Producer	Editor	Actor	Role	Notes	Ref.
2006	Jimmy Carter builds a house	Yes	Yes	No	No	Yes	Jimmy Carter	Video short	
2007	Louis C.K. learns about the Catholic Church (Note: Filmed as part of an abandoned HBO sketch pilot created by C.K.)	Yes	Yes	No	Yes	Yes	Himself	Video short	
2007	Louis C.K. and a child	Yes	Yes	No	No	Yes	Himself	Video short	
2007	Louis C.K. animation short	Yes	Yes	No	No	Yes	Himself (voice)	Video short	
2007	Louis C.K. airline safety video	Yes	Yes	No	No	No	—N/a	Video short	
2008	I Say the Darndest Things to Kids	Yes	Yes	No	No	Yes	Himself	Video short	
2009	Louis C.K.’s Last Chance	Yes	Yes	No	No	Yes	Himself	Video short	
2011	Live at the Beacon Theater	Yes	Yes	Executive	Yes	Yes	Himself	Stand-up special	
2012	Word: Live at Carnegie Hall	Yes	Yes	Executive	No	Yes	Himself	Stand-up album	
2014	Comedians in Cars Getting Coffee	No	No	No	No	Yes	Himself (guest)	Web series	
2014	Todd Barry: The Crowd Work Tour	No	No	Executive	No	No	—N/a	Stand-up special	
2015	Live at the Comedy Store	Yes	Yes	Executive	Yes	Yes	Himself	Stand-up special	
2015	Live at Madison Square Garden	Yes	Yes	Executive	No	Yes	Himself	Stand-up album	
2016	Horace and Pete	Yes	Yes	Executive	No	Yes	Horace Wittel VIII	Web series	
2016	Barry Crimmins: Whatever Threatens You	Yes	No	Executive	No	Yes	Himself, introduction	Stand-up special	
2020	Sincerely Louis CK	Yes	Yes	Executive	Yes	Yes	Himself	Stand-up special	
2020	Long-Distance Relationship	Yes	Yes	Yes	Yes	Yes	Himself	Podcast series with Blanche Gardin	
2021	Sorry	Yes	Yes	Yes	No	Yes	Himself	Stand-up special	
2023	Robert Kelly Kill Box	Yes	No	Executive	No	No	—N/a	Stand-up special	
2023	Louis C.K.: Back at the Garden	Yes	Yes	Yes	No	Yes	Himself	Online stand-up live special	
2023	Louis C.K. at The Dolby	Yes	Yes	Executive	No	Yes	Himself	Stand-up special	

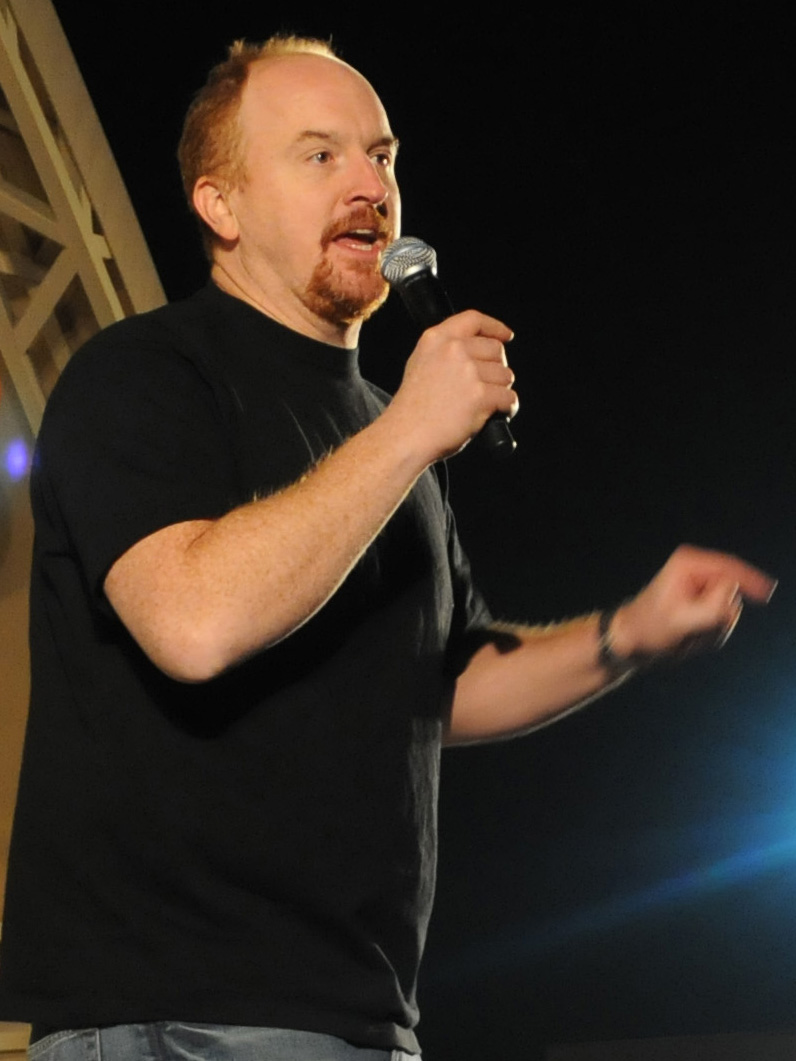
Louis C.K. performing in Kuwait, December 2008.

== Documentary appearances ==
Year	Title	Role	Notes	Ref.
2006	Maxed Out	Himself	Documentary film	
2007	Assume the Position 201 with Mr. Wuhl	Himself	Documentary, HBO	
2010	I Am Comic	Himself	Documentary	
2011	Talking Funny	Himself	Television special, HBO	
2016	Thank You, Del: The Story of the Del Close Marathon	Himself		
2017	Too Funny to Fail	Himself (archived footage)	Documentary film, Hulu	
2017	The History of Comedy	Himself	Documentary series, CNN	
2017	Oh, Rick!	Himself	Documentary film	
2020	Live at the Comedy Store	Himself	Documentary series, Showtime	
2023	Sorry/Not Sorry	Himself (archived footage)	Documentary film	
