= List of awards and nominations received by Louis C.K. =

Louis C.K. awards and nominations
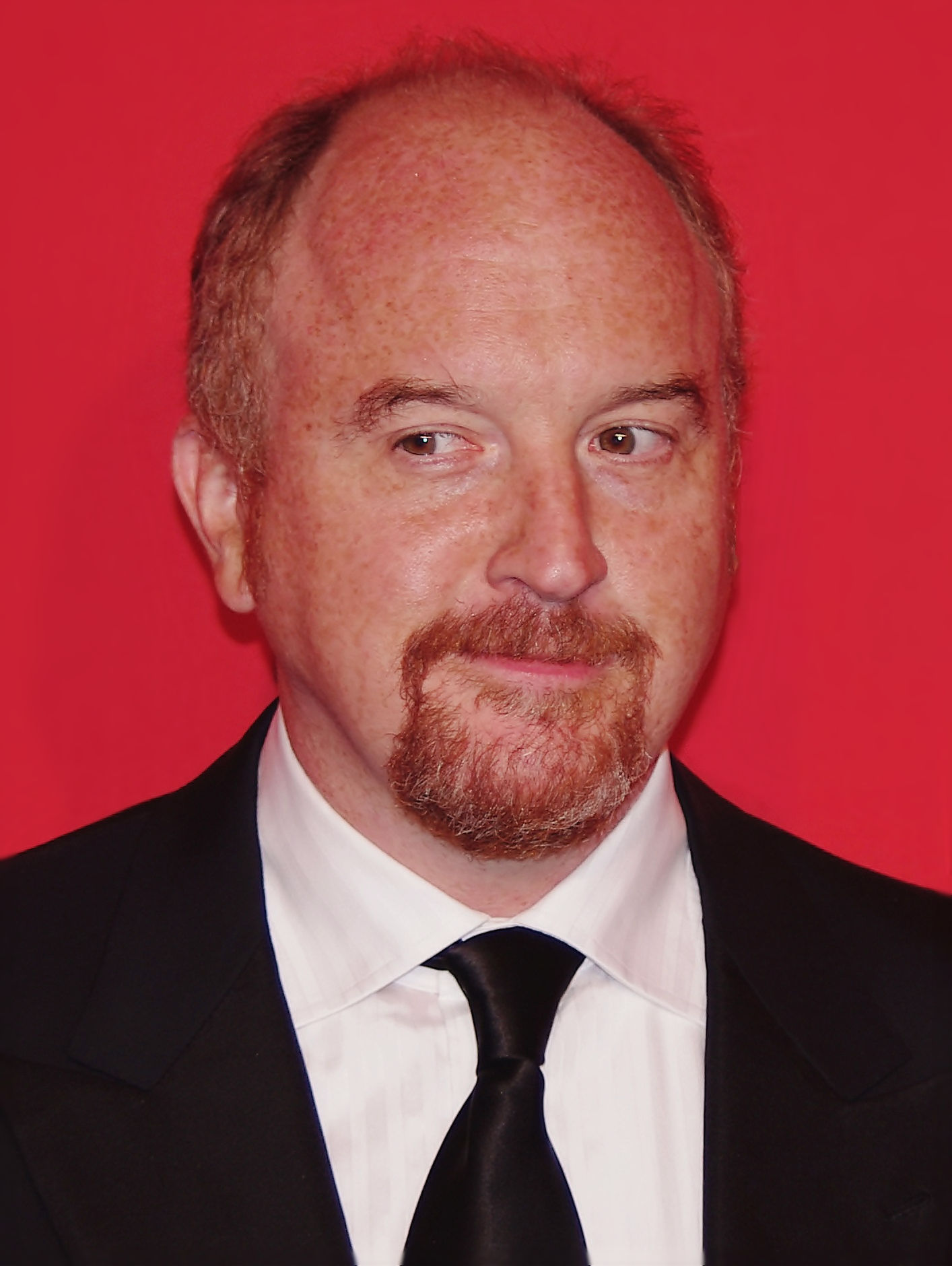
- C.K. at the 2012 Time 100 gala
Awards and nominations
Award	Wins	Nominations
Emmy Awards	6	39
Grammy Awards	3	5
Golden Globe Awards	0	2
Screen Actors Guild Awards	0	1
Peabody Awards	3	3

Totals (Note: Certain award groups do not simply award one winner. They acknowledge several different recipients, have runners-up, and have third place. Since this is a specific recognition and is different from losing an award, runner-up mentions are considered wins in this award tally. For simplification and to avoid errors, each award in this list has been presumed to have had a prior nomination.)
- Wins: 13
- Nominations: 54

This article is a list of awards and nominations received by Louis C.K.

Louis C.K. is an American stand-up comedian. For his work performing stand-up, writing, acting, directing, producing and editing, C.K. has received several awards and nominations winning six Primetime Emmy Awards as well as three Grammy Awards, three Peabody Awards, three Critics' Choice Awards and a Screen Actors Guild Award with nominations for two Golden Globe Awards. He was included as one of the Time Magazine's 100 Most Influential People in 2012, and Rolling Stone ranked him on their list of the 50 best stand-up comics of all time in 2017.

C.K. started his career as a stand-up comedian in the late 1980s in Boston. He worked as a comedy writer for Late Night with Conan O'Brien from 1993 to 1994, the Late Show with David Letterman in 1995, and The Dana Carvey Show in 1996. He won the Primetime Emmy Award for Outstanding Writing for a Variety Series as a writer on the HBO late-night talk show The Chris Rock Show in 1999. He has released several comedy specials and won three Primetime Emmy Awards for Outstanding Writing for a Variety Special for Live at the Beacon Theater (2011), Oh My God (2013), and Live at the Comedy Store (2015). He was Emmy-nominated for Chewed Up (2008), Hilarious (2010), and Louis C.K. 2017 (2017).

C.K. established himself as a showrunner in television with the FX dramedy series Louie (2010–2015), where he also served as the creator, actor, director, editor and producer. He won the Primetime Emmy Award for Outstanding Writing for a Comedy Series for the episodes "Pregnant" (2011) and "So Did the Fat Lady" (2014). As an actor, he won two Critics' Choice Television Awards for Best Actor in a Comedy Series with nominations for five Primetime Emmy Awards for Outstanding Lead Actor in a Comedy Series, two Golden Globe Awards for Best Actor – Television Series Musical or Comedy, and three Screen Actors Guild Awards for Outstanding Actor in a Comedy Series. He also co-created and executive produced Baskets (2016–2019), Better Things (2016–2019), and Horace and Pete (2016), winning two Peabody Awards for the later two shows.

As an actor, he was nominated twice for the Screen Actors Guild Award for Outstanding Performance by a Cast in a Motion Picture for the David O. Russell crime film American Hustle (2013), and Jay Roach's Hollywood blacklist drama Trumbo (2015), winning for the former. He hosted the NBC sketch comedy series Saturday Night Live four times from 2012 to 2017, and was nominated for three Primetime Emmy Awards for Outstanding Guest Actor in a Comedy Series. As a standup, he won three Grammy Awards for Best Comedy Album for Hilarious in 2012, Oh My God in 2015, and Sincerely Louis CK in 2022. He was Grammy-nominated for Live at Madison Square Garden in 2016 and Sorry in 2022.

== Major awards ==
=== Critics' Choice Awards ===
Year	Category	Nominated work	Result	Ref.
Critics' Choice Movie Awards
2014	Best Acting Ensemble	American Hustle	Won	
Critics Choice Television Awards
2011	Best Comedy Series	Louie (season one)	Nominated	
2011	Best Actor in a Comedy Series	Louie (season one)	Nominated	
2012	Best Comedy Series	Louie (season two)	Nominated	
2012	Best Actor in a Comedy Series	Louie (season two)	Won	
2013	Best Comedy Series	Louie (season three)	Nominated	
2013	Best Actor in a Comedy Series	Louie (season three)	Won	
2014	Best Comedy Series	Louie (season four)	Nominated	
2014	Best Actor in a Comedy Series	Louie (season four)	Nominated	

=== Emmy Awards ===
Primetime Emmy Awards
Year	Category	Nominated work	Result	Ref.
1998	Outstanding Writing for a Variety or Music Program	The Chris Rock Show	Nominated	
1999	Outstanding Writing for a Variety or Music Program	The Chris Rock Show	Won	
2000	Outstanding Writing for a Variety or Music Program	The Chris Rock Show	Nominated	
2000	Outstanding Writing for a Variety or Music Program	Late Night with Conan O'Brien	Nominated	
2009	Outstanding Writing for a Variety or Music Program	Chewed Up	Nominated	
2011	Outstanding Lead Actor in a Comedy Series	Louie (episode: "Bully")	Nominated	
2011	Outstanding Writing for a Comedy Series	Louie (episode: "Poker/Divorce")	Nominated	
2011	Outstanding Picture Editing for a Variety Program	Hilarious	Nominated	
2011	Outstanding Writing for a Variety Special	Hilarious	Nominated	
2012	Outstanding Lead Actor in a Comedy Series	Louie (episode: "Duckling")	Nominated	
2012	Outstanding Writing for a Comedy Series	Louie (episode: "Pregnant")	Won	
2012	Outstanding Directing for a Comedy Series	Louie (episode: "Duckling")	Nominated	
2012	Outstanding Special Class Program	Live at the Beacon Theater	Nominated	
2012	Outstanding Writing for a Variety Special	Live at the Beacon Theater	Won	
2012	Outstanding Directing for a Variety Special	Live at the Beacon Theater	Nominated	
2012	Outstanding Picture Editing for a Variety Program	Live at the Beacon Theater	Nominated	
2013	Outstanding Comedy Series	Louie (season 3)	Nominated	
2013	Outstanding Lead Actor in a Comedy Series	Louie (episode: "Daddy's Girlfriend, Part 1")	Nominated	
2013	Outstanding Writing for a Comedy Series (w/ Pamela Adlon)	Louie (episode: "Daddy's Girlfriend, Part 1")	Nominated	
2013	Outstanding Directing for a Comedy Series	Louie (episode: "New Year's Eve")	Nominated	
2013	Outstanding Guest Actor in a Comedy Series	Saturday Night Live (episode: "Louis C.K. / fun.")	Nominated	
2013	Outstanding Variety Special	Oh My God	Nominated	
2013	Outstanding Writing for a Variety Special	Oh My God	Won	
2013	Outstanding Directing for a Variety Special	Oh My God	Nominated	
2013	Outstanding Picture Editing for a Variety Program	Oh My God	Nominated	
2014	Outstanding Comedy Series	Louie (season 4)	Nominated	
2014	Outstanding Lead Actor in a Comedy Series	Louie (episode: "Model")	Nominated	
2014	Outstanding Writing for a Comedy Series	Louie (episode: "So Did the Fat Lady")	Won	
2014	Outstanding Directing for a Comedy Series	Louie (episode: "Elevator Part 6")	Nominated	
2014	Outstanding Guest Actor in a Comedy Series	Saturday Night Live (episode: "Louis C.K. / Sam Smith")	Nominated	
2015	Outstanding Comedy Series	Louie (season 5)	Nominated	
2015	Outstanding Lead Actor in a Comedy Series	Louie (episode: "Bobby's House")	Nominated	
2015	Outstanding Writing for a Comedy Series	Louie (episode: "Bobby's House")	Nominated	
2015	Outstanding Directing for a Comedy Series	Louie (episode: "Sleepover")	Nominated	
2015	Outstanding Guest Actor in a Comedy Series	Saturday Night Live (episode: "Louis C.K. / Rihanna")	Nominated	
2015	Outstanding Variety Special	Louis C.K.: Live at the Comedy Store	Nominated	
2015	Outstanding Writing for a Variety Special	Louis C.K.: Live at the Comedy Store	Won	
2017	Outstanding Variety Special	Louis C.K.: 2017	Nominated	
2017	Outstanding Writing for a Variety Special	Louis C.K.: 2017	Nominated	

=== Grammy Awards ===
Year	Category	Nominated work	Result	Ref.
2012	Best Comedy Album	Hilarious	Won	
2015	Best Comedy Album	Oh My God	Nominated	
2016	Best Comedy Album	Live at Madison Square Garden	Won	
2022	Best Comedy Album	Sincerely Louis C.K.	Won	
2023	Best Comedy Album	Sorry	Nominated	

=== Golden Globe Awards ===
Year	Category	Nominated work	Result	Ref.
2012	Best Actor in a Television Series Musical or Comedy	Louie	Nominated	
2014	Best Actor in a Television Series Musical or Comedy	Louie	Nominated	

=== Peabody Award ===
Year	Category	Nominated work	Result	Ref.
2012	Area of Excellence in Entertainment	Louie	Won	
2016	Area of Excellence in Entertainment	Better Things	Won	
2016	Area of Excellence in Entertainment	Horace and Pete	Won	

== Critics awards ==
Year	Award	Category	Nominated work	Result	Ref.
2013	Alliance of Women Film Journalists	Best Ensemble Cast	American Hustle	Won	
2013	Detroit Film Critics Society	Best Ensemble	American Hustle	Won	
2013	Detroit Film Critics Society	Best Ensemble	Blue Jasmine	Nominated	
2013	New York Film Critics Online Awards	Best Cast	American Hustle	Won	
2013	Phoenix Film Critics Society Award	Best Cast	American Hustle	Won	
2013	San Diego Film Critics Society Awards	Best Performance by an Ensemble	American Hustle	Won	
2013	Washington D.C. Area Film Critics Association	Best Ensemble	American Hustle	Nominated	
2014	Online Film & Television Association	Best Host or Panelist in a Non-Fiction Program	Oh My God	Nominated	
2015	Online Film & Television Association	Best Male Performance in a Fiction Program	Saturday Night Live	Nominated	

== Miscellaneous awards ==
Organizations	Year	Category	Work	Result	Ref.
American Comedy Awards	2011	Stand-up Special	Hilarious	Won	
American Comedy Awards	2012	Stand-up Special	Live at the Beacon Theater	Won	
American Comedy Awards	2014	Comedy Special of the Year	Oh My God	Won	
American Comedy Awards	2014	Comedy Supporting Actor – Film	American Hustle	Won	
American Film Institute	2011	AFI TV Program of the Year	Louie	Won	
American Film Institute	2012	AFI TV Program of the Year	Louie	Won	
Directors Guild of America	2013	Outstanding Directing – Comedy Series	Louie, "New Year's Eve"	Nominated	
Directors Guild of America	2014	Outstanding Directing – Variety Special	Oh My God	Nominated	
Directors Guild of America	2015	Outstanding Directing – Comedy Series	Louie, "Elevator Part 6"	Nominated	
Directors Guild of America	2016	Outstanding Directing – Comedy Series	Louie, "Sleepover"	Nominated	
Florida Film Festival	1998	Best Narrative	Tomorrow Night	Won	
Hamptons International Film Festival	1998	Best American Independent Film	Tomorrow Night	Won	
Gotham Awards	2016	Breakthrough Series - Long Form	Horace and Pete	Nominated	
Gotham Awards	2017	Breakthrough Series - Long Form	Better Things	Nominated	
Producers Guild of America	2012	Episodic Television Series – Comedy	Louie	Nominated	
Producers Guild of America	2014	Episodic Television Series – Comedy	Louie	Nominated	
Television Critics Association	2011	Individual Achievement in Comedy	Louie	Nominated	
Television Critics Association	2011	Outstanding Achievement in Comedy	Louie	Nominated	
Television Critics Association	2012	Individual Achievement in Comedy	Louie	Won	
Television Critics Association	2012	Outstanding Achievement in Comedy	Louie	Won	
Television Critics Association	2013	Individual Achievement in Comedy	Louie	Won	
Television Critics Association	2013	Outstanding Achievement in Comedy	Louie	Nominated	
Television Critics Association	2014	Individual Achievement in Comedy	Louie	Nominated	
Television Critics Association	2014	Outstanding Achievement in Comedy	Louie	Won	
Television Critics Association	2015	Outstanding Achievement in Comedy	Louie	Won	
Satellite Awards	2011	Best Actor – Television Series Musical or Comedy	Louie	Won	
Satellite Awards	2012	Best Actor – Television Series Musical or Comedy	Louie	Nominated	
Satellite Awards	2015	Best Actor – Television Series Musical or Comedy	Louie	Nominated	
Screen Actors Guild Awards	2012	Outstanding Actor in a Comedy Series	Louie	Nominated	
Screen Actors Guild Awards	2013	Outstanding Ensemble Cast in a Motion Picture	American Hustle	Won	
Screen Actors Guild Awards	2014	Outstanding Actor in a Comedy Series	Louie	Nominated	
Screen Actors Guild Awards	2015	Outstanding Actor in a Comedy Series	Louie	Nominated	
Screen Actors Guild Awards	2015	Outstanding Ensemble Cast in a Motion Picture	Trumbo	Nominated	
Writers Guild of America	2011	Best Comedy Series (With Pamela Adlon)	Louie	Nominated	
Writers Guild of America	2012	Best Comedy Series (With Pamela Adlon & Vernon Chatman)	Louie	Won	
Writers Guild of America	2014	Best Comedy Series (With Pamela Adlon)	Louie	Won	
Writers Guild of America	2014	Best Episodic Comedy	Louie, "So Did the Fat Lady"	Won	
Writers Guild of America	2016	Best Comedy Series	Better Things	Nominated	

== Honorary awards ==
Organizations	Year	Award	Result	Ref.
Just for Laughs Comedy Festival	2011	Comedy Person of the Year	Honored	
The Webby Awards	2012	Person of the Year	Honored	
Time Magazine	2012	Time 100 Most Influential People	Honored	
Made in NY Awards	2014	Key Cultural Figure in New York	Honored	
Rolling Stone	2015	Ranked #3 on their "25 Best Stand-Up Specials of All Time" (Note: C.K.'s special Shameless)	Honored	
Rolling Stone	2017	Ranked #4 on its list of the 50 best stand-up comics of all time	Honored	
