= Word: Live at Carnegie Hall =

Live album by Louis C.K.
- Released: May 12, 2012
- Recorded: November 4, 2010, New York City
- Venue: Carnegie Hall
- Studio: LouisCK.com
- Genre: Comedy
- Length: 63 minutes
- Label: Pig Newton
- Producer: Louis C.K.

Louis C.K. chronology
Live at the Beacon Theater (2011)	Word: Live at Carnegie Hall (2012)	Live at the Comedy Store (2015)

Word: Live at Carnegie Hall is a live album by comedian Louis C.K. It was produced independently and sold directly through the comedian's website for the cost of US$5.00. Much of the material appeared on the second season of Louie, as well as his appearances on Conan and The Tonight Show. Because he planned to use it in the show, he opted not to release the standup album until after the season was complete, meaning it was released after Live at the Beacon Theater although Word was recorded earlier.

C.K. re-released the audio-only album for download on his website in April 2020.

== Track listing ==
No.	Title	Length
1.	"Intro"	0:49
2.	"Let's Talk Some Shit"	1:22
3.	"I Could Ruin Your Night"	1:16
4.	"Money"	1:00
5.	"Darlene and Joey"	4:17
6.	"Civic Pride and Civic Rivalry"	2:21
7.	"20 Year Olds"	4:58
8.	"The Right To Complain"	2:45
9.	"Unhealthy Father"	7:50
10.	"When I Was A Kid"	2:15
11.	"Three 5 Year Olds"	4:24
12.	"Staying Married For The Kids"	4:21
13.	"Sleep"	5:10
14.	"Sex"	6:27
15.	"Encore"	2:14
16.	"When I Thought I Was Going To Die"	7:22
17.	"Schindler's List"	3:30
18.	"Outro"	0:45
