= Rick Shapiro =

American comedian and actor (born 1959)

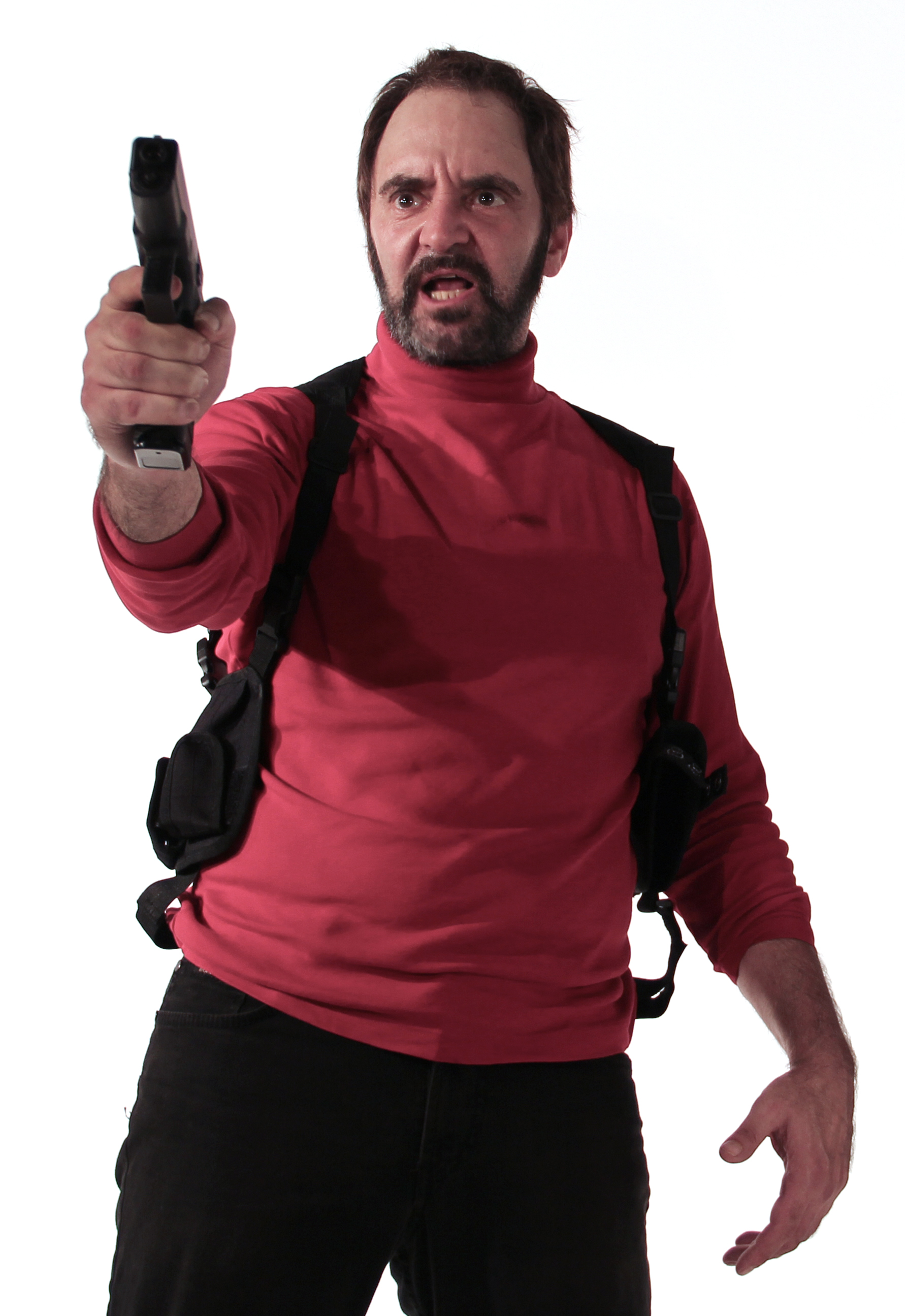
- Rick Shapiro in the film Timeless
- Born: April 13, 1959 (age 67); New Jersey, United States

Comedy career
- Years active: early 1980s–present
- Medium: Stand-Up; Television; Film; Writer
- Genres: Improvisational comedy Observational comedy Black comedy Blue comedy
- Website: RickShapiro.tv

Rick Shapiro (born April 13, 1959) is a Los Angeles–based comedian and actor.

== Life and career ==
Shapiro was born in New Jersey. Spending his early years in New York City and New Jersey, Shapiro started his career in the early 1980s as a comedian at Catch A Rising Star on Broadway. Besides performing regularly on stage, throughout the 1990s he acted and starred in multiple films by Louis CK, including Ice Cream (1993) and Tomorrow Night (1998). Additionally, he portrayed the re-occurring character "Angry Poet" in Late Night with Conan O'Brien. In 1998, Shapiro released his first comedy CD called Unconditional Love, which Billboard called "hard-edged and uncompromising".

In the 2000s, Shapiro's career continues in multiple fields. He is performing stand-up comedy nationally and internationally, debuting a one-man show in 2007 in the Edinburgh Festival, and touring Australia in 2009. He had his first video game appearance in 2008, portraying the character Mason Waylon on the radio station PLR in Grand Theft Auto IV, a guest on a talk show who eventually drills holes in the heads of the two other guests.

Shapiro has an active acting career, appearing in numerous film and television productions. In film, his most recent roles are in Top Five by Chris Rock, portraying T-Rick in the movie Project X, and acting in the German comedy Timeless. His television credits include Jerry in Lucky Louie by Louis C.K. on HBO. Additionally, he appears in a scene originally filmed for the pilot of Louie.

Shapiro's first book Unfiltered, containing over 200 previously unreleased writings, was released in 2012 along with his second CD, Catalyst for Change.

In 2013, Rick Shapiro was diagnosed with Parkinson's disease. As of August 2014, he is practically symptom-free and is productive, and in 2014–15, Shapiro appeared in the role of Marc Maron's eccentric neighbor, Bernie, in the IFC comedy series Maron.

== Style ==
Shapiro is mainly known for his stream-of-consciousness monologues on stage that can run for more than an hour, in which he addresses many topics that are controversial or considered taboo by most comedians. His comedic style has been described as "explosive".

== Filmography (excerpt) ==
- Joey (1986) as Larry
- True Love as Kevin
- Caesar's Salad (1990) (short film)
- Ice Cream (1993) as Man's Brother (short film)
- Brunch (1995) as Old Woman (short film)
- Highjacker (1998) as Highjacker (short film)
- Tomorrow Night (1998) as Tina
- Pootie Tang (2001) as Shakey
- Lucky Louie (2006–2007) as Jerry
- Grand Theft Auto IV (2008) as Waylon Mason
- Louie (2010) uncredited
- The League (2011) as Bum
- Project X (2012) as T-Rick
- Top Five (2014) as Biker AA Guy; Uncredited
- Maron (2014–2016) as Bernie
- Timeless (2016) as State's Attorney / Special Agent / Paratrooper / Repairman
- Heart, Baby (2017) as Shaky J
