= Live in Houston =

Live in Houston may refer to:

- Live in Houston 1981: The Escape Tour DVD/CD by Journey 2005
- Live in Houston (Louis C.K. album)
- Live In Houston, album by Johnny Winter
- Live In Houston, album by Velvet Revolver
