= Chewed Up =

Live album by Louis C.K.
- Released: December 16, 2008
- Recorded: March 1, 2008
- Venues: Berklee Performance Center (Boston, MA)
- Studio: Showtime
- Genres: Comedy; spoken word
- Length: 1:06:54
- Label: Image Entertainment
- Producer: Michelle Caputo

Louis C.K. chronology
Shameless (2007)	Chewed Up (2008)	Hilarious (2010)

Professional ratings
Review scores
Source	Rating
AllMusic	3.5/5 stars

Chewed Up is the third concert film and stand-up comedy album by American comedian and director Louis C.K. It was filmed and recorded on March 1, 2008, at Berklee Performance Center in Boston. Released on CD and DVD by Image Entertainment on December 16, 2008, the special is dedicated to George Carlin, who, coincidentally, had filmed his final one-hour special on the same night, and soon died of heart failure on June 22, 2008. C.K. re-released the video and audio album for download and streaming on his website in April 2020.

== Track listing ==
All tracks are written by Louis Székely.

No.	Title	Length
1.	"Offensive Words"	8:48
2.	"Processing Shame"	3:27
3.	"My Horrible Body"	2:49
4.	"Cinnabon"	3:52
5.	"Half Dead"	4:37
6.	"Milk & Pets"	3:13
7.	"I Enjoy Being White"	2:43
8.	"I Hate Deer"	3:50
9.	"A Three Year Old's Secret"	4:19
10.	"Daddy I Don't Like Chicken"	4:01
11.	"The Diaper"	2:42
12.	"Boys vs. Girls"	3:54
13.	"Jizz On Demand"	2:41
14.	"9/11"	5:03
15.	"Girls & Women"	4:36

Bonus tracks
No.	Title	Length
16.	"4AM"	2:59
17.	"Sweatpants & Vodka"	3:57
18.	"I Like Opium"	3:26
Total length:		1:06:54

== Charts ==
Chart (2009)	Peak position
US Top Comedy Albums (Billboard)	5
US Heatseekers Albums (Billboard)	42
