= Ice Cream (1993 film) =

1993 film by Louis C.K.

- Directed by: Louis C.K.
- Written by: Louis C.K.
- Produced by: Louis C.K.
- Starring: Laura Kightlinger; Craig Anton; Rick Shapiro; Sheldon Wicowitz; Jim Labrioza; Mike Ivy
- Cinematography: Paul Koestner
- Edited by: Louis C.K.
- Release date: 1993
- Running time: 13:09
- Country: United States
- Language: English

Ice Cream is a 1993 American surrealist comedy short film written, directed, produced, and edited by Louis C.K. The film stars Laura Kightlinger, Craig Anton, Rick Shapiro, Sheldon Wicowitz, Jim Labrioza, and Mike Ivy. Paul Koestner, who would later work as director of photography on Louie, provided cinematography.

C.K.'s second film released to the public, it won the grand prize at the Aspen Shortsfest in 1994. The film was later released as part of The Short Films of Louis C.K. and on C.K.'s personal YouTube channel.

== Plot ==
The film begins with "The Boss" by Henry Mancini playing as a thief (Jim Labrioza) steals items in a store; the clerk (Laura Kightlinger) doesn't interfere. A man (Craig Anton) walks into the store and asks her out on a date at a restaurant called Tony's, which she accepts. At the date, he asks whether she has any siblings; she tells him she has a sibling, but doesn't answer his question if he is her elder or younger brother. While on the street, the man buys flowers from a flower vendor (Louis C.K.) and attempts to give them to her, but she awkwardly stares off into the distance.

The two have dinner at the woman's house. Her father furiously asks if the man wants to have sex with his daughter. The man says he does, but her father says he has to "marry her first". They get married and return to their apartment, where they have sex. The two have a child, and the man says they "better not do that anymore". They drop the baby off at a man's house, who finds it and brings it in.

The man's brother (Rick Shapiro) tells a story about finding a dead baby mouse in his nose. The man's wife comes into the room and asks when his brother will be leaving. The man replies by saying "Hey, he's my brother", and the brother smiles at her. At Grand Central Terminal, as the brother is about to depart, the man asks him if he had sex with his wife. He repeatedly shouts "I did!" as he walks away.

Now with another child, the couple take the baby to a magician, who makes it disappear. While in the kitchen, the woman sees a beam of light and the couple are seen with a third baby. In the next scene, the child has grown and the family are walking down a street. The child sees an electric horse and gets on it. The child, eating an ice cream, sits on the electric horse while the sound of a car hitting his parents is heard. The child isn't disconcerted by the noise, and soon after the dead bodies of the couple are shown while a mariachi band plays.

== Cast ==
- Laura Kightlinger as Woman
- Craig Anton as Man
- Rick Shapiro as Man's Brother
- Sheldon Wicowitz as Woman's Father
- Jim Labrioza as Thief
- Mike Ivy as Resident of Townhouse
- Louis C.K. as Flower Vendor
- Neal Brennan as Woman's Brother
- Yvette Edelhart as Woman's Mother
- Coby Schoffman as Babies #1 / 2 / 3
- Chipps Cooney as Magician
- William Milauskas as Grown Kid
- Bustamante-Azteca as Mariachi Band
