= Live in Houston (Louis C.K. album) =

Live album by Louis C.K.
- Released: 2001
- Recorded: 2001, Houston, Texas
- Venue: The Laff Stop
- Studio: Louisck.net
- Genre: Comedy
- Length: 38:24
- Label: Circus King Productions
- Producer: Louis C.K.

Louis C.K. chronology
Live in Houston (2001)	Shameless (2007)

Live in Houston is the first live album released by comedian Louis C.K. In contrast to later releases, it was produced and published independently, and sold primarily at shows and directly through the comedian's website. The album later became the subject of interest when controversy arose surrounding whether similar material on the 2005 Dane Cook album Retaliation was plagiarized from the Louis C.K. material. Much of the material overlaps with C.K.'s Comedy Central Presents special, recorded the same year.

C.K. re-released the audio-only album as a CD, vinyl album, and audio download on his website in April 2020.

== Track listing ==
No.	Title	Length
1.	"Intro"	0:20
2.	"Chinese"	0:18
3.	"Do You Have the Time"	1:09
4.	"French Guy"	0:46
5.	"Peach"	0:48
6.	"Guy on Bike, Guitar, Liar"	1:34
7.	"Shopping With No Money"	1:39
8.	"Wal-Mart"	1:30
9.	"Diet"	2:00
10.	"Christmas Caroling"	0:42
11.	"Arguing"	0:33
12.	"Kid's Names"	1:06
13.	"Shitty Kids"	2:17
14.	"Guy in Traffic"	2:38
15.	"Impressions"	1:11
16.	"Diner Ordering"	0:54
17.	"Cliches, Old Sayings"	1:18
18.	"Happy and in Pain"	0:41
19.	"Urban Myth"	0:33
20.	"Wrong Number/AT&T"	1:30
21.	"The Bank"	2:54
22.	"End of Bank"	0:27
23.	"Bill Gates"	2:46
24.	"Sign, Sign"	1:15
25.	"Racism"	2:12
26.	"Faggy Shirt"	0:30
27.	"Gay People"	1:31
28.	"Gay Dream"	0:55
29.	"Itchy Asshole"	0:44
30.	"Nympho"	1:40
31.	"Goodnight"	0:03
