= Talking Funny (television special) =

US comedy television special

- Genre: television special, comedy discussion
- Directed by: John Moffit
- Starring: Ricky Gervais; Jerry Seinfeld; Chris Rock; Louis C.K.
- Country of origin: United States
- No. of seasons: 1
- No. of episodes: 1

Production
- Executive producer: Ricky Gervais
- Editor: David W. Foster
- Camera setup: Mounted
- Running time: Approx. 60 min

Original release
- Network: HBO
- Release: April 20, 2011

Talking Funny is a one-hour comedy television special featuring four comedians: Louis C.K., Ricky Gervais, Chris Rock, and Jerry Seinfeld. In the informal conversation, which aired in 2011 on HBO, the four comedians discussed subjects like race, crude language, the motivations driving their comedy, their inspirations, and the comedy industry in general.

== Cast ==
- Jerry Seinfeld
- Chris Rock
- Ricky Gervais
- Louis C.K.

== Content ==
Throughout the special the comedians debate various topics such as the merit of "stupid jokes" as well as crude language in their sets. They also compliment each other on specific bits they do. Seinfeld praised C.K.'s describing him as a comedian who "tap danced over six laser beams". C.K. described Seinfeld as a "singular comedian". He also reminisced about when he was a young comic opening for Seinfeld. Chris Rock mentions his heroes as being Prince and Woody Allen for their work ethic as they had new material every year. They also talk about the comedy industry at large, ticketing innovation, and their fears on stage.

== Production ==
In an interview C.K. stated the initial conversation ran over 4 hours before being cut down to an hour long discussion.

According to the BBC the special was organized by Ricky Gervais who serves as an executive producer on the one-off special.

== Reception ==
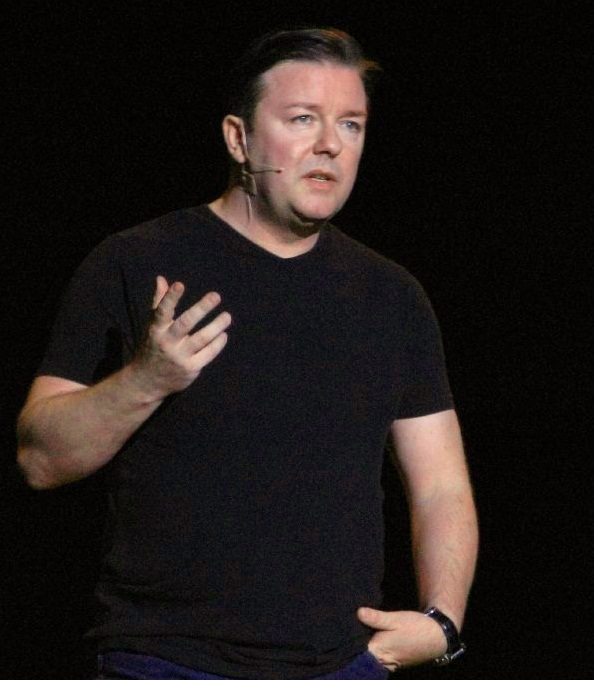
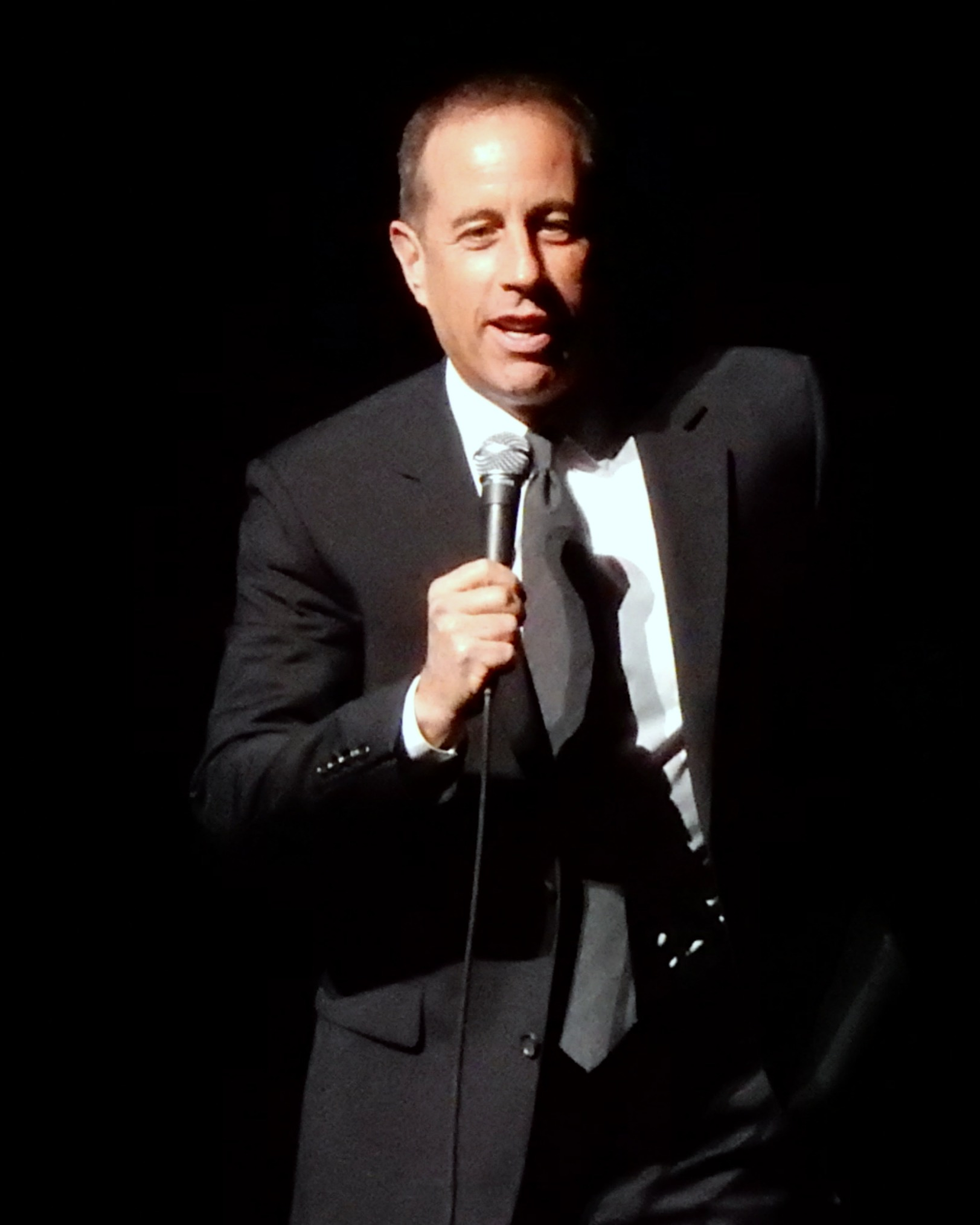
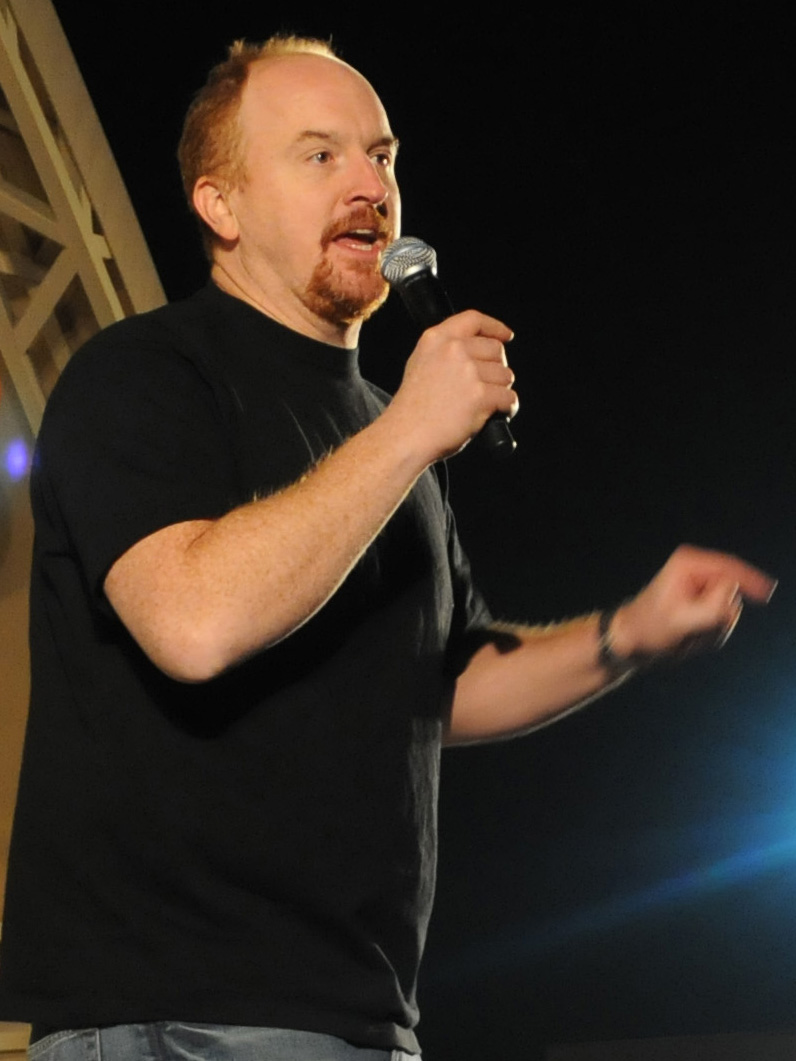
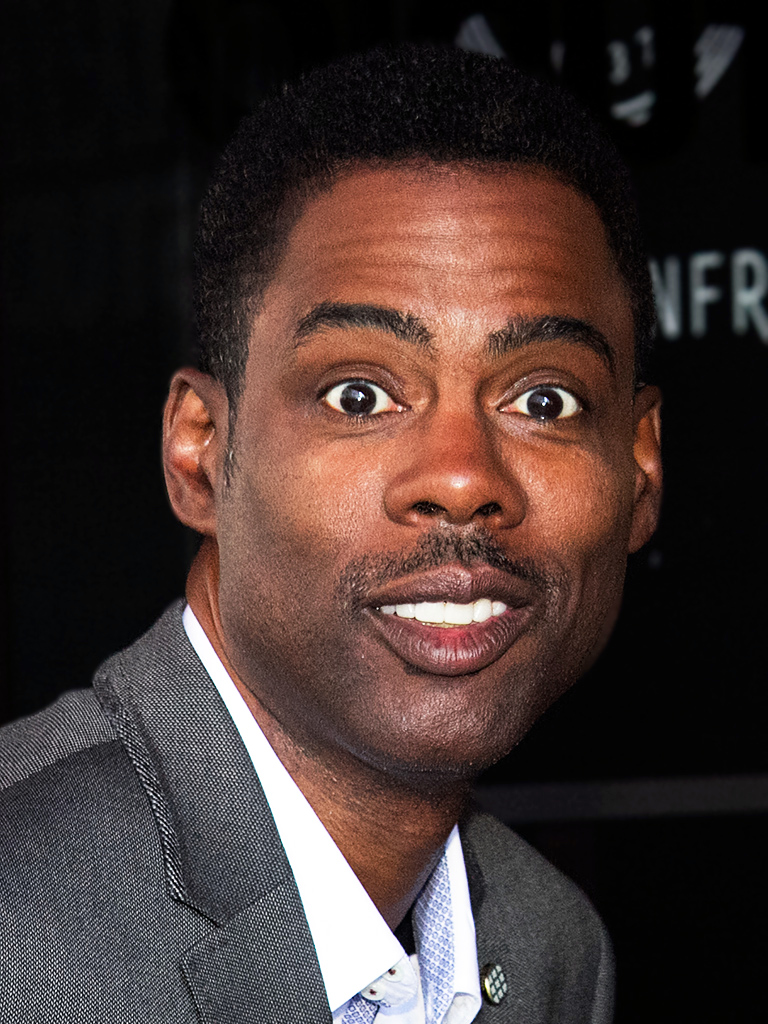
The performances of (left to right) Ricky Gervais, Jerry Seinfeld, and Louis C.K. and Chris Rock.

The review aggregator website Metacritic gave the television special a 75% rating, indicating generally favorable reviews. Ben Wicks of BBC wrote, "Imagine Richard Pryor, Bill Cosby, Don Rickles, and George Carlin all gathered in a room, circa 1979, musing wittily on the secrets of their success. This is the closest approximation to such a summit we’re gonna get".

Critic Kevin Jagernauth from IndieWire gave a mixed review stating, "Neither as deep or delightful as it wants to be, “Talking Funny” shows us four guys having a great time hanging out with each other and makes us wish we were having as much fun watching it as they did making it."

Annie Barrett from Entertainment Weekly praised the show for its "intellectual discussion", and that she wished "this were a weekly series instead of a one-time special. Even a podcast would work." She elaborated saying, "My favorite thing about the special was that these four guys have very different approaches to comedy."

Variety critic Brian Lowry, criticized the special for its loose nature, saying "[Talking Funny] isn't perceptive enough to stick in your head", however he praised the chemistry between the four comedians, saying "the special is interesting enough that again watching these four guys (or perhaps another assorted quartet) sit around bullshitting isn't an unattractive thought."
