= Sincerely Louis CK =

2020 stand-up comedy film

Sincerely Louis C.K.
- Directed by: Louis C.K.
- Written by: Louis C.K.
- Produced by: Ron Allchin; Louis C.K. Lea Cohen; Anthony Giordano; Brady Nasfell
- Starring: Louis C.K.
- Cinematography: Paul Koestner
- Edited by: Louis C.K.
- Distributed by: Louis C.K.
- Release date: April 4, 2020
- Running time: 60 minutes
- Country: United States
- Language: English

Sincerely Louis C.K. is a stand-up comedy film by American comedian Louis C.K. released on April 4, 2020. Filmed in 2020 in Washington, D.C., it is C.K.'s first stand-up performance to be released following his admission to several acts of sexual misconduct in 2017. It was published through his website for download and streaming for $7.99 with no advance notice. It received the Grammy Award for Best Comedy Album at the 64th Annual Grammy Awards.

== Production ==
In the credits, C.K. thanked various people, including comedians Dave Chappelle, Chris Rock, Bill Burr, Jimmy Carr, Norm Macdonald, Joe Rogan, and Kevin Brennan (who opened for C.K. during the taping of the special), as well as Bob Dylan, and his girlfriend Blanche Gardin. He dedicated the special to his mother who had died in 2019.

== Reception ==
Rotten Tomatoes gives the show an 80% rating based on five reviews.

In his three-star review, Brian Logan of The Guardian argued that some of the material was "wickedly good", but also critiqued C.K. for the "self-pity" he displayed in his set.

Kyle Smith of National Review argued that "Louis C.K. Remains Brilliant", and also critiqued the headlines of entertainment outlets such as Variety stating, "Critics seem to be trying to shame C.K.'s viewers away from his act by warning them it contains inappropriate ideas ... it's been more than half a century since Lenny Bruce, but suddenly making jokes about 'touchy subjects' is beyond the pale?"

Some critics criticized C.K., and argued that the public deserved an honest and frank discussion about the instances of sexual misconduct, and that said discussion must be a part of this special. Other reviewers commended him for how he addressed his misconduct, with right-wing blogger Christian Toto declaring "The special grows stronger toward the end, and his final reflections on 'you know what' prove illuminating and funny."
