= Louis C.K. =

American comedian, actor and filmmaker (born 1967)

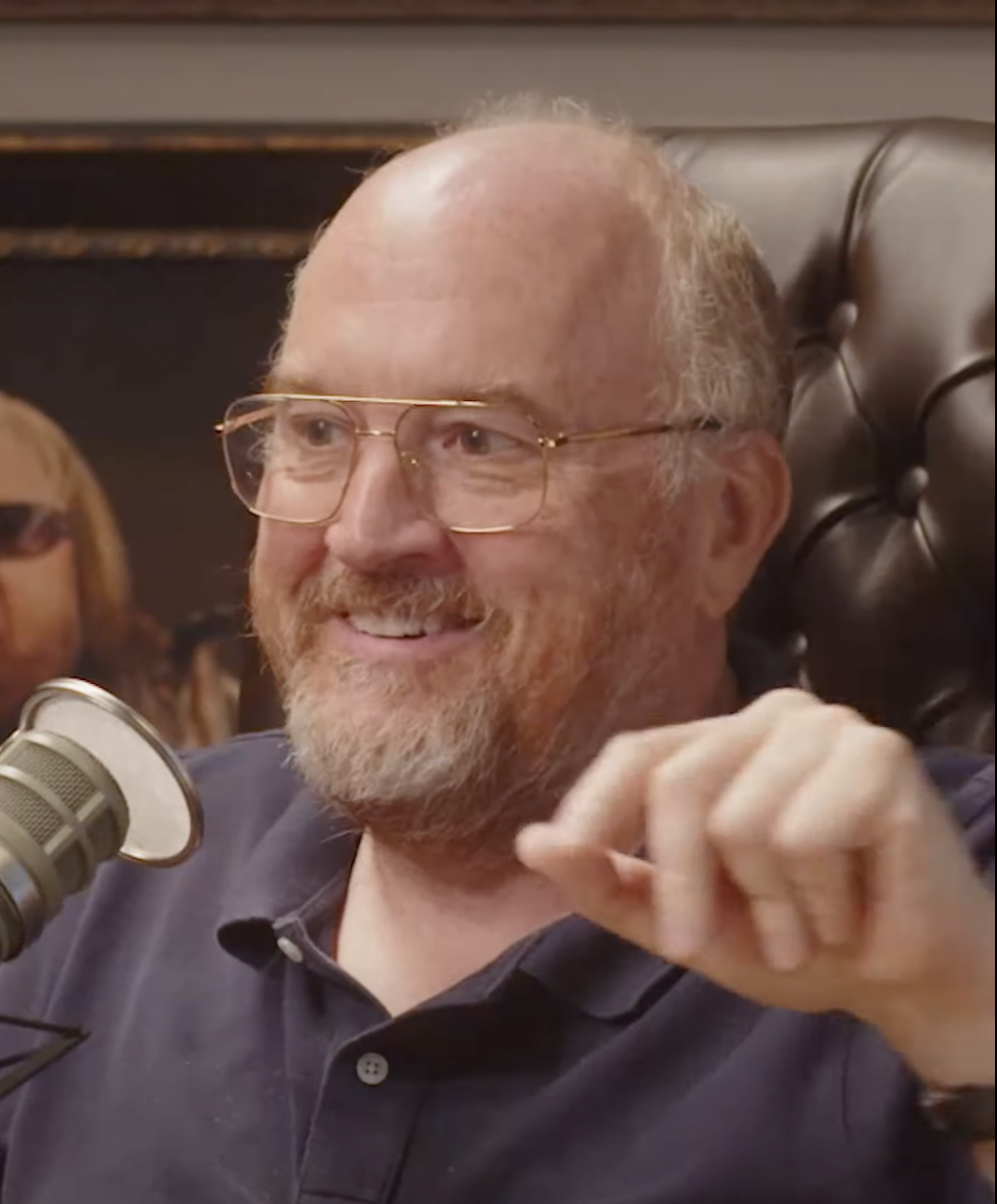
- C.K. in 2022
- Born: Louis Alfred Székely; September 12, 1967 (age 59); Washington, D.C., U.S.
- Spouse: Alix Bailey (m. 1995; div. 2008)
- Children: 2

Comedy career
- Years active: 1984–present
- Medium: Stand-up; television; film
- Genres: Observational comedy; black comedy; blue comedy; insult comedy; cringe comedy; surreal humor; satire; deadpan
- Subjects: Everyday life; human interaction; human behavior; social awkwardness; sex; marriage; family; gender differences; racism; self-deprecation; current events; pop culture
- Website: louisck.com

Louis Alfred Székely (/ˈluːi ˌseɪˈkeɪ/; born September 12, 1967), known professionally as Louis C.K. (/ˈluːi ˌsiːˈkeɪ/), (Note: C.K.'s stage name is an approximate English pronunciation of his Hungarian surname, Székely [ˈseːkɛj], as he explained on The Tavis Smiley Show on September 25, 2009.) is an American stand-up comedian, actor and filmmaker. C.K. has won six Emmy Awards, and three Grammy Awards, three Critics' Choice Awards, three Peabody Awards and a Screen Actors Guild Award as well as nominations for two Golden Globe Awards. He was listed as one of Time Magazine's 100 Most Influential People in 2012 and Rolling Stone ranked him fourth on its 2017 list of the 50 best stand-up comics of all time.

C.K. began his career in the 1990s writing for comedians including David Letterman, Conan O'Brien, Dana Carvey, Chris Rock, and Saturday Night Live. He was also directing surreal short films and directed two features—Tomorrow Night (1998) and Pootie Tang (2001). In 2001, C.K. released his debut comedy album, Live in Houston, directly through his website and became among the first performers to offer direct-to-fan sales of tickets to his stand-up shows and DRM-free video concert downloads via his website. He became prolific releasing nine comedy albums, often directing and editing his specials as well. These specials include Shameless (2007), Chewed Up (2008), Hilarious (2010), and Oh My God (2013).

He gained prominence and widespread acclaim for his FX semi-autobiographical comedy-drama series Louie (2010–2015), which he created, directed and starred in. The series received many accolades with C.K. winning two Primetime Emmy Award for Outstanding Writing in a Comedy Series. In 2016, he created and starred in his self-funded web series Horace and Pete, and co-created the shows Baskets and Better Things for FX. In film, he acted in American Hustle (2013), Blue Jasmine (2013), Trumbo (2015), and The Secret Life of Pets (2016).

In 2017, he admitted to several incidents of sexual misconduct following the release of an article in The New York Times. This resulted in widespread criticism and caused his 2017 film I Love You, Daddy to be pulled from distribution prior to its release. In 2018, he returned to stand-up comedy, and in 2019, he announced an international tour. He has also released the specials Sincerely Louis C.K. (2020) and Sorry (2021) on his website, receiving a Grammy Award for Best Comedy Album for the former. C.K. also co-wrote and directed the film Fourth of July (2022).

== Early life ==
Louis Alfred Székely was born in Washington, D.C., on September 12, 1967, the son of software engineer Mary Louise (née Davis) and economist Luis Székely. He has three sisters. His father is of Mexican and Hungarian-Jewish descent. C.K.'s Jewish paternal grandfather, Géza Székely Schweiger, had immigrated from Hungary to Mexico; he and his Mexican wife, Rosario Sánchez Morales, raised their children in the Catholic faith. C.K.'s mother, an American, was a Catholic with Irish ancestry.

When C.K. was an infant, his family moved to his father's home country of Mexico, where his father had earned a degree from the National Autonomous University of Mexico prior to graduating from Harvard. C.K.'s first language was Spanish; it was not until after they moved back to the U.S. when he was 7 that he began to learn English. He has said that he has since forgotten much of his Spanish. C.K.'s family left Mexico and moved back to the United States, settling in the Boston area, initially for a year in Framingham, Massachusetts.

Upon moving from Mexico to suburban Boston, C.K. wanted to become a writer and comedian, citing George Carlin, Bill Cosby and Richard Pryor as some of his influences. When he was 10, his parents divorced. C.K. said that his father was around but he did not see him much and when he remarried, C.K.'s father converted to Orthodox Judaism, the faith of his new wife and the birth heritage of his paternal grandfather, which his father had begun to explore while studying at Harvard. C.K. and his three sisters were raised by their single mother in Newton, Massachusetts. The fact that his mother had only "bad" TV shows to view upon returning home from work inspired him to work on television. C.K.'s mother raised their children as Catholic and they attended after-school Catholic class until they completed communion. C.K. has said that his father's whole family still lives in Mexico. C.K.'s paternal uncle Dr. Francisco Székely is an academic and an international consultant on environmental affairs who served as Mexico's Deputy Minister of Environment (2000–2003).

C.K. attended Newton North High School and graduated in 1985. He graduated with future Friends star Matt LeBlanc. After graduation, C.K. worked as an auto mechanic and at a public access TV cable station in Boston. According to C.K., working in public access TV gave him the tools and technical knowledge to make his short films and later his television shows. "Learning is my favorite thing", he said. He also worked for a time as a cook and in a video store.

== Career ==
=== 1984–1997: Career beginnings ===
In 1984 at 17, C.K. directed the comedic short film Trash Day. The New York University Tisch School of the Arts showed an interest in him as a filmmaker, but he instead decided to pursue a career in stand-up comedy. C.K.'s first attempt at stand-up was in 1985 at an open mic night at a comedy club in Boston, Massachusetts, during the apex of the comedy boom. He was given five minutes of time, but had only two minutes of material. He was so discouraged by the experience that he did not perform again for two years. As Boston's comedy scene grew, C.K. gradually achieved success, performing alongside acts such as Denis Leary and Lenny Clarke, and eventually he moved up to paid gigs, opening for Jerry Seinfeld and hosting comedy clubs until he moved to Manhattan in 1989. He performed his act on many televised programs, including Evening at the Improv and Star Search. C.K.'s short film Ice Cream (1993), was submitted to the Aspen Shortsfest in 1994.

In 1993, he unsuccessfully auditioned for Saturday Night Live, although he did later work with Robert Smigel, writing on the TV Funhouse shorts for the program. C.K.'s earliest writing job was for Conan O'Brien on the late-night talk show Late Night with Conan O'Brien from 1993 to 1994, before briefly writing for Late Show with David Letterman in 1995. C.K. has stated that Conan O'Brien kept C.K. in comedy by hiring him, as he planned to quit comedy the following day if he had not been hired for Late Night with Conan O'Brien.

Throughout the spring of 1996, C.K. served as the head writer for The Dana Carvey Show; its writers also included Steve Carell, Stephen Colbert, Robert Smigel, and Charlie Kaufman. It was canceled after seven episodes. In 1996, HBO released his first half-hour comedy special. C.K. appeared several times on the animated show Dr. Katz, Professional Therapist.

From 1997 to 1999, he wrote for The Chris Rock Show. His work on the show was nominated for a Primetime Emmy Award for writing three times, winning "Best Writing in a Variety or Comedy Series" in 1999. He was also nominated for an Emmy for his work writing for Late Night with Conan O'Brien. He has been quoted as describing his approach to writing as a "deconstruction" that is both painful and frightening.

=== 1998–2004: Focus on filmmaking ===
In 1998, C.K. wrote and directed the independent black-and-white film Tomorrow Night, which premiered at Sundance, marking his feature film directorial debut after making several shorter films, including six short films for the sketch comedy show Howie Mandel's Sunny Skies (1995) on the Showtime cable network. C.K. self-released Tomorrow Night in 2014. He hosted the PBS show ShortCuts in 1999, which featured independent short films, including some made by C.K. himself. Also that year, C.K. devised and starred in The Filthy Stupid Talent Show, a mock talent show television special. He had an early acting role in the independent comedy Tuna, alongside Nick Offerman, in 2000 and performed on the stand-up showcase series Comedy Central Presents the following year.

C.K. wrote and directed the feature film Pootie Tang (2001), which was adapted from a sketch that was featured on The Chris Rock Show and featured Chris Rock in a supporting role. The film received largely negative reviews from critics, but has become a cult classic; in a half-star review, Roger Ebert declared it a "train wreck" and felt the film was "not in a releasable condition". Though C.K. is credited as the director, he was fired at the end of filming with the film being re-edited by the studio. C.K. has since co-written two screenplays with Rock: Down to Earth (2001) and I Think I Love My Wife (2007). His first comedy album, Live in Houston, was released in 2001. In 2002, he voiced Brendon Small's estranged father, Andrew Small, in the animated sitcom Home Movies. C.K. was among the writing staff of the sketch comedy show Cedric the Entertainer Presents (2002–03).

=== 2005–2009: Lucky Louie and stand-up breakthrough ===
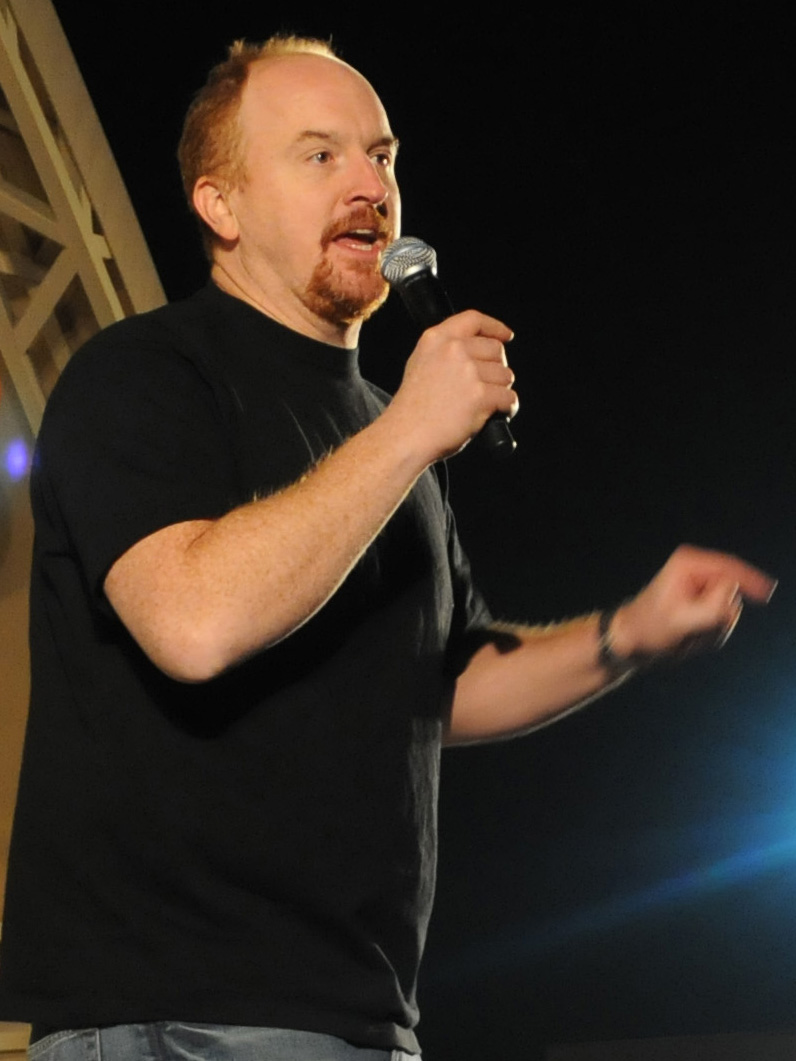
Louis C.K. performing in Kuwait, December 2008

In August 2005, C.K. starred in a half-hour HBO special as part of the stand-up series One Night Stand. Inspired by the work ethic of fellow comedian George Carlin, who had committed to dropping all of his existing material and starting over every year, in June 2006, C.K. starred in and wrote Lucky Louie, a sitcom he created. The series premiered on HBO and was videotaped in front of a studio audience; it was HBO's first series in that format. Lucky Louie is described as a bluntly realistic portrayal of family life. HBO canceled the series after its first season.

C.K. was a part of Opie and Anthony's Traveling Virus Comedy Tour with other comedians in 2007. In 2007, he hosted a three-hour phone-in show on the service at the request of Opie & Anthony, during which he advised callers on their relationship troubles. During an interview with Secretary of Defense Donald Rumsfeld on the show, C.K. repeatedly asked Rumsfeld whether he is in fact a reptilian space alien who "eats Mexican babies". Rumsfeld declined to comment and the video has since gone viral. He appeared in three films in 2008: Welcome Home Roscoe Jenkins, Diminished Capacity, and Role Models.

C.K. launched his first hour-long special, Shameless, in 2007, which aired on HBO and was later released on DVD. In 2015, Rolling Stone ranked C.K.'s stand-up special Shameless number three on their "Divine Comedy: 25 Best Stand-Up Specials and Movies of All Time" list In March 2008, he recorded a second hour-long special, Chewed Up, which premiered on Showtime Network on October 4, 2008, and was nominated for a Primetime Emmy Award for Outstanding Writing for a Comedy or Variety Special. C.K. and his wife Alix Bailey divorced in 2008, with C.K. and Bailey sharing joint custody of their children. In a 2010 interview, C.K. talked about how, after his divorce, he thought, "well, there goes my act." He alluded to the way that his marriage had been central to his act and his life, and he said that it took him approximately a year to realize "I'm accumulating stories here that are worth telling." One element in his preparation for stand-up was training at the same boxing gym as Lowell, Massachusetts fighter Micky Ward, trying to "learn how to ... do the grunt work and the boring, constant training so that you'll be fit enough to take the beating." A clip from an appearance by C.K. on Late Night with Conan O'Brien in October 2008 titled "Everything's Amazing and Nobody is Happy" became a viral hit on YouTube in 2009, helping his standup career to propel forward.

On April 18, 2009, C.K. recorded a concert film titled Hilarious. Unlike his previous specials—which had all been produced for television networks—Hilarious was produced independently, directed by C.K. himself, and sold to Epix and Comedy Central after it was complete. As a result, it was not released until late 2010. It was published on DVD and CD in 2011. It is the first stand-up comedy film accepted into the Sundance Film Festival. From 2009 to 2012, C.K. played Dave Sanderson, a police officer and ex-boyfriend of Leslie Knope (played by Amy Poehler) in the sitcom Parks and Recreation. He also co-starred in the romantic comedy fantasy film The Invention of Lying, directed by and starring Ricky Gervais, in 2009.

=== 2011–2016: Louie, Horace and Pete and film roles ===
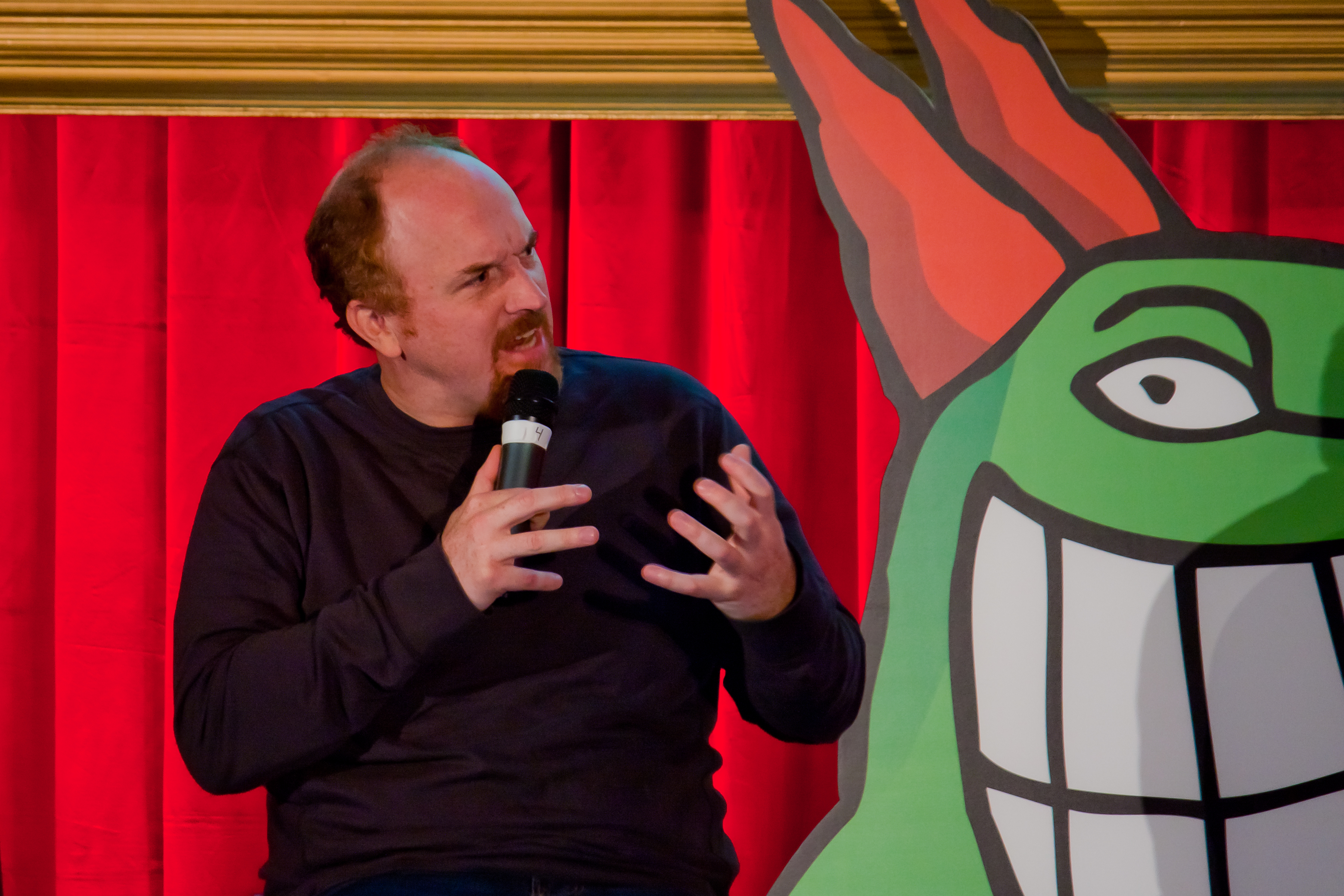
Louis C.K. performing in Montreal, July 2011

FX picked up C.K.'s series Louie in August 2009, which C.K. stars in, writes, directs, and edits. The show features stand-up routines blended with segments partially based on his offstage experiences which address his life as a divorced, aging father. The show premiered on June 29, 2010. In season three, episodes dealt respectively with a date with an unstable bookshop clerk (played by Parker Posey); a doomed attempt to replace a retiring David Letterman; an aborted visit to C.K.'s father; and a dream-reality New Year's Eve episode in which C.K. ends up in China. These episodes were ranked in critic Matt Zoller Seitz's favorite 25 comedy episodes of 2012. Seitz called the episode "New Year's Eve" "truly audacious". C.K. has been nominated five times for the Primetime Emmy Award for Outstanding Lead Actor in a Comedy Series (2011–2015) for his work in Louie, and won two Emmys in 2011 – for the Louie episode "Pregnant" and for his special Live at the Beacon Theater.

The show was renewed for a fourth season; with a 19-month hiatus after season 3 to accommodate C.K.'s roles in David O. Russell's American Hustle and Woody Allen's Blue Jasmine in 2013. During the 2014 Television Critics Association presentations, FX Networks' John Landgraf reported that Louie would return in spring 2015 for a shortened fifth season of seven episodes—compared to the 13 episodes of prior seasons. The fifth season premiered in April 2015 and an announcement said the series would take an "extended hiatus" in August 2015; C.K. stated in January 2016 that he "just doesn't know" whether it would return or not. In November 2017, in the wake of the misconduct allegations against C.K, FX cut ties with the embattled comic and filmmaker, ending their partnership. In 2018, however, FX CEO John Landgraf stated to Variety, "I love Louie and I love Louis C.K.'s work and I miss him, and I miss it," and that "the network is ready to welcome C.K. back and is eager for Louie season six". In 2011, C.K. joined fellow comedians Jerry Seinfeld, Chris Rock, and Ricky Gervais for a discussion of comedy in Talking Funny, a one-hour television special that aired on HBO.

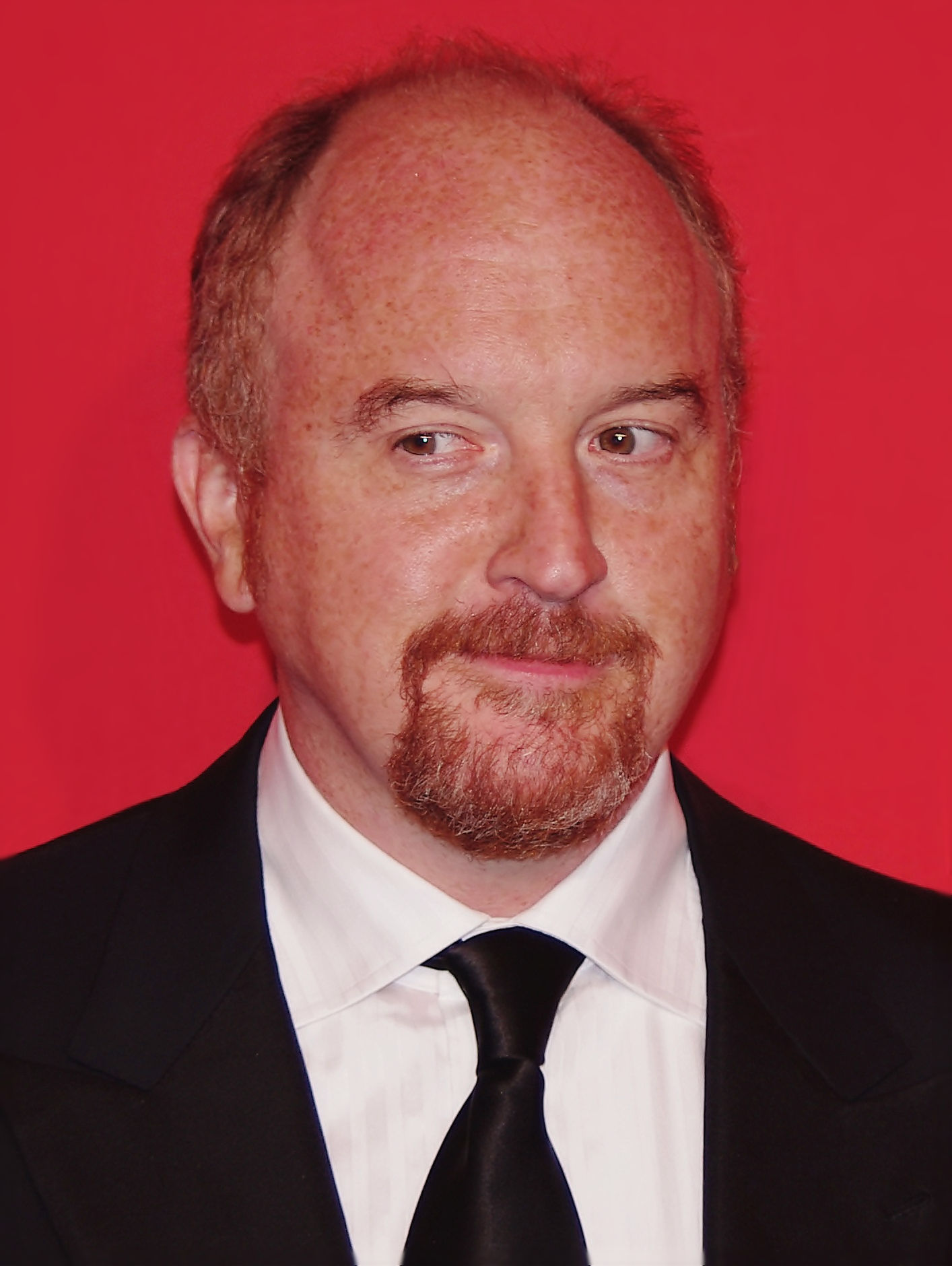
C.K. at the 2012 Time gala

On December 10, 2011, C.K. released his fourth full-length special, Live at the Beacon Theater. Like Hilarious, it was produced independently and directed by C.K. However, unlike his earlier work, it was distributed digitally on his website, foregoing both physical and broadcast media. C.K. released the special for $5.00 and without DRM, hoping that these factors and the direct relationship between the artist and consumer would effectively deter illegal downloading. At the end of the special, the release of a new album, recorded at Carnegie Hall the previous year, is mentioned. By December 21, 2011, the sales of the special from C.K.'s website had already earned him over $1 million. C.K. hosted Saturday Night Live on November 3, 2012, and was subsequently Primetime Emmy Award-nominated for Outstanding Guest Actor in a Comedy Series. The success of the special prompted other comedians, including Jim Gaffigan, Joe Rogan, and Aziz Ansari, to release their own specials with a similar business model. On May 11, 2012, C.K. additionally made two audio-only downloads available for $5.00 each: WORD – Live at Carnegie Hall (and the audio version of his first HBO stand-up special, Shameless), as well as an audio-only version of Live at the Beacon Theater. C.K.'s fifth one-hour special, Oh My God, was recorded at the Celebrity Theatre in Phoenix, Arizona, and premiered on HBO April 13, 2013. It was also sold and distributed using the same model as C.K. used for Live at the Beacon Theater.

In 2013, C.K. appeared in critically acclaimed films, the first being Woody Allen's Blue Jasmine where he played the romantic interest of Sally Hawkins' character. C.K. originally auditioned for the role that went to Andrew Dice Clay, and Allen offered Louie the role that ended up in the film. Of the experience, C.K. stated, "I had this three-day part and I figured I'm a tourist on this movie. All I want is a little Woody moment to take home with me. It was so fun, and we had lunch, and I thought having lunch with him was my rewarding moment. And then after lunch, we shot one more scene and I got a big laugh on the set, and I thought, that's my Woody moment". Later that year, C.K. starred in David O. Russell's black comedy crime film American Hustle, which was released in December 2013. C.K. played the role of FBI supervisor Stoddard Thorsen, the boss of Bradley Cooper's character. The film was a financial and critical hit, earning 10 Academy Awards nominations including Best Picture. C.K. earned a Screen Actors Guild Award for Outstanding Cast in a Motion Picture.

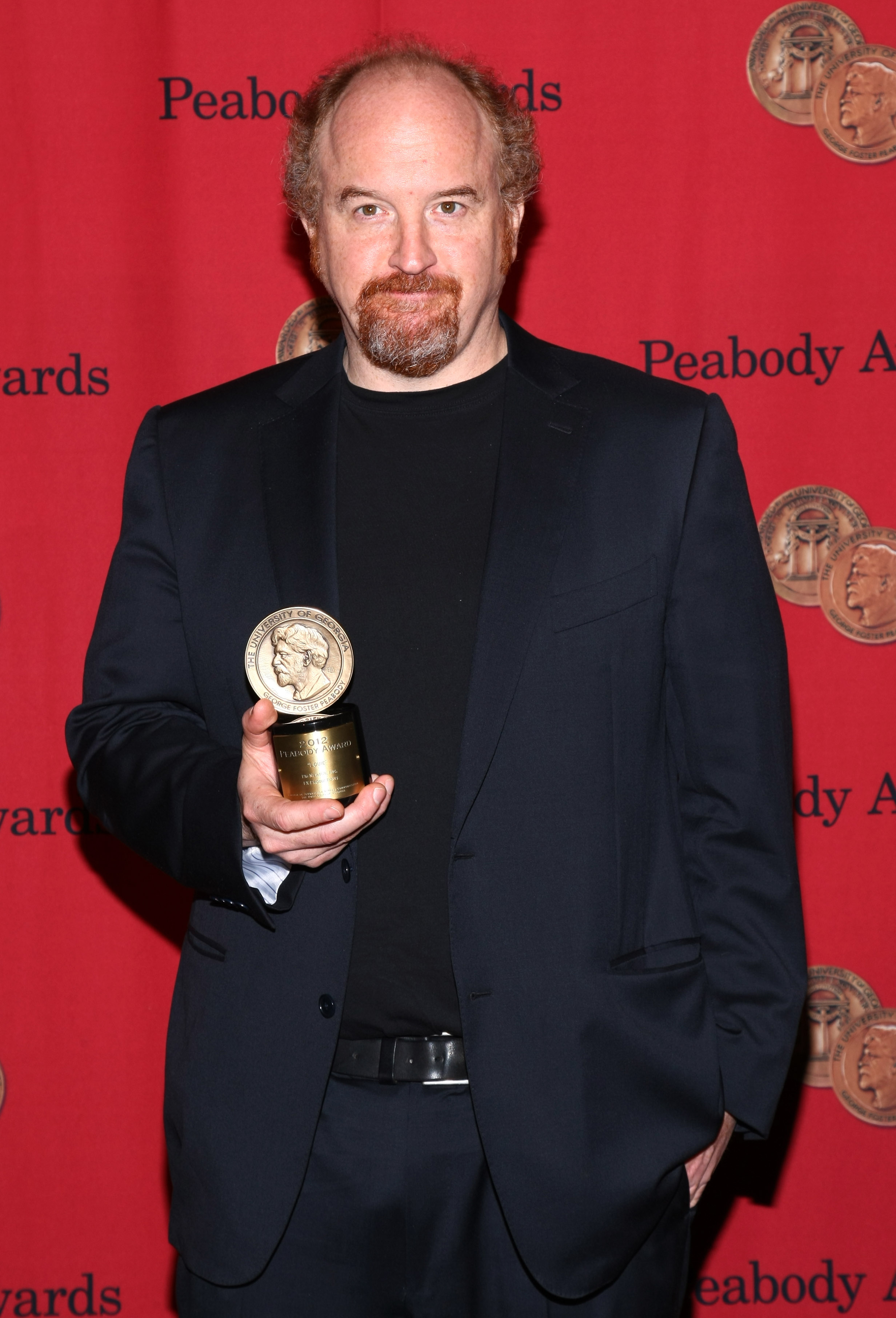
C.K. at the Peabody Awards, 2013

C.K.'s production company, Pig Newton, where he works with producer Blair Breard, signed a contract to develop and executive produce pilots for FX Networks in 2013. In January 2014, an announcement said C.K. would produce and co-write a Zach Galifianakis–created comedy pilot for FX Networks. The 10-episode single-camera comedy, titled Baskets, premiered on January 21, 2016. It features Galifianakis as the main character, a struggling clown named Chip Baskets in a pilot episode written by Galifianakis, Louis C.K. and Jonathan Krisel. C.K. released his sixth one-hour special Live at the Comedy Store to his website in January 2015, which, unlike his past few specials, was recorded at a club, The Comedy Store in West Hollywood. C.K. said he intended the material as an exercise in creating an act that hearkened back to his early days in comedy clubs. The special premiered exclusively on FX on May 28, 2015.

He returned to host Saturday Night Live on March 29, 2014, and May 16, 2015, and received Emmy Award nominations for Outstanding Guest Actor in a Comedy Series for both episodes. C.K. also attended the Saturday Night Live 40th Anniversary Special, where he was chosen to introduce a montage of the pre-recorded sketches. In May 2015, it was announced that C.K. would write, direct, and star in the film I'm a Cop, to be produced by Scott Rudin, Dave Becky, and Blair Breard, with a budget of $8 million, although he later canceled the project. C.K. became the first comedian to sell out Madison Square Garden three times in a single tour in 2015. Audio from the tour was released by C.K. on his website as Louis C.K.: Live at Madison Square Garden through the pay what you want model. In November 2015, C.K. co-starred in the biographical drama film Trumbo as a composite character based on five screenwriters who were blacklisted in Hollywood for their alleged ties to the Communist party during the 1940s. (Note: His character, Arlen Hird, is a composite of Alvah Bessie, Lester Cole, John Howard Lawson, Albert Maltz and Samuel Ornitz.) He executive-produced the pilot for the Amazon Video black comedy series One Mississippi, starring Notaro, in November 2015. It was ordered for a full season by Amazon. In January 2016 C.K. and actor/comedian Albert Brooks were rumored to create, write, executive produce, and provide the voices for the two main characters in an animated series pilot for FX. The following January, the series was announced to instead be premiering on TBS in 2018 and titled The Cops, following two Los Angeles patrolmen.

On January 30, 2016, he released the first episode of the tragicomic drama series Horace and Pete to his website, without any prior announcements. C.K. directed, wrote, and starred in the series as bar owner Horace, alongside Steve Buscemi, who portrays co-owner Pete. Horace and Pete pioneered the genre of 'sadcom'. James Poniewozik of The New York Times said the series "may best be described as a Cheers spec script by Eugene O'Neill: a snapshot of a family—and a country—suffering a hangover decades in the making." The self-financed series received a significantly positive reaction from critics, who largely focused on the performances of the veteran cast that includes C.K., Buscemi, Edie Falco, Steven Wright, Alan Alda, and Jessica Lange and C.K.'s writing. C.K. has expressed his interest in a second season.

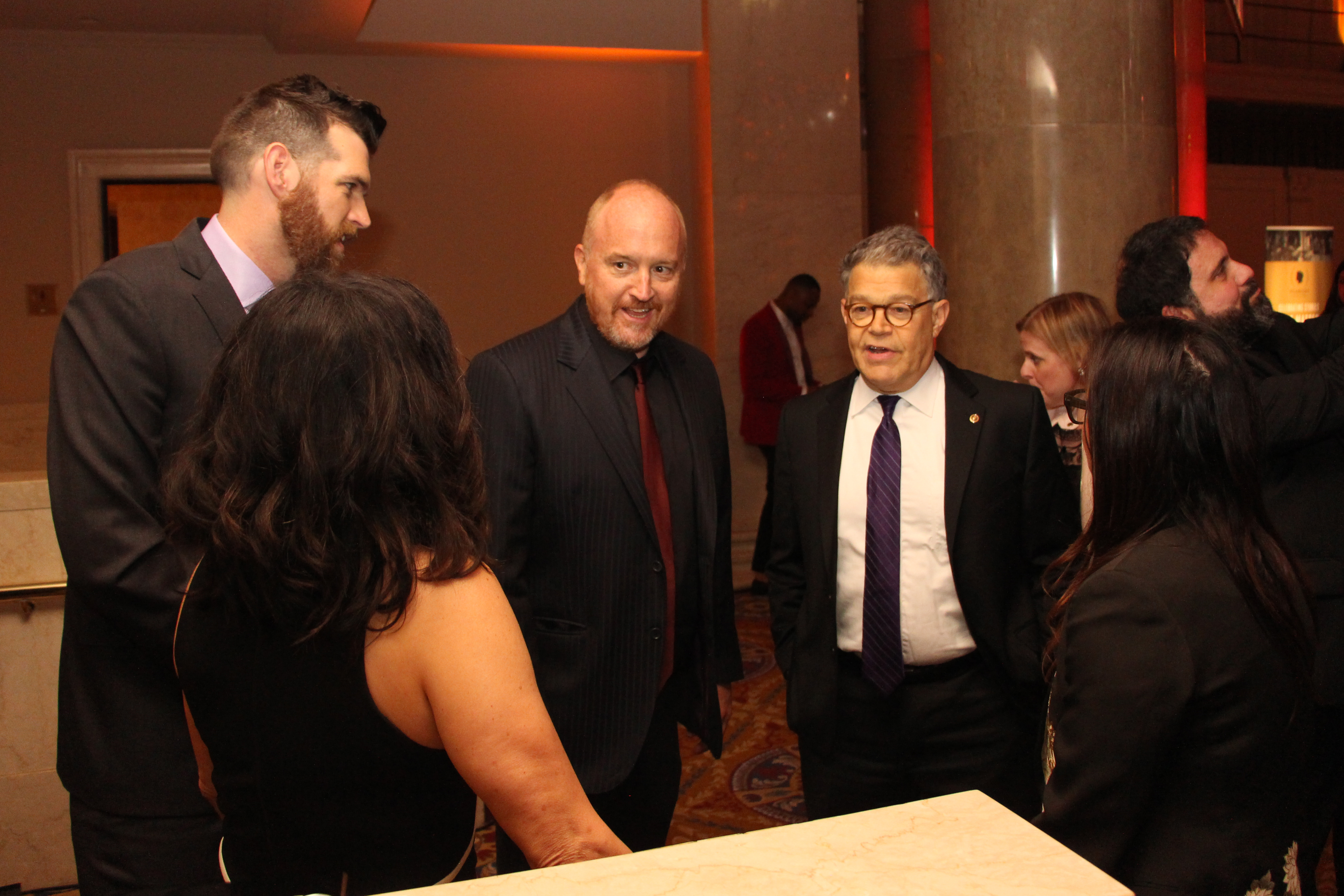
Timothy Simons, Julia Louis-Dreyfus, Al Franken, Louis C.K., and Pamela Adlon at the Peabody Awards in 2017

C.K. next voiced the lead, Max, a Jack Russell Terrier, in the animated comedy film The Secret Life of Pets. The film was co-directed by Chris Renaud of the Despicable Me series, and was released on July 8, 2016. It grossed over $875 million worldwide. C.K. developed the series Better Things with its star Pamela Adlon, who had appeared on Louie. C.K. co-wrote, co-produced, and directed the pilot. The show is about a single working actress mother and her struggles to raise three daughters. It premiered in September 2016 on FX. His stand-up special 2017 was filmed in Washington, D.C., and released on April 4, 2017, through the streaming service Netflix. Barry Crimmins's stand-up special, Whatever Threatens You, directed and produced by C.K., was released through his website in 2016. On April 8, 2017, he hosted Saturday Night Live for a fourth time, where he received strong reviews for his opening monologue in which he tackled white privilege, and bits about a racist chicken, and talking animals. A critic from The A.V. Club wrote " no one's better at taking a joke to the edge and tiptoeing nimbly along it". C.K. also honored fellow comedian Don Rickles who died that week, saying during the goodnights portion stating, "I just want to say, Don Rickles was the funniest man in the world and he was also a lovely, beautiful guy. I'll miss him for the rest of my life".

C.K. directed the film I Love You, Daddy in secret, shooting entirely on black and white 35 mm film in June 2017. The film follows a television producer and writer played by C.K. called Glen Topher whose teenage daughter, played by Chloë Grace Moretz, is seduced by a much older film director (John Malkovich), causing Topher to become disconcerted. The film also features Charlie Day, Adlon, Rose Byrne, Edie Falco and Helen Hunt. It premiered at the 2017 Toronto International Film Festival in September, whereupon The Guardian film critic Peter Bradshaw gave the film a four-star review, calling it a "very funny and recklessly provocative homage to Woody Allen, channeling his masterpiece Manhattan."

=== 2017: Sexual misconduct allegations and fallout ===
In 2015, rumors about C.K.'s behavior toward women in his professional life began to appear on various websites, from high-profile sources such as Roseanne Barr, Jen Kirkman, and Tig Notaro. Two years later, in a September 2017 Vanity Fair interview, comedian Notaro cut ties with C.K., a one-time collaborator and producer on her show One Mississippi, saying that he should address the rumors of sexual impropriety, and alluding to an unspecified "incident" between herself and C.K. As he had in the past, C.K. denied the allegations in a September 2017 New York Times interview, saying: "They're rumors, that's all that is ... I don't think talking about that stuff in the press ... is a good idea." On November 9, 2017, The Orchard, distributor of C.K.'s then-upcoming film I Love You, Daddy, canceled the New York premiere of the film due to "unexpected circumstances".

Later that day, The New York Times published allegations of sexual misconduct from five women against C.K. The women who spoke out in the article included comedy duo Dana Min Goodman and Julia Wolov, who claimed that C.K. had invited them to his hotel room in 2002 during the US Comedy Arts Festival where he masturbated in front of them. They relayed the incident to ImprovOlympics founder Charna Halpern. Comedian Rebecca Corry stated that when they were on the set of a television pilot in 2005, C.K. offered to masturbate in front of her and she declined. Corry reported the incident and no action was taken. Comedian Abby Schachner alleged that C.K. masturbated while they were on the phone describing the conduct as "unprofessional and inappropriate". Both Corry and Schachner stated that C.K. privately apologized for his past behavior several years later.

In response to The New York Times reporting, C.K. released a statement apologizing and admitting guilt, writing, "These stories are true" and saying that while he initially thought "it was okay because I never showed a woman my dick without asking first". He went on to express remorse, stating, "the power I had over these women is that they admired me. And I wielded that power irresponsibly." He stated: "I have spent my long and lucky career talking and saying anything I want. I will now step back and take a long time to listen."

Following the scandal, C.K. suffered repercussions, stating in 2018 that the fallout had taken him through "hell and back" and cost him approximately $35 million in lost income. The release and distribution of his film I Love You, Daddy was cancelled, and FX Networks and Netflix cut ties with C.K. HBO dropped C.K.'s appearance on an upcoming Night of Too Many Stars television special and removed his content from their on-demand services. C.K.'s manager Dave Becky, who was under fire for allegedly making threatening statements, dropped C.K. as a client. TBS suspended production of, and eventually scrapped, its animated series The Cops, co-created with Albert Brooks. His voice was either replaced or removed from projects such as Illumination's The Secret Life of Pets 2 and Disney Channel's Gravity Falls.

=== 2018–2023: Return to stand-up comedy ===
On August 26, 2018, C.K. made an unannounced appearance at the Comedy Cellar in Manhattan, New York. It was reported that he received an ovation from the audience and performed a typical set, making no reference to the sexual controversy. His return to stand-up comedy was criticized by comedians, including Aparna Nancherla, Ian Karmel, Allie Goertz, and Judd Apatow as being premature, whereas Dave Chappelle, Chris Rock, Bill Burr, Michael Che, Jim Gaffigan, Janeane Garofalo, Sarah Silverman, Wanda Sykes, Judy Gold, Marlon Wayans, Joe Rogan, and Kurt Metzger supported C.K.'s right to continue standup. Comedian Jerry Seinfeld also supported C.K.'s return to standup but opined that the public may have felt that C.K. had not owned up to his actions enough, saying in October 2018, "We know the routine: The person does something wrong. The person's humiliated. They're exiled. They suffer, we want them to suffer. We love the tumble, we love the crash and bang of the fall. And then we love the crawl-back. The grovel. Are you going to grovel? How long are you going to grovel?" Seinfeld added, "We, the court of public opinion, decided if he's going to come back, he'd better show a lot of pain. Because he denied (the public) that." Edie Falco and Alan Alda who starred in C.K.'s Horace and Pete expressed their hope that he would receive a second chance.

On December 31, 2018, an audience member secretly recorded C.K. working out new material and posted it online, which drew media controversy. Included in his set were jokes about school shootings, which drew a divided reaction from fellow comedians. Ricky Gervais defended C.K.'s jokes, saying "[C.K.'s] got nothing against those [Parkland] kids. It was him pretending to be angry for comedy." In October 2019, C.K. announced in an email to subscribers of his website an international tour of his new material. Following the leak of his new material in December 2018, his future shows would require audience members to lock cell phones and other devices in Yondr pouches, which has become the norm, with comedians Dave Chappelle, John Mulaney, and Aziz Ansari using them as well. Canadian comedian Mark Breslin, owner of Canadian comedy club chain Yuk Yuk's, defended his decision to book C.K. again in Toronto, citing sold out tickets for five shows and a lack of controversy.

In January 2020, C.K. performed an unannounced set, receiving a standing ovation for the eighth annual benefit show for late comedian Patrice O'Neal, a yearly benefit of which comedian Bill Burr is the organizer. Beginning in March 2020, most of C.K.'s shows were canceled due to the COVID-19 pandemic in the United States. On April 4, 2020, C.K. self-released a new stand-up special entitled Sincerely Louis CK through his website without advance notice. The special drew a divided response from audiences, including fellow comedian Amy Schumer, who said, "I laughed at a lot of it. But it's hard to not think of what he has done, what he has and hasn't learned, but I definitely laughed."

C.K. on Your Mom's House in 2022

In July 2020, C.K. released an audio series of conversations between himself and then-girlfriend Blanche Gardin titled Long Distance Relationship. Proceeds would go toward the Fistula Foundation and French charity Fondation Abbé Pierre. On August 4, 2020, C.K. was invited by his longtime friend Dave Chappelle to join him in an installment of his standup series "An Intimate Socially Distanced Affair" at the Wirrig Pavilion in Yellow Springs, Ohio, during the COVID-19 pandemic in the United States. Photos emerged from the event of C.K. with Chappelle, Sarah Silverman, Michelle Wolf, Tiffany Haddish and Common. In October 2020, C.K. appeared in a docu-series titled The Comedy Store about the Los Angeles comedy club of the same name, directed by Mike Binder. In May 2021, following the easing of restrictions in New York City due to the COVID-19 pandemic, C.K. made an unannounced stop at the Village Underground. He then announced upcoming tour-dates for summer 2021 in Atlanta, Nashville and Minneapolis.

In August 2021, C.K. announced a tour of the United States in the year 2021 and international dates for the year 2022. American dates include two nights at the Hulu Theater at Madison Square Garden. The tour rescheduled dates canceled due to COVID-19, acknowledging the ongoing pandemic and safety concerns. On The Joe Rogan Experience in November 2021, comedian Shane Gillis revealed that C.K. had filmed a new special at the Hulu Theater at Madison Square Garden. On December 18, 2021, C.K. announced the release of a new stand-up comedy special, titled Sorry. The special was released for sale through his website, similar to other releases he has done in the past. He also offered a bundling of previous specials for a larger fee. In April 2022, C.K. won the Grammy Award for Best Comedy Album for his special Sincerely, Louis C.K.

In April and May 2022, C.K. appeared as a guest in a series of episodes of Matt and Shane's Secret Podcast, a podcast hosted by comedians Shane Gillis and Matt McCusker. The series is a four-part, six-hour-long discussion on the stories of each U.S. president in order. June 2022 saw the premiere of C.K.'s film Fourth of July, which he produced, directed, and co-wrote with fellow comedian Joe List. The film is a comedy drama that stars List as a recovering alcoholic jazz musician who confronts his emotionally abusive family. To promote the film, rather than using traditional talk shows, C.K. appeared on a number of well-known podcasts, such as The Joe Rogan Experience, Your Mom's House, Long Days with Yannis Pappas, Ari Shaffir's Skeptic Tank, Flagrant 2, and Are You Garbage?.

On January 28, 2023, C.K. performed at a sold-out performance at Madison Square Garden. The event was live recorded and aired on his website as the special, Louis C.K.: Back to the Garden. Following the Madison Square Garden show, C.K. took an extended break.

=== 2025–present: Tour, novel and return to Netflix ===
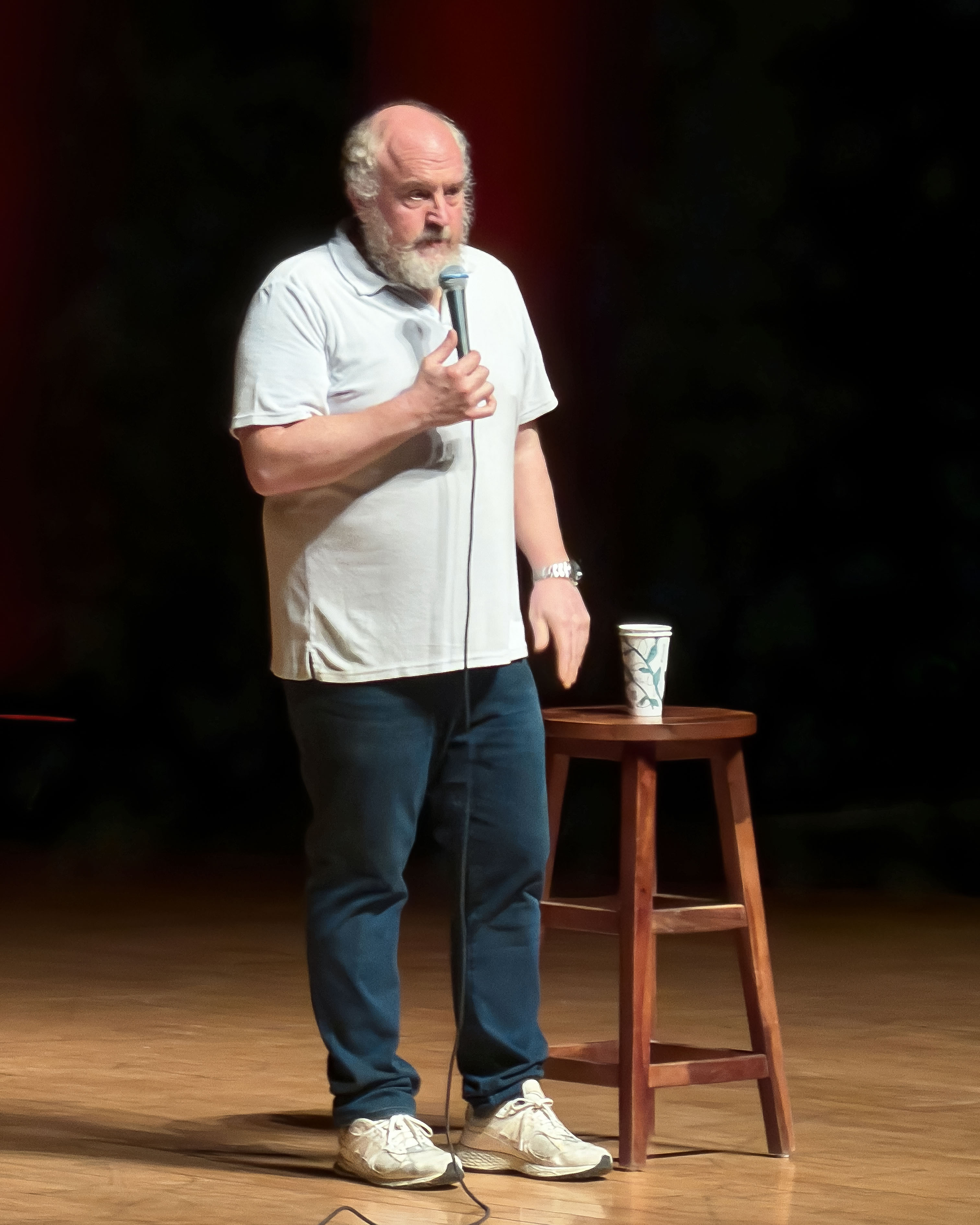
CK performing in India in 2026.

In March 2025, C.K. announced his Ridiculous tour with dates across the world. C.K. announced his debut novel Ingram to be released November 11, 2025.

In a September 2025 podcast interview on Theo Von's This Past Weekend, C.K. confessed ongoing remorse for his past sexual misconduct saying "I really wish I could have a simple kind of watershed where I can say just 'Yes' to everything that happened, and I'm sorry. I really am. And I'm just trying to do better, and I don't think I can prove that to everybody, 'cause it's a private thing. It's a one-to-one man thing. It's not a famous guy act." C.K. also admitted to regularly attending Sex and Love Addicts Anonymous meetings.

In September 2025, C.K. performed at the Riyadh Comedy Festival alongside many comedians such as Aziz Ansari, Bill Burr, Dave Chappelle, Pete Davidson and Kevin Hart. C.K. and the other comedians faced criticism in part due to Saudi Arabia's human rights record. C.K. spoke about the subject on Real Time with Bill Maher saying, "People have been playing Saudi Arabia for years. Comedians have been going and playing Arab countries" while also adding that "[It] just feels like a good opportunity. And I just feel like comedy is a great way to get in and start talking".

In April 2026, it was announced that C.K. would headline a show at The Hollywood Bowl as part of the Netflix Is a Joke comedy festival. On June 30, 2026, his comedy special Ridiculous was released on Netflix, marking his first special released by a major distributor since 2017, when he last partnered with Netflix.

== Influences ==
C.K. has named many comedians whom he admired or who influenced his work, including George Carlin, Woody Allen, Larry David, Joan Rivers, Robin Williams, Steve Martin, Richard Pryor and Bill Cosby. As a filmmaker C.K. has been influenced by the French New Wave, American New Hollywood and surrealist cinema. C.K. has cited filmmakers who have influenced him as being Woody Allen, David Lynch, John Waters, and Luis Buñuel.

== Ticketing innovation ==
C.K. innovated direct-to-consumer distribution, in 2001, when he released his debut comedy album, Live in Houston, directly through his website. He became one of the first performers to use his website to offer direct-to-fan ticket sales for his shows, as well as DRM-free video concert downloads. In this way, C.K. sold tickets for his stand-up tour, circumventing large ticket outlets, bypassing their overhead and the venues they control. C.K. has said the ticket outlets create barriers to consumers, whereas direct distribution has effectively "closed the gap between how easy it was to steal it [versus] how easy it was to buy it". The success of the special prompted other comedians, including Jim Gaffigan, Joe Rogan, and Aziz Ansari, to release their own specials with a similar business model.

== Personal life ==
=== Marriage and relationships ===
C.K. married artist Alix Bailey in 1995. Together, they have two daughters. The couple divorced in 2008. C.K.'s mother, Mary Louise Székely, died on June 3, 2019.

C.K. had a brief relationship with musician Fiona Apple. C.K. confirmed he was dating Blanche Gardin in 2018. In August 2022, he mentioned that they had broken up.

=== Political views ===
About political partisanship, C.K. stated, "Some things I think are very conservative, or very liberal. I think when someone falls into one category for everything, I'm very suspicious. It doesn't make sense to me that you'd have the same solution to every issue."

In March 2016, C.K. sent an email critical of the 2016 presidential race to those subscribed to his mailing list. C.K. stated he hoped for a conservative president but likened Republican Party presidential candidate Donald Trump to Adolf Hitler. He labeled Trump an "insane bigot", also adding, "He's not a monster. He's a sad man." C.K. later referred to the email as "irrational". But he clarified to Stephen Colbert in April 2017 that Trump is not "some new kind of evil" but rather "a gross, crook, dirty, rotten, lying sack of shit", to applause from the Late Show audience.

In March 2020, C.K. donated to Joe Biden's 2020 presidential campaign. However, the campaign said that it has refunded the $2,800 donation from C.K. Neither Biden nor C.K. have released statements regarding the matter.

C.K. is on the record as having voted for the Democratic Party presidential candidate in the 2004, 2008, 2012 and 2016 United States presidential elections.

=== Philanthropy ===
In 2011, by selling Live at the Beacon Theater on his website, C.K. earned a "million dollars in a matter of days, half of which he [gave] away to his staff and charities." Recipients included the Fistula Foundation, Green Chimneys, the Pablove Foundation, Charity: Water, and Kiva.

In 2016, he selected the Fistula Foundation as the beneficiary of his Jeopardy! Power Players Week appearance, and won $50,000 for the charity.

In April 2020, C.K. donated $30,000 to the wait staff at the Comedy Cellar in Greenwich Village during the COVID-19 pandemic in the United States as part of a GoFundMe program called "Tip Your Wait Staff".

=== Religion ===
Louis C.K. was raised Catholic and has identified as an agnostic.

== Filmography ==
Louis C.K. is a writer, director, producer and actor who has acted in many television series, including Lucky Louie (2006), Louie (2010–2015) and Horace and Pete (2016). He has hosted Saturday Night Live four times, in 2012, 2014, 2015 and 2017. He has also appeared in television shows, such as Parks and Recreation and Portlandia. C.K. has also starred in a number of films such as Woody Allen's Blue Jasmine, David O. Russell's American Hustle (both 2013) and Jay Roach's Hollywood blacklist drama Trumbo (2015).

== Comedy releases ==
=== Specials and albums ===
Year	Title	Studio	Formats
2001	Live in Houston	louisck.com	LP/CD/download/streaming (audio only)
2007	Shameless	HBO, louisck.com	Broadcast/DVD/video & audio download/streaming
2008	Chewed Up	Showtime/Image Entertainment, louisck.com	Broadcast/DVD/CD/video & audio download/streaming
2010	Hilarious	Epix, Comedy Central, louisck.com, Netflix	Theatrical/broadcast/DVD/CD/video & audio download/streaming
2011	Live at the Beacon Theater	louisck.com, FX, Netflix	Broadcast/DVD/video & audio download/streaming
2012	Word: Live at Carnegie Hall	louisck.com	Download/streaming (audio only)
2013	Oh My God	HBO, louisck.com	Broadcast/DVD/LP/CD/video & audio download/streaming
2015	Live at the Comedy Store	louisck.com, FX, Netflix	Broadcast/DVD/video & audio download/streaming
2015	Live at Madison Square Garden	louisck.com	LP/download/streaming (audio only)
2017	2017	Netflix	LP/streaming
2020	Sincerely Louis CK	louisck.com	Video & audio download/streaming
2021	Sorry	louisck.com	Video & audio download/streaming
2023	Louis C.K. at The Dolby	louisck.com	Video & audio download/streaming
2023	Back to the Garden	louisck.com	Video download/streaming
2026	Ridiculous	Netflix	Streaming

=== Appearances ===
Year	Title	Studio	Track Information	Formats
1995	"Young Comedians Special"	HBO	Special feature of One Night Stand DVD	Broadcast/DVD (2006)
1996	"HBO Comedy Half-Hour"	HBO	Special feature of Shameless DVD	Broadcast/streaming/DVD (2007)
2000	"Stand Up America"	Laughing Stock	Track 8: "Louis CK"	CD/download (2005)/streaming (2009)
2001	"Comedy Central Presents"	Comedy Central/Paramount	Stand-Up Vault #3 DVD	Broadcast/download/streaming (2010)/DVD (2015)
2003	"Just for Laughs"	Just For Laughs (JFL)	Episode: "Louis CK"	Broadcast/streaming (2010)
2005	"One Night Stand"	HBO	Includes deleted scenes on DVD	Broadcast/streaming/DVD (2006)
2007	"Just for Laughs"	JFL	Episode: "Louis CK II"	Broadcast/streaming (2010)
2007	"We Just Landed!" by Bob & Tom	Friggemall Records	Track 6: "One of Those Couples"	CD
2008	"Comic Relief: The Greatest...And The Latest"	HBO/Shout! Factory	"Comic Relief 2006"	Broadcast/streaming/DVD
2009	"Just for Laughs"	JFL	Episode: "Whoopi Goldberg"	Broadcast/streaming
2010	"Lafflink's Platinum Comedy Series Vol. 4"	First Look Studios	Chapter: "Louis CK"	DVD/streaming
2013	"Best of Just for Laughs"	JFL	Episode: "Comedy Kings 5"	Broadcast/streaming
2017	"Just for Laughs – Comedy All-Stars, Vol. 4"	JFL	Tracks 1-3: Jfl 2009	CD/download/streaming
2018	"Just for Laughs – The Nasty Show, Vol. 3"	JFL	Track 10: Sexual Expression (Jfl 1994)	CD/download/streaming
2021	"Caroline's Comedy Hour, Vol. 1"	Clown Jewels	Track 7: Guy from the Thing	Download/streaming
2021	"Caroline's Comedy Hour, Vol. 5"	Clown Jewels	Track 18: Diverse Culture	Download/streaming
2021	"Caroline's Comedy Hour, Vol. 8"	Clown Jewels	Track 13: Do You Ever Feel Stupid?	Download/streaming

== Awards and nominations ==
For his work performing stand-up, writing, acting, directing, producing, and editing, C.K. has received several awards and nominations. Among them are 39 Emmy Award nominations, with six wins. C.K. has won the Grammy Award for Best Comedy Album three times—for Hilarious in 2012, Live at Madison Square Garden in 2016, and Sincerely Louis C.K. in 2022.

C.K. has also been nominated for two Golden Globes and five Screen Actors Guild awards, winning the award for Outstanding Performance by a Cast in a Motion Picture in 2013, together with the other cast members of American Hustle.

Additionally, C.K. has won three Peabody Awards in the area of Excellence in Entertainment for his shows Louie, Better Things, and Horace and Pete, as well as three Writers Guild of America awards for his work on Louie, alongside his writing partner, Pamela Adlon.
