= Sorry (2021 film) =

2021 stand-up comedy special by Louis C.K.

- Release poster for the special
- Directed by: Louis C.K.
- Written by: Louis C.K.
- Produced by: Louis C.K.; Brady Nasfell
- Starring: Louis C.K.
- Cinematography: Christopher Raymond
- Edited by: Carlos Almonte
- Production companies: Circus King Films; Positive Image Video
- Distributed by: Louisck.com
- Release date: December 18, 2021
- Running time: 63 minutes
- Country: United States

Sorry is a 2021 stand-up comedy concert film by Louis C.K. The special was released on December 18, 2021 on C.K.'s website.

== Production ==
The show was shot in August 2021 at the Hulu Theater at Madison Square Garden.

== Release ==
The special was self-released by C.K. via his website, available for digital download or streaming for US$10. C.K. ran an advertisement for the special during a December broadcast for Saturday Night Live. C.K. has previously hosted SNL four times.

== Music ==
The special opens and closes with "Like a Rolling Stone" by Bob Dylan.

== Reception ==
=== Critical reception ===
Lili Loufbourow of Slate reviewed that Sorry "isn't bad" and rated a B+ or C− among C.K.'s works, but lacks ambition. Loufbourow said that C.K. is "repeating a lot of themes you'll recognize from other specials" and that the way his "flirtations with the offensive and the taboo work" are less successful in light of his sexual misconduct.

Reviewing a live performance of the show at the Hulu Theatre in August, The Daily Beast's Katie Tamola lambasted it as an "insultingly unapologetic hour of material from a man who thinks that if he fits enough passive self-deprecation into his comedy, he can get away with pretty much anything". Tamola criticized jokes C.K. made about receiving sexual interest from younger women, and men being afraid of being accused of raping children. Tamola found the use of the slur faggot "uncomfortable".

Matthew Mahler of MovieWeb reviewed the special saying "His last specials have been accused of pandering to the alt-right, what with his criticism of the victims of the Parkland shooting, his rants against gender pronouns, and his bitterness toward the 'woke generation.' However, Sorry does something slightly different and actually thought-provoking rather than intentionally shocking, and has some truly hilarious moments."

=== Analysis ===
According to some observers, the title ironically refers to allegations of sexual misconduct by C.K. that were made public in 2017. Academics in The Conversation wrote that C.K.'s statement in response to the incident lacked the word "sorry", so the special's title allowed "renewed criticism for a seemingly flippant treatment of the harm that he caused".

== Awards ==
C.K. was nominated for Best Comedy Album at the 65th Annual Grammy Awards, but lost to Dave Chappelle for his stand up special The Closer.
