= Live at the Comedy Store =

- Written by: Louis C.K.; Jay London (opening act)
- Directed by: Louis C.K.
- Starring: Louis C.K.
- Music by: Maxfield Gast; Matt Kilmer; Adam Platt; Mike Shobe; Benjamin Wright
- Country of origin: United States
- Original language: English

Production
- Producer: John Skidmore
- Cinematography: Paul Koestner
- Editor: Louis C.K.
- Running time: 66 minutes

Original release
- Release: January 27, 2015

Live at the Comedy Store is the sixth full-length comedy special performed by comedian Louis C.K. It premiered on his website as a $5 download on January 27, 2015 and was later shown on FX. The special was filmed in West Hollywood, California at the Comedy Store by C.K.'s own production company, Pig Newton, Inc.

The special was nominated for two Emmy awards, winning in the Outstanding Writing for a Variety Special category and nominated for Outstanding Variety Special.

C.K. re-released the DVD, video and audio album for download and streaming on his website in April 2020. The special also has been available to stream on Netflix since 2016.

== Track listing ==
No.	Title	Length
1.	"Intro"	3:10
2.	"The Mexican"	1:42
3.	"Vaginer"	2:57
4.	"Reallocated Noises"	3:40
5.	"First & Last Time Having Sex"	1:36
6.	"Subway Crazy Person"	1:56
7.	"Babies on a Plane"	5:45
8.	"Being a Good Dad"	4:19
9.	"Lying"	3:05
10.	"Trading Notes About Race"	3:05
11.	"13 & 9 Years Old"	5:28
12.	"Everybody Dies"	4:51
13.	"The Dog"	4:11
14.	"Bats"	7:15
15.	"Rat Sex"	4:50
16.	"Bad Girlfriend"	4:13
17.	"Wizard of Oz"	2:30
18.	"Outro"	0:56
Total length:		65:29

== Critical reception ==
The Daily Dot described the special as "a revolutionary slab of standup...masterful...pops". Paste magazine said, "This is a guy who cherishes every single night he has spent behind a microphone trying to coax laughs from people."
