= Hilarious (film) =

2010 television film

- Written by: Louis C.K.
- Directed by: Louis C.K.
- Starring: Louis C.K.
- Music by: Mark Rivers
- Country of origin: United States
- Original language: English

Production
- Producer: Louis C.K.
- Cinematography: Paul Koestner
- Editor: Louis C.K.
- Running time: 82 minutes

Original release
- Release: September 18, 2010

Hilarious

Live album by Louis C.K.
- Released: January 10, 2011
- Recorded: April 18, 2009
- Venues: Pabst Theater (Milwaukee, Wisconsin)
- Studio: Circus King Productions
- Genres: Comedy; spoken word
- Length: 1:19:22
- Label: Comedy Central Records
- Producers: Jack Vaughn Jr.; Michelle Caputo; Shannon Hartman

Louis C.K. chronology
Chewed Up (2008)	Hilarious (2011)	Live at the Beacon Theater (2011)

Hilarious is the fourth concert film and stand-up comedy album by American comedian and director Louis C.K. It was filmed and recorded at the Pabst Theater in Milwaukee.

The film was first screened at the 26th Sundance Film Festival on January 26, 2010, had a one-day theater screening in select cities on September 8, 2010, and was exhibited on the television network Epix on September 18, 2010. It was later shown on Comedy Central, and the album was released on January 11, 2011, via Comedy Central Records. C.K. re-released the video and audio album for download and streaming on his website in April 2020.

The film received two nominations at the 63rd Primetime Emmy Awards for Outstanding Picture Editing for a Special (Single or Multi-Camera) and Outstanding Writing for a Variety, Music or Comedy Special. The album peaked at number 77 on the Billboard 200 and won a Grammy Award for Best Comedy Album at the 54th Annual Grammy Awards.

== Background and development ==
After the airing of his second comedy special, Chewed Up, Louis C.K. launched his Hilarious tour in the fall of 2008, where he continued his trend of ditching all the material of his previous tour and began performing with a brand new set. The themes and subjects include C.K.'s life post-divorce, living with kids, and numerous accounts of social criticism, such as the now-famous "Everything's Amazing & Nobody's Happy" routine (featured on the album as "Cell Phones and Flying"). He had done that routine in conversation on the October 1, 2008 episode of Late Night with Conan O'Brien, which had resulted in a viral frenzy after it was posted to YouTube and other media outlets; it was seen more than 7 million times before it was blocked by copyright claims from NBCUniversal. In reference to the appearance and internet attention, Eric Spitznagel praised his honesty in Vanity Fair, saying:

Louis C.K. has slowly been evolving from a dependably funny stand-up to the comedy lovechild of Bill Hicks and George Carlin. [...] If you don't find yourself nodding along with C.K. in fierce agreement, and even occasionally pumping the air with a raised fist salute, you're either dead inside or a member of that "crappiest generation" C.K. was talking about. Somehow, Louis managed to do something even Obama has had a difficult time pulling off lately: Finding the silver lining of our nation's ongoing economic collapse. In less than five minutes, C.K. made a convincing case that capitalism's death knell might not be such a bad thing after all. Sure, it could mean donkeys will become our primary source of transportation, but it could also lead to the triumphant return of rotary phones and manual credit card machines.

While on his tour, C.K. also landed a deal with FX to shoot a pilot featuring a loosely autobiographical depiction of his life as a comedian living as a single dad in New York City. Soon after, the show was placed for an order of 13 episodes, requiring a new hour of material aside from the hour written for the Hilarious tour. He stated on the podcast WTF with Marc Maron that his 4th hour went into the show but was performed with the Hilarious material on the same tour.

=== Production ===
At the end of the tour, C.K. filmed the material as his third one-hour special at the Pabst Theater in Milwaukee during April 2009, with C.K. himself serving as director and editor. It was filmed as a concert special, and was screened in movie theaters in eight cities: namely, Austin, Boston, Chicago, Los Angeles, New York City, Philadelphia, San Francisco, and Washington, D.C. It was recorded by Jon D'Uva and Skeyelab Music, mixed by Jon D'Uva and mastered by Ian Stearns.

== Critical reception ==
Professional ratings
Review scores
Source	Rating
AllMusic	4/5 stars
Exclaim!	9/10
Pitchfork	7.8/10
Punknews.org	4.5/5 stars
Reel Film Reviews	3/4 stars
The A.V. Club	A−

Hilarious was praised by critics, with Punchline Magazine writing an extensive review on C.K.'s performance, saying: "From each new hour of C.K. material, we've come to expect an emotionally rich, soul-baring performance; Hilarious gives us exactly that.... In the end, Hilarious will be remembered as one of the strongest stand-up comedy performances in the history of the art".

== Track listing ==
All tracks are written by Louis Székely.

No.	Title	Length
1.	"Intro / Dead People"	2:28
2.	"Being Single Again"	7:06
3.	"Hot Girls in Bars and Their Dude Counterparts"	4:42
4.	"Dumb Thoughts"	8:22
5.	"Currency"	5:42
6.	"Cell Phones and Flying"	11:24
7.	"The Way We Talk (Hilarious)"	8:50
8.	"Other People's Kids"	8:17
9.	"My 7-Year-Old Is Better Than Me"	6:22
10.	"My 3-Year-Old Is a 3-Year-Old"	10:41
11.	"Taking Sexual Inventory"	5:28
Total length:		1:19:22

== Charts ==
Chart (2011)	Peak position
US Billboard 200	77
US Top Comedy Albums (Billboard)	1
US Independent Albums (Billboard)	10
