= Oh My God (2013 film) =

- Directed by: Louis C.K.
- Written by: Louis C.K.
- Produced by: Louis C.K.
- Starring: Louis C.K.
- Cinematography: Paul Koestner
- Edited by: Louis C.K.
- Release date: April 13, 2013
- Running time: 58 minutes
- Country: United States
- Language: English

Oh My God is the fifth full-length comedy special performed by comedian Louis C.K. It premiered on HBO on April 13, 2013. The special was filmed in Phoenix, Arizona at the Celebrity Theatre.

The special was nominated for four Emmy awards, winning in the Outstanding Writing for a Variety Special category.

C.K. re-released the DVD, video and audio album for download and streaming on his website in April 2020.

== Track listing ==
No.	Title	Length
1.	"Intro"	1:11
2.	"The Old Lady And The Dog"	2:58
3.	"My Daughter Likes Fish"	2:46
4.	"The Food Chain"	3:57
5.	"Courtyard Confrontation"	4:09
6.	"Getting What 'Old' Is"	4:21
7.	"Putting On Socks"	1:59
8.	"If You're Older You're Smarter"	4:06
9.	"Getting Older Makes My Life Better"	2:25
10.	"Everybody Has Their Time"	1:27
11.	"Dating Takes Courage"	2:37
12.	"First Date"	1:19
13.	"Tits"	5:30
14.	"Divorce"	2:03
15.	"Videoing Your Kids"	2:38
16.	"Life Is A Good Deal"	2:45
17.	"Behind The Wheel"	2:39
18.	"If Murder Was Legal"	3:24
19.	"Of Course, But Maybe"	4:20
20.	"Outro"	0:56
Total length:		57:30

== Critical reception ==
The special received generally positive critical reviews. Kyle Ryan, writing for The A.V. Club, said: "To put it succinctly: Louis C.K. seems unstoppable right now. And Oh My God only reinforces that perception." Robert Lloyd, reviewer from the Los Angeles Times, said: "His HBO show starts slow, but his views of mortality are more funny and his fixation on 'horrible thoughts' still more so. Still, it's no 'Louie.'"

The special holds a 90 on Metacritic, based on 5 reviews.
