= Live at the Beacon Theater =

- Cover Art
- Directed by: Louis C.K.
- Written by: Louis C.K.
- Produced by: Louis C.K.
- Starring: Louis C.K.
- Cinematography: Paul Koestner
- Edited by: Louis C.K.
- Music by: Sweetpro
- Release date: December 10, 2011
- Running time: 62 minutes
- Country: United States
- Language: English
- Budget: $170,000
- Box office: $1,000,000 (as of December 17, 2011)

Live at the Beacon Theater is the fourth full-length comedy special/concert film by comedian Louis C.K. The special takes place at the Beacon Theatre in Manhattan, New York.

In contrast to his previous specials, which had been produced for broadcast and sale on physical media, Live at the Beacon Theater is sold directly from the comedian's website for the cost of $5.00 USD and can be downloaded in 720p HD or streamed in browser. Also in contrast to his previous special, Hilarious, which was released for sale more than a year and a half after it was recorded, Live at the Beacon captures a performance from just a month before its release (November 10, 2011). It later aired on the FX television channel. It later was made available in a Humble Bundle.

As stated in the end credits, the film was dedicated to comedian Patrice O'Neal, who died two weeks prior to its release. C.K. considered O'Neal one of his favorite comedians.

The film won the Primetime Emmy Award for Outstanding Writing for a Variety, Music, or Comedy Special and received three other nominations.

C.K. re-released the DVD, video and audio album for download and streaming on his website in April 2020.

== Production ==
C.K.'s production/distribution company for Live at the Beacon Theater is Pig Newton. The company name is a reference to an argument Louis had with his youngest daughter over the proper term for Fig Newtons.

== Reception ==
Reviews have largely been positive, with most describing the special as of comparably high quality to C.K.'s previous work. Much of the media attention, however, has focused on his decision to forgo not only physical media, but third-party digital distribution channels like Hulu and Netflix, as well as his decision to forgo DRM on the video file. Instead, C.K. included a letter emphasizing the direct relationship between the artist and consumer in the hopes that this would more effectively deter piracy.

CK considered the experiment a success, later saying he covered the $250,000 costs of the film and website within 12 hours of its release, and that he had grossed $550,000 as of the time of his statement. Although the film was made available by pirates shortly after release, C.K. believes that the rate of piracy was low due to the low cost of the product, convenient delivery, and the lack of a middle man profiting from its sales. In an interview with Bill Simmons two days later, he said that his gross had increased to $800,000. On December 21, 2011, C.K. appeared on Late Night with Jimmy Fallon where he provided an extensive recounting of the special: C.K. said that 220,000 people had bought the show, providing a gross of $1.1 million. With the proceeds, C.K. said that he reimbursed his company $250,000 for production costs, gave $250,000 in bonuses to those who work for him, donated $280,000 to a mix of charities, and joked he would use the remaining $220,000 to buy himself a new penis ("I'm keeping the old one...I'm gonna have an old one and a new one, right there. It's gonna be nice.").

The success of the special prompted other comedians, including Jim Gaffigan, Bill Burr and Aziz Ansari, to release their own specials with a similar business model.

== Track listing ==
No.	Title	Length
1.	"Intro"	2:12
2.	"Let's Get Started"	2:16
3.	"What To Do When You're Dead"	4:46
4.	"Sexual Perversion in America"	1:49
5.	"Weird Baby"	1:13
6.	"Soldier on a Plane"	3:31
7.	"Nice Guy in an Elevator"	1:32
8.	"Rental Car"	3:24
9.	"Candy Wrapper"	1:46
10.	"White People"	5:20
11.	"Clifford the Big Red Dog"	2:42
12.	"Board Games"	2:19
13.	"I Hate This One Kid"	10:10
14.	"Memories"	3:20
15.	"Too Old for Drugs"	8:09
16.	"Constant Sexual Thoughts"	6:12
17.	"Outro"	1:43
