= Shameless (Louis C.K. special) =

- Directed by: Steven J. Santos
- Written by: Louis C.K.
- Produced by: Leo Clarke; Dave Becky (executive); Louis C.K. (executive); Vic Kaplan (executive); Ralph Paredes (executive)
- Starring: Louis C.K.
- Edited by: Brian Schnuckel
- Release date: January 13, 2007
- Running time: 56 minutes
- Country: United States
- Language: English

Shameless is the first full-length comedy special performed by comedian Louis C.K. It premiered on HBO January 13, 2007. The special was filmed in Los Angeles, California at the Henry Fonda Theater on November 4, 2006.

The DVD of the special was released on June 26, 2007 and C.K. re-released the audio-only version of the album on his website for download in 2020.

== Track listing ==
No.	Title	Length
1.	"Intro"	0:32
2.	"Tell Your Girlfriend I Said "Thanks""	1:35
3.	"Waiting for the Bathroom"	0:27
4.	"Duck Vaginas"	1:52
5.	"Time Machine"	3:00
6.	"Picking People To Hate"	6:32
7.	"Suck A Bag Of Dicks"	8:40
8.	"Ewan McGregor"	1:19
9.	"Fat Guy Problems"	5:47
10.	"Comparing Notes"	3:53
11.	"Saddest Thing In America"	7:48
12.	"The Kids Do You In"	8:16
13.	"Alone in the House"	1:55
14.	"Single People"	1:33
15.	"Outro"	0:56
Total length:		54:05

== Critical reception ==
The Guardian website said "Fifteen years of hard work and evolution have created an apparently effortless honesty that is fluent and heartfelt. Louis CK is the voice of resignation."
