= List of Louie episodes =

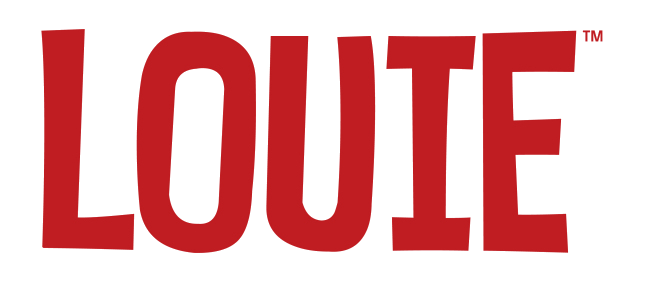

Louie is an American comedy-drama television series created, written, directed by, and starring stand-up comedian Louis C.K. The series premiered on FX on June 29, 2010 and ended on May 28, 2015, with a total of 61 episodes over the course of 5 seasons.

== Series overview ==
Season	Episodes	Originally released	
Season	Episodes	First released	Last released
1	13	June 29, 2010	September 7, 2010
2	13	June 23, 2011	September 8, 2011
3	13	June 28, 2012	September 27, 2012
4	14	May 5, 2014	June 16, 2014
5	8	April 9, 2015	May 28, 2015

== Episodes ==
=== Season 1 (2010) ===
No. overall	No. in season	Title	Directed by	Written by	Original release date	Prod. code	U.S. viewers (millions)
1	1	"Pilot"	Louis C.K.	Louis C.K.	June 29, 2010	XCK01001	1.11
2	2	"Poker/Divorce"	Louis C.K.	Louis C.K.	June 29, 2010	XCK01004	1.11
3	3	"Dr. Ben/Nick"	Louis C.K.	Louis C.K.	July 6, 2010	XCK01002	0.72
4	4	"So Old/Playdate"	Louis C.K.	Louis C.K.	July 13, 2010	XCK01003	0.63
5	5	"Travel Day/South"	Louis C.K.	Louis C.K.	July 20, 2010	XCK01007	0.68
6	6	"Heckler/Cop Movie"	Louis C.K.	Louis C.K.	July 27, 2010	XCK01006	0.82
7	7	"Double Date/Mom"	Louis C.K.	Louis C.K.	August 3, 2010	XCK01008	0.58
8	8	"Dogpound"	Louis C.K.	Louis C.K.	August 10, 2010	XCK01009	0.78
9	9	"Bully"	Louis C.K.	Louis C.K.	August 17, 2010	XCK01005	0.58
10	10	"Dentist/Tarese"	Louis C.K.	Louis C.K.	August 24, 2010	XCK01010	0.58
11	11	"God"	Louis C.K.	Louis C.K.	August 31, 2010	XCK01011	0.76
12	12	"Gym"	Louis C.K.	Louis C.K.	September 7, 2010	XCK01012	1.32
13	13	"Night Out"	Louis C.K.	Louis C.K.	September 7, 2010	XCK01013	0.84

=== Season 2 (2011) ===
No. overall	No. in season	Title	Directed by	Written by	Original release date	Prod. code	U.S. viewers (millions)
14	1	"Pregnant"	Louis C.K.	Louis C.K.	June 23, 2011	XCK02005	1.57
15	2	"Bummer/Blueberries"	Louis C.K.	Story by : Louis C.K. & Pamela Adlon; Teleplay by : Louis C.K.	June 30, 2011	XCK02006	1.28
16	3	"Moving"	Louis C.K.	Louis C.K.	July 7, 2011	XCK02001	0.95
17	4	"Joan"	Louis C.K.	Louis C.K.	July 14, 2011	XCK02002	1.12
18	5	"Country Drive"	Louis C.K.	Louis C.K.	July 21, 2011	XCK02007	0.87
19	6	"Subway/Pamela"	Louis C.K.	Louis C.K.	July 28, 2011	XCK02008	1.02
20	7	"Oh, Louie/Tickets"	Louis C.K.	Louis C.K.	August 4, 2011	XCK02009	0.93
21	8	"Come On, God"	Louis C.K.	Louis C.K.	August 11, 2011	XCK02003	0.73
22	9	"Eddie"	Louis C.K.	Louis C.K.	August 11, 2011	XCK02010	0.64
23	10	"Halloween/Ellie"	Louis C.K.	Louis C.K.	August 18, 2011	XCK02004	0.73
24	11	"Duckling"	Louis C.K.	Louis C.K.	August 25, 2011	XCKR2012	0.81
25	12	"Niece"	Louis C.K.	Louis C.K.	September 1, 2011	XCK02011	0.98
26	13	"New Jersey/Airport"	Louis C.K.	Louis C.K.	September 8, 2011	XCK02014	0.57

=== Season 3 (2012) ===
No. overall	No. in season	Title	Directed by	Written by	Original release date	Prod. code	U.S. viewers (millions)
27	1	"Something Is Wrong"	Louis C.K.	Louis C.K.	June 28, 2012	XCK03001	1.43
28	2	"Telling Jokes/Set Up"	Louis C.K.	Louis C.K.	July 5, 2012	XCK03002	1.08
29	3	"Miami"	Louis C.K.	Louis C.K.	July 12, 2012	XCK03003	1.06
30	4	"Daddy's Girlfriend Part 1"	Louis C.K.	Story by : Louis C.K. & Pamela Adlon; Teleplay by : Louis C.K.	July 19, 2012	XCK03004	0.96
31	5	"Daddy's Girlfriend Part 2"	Louis C.K.	Louis C.K.	July 26, 2012	XCK03005	0.82
32	6	"Barney/Never"	Louis C.K.	Louis C.K.	August 2, 2012	XCK03006	0.69
33	7	"Ikea/Piano Lesson"	Louis C.K.	Story by : Louis C.K. & Pamela Adlon; Teleplay by : Louis C.K.	August 9, 2012	XCK03007	0.70
34	8	"Dad"	Louis C.K.	Louis C.K.	August 16, 2012	XCK03008	0.84
35	9	"Looking for Liz/Lilly Changes"	Louis C.K.	Louis C.K.	August 23, 2012	XCK03009	0.71
36	10	"Late Show Part 1"	Louis C.K.	Louis C.K.	August 30, 2012	XCK03010	0.60
37	11	"Late Show Part 2"	Louis C.K.	Louis C.K.	September 13, 2012	XCK03011	0.48
38	12	"Late Show Part 3"	Louis C.K.	Louis C.K.	September 20, 2012	XCK03012	0.54
39	13	"New Year's Eve"	Louis C.K.	Louis C.K.	September 27, 2012	XCK03013	0.43

=== Season 4 (2014) ===
No. overall	No. in season	Title	Directed by	Written by	Original release date	Prod. code	U.S. viewers (millions)
40	1	"Back"	Louis C.K.	Louis C.K.	May 5, 2014	XCK04001	0.94
41	2	"Model"	Louis C.K.	Louis C.K.	May 5, 2014	XCK04002	0.91
42	3	"So Did the Fat Lady"	Louis C.K.	Louis C.K.	May 12, 2014	XCK04003	0.81
43	4	"Elevator Part 1"	Louis C.K.	Louis C.K.	May 12, 2014	XCK04004	0.68
44	5	"Elevator Part 2"	Louis C.K.	Louis C.K.	May 19, 2014	XCK04005	0.60
45	6	"Elevator Part 3"	Louis C.K.	Louis C.K.	May 19, 2014	XCK04006	0.57
46	7	"Elevator Part 4"	Louis C.K.	Louis C.K.	May 26, 2014	XCK04007	0.51
47	8	"Elevator Part 5"	Louis C.K.	Louis C.K.	May 26, 2014	XCK04008	0.44
48	9	"Elevator Part 6"	Louis C.K.	Louis C.K.	June 2, 2014	XCK04009	0.61
49	10	"Pamela Part 1"	Louis C.K.	Louis C.K.	June 2, 2014	XCK04010	0.71
50 51	11 12	"In the Woods"	Louis C.K.	Louis C.K.	June 9, 2014	XCK04011 XCK04012	0.60
52	13	"Pamela Part 2"	Louis C.K.	Louis C.K. & Pamela Adlon	June 16, 2014	XCK04013	0.60
53	14	"Pamela Part 3"	Louis C.K.	Louis C.K. & Pamela Adlon	June 16, 2014	XCK04014	0.56

=== Season 5 (2015) ===
No. overall	No. in season	Title	Directed by	Written by	Original release date	Prod. code	U.S. viewers (millions)
54	1	"Pot Luck"	Louis C.K.	Louis C.K.	April 9, 2015	XCK05001	0.63
55	2	"A La Carte"	Louis C.K.	Story by : Louis C.K. & Pamela Adlon; Teleplay by : Louis C.K.	April 16, 2015	XCK05002	0.47
56	3	"Cop Story"	Louis C.K.	Story by : Louis C.K & Robert Smigel; Teleplay by : Louis C.K.	April 23, 2015	XCK05003	0.41
57	4	"Bobby's House"	Louis C.K.	Louis C.K.	April 30, 2015	XCK05004	0.58
58	5	"Untitled"	Louis C.K.	Louis C.K.	May 7, 2015	XCK05005	0.37
59	6	"Sleepover"	Louis C.K.	Story by : Louis C.K. & Pamela Adlon; Teleplay by : Louis C.K.	May 14, 2015	XCK05006	0.41
60	7	"The Road Part 1"	Louis C.K.	Louis C.K.	May 21, 2015	XCK05007	0.44
61	8	"The Road Part 2"	Louis C.K.	Story by : Louis C.K. & Steven Wright; Teleplay by : Louis C.K.	May 28, 2015	XCK05008	0.51
