= List of awards and nominations received by Louie =

Awards and nominations received by Louie
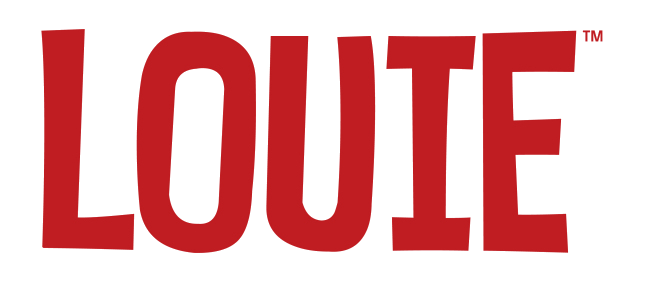
Awards and nominations
Award	Won	Nominated
American Film Institute Awards	2	2
Emmy Awards	3	22
Critics' Choice Television Awards	2	10
Directors Guild of America Awards	0	3
Golden Globe Awards	0	2
Peabody Awards	1	1
Producers Guild of America Awards	0	2
Robert Prizes	0	1
Satellite Awards	1	4
Screen Actors Guild Awards	0	3
Television Critics Association Awards	4	8
Writers Guild of America Awards	3	4
- Total number of wins and nominations
Totals	16	62
- Footnotes

Louie is an American television comedy created, written, directed by, and starring stand-up comedian Louis C.K. The series has aired for five seasons on the cable channel FX since June 29, 2010. The show centers on a fictionalized version of C.K.'s life as a comedian, father, and divorcé.

Since its debut, the series has earned widespread critical acclaim and has been nominated for a variety of different awards, including twenty-two Primetime Emmy Awards (three wins for the series), eight Television Critics Association Awards (three wins), two Golden Globe Awards, four Writers Guild of America Awards (three wins), three Directors Guild of America Award, two Screen Actors Guild Awards, and two Producers Guild of America Awards.

C.K. has been nominated for nineteen individual awards for his role as the series lead, seven as director, nine as writer, and thirteen as producer. Several of C.K.'s collaborators have also been nominated for various awards including series producers M. Blair Breard, Tony Hernandez, Dave Becky, Vernon Chatman, and Steven Wright, frequent co-writer and recurring guest star Pamela Adlon, and guest actors Melissa Leo, David Lynch, and Sarah Baker. As of 2016, Louie has won 16 awards from a total of 62 nominations.

== Emmy Awards ==
Awarded since 1949, the Primetime Emmy Award is an annual accolade bestowed by members of the Academy of Television Arts & Sciences recognizing outstanding achievements in American prime time television programming. Awards presented for more technical and production-based categories (like art direction, casting, and editing) are designated "Creative Arts Emmy Awards." As of 2016, Louie has won three awards from a total of twenty-two nominations.

=== Primetime Emmy Awards ===
List of Primetime Emmy Awards and nominations received by Louie
Year	Category	Nominee(s)	Episode	Result	Ref.
2011	Outstanding Lead Actor in a Comedy Series	Louis C.K.	"Bully"	Nominated	
2011	Outstanding Writing for a Comedy Series	Louis C.K.	"Poker/Divorce"	Nominated	
2012	Outstanding Directing for a Comedy Series	Louis C.K.	"Duckling"	Nominated	
2012	Outstanding Lead Actor in a Comedy Series	Louis C.K.	"Duckling"	Nominated	
2012	Outstanding Writing for a Comedy Series	Louis C.K.	"Pregnant"	Won	
2013	Outstanding Comedy Series	Louis C.K., M. Blair Breard, Tony Hernandez, Dave Becky, Vernon Chatman		Nominated	
2013	Outstanding Directing for a Comedy Series	Louis C.K.	"New Year's Eve"	Nominated	
2013	Outstanding Lead Actor in a Comedy Series	Louis C.K.	"Daddy's Girlfriend, Part 1"	Nominated	
2013	Outstanding Writing for a Comedy Series	Louis C.K. and Pamela Adlon	"Daddy's Girlfriend (Part 1)"	Nominated	
2014	Outstanding Comedy Series	Louis C.K., M. Blair Breard, Dave Becky, Adam Escott, Pamela Adlon, Vernon Chatman, Steven Wright		Nominated	
2014	Outstanding Directing for a Comedy Series	Louis C.K.	"Elevator, Part 6"	Nominated	
2014	Outstanding Lead Actor in a Comedy Series	Louis C.K.	"Model"	Nominated	
2014	Outstanding Writing for a Comedy Series	Louis C.K.	"So Did the Fat Lady"	Won	
2015	Outstanding Comedy Series	Louis C.K., M. Blair Breard, Dave Becky, Adam Escott, Pamela Adlon, Vernon Chatman, Steven Wright, John Skidmore		Nominated	
2015	Outstanding Directing for a Comedy Series	Louis C.K.	"Sleepover"	Nominated	
2015	Outstanding Lead Actor in a Comedy Series	Louis C.K.	"Bobby's House"	Nominated	
2015	Outstanding Writing for a Comedy Series	Louis C.K.	"Bobby's House"	Nominated	

=== Primetime Creative Arts Emmy Awards ===
List of Creative Arts Emmy Awards and nominations received by Louie
Year	Category	Nominee(s)	Episode	Result	Ref.
2013	Outstanding Guest Actress in a Comedy Series	Melissa Leo	"Telling Jokes/Set Up"	Won	
2013	Outstanding Single-Camera Picture Editing for a Comedy Series	Susan E. Morse	"Daddy's Girlfriend (Part 2)"	Nominated	
2014	Outstanding Casting for a Comedy Series	Gayle Keller		Nominated	
2015	Outstanding Casting for a Comedy Series	Gayle Keller		Nominated	
2015	Outstanding Guest Actress in a Comedy Series	Pamela Adlon	"Bobby's House"	Nominated	

== Critics' Choice Television Awards ==
The Critics' Choice Television Award is an annual accolade bestowed by the Broadcast Television Journalists Association in recognition of outstanding achievements in television, since 2011. As of 2016, Louie has won two awards from a total of ten nominations.

List of Critics' Choice Television Awards and nominations received by Louie
Year	Category	Nominee(s)	Result	Ref.
2011	Best Actor in a Comedy Series	Louis C.K.	Nominated	
2011	Best Comedy Series		Nominated	
2012	Best Actor in a Comedy Series	Louis C.K.	Won	
2013	Best Actor in a Comedy Series	Louis C.K.	Won	
2013	Best Comedy Series		Nominated	
2013	Best Guest Performer in a Comedy Series	Melissa Leo	Nominated	
2013	Best Guest Performer in a Comedy Series	David Lynch	Nominated	
2014	Best Actor in a Comedy Series	Louis C.K.	Nominated	
2014	Best Comedy Series		Nominated	
2014	Best Guest Performer in a Comedy Series	Sarah Baker	Nominated	

== Directors Guild of America Awards ==
The Directors Guild of America Award is an annual accolade bestowed by the Directors Guild of America in recognition of outstanding achievements in film and television directing, since 1938. As of 2016, Louie has been nominated for three awards.

List of Directors Guild of America Awards and nominations received by Louie
Year	Category	Nominee(s)	Episode	Result	Ref.
2013	Outstanding Directing – Comedy Series	Louis C.K.	"New Year's Eve"	Nominated	
2015	Outstanding Directing – Comedy Series	Louis C.K.	"Elevator: Part 6"	Nominated	
2016	Outstanding Directing – Comedy Series	Louis C.K.	"Sleepover"	Nominated	

== Golden Globe Awards ==
The Golden Globe Award is an annual accolade bestowed by members of the Hollywood Foreign Press Association recognizing outstanding achievements in film and television, since 1944. As of 2016, Louie has been nominated for two awards.

List of Golden Globe Awards and nominations received by Louie
Year	Category	Nominee(s)	Result	Ref.
2013	Best Actor – Television Series Musical or Comedy	Louis C.K.	Nominated	
2015	Best Actor – Television Series Musical or Comedy	Louis C.K.	Nominated	

== Producers Guild of America Awards ==
The Producers Guild of America Award is an annual accolade bestowed by the Producers Guild of America in recognition of outstanding achievements in film and television producing, since 1990. As of 2016, Louie has been nominated for two awards.

List of Producers Guild of America Awards and nominations received by Louie
Year	Category	Nominee(s)	Result	Ref.
2013	Episodic Television Series – Comedy	Dave Becky, M. Blair Breard, Louis C.K.	Nominated	
2015	Episodic Television Series – Comedy	Pamela Adlon, Dave Becky, M. Blair Breard, Louis C.K., Vernon Chatman, Adam Escott, Steven Wright	Nominated	

== Satellite Awards ==
The Satellite Award is an annual accolade bestowed by members of the International Press Academy recognizing outstanding achievements in film and television. As of 2016, Louie has won one award from a total of four nominations.

List of Satellite Awards and nominations received by Louie
Year	Category	Nominee(s)	Result	Ref.
2011	Best Actor – Television Series Musical or Comedy	Louis C.K.	Won	
2011	Best Television Series – Musical or Comedy		Nominated	
2012	Best Actor – Television Series Musical or Comedy	Louis C.K.	Nominated	
2015	Best Actor – Television Series Musical or Comedy	Louis C.K.	Nominated	

== Screen Actors Guild Awards ==
Awarded since 1995, the Screen Actors Guild Award is an annual accolade bestowed by members of SAG-AFTRA recognizing outstanding achievements in acting in television. As of 2016, Louie has been nominated for three awards.

List of Screen Actors Guild Awards and nominations received by Louie
Year	Category	Nominee(s)	Result	Ref.
2013	Outstanding Performance by a Male Actor in a Comedy Series	Louis C.K.	Nominated	
2015	Outstanding Performance by a Male Actor in a Comedy Series	Louis C.K.	Nominated	
2016	Outstanding Performance by a Male Actor in a Comedy Series	Louis C.K.	Nominated	

== Television Critics Association Awards ==
The TCA Award is an annual accolade bestowed by the Television Critics Association in recognition of outstanding achievements in television. As of 2016, Louie has won four awards from a total of eight nominations.

List of TCA Awards and nominations received by Louie
Year	Category	Nominee(s)	Result	Ref.
2011	Individual Achievement in Comedy	Louis C.K.	Nominated	
2011	Outstanding Achievement in Comedy	Louis C.K.	Nominated	
2012	Individual Achievement in Comedy	Louis C.K.	Won	
2012	Outstanding Achievement in Comedy	Louis C.K.	Won	
2013	Individual Achievement in Comedy	Louis C.K.	Won	
2013	Outstanding Achievement in Comedy	Louis C.K.	Nominated	
2014	Individual Achievement in Comedy	Louis C.K.	Nominated	
2014	Outstanding Achievement in Comedy	Louis C.K.	Won	

== Writers Guild of America Awards ==
The Writers Guild of America Award is an annual accolade bestowed by the Writers Guild of America in recognition of outstanding achievements in film, television, and radio, since 1949. As of 2016, Louie has won three awards from a total of four nominations.

List of Writers Guild of America Awards and nominations received by Louie
Year	Category	Nominee(s)	Episode	Result	Ref.
2012	Best Comedy Series	Pamela Adlon, Louis C.K.		Nominated	
2013	Best Comedy Series	Pamela Adlon, Vernon Chatman, Louis C.K.		Won	
2015	Best Comedy Series	Louis C.K.		Won	
2015	Best Episodic Comedy	Louis C.K.	"So Did the Fat Lady"	Won	

== Other awards ==
List of all other awards and nominations received by Louie
Year	Award	Category	Nominee(s)	Result	Ref.
2011	American Film Institute Award	AFI TV Program of the Year		Won	
2012	American Film Institute Award	AFI TV Program of the Year		Won	
2013	Peabody Award	Area of Excellence	Louis C.K.	Won	
2013	Robert Prize	Best Foreign Television Series		Nominated	
