= Looking for Liz/Lilly Changes =

- Louie episode
- Episode no.: Season 3 Episode 9
- Directed by: Louis C.K.
- Written by: Louis C.K.
- Cinematography by: Paul Koestner
- Editing by: Louis C.K.; Susan E. Morse
- Production code: XCK03009
- Original release date: August 23, 2012
- Running time: 21 minutes

Guest appearances
- Chloë Sevigny as Jeanie; Parker Posey as Liz; Hadley Delany as Lilly; Ursula Parker as Jane; Roderick Hill as Peter; Yul Vazquez as Pedro

Episode chronology
| ← Previous "Dad" | Next → "Late Show" |
- Louie (season 3)

"Looking for Liz/Lilly Changes" is the ninth episode of the third season of the American comedy-drama television series Louie. It is the 35th overall episode of the series and was written and directed by Louis C.K., who also serves as the lead actor. It was released on FX on August 23, 2012.

The series follows Louie, a fictionalized version of C.K., a comedian and newly divorced father raising his two daughters in New York City. In the episode, Louie tries to find Liz again, and also experiences problems with Lilly's changing mood.

According to Nielsen Media Research, the episode was seen by an estimated 0.71 million household viewers and gained a 0.4 ratings share among adults aged 18–49. The episode received extremely positive reviews, who praised the second segment, but criticizing the first segment.

== Plot ==
Louie (Louis C.K.) starts dreaming about Liz (Parker Posey), his previous date. He decides to visit the bookstore, but is disappointed to discover that she quit and no one has information about where she lives or works now. Her replacement, Jeanie (Chloë Sevigny), is moved by Louie's obvious love for Liz and decides to help him out. After failing to find information from the database, she decides to take him to where he remembers Liz's apartment was. However, he doesn't know her exact address, and Jeanie's clumsy attempt to get the information from the doorman completely fails. When Louie proclaims that he has to give up on his quest, Jeanie masturbates publicly in a bar and then leaves Louie, telling him that she is married and not to come back to the bookstore.

While picking up the girls, Louie sees Lilly (Hadley Delany) being bullied, but she refuses to talk about it. Lilly experiences a change in her mood due to growing pains and even misbehaves towards Louie. Later, Louie realizes that she left his apartment without permission. After failing to find her through the building, he calls the police. The police suggest calling Janet, so as Louie prepares to tell her, Lilly appears in the house, having been reading in the closet. The police leave, and although upset, Louie is relieved that she is there. She apologizes for her behavior, and Louie states that it is fine.

== Production ==
=== Development ===
In July 2012, FX confirmed that the ninth episode of the season would be titled "Looking for Liz/Lilly Changes", and that it would be written and directed by series creator and lead actor Louis C.K. This was C.K.'s 35th writing and directing credit.

== Reception ==
=== Viewers ===
In its original American broadcast, "Looking for Liz/Lilly Changes" was seen by an estimated 0.71 million household viewers with a 0.4 in the 18-49 demographics. This means that 0.4 percent of all households with televisions watched the episode. This was a 16% decrease in viewership from the previous episode, which was watched by 0.84 million viewers with a 0.4 in the 18-49 demographics.

=== Critical reviews ===
"Looking for Liz/Lilly Changes" received extremely positive reviews from critics. Eric Goldman of IGN gave the episode a "great" 8.5 out of 10 and wrote, "It's really interesting to see Louie delve so much further into serialization this season. We got actual follow-up on Louie's date with Liz this week, which was very cool to see. That episode and her character were so impactful, and it's good to see that resonating with Louie onscreen."

Nathan Rabin of The A.V. Club gave the episode a "B+" grade and wrote, "I'm tired of reading about Manic Pixie Dream Girls and I coined the fucking phrase but it's damn near impossible to write about the latest episode of Louie without mentioning the seemingly ubiquitous archetype. That's because 'Looking For Liz', the first half of the episode, is essentially a meta-meditation on the Manic Pixie Dream Girl that finds a new, somehow even more disturbed Manic Pixie Dream Girl helping Louie look for an earlier Manic Pixie Dream Girl."

Alan Sepinwall of HitFix wrote, "Louie has always taken an agnostic approach to continuity. The show doesn't completely ignore it but is willing to ignore continuity whenever it proves inconvenient. This has been a surprisingly continuity-heavy season, however, with tonight providing a sequel of sorts to Louie's long, strange, memorable date with Liz. But where I thought the date episode was one of the show's best ever, 'Looking for Liz' was this season's first major disappointment." Zach Dionne of Vulture wrote, "None of Louie and his new friend Chloë Sevigny's attempts to find Liz go according to romantic expectations, either. Plans go awry. Life seems shorter than you want it to. You come to terms with things not being meant to be, or not meant to be the way you wanted them to be. Louie, however, forces you to come to terms with another thing."

Paste gave the episode a 7.5 out of 10 and wrote, "For once I'd be happy to have two ratings to give an episode of Louie, because I disliked the first half almost as much as I loved the second. I have a bit less respect for the early short than I do for many of the show's less successful segments because usually they're at least trying something new, while here we had something that treaded water and, taken the rest of the show as a whole, is almost mildly offensive." Neal Lynch of TV Fanatic gave the episode a 4 star out of 5 rating and wrote, "I mentioned this in my review of last week's Louie: the show's storyline and sequencing felt like a dream. Like a less convoluted comedic twist on Inception. Though there were plenty of surreal aspects to it, we couldn't fully bring ourselves to believe that the events weren't happening in real life. We just figured it was Louie's interpretation of what's happening. Well, that theme continued on 'Looking for Liz; Lilly Changes,' with Louie laying out how most of the episode would unfold during his stand up routine."
