= Louie season 3 =

Louie
- Season 3
- DVD cover
- Starring: Louis C.K.
- No. of episodes: 13

Release
- Original network: FX
- Original release: June 28 – September 27, 2012

Season chronology
- ← Previous; Season 2 Next → Season 4

The third season of the American television comedy series Louie premiered on June 28, 2012 and concluded on September 27, 2012. It consisted of thirteen episodes, each running approximately 23 minutes in length. FX broadcast the third season on Thursdays at 10:30 pm in the United States. The season was produced by 3 Arts Entertainment and the executive producers were Louis C.K., Dave Becky and M. Blair Breard.

Louie was created, written and directed by Louis C.K., who stars as a fictionalized version of himself, a comedian and newly divorced father raising his two daughters in New York City. The show has a loose format atypical for television comedy series, consisting of largely unconnected storylines and segments (described as "extended vignettes") that revolve around Louie's life, punctuated by live stand-up performances.

The season received critical acclaim.

== Cast ==
=== Main cast ===
- Louis C.K. as Louie

=== Recurring cast ===
- Hadley Delany as Lilly (7 episodes)
- Ursula Parker as Jane (7 episodes)
- Susan Kelechi Watson as Janet (5 episodes)
- Edward Gelbinovich as Doug (4 episodes)
- Parker Posey as Liz (4 episodes)
- Maria Bamford as Maria (2 episodes)
- Nick DiPaolo as Nick (2 episodes)
- Jay Leno as Jay (2 episodes)
- David Lynch as Jack Dall (2 episodes)
- Garry Marshall as Lars Tardigan (2 episodes)
- Jim Norton as Jim (2 episodes)
- Chris Rock as Chris (2 episodes)
- Sarah Silverman as Sarah (2 episodes)

=== Guest stars ===
- Maria Dizzia as Delores ("Ikea/Piano Lesson")
- Gaby Hoffmann as April ("Something Is Wrong")
- F. Murray Abraham as Uncle Excelsior ("Dad")
- Melissa Leo as Laurie Brent ("Telling Jokes/Set Up")
- Amy Poehler as Debbie ("New Year's Eve")
- Marc Maron as Marc ("Ikea/Piano Lesson")
- Paul Rudd as Paul ("Late Show Part 3")
- Susan Sarandon as Susan ("Late Show Part 3")
- Jerry Seinfeld as Jerry ("Late Show Part 3")
- Chloë Sevigny as Jeanie ("Looking for Liz/Lilly Changes")
- J. B. Smoove as Gravedigger ("Barney/Never")
- Robin Williams as Robin ("Barney/Never")

== Episodes ==
No. overall	No. in season	Title	Directed by	Written by	Original release date	Prod. code	U.S. viewers (millions)
27	1	"Something Is Wrong"	Louis C.K.	Louis C.K.	June 28, 2012	XCK03001	1.43
Louie begins his day by parking in a confusing area. Then in short order, his girlfriend (Gaby Hoffmann) reads his body language and insists they stop dating, his car is off-handedly destroyed by a city repair crew, he impulsively buys a $7500 motorcycle which he then crashes, he completely annoys his ex-wife (Susan Kelechi Watson), makes his ex-girlfriend completely determined to not end up in an endless empty relationship with him. At the outset, Louie also reflects on the blurring of his penis.
28	2	"Telling Jokes/Set Up"	Louis C.K.	Louis C.K.	July 5, 2012	XCK03002	1.08
The episode begins with Louie exchanging a few jokes with his two daughters around the dinner table. Then it skips to him telling a joke about his daughters' jokes at a local night club. Following that, he is invited to dinner by a comedian friend (Allan Havey) and his wife. He shows up to learn that he has been set up with a woman named Laurie (Melissa Leo). They don't get along well at first but end up leaving to get a drink at the end of dinner. At the bar they get along quite well until a sexual encounter afterwards leads to rape due to a difference in values. They decide to go out again.
29	3	"Miami"	Louis C.K.	Louis C.K.	July 12, 2012	XCK03003	1.06
Louie travels to Miami to perform comedy shows. While swimming, Louie is rescued by a lifeguard named Ramon who thinks he is drowning. Louie and Ramon quickly develop a friendship, where Ramon shows Louie around the city, and the two often hang out. Louie prolongs his trip to spend more time with Ramon. After telling this to Ramon, their friendship becomes somewhat awkward, so they decide to part ways.
30	4	"Daddy's Girlfriend Part 1"	Louis C.K.	Story by : Louis C.K. & Pamela Adlon; Teleplay by : Louis C.K.	July 19, 2012	XCK03004	0.96
Louie's daughters ask Louie why he doesn't have a girlfriend. Louie begins looking for potential mates that might make a positive impression on his daughters. He approaches comedian Maria Bamford and finds her receptive to sex, but uninterested in meeting his kids. He meets a woman (Parker Posey), a bookstore employee who makes an insightful recommendation for Lilly. Louie returns to the bookstore and asks the bookstore employee on a date, which she accepts.
31	5	"Daddy's Girlfriend Part 2"	Louis C.K.	Louis C.K.	July 26, 2012	XCK03005	0.82
On his date with the bookstore employee, Louie learns that she had carcinoma when she was 14, but fully recovered and dropped out of school. She takes Louie to a bar but is refused shots by the bartender, who reminds her of problems she had on a previous visit. Instead she takes Louie to a store where she talks him into trying on a glittery dress. They eat at Russ & Daughters and then help a delusional homeless man before their date ends, with the couple viewing the city from the rooftop of a skyscraper. What should be a sweet moment turns into a phobia test for Louie as she asks him to dangle at the roof's edge. As he panics and asks her to come away from the edge, she extols the beauty of the situation and why she isn't afraid, and, for a fleeting moment, Louie sees in her something extraordinary, but then the woman's mood changes and she asks to go home and, with the final words of the episode, she reveals her name to be Liz.
32	6	"Barney/Never"	Louis C.K.	Louis C.K.	August 2, 2012	XCK03006	0.69
After attending a funeral for a comedy club manager, where only Louie and Robin Williams attend, they later meet up and discuss how horrible a person he was. They then visit a local strip club that the manager had often tried to get people to go to with him and find some people who are devastated to learn of his death. Big Jay Oakerson appears as the house emcee. In the second segment, Louie is forced to look after his mentally challenged school-parent acquaintance Nancy's creepy son, Never. While doing so, he also goes on a radio show via phone to help boost ticket sales for a comedy show he is doing in Kansas City. Gregg "Opie" Hughes, Anthony Cumia, Jim Norton and Amy Schumer guest star as the Kansas City radio hosts. Other guest stars include Artie Lange as a gasoline truck driver and J. B. Smoove as a gravedigger in the end credits.
33	7	"Ikea/Piano Lesson"	Louis C.K.	Story by : Louis C.K. & Pamela Adlon; Teleplay by : Louis C.K.	August 9, 2012	XCK03007	0.70
Delores (Maria Dizzia) confronts Louie at their children's school and asks him to go to therapy with her to discuss their previous sexual encounter, Louie declines and instead agrees to go shopping at IKEA with her for items for her home. In the second segment, Louie has his first piano lesson, but is interrupted by a phone call from Maria Bamford who tells him she has crabs, which means that he probably has them as well. He then rushes to the pharmacy to get shampoo for it. Louie calls Sarah Silverman after seeing her on a comedy special on TV of comedy acts from the 1980's. While reminiscing, Louie remembers a conflict he had with Marc Maron, and discovers it was all his own fault. Louie then goes to apologize to Marc, but Marc tells him he already apologized to him in the exact same manner five years ago.
34	8	"Dad"	Louis C.K.	Louis C.K.	August 16, 2012	XCK03008	0.84
Louie is invited to lunch by his uncle Excelsior (F. Murray Abraham), who badgers him to visit his estranged father in Boston. This suggestion troubles Louie so much that he begins vomiting and develops a rash, so he goes to Boston to confront the situation. Delirious with stress, he reaches his father's house, but then flees dramatically, using a BRP Can-Am Spyder Roadster and a cigarette boat to make his escape.
35	9	"Looking for Liz/Lilly Changes"	Louis C.K.	Louis C.K.	August 23, 2012	XCK03009	0.71
"Looking for Liz": Louie still longs for Liz, whose one night with him changed his life. He returns to the bookstore where she worked to find she has been replaced — by a woman with even more quirks (Chloë Sevigny). She realizes his quest to find Liz (or true love). When Louie's interest in finding Liz or love fades, his guide masturbates in public then parts company with him, adding that she is married. "Lilly Changes": Louie goes to pick up his daughters from school. He sees Lilly being bullied by other girls and attempts to cheer her up through various means. She is experiencing growing pains and remains morose. All three find their separate spots at home and Louie later learns Lilly is missing. She is found reading in a closet, after Louie has panicked and involved the police. She apologizes for being moody, leaving Louie pondering the mysteries that are young girls.
36	10	"Late Show Part 1"	Louis C.K.	Louis C.K.	August 30, 2012	XCK03010	0.60
Louie is forced to be the main guest on The Tonight Show with Jay Leno when Tom Cruise doesn't show up. The next morning, Louie learns from his manager that his set from the show went viral and that he is to have a meeting with the president of CBS. During the meeting, Louie's asked if he's interested in replacing David Letterman as the new host of the late show. However, the CBS chief (Garry Marshall) lets Louie know that he's a backup plan to hedge against the high salary specs for preferred new host Jerry Seinfeld, and lays out all the ways Louie's career is on its downswing and how he's a longshot in this quest for the brass ring.
37	11	"Late Show Part 2"	Louis C.K.	Louis C.K.	September 13, 2012	XCK03011	0.48
Unsure whether to take the late show gig or not, Louie takes advice from several people. His ex-wife Janet tells him to go for it, so he can finally be successful and be a good role model for his daughters. Jay Leno tells Louie not to take the job, but Chris Rock tells him he should. Louie meets with Jack Dall (David Lynch) to help him prepare, including the timing of telling jokes and how he should improve his image. Dall sends Louie to a boxing arena to help get in better shape. Back at home, while resting and watching TV, Louie watches an entertainment news report that breaks the news of Letterman retiring, and that his friend Chris Rock is also in consideration for the job.
38	12	"Late Show Part 3"	Louis C.K.	Louis C.K.	September 20, 2012	XCK03012	0.54
Louie continues his efforts to earn the Late Show hosting job. He is visibly moved by his daughters' support for his goal, but continues to be confounded by Jack Dall, who gives Louie a "make me laugh right now" ultimatum he barely passes and then has him do a practice interview with an emotional cleaning woman. Louie makes it to an actual test show in front of a packed audience, where Jack wishes him well and gives him some advice that pays off when Jerry Seinfeld tells Louie he's already signed a deal to take over for David Letterman and Louie would be nice to keep it a secret. Louie recognizes Jerry is lying and goes out and absolutely crushes his test show, mixing genial humor with some raunchier material and hilarious interviews with Susan Sarandon and Paul Rudd. Lars Tardigan loves the footage and says "We've got an option!" That night, Louie gathers with his comedian friends for the news, but Doug shows up looking downcast just as Maria Menounos announces that David Letterman re-upped for another 10 years and has even worse news: Louie is now persona non grata forever with Letterman. A devastated Louie barely avoids breaking down, but he also appreciates that he at least cost Letterman a ton of money on his new contract, lets the Letterman show know that they never broke him, and returns to Alphonse's gym to continue his boxing education.
39	13	"New Year's Eve"	Louis C.K.	Louis C.K.	September 27, 2012	XCK03013	0.43
Louie is with his daughters on Christmas Day who are unwrapping their presents, while Louie remembers the trouble he went through to wrap them all up. He then reads them a story about a duck named Ping who lived on the Yangtze River. Later they leave with their mother and new step-father. Louie gets a phone call from his sister (Amy Poehler) inviting him to spend time with her in Mexico. Louie then has a dream about the girls in their 20s, discussing how alone he is, convincing him to go to Mexico. On the bus to the airport he reunites with Liz who immediately collapses and is taken to the hospital where she dies. Louie ultimately decides at the airport to fly to China after remembering the story about Ping and ends up spending New Year with a random Chinese family.

== Reception ==
=== Reviews ===
The third season of Louie received universal acclaim reviews from critics, receiving a Metacritic score of 94 out of 100, based on 16 reviews. Verne Gay of Newsday named it "One of TV's best shows, comedy or drama, because this series often succeeds as both." Matt Zoller Seitz of Vulture called it "bizarre, inventive, and bold" and Rob Owen of the Pittsburgh Post-Gazette said "the series remains smart and thought-provoking but it's also quite funny." On Rotten Tomatoes, the season has an approval rating of 100% with an average score of 9.2 out of 10 based on 22 reviews. The website's critical consensus reads, "Louie continues its evolution as a show that deftly – and bravely – juggles comedy, philosophy, and raunch."

=== Awards and nominations ===
Louis C.K. and Pamela Adlon won for Best Television Comedy series for the 65th Writers Guild of America Awards. C.K. was nominated for both the Golden Globe Award for Best Actor – Television Series Musical or Comedy and the Screen Actors Guild Award for Outstanding Performance by a Male Actor in a Comedy Series, for the 70th Golden Globe Awards and the 19th Screen Actors Guild Awards, respectively. The series was also included as one of the Top Television Programs of the Year by the American Film Institute and won a 2013 Peabody Award. For the 65th Primetime Emmy Awards, the series received nominations for Outstanding Comedy Series; C.K. was nominated for Outstanding Lead Actor in a Comedy Series, Outstanding Writing for a Comedy Series ("Daddy's Girlfriend Part 1"), and Outstanding Directing for a Comedy Series ("New Year's Eve"); Susan E. Morse was nominated for Outstanding Single-Camera Picture Editing for a Comedy Series ("Daddy's Girlfriend Part 2"); and Melissa Leo won for Outstanding Guest Actress in a Comedy Series. At the 29th TCA Awards, C.K. won for Individual Achievement in Comedy and the series was nominated for Outstanding Achievement in Comedy.
