= Daddy's Girlfriend =

- Louie episodes
- Episode nos.: Season 3 Episodes 4 & 5
- Directed by: Louis C.K.
- Written by: Louis C.K.
- Story by: Pamela Adlon (Part 1)
- Cinematography by: Paul Koestner
- Editing by: Susan E. Morse
- Production codes: XCK03004 & XCK03005
- Original release dates: July 19, 2012 (Part 1); July 26, 2012 (Part 2)
- Running time: 44 minutes

Guest appearances
- Part 1: Parker Posey as Liz; Maria Bamford as Herself; Hadley Delany as Lilly; Ursula Parker as Jane; Part 2: Parker Posey as Liz; Casey Siemaszko as Homeless Man

Episode chronology
← Previous "Miami"	Next → "Barney/Never"
- Louie (season 3)

"Daddy's Girlfriend" is the fourth and fifth episodes of the third season of the American comedy-drama television series Louie. They are the 30th and 31st overall episode of the series and were written and directed by Louis C.K., who also serves as the lead actor, with Pamela Adlon getting a story credit for "Part 1". They were released on FX, with "Part 1" airing on July 19, 2012, and "Part 2" airing on July 26, 2012.

The series follows Louie, a fictionalized version of C.K., a comedian and newly divorced father raising his two daughters in New York City. In the episodes, Louie tries to find a girlfriend following a discussion with his children, so he decides to ask a bookstore employee on a date.

According to Nielsen Media Research, "Part 1" was seen by an estimated 0.96 million household viewers and gained a 0.5 ratings share among adults aged 18–49, while "Part 2" was seen by an estimated 0.82 million household viewers and gained a 0.4 ratings share among adults aged 18–49. The episodes received critical acclaim, with critics praising the writing, performances and emotional tone. At the 65th Primetime Emmy Awards, "Part 1" received nominations for Outstanding Writing for a Comedy Series and Outstanding Lead Actor in a Comedy Series.

== Plot ==
=== Part 1 ===
While dining with Lilly (Hadley Delany) and Jane (Ursula Parker), Louie (Louis C.K.) is asked why he doesn't have a girlfriend. This prompts him to try to find a woman. He asks fellow comedian Maria Bamford to go out with him, and they have sex. However, Louie decides she might not be the one as she is not interested in spending time with his kids.

Louie tries to get interested into some of the school's teachers, but it does not work. He goes to a bookstore, where he meets an employee (Parker Posey). She gives him a book for Lily, so Louie keeps visiting her, with both enjoying each other's company. Louie decides to ask her out, and is delighted when she accepts.

=== Part 2 ===
Louie and the employee go out to a bar. However, when the employee asks for alcohol, she is told that she cannot do it since an incident some time ago, prompting her to leave. As they walk in the streets, the employee opens up about being diagnosed with carcinoma when she was 14 years old, and miraculously surviving. When Louie asks her name, she jokingly refers to herself as "Tape Recorder".

She takes Louie to a store, convincing him to try on a glittery dress, making her laugh. They then go eating at Russ & Daughters, as well as helping a homeless man on their way out. She also convinces him in sneaking into a building and go upstairs, eventually reaching the rooftop of a skyscraper. She sits on the edge of the rooftop, inviting Louie to join her, who declines. She tells him that he won't fall, as the only way to do it is if he wants to jump. This impresses Louie, although she eventually decides to leave the edge and asks to go home. As they leave, she finally reveals her name, Liz. Louie stares at the rooftop for a moment before closing the door.

== Production ==
=== Development ===
In June 2012, FX confirmed that the fourth and fifth episodes of the season would be titled "Daddy's Girlfriend", and that it would be written and directed by series creator and lead actor Louis C.K., with Pamela Adlon getting a story credit for "Part 1". This was C.K.'s 30th and 31st writing and directing credit, and Adlon's second writing credit.

== Reception ==
=== Viewers ===
==== Part 1 ====
In its original American broadcast, "Daddy's Girlfriend Part 1" was seen by an estimated 0.96 million household viewers with a 0.5 in the 18-49 demographics. This means that 0.5 percent of all households with televisions watched the episode. This was a 10% decrease in viewership from the previous episode, which was watched by 1.06 million viewers with a 0.5 in the 18-49 demographics.

==== Part 2 ====
In its original American broadcast, "Daddy's Girlfriend Part 2" was seen by an estimated 0.82 million household viewers with a 0.4 in the 18-49 demographics. This means that 0.4 percent of all households with televisions watched the episode. This was a 15% decrease in viewership from the previous episode, which was watched by 0.96 million viewers with a 0.5 in the 18-49 demographics.

=== Critical reviews ===
==== Part 1 ====
"Daddy's Girlfriend Part 1" received mostly positive reviews from critics. Eric Goldman of IGN gave the episode a "great" 8.5 out of 10 and wrote, "Let's cross our fingers for Louie next week, when this story continues... Though I know better to hold my breath for this to work in the long-term."

Nathan Rabin of The A.V. Club gave the episode an "A–" grade and wrote, "'Daddy's Girlfriend (Pt. 1)' ends on a note of hope and optimism as C.K. pulls back his arm in celebration of scoring a date with a cute, interesting flibbertigibbet, but in this context holding out hope for a new relationship is a way of ensuring that inevitable disappointments will be even more soul-crushing. Pray for Louie. The fictional world he inhabits can be as cruel to his alter ego as the real world is currently kind to the man who created him."

Zach Dionne of Vulture wrote, "It's a joy to see the rarity that is Louie succeeding, even if temporarily. Still, seated not far behind my smile at Louie's triumph was the familiar dread this show trains its viewers to feel: I would love for this go well, and there is no way this will go well."

Paste gave the episode a 7.1 out of 10 and wrote, "'Daddy's Girlfriend Part 1' is pleasant, well-directed and competently acted, but that's fairly damning praise for a show that can frequently be counted on for doing something truly new and great." Neal Lynch of TV Fanatic gave the episode a 4 star out of 5 rating and wrote, "On 'Daddy's Girflriend (Part 1)', Louie took his foot off the gas pedal a bit. Right off the bat, we knew this episode would deal with prejudice, but we weren't sure how far Louie was going to take it. Would it be racial, cultural or otherwise controversial? Though not as hard-hitting or cringe-inducing as previous episodes, this prejudice was just as noteworthy."

==== Part 2 ====
"Daddy's Girlfriend Part 2" received critical acclaim. Eric Goldman of IGN gave the episode an "amazing" 9 out of 10 and wrote, "I love that Louie can do episodes like this. In the early days of this series, an episode like 'Daddy's Girlfriend Part 2' may have felt out of place, but now Louie has established there is no 'out of place.' There are just the fascinating stories Louis C.K. chooses to tell week to week."

Nathan Rabin of The A.V. Club gave the episode an "A–" grade and wrote, "For Posey, life doesn't mean anything unless it's teetering on the precipice of death. Posey's character may be mentally ill and self-destructive, but there will always be a dark seductiveness to dancing madly on the edge, especially opposite someone so inveterately adorable."

Alan Sepinwall of HitFix wrote, "My favorite episode of the season to date, and one of the best of the series. Just beautiful." Zach Dionne of Vulture wrote, "Like season one's grim, contemplative 'God' and season two's equally dark, possibly more ruminative 'Eddie', this'll be an installment our thoughts inevitably turn to when we think of Louie, if not Louis C.K. as an entity altogether. He's a comedian first and foremost, but it's hard shaking the notion that walking straight-faced through discomforting themes are as satisfying to C.K. as artfully wrought dick jokes."

Paste gave the episode an 8.8 out of 10 and wrote, "If it took a so-so episode for Louie to get to this far more fertile ground, then it was well worth the detour." Neal Lynch of TV Fanatic gave the episode a 3 star out of 5 rating and wrote, "Louie went through the black and white (the bad memories) but, much like Eternal Sunshine of the Spotless Mind, he will ultimately remember her positively."

=== Accolades ===
At the 65th Primetime Emmy Awards, Louis C.K. and Pamela Adlon were nominated for Outstanding Writing for a Comedy Series for "Part 1", while C.K. also submitted the episode to support his Outstanding Lead Actor in a Comedy Series nomination. It would lose the former to 30 Rock for the episode "Last Lunch", and the latter to Jim Parsons for The Big Bang Theory.
