= Telling Jokes/Set Up =

- Louie episode
- Episode no.: Season 3 Episode 2
- Directed by: Louis C.K.
- Written by: Louis C.K.
- Cinematography by: Paul Koestner
- Editing by: Susan E. Morse
- Production code: XCK03002
- Original release date: July 5, 2012
- Running time: 22 minutes

Guest appearances
- Melissa Leo as Laurie; Allan Havey as Himself; Hadley Delany as Lilly; Ursula Parker as Jane

Episode chronology
← Previous "Something Is Wrong"	Next → "Miami"
- Louie (season 3)

"Telling Jokes/Set Up" is the second episode of the third season of the American comedy-drama television series Louie. It is the 28th overall episode of the series and was written and directed by Louis C.K., who also serves as the lead actor. It was released on FX on July 5, 2012.

The series follows Louie, a fictionalized version of C.K., a comedian and newly divorced father raising his two daughters in New York City. In the episode, Louie joins a friend for dinner, where he is introduced to a woman as a potential date.

According to Nielsen Media Research, the episode was seen by an estimated 1.08 million household viewers and gained a 0.6 ratings share among adults aged 18–49. The episode received critical acclaim, with Melissa Leo receiving praise for her guest appearance. For her performance, Melissa Leo won Outstanding Guest Actress in a Comedy Series at the 65th Primetime Creative Arts Emmy Awards.

== Plot ==
While eating, Louie (Louis C.K.) exchanges knock knock jokes with Lilly (Hadley Delany) and Jane (Ursula Parker). He uses part of their exchange during his stand-up routine.

Louie hangs out with his friend, comedian Allan Havey, when he is invited to join him and his wife Debbie (Larisa Polonsky) to dine. After picking up alcohol, he arrives at their house, discovering that they also invited a friend, Laurie (Melissa Leo). Debbie wanted to set up Louie with Debbie, with Allan not disclosing it to him as he knew Louie wouldn't come. They have an awkward dinner, in which they don't get along very well. As Allan and Debbie have an argument, Laurie invites Louie to join her in the bar, which he accepts.

At the bar, they hit it off, with Laurie admitting it was the most fun time she had in a while. She then drives Louie in her car, before pulling off and performing oral sex on him. She then asks for cunnilingus, which Louie claims he is not comfortable with. She then threatens him to break his finger if she does not do it, as well as licking her butthole, forcing Louie to do it. Despite being forced, Louie agrees to go on another date with her.

== Production ==
=== Development ===
In June 2012, FX confirmed that the second episode of the season would be titled "Telling Jokes/Set Up", and that it would be written and directed by series creator and lead actor Louis C.K. This was C.K.'s 28th writing and directing credit.

=== Casting ===
Melissa Leo met Louis C.K. during an appearance at the Primetime Emmy Awards ceremony, where he offered her the role. She accepted, saying "I got what he was doing, and if he thought I could be her and do that with him — yeah, I'm willing to give it a try."

== Reception ==
=== Viewers ===
In its original American broadcast, "Telling Jokes/Set Up" was seen by an estimated 1.08 million household viewers with a 0.6 in the 18-49 demographics. This means that 0.6 percent of all households with televisions watched the episode. This was a 25% decrease in viewership from the previous episode, which was watched by 1.43 million viewers with a 0.7 in the 18-49 demographics.

=== Critical reviews ===
"Telling Jokes/Set Up" received positive reviews from critics. Eric Goldman of IGN gave the episode a "great" 8.5 out of 10 and wrote, "Damn if Louis C.K. doesn't know how to tap into that weird place others wouldn't think of going for humor. 'Lick it! Lick it!', indeed. This is a show not afraid to go to very uncomfortable and even twisted places, and I continue to admire it for that."

Emily St. James of The A.V. Club gave the episode an "A" grade and wrote, "'Telling Jokes/Set Up' wouldn’t work without Melissa Leo in its central guest role, and she gives the kind of performance that would deserve guest Emmy awards if I thought the Emmys would notice the show at all in that category."

Alan Sepinwall of HitFix wrote, "Louis C.K. has said that he writes Louie stories without a particular length in mind, and just lets them run for as long as he feels they deserve it. And once that's done, he figures out how he's going to fit them into an episode – or, in the case of a few of this season’s stories, into multiple episodes. So I'm assuming that 'Telling Jokes' and 'Set Up' largely wound up together because their respective running times add up to a normal episode. But they also feel linked by a theme that's going to pop up often in ensuing episodes: simple yet unexpected pleasures." Roger Cormier of Vulture wrote, "'Telling Jokes' and 'Set Up' are two entirely different stories, and C.K. has repeatedly insisted that he only considers what segments to put together in an episode if they magically combine to make 21 minutes of television, but come on - all jokes have set ups. It can't be a coincidence. Right?"

Paste gave the episode an 8.8 out of 10 and wrote, "There's a certain surrealism in this sort of juxtaposition that doesn't detract from the semi-cinema verite feel of the whole show. Everything in it always still feels real, like something Louis C.K. just recorded moments out of his life rather than carefully juxtaposing elements. It's just that the reality he finds himself in is itself a surreal landscape." Neal Lynch of TV Fanatic gave the episode a 4.1 star out of 5 rating and wrote, "I don't think it's reached that point, but my knee jerk reaction has been, 'what a jip' so far in Season 3. Once I've had some time to fully absorb and digest, I kick myself for doubting its approach. As long as Louie continues to deliver those few unexpected moments, the show should plod on tragically satisfying."

=== Accolades ===
For the episode, Melissa Leo won Outstanding Guest Actress in a Comedy Series at the 65th Primetime Creative Arts Emmy Awards.
