= Late Show (Louie) =

- Louie episodes
- Episode nos.: Season 3 Episodes 10, 11 & 12
- Directed by: Louis C.K.
- Written by: Louis C.K.
- Cinematography by: Paul Koestner
- Editing by: Louis C.K.
- Production codes: XCK03010; XCK03011; XCK03012
- Original release dates: August 30, 2012 (Part 1); September 13, 2012 (Part 2); September 20, 2012 (Part 3)
- Running time: 64 minutes

Guest appearances
- Part 1: Jay Leno as Himself; Garry Marshall as Lars Tardigan; Edward Gelbinovich as Doug; Part 2: David Lynch as Jack Dall; Jay Leno as Himself; Chris Rock as Himself; Edward Gelbinovich as Doug; Susan Kelechi Watson as Janet; Isiah Whitlock Jr. as Alphonse; Hadley Delany as Lilly; Ursula Parker as Jane; Part 3: David Lynch as Jack Dall; Garry Marshall as Lars Tardigan; Jerry Seinfeld as Himself; Edward Gelbinovich as Doug; Susan Kelechi Watson as Janet; Isiah Whitlock Jr. as Alphonse; Hadley Delany as Lilly; Ursula Parker as Jane; Paul Rudd as Himself; Susan Sarandon as Herself

Episode chronology
← Previous "Looking for Liz/Lilly Changes"	Next → "New Year's Eve"
- Louie (season 3)

"Late Show" is the tenth, eleventh and twelfth episodes of the third season of the American comedy-drama television series Louie. They are the 36th through 38th overall episode of the series and were written and directed by Louis C.K., who also serves as the lead actor. They were released on FX, with "Part 1" airing on August 30, 2012, "Part 2" airing on September 13, 2012, and "Part 3" airing on September 20, 2012.

The series follows Louie, a fictionalized version of C.K., a comedian and newly divorced father raising his two daughters in New York City. In the episodes, Louie gets an offer to host a late show after a recent comedy set goes viral.

According to Nielsen Media Research, "Part 1" was seen by an estimated 0.60 million household viewers and gained a 0.3 ratings share among adults aged 18–49, "Part 2" was seen by an estimated 0.48 million household viewers and gained a 0.2 ratings share among adults aged 18–49, and "Part 3" was seen by an estimated 0.54 million household viewers and gained a 0.3 ratings share among adults aged 18–49. The episodes received critical acclaim, praised for its writing, direction, and performances (particularly for guest actor David Lynch).

== Plot ==
=== Part 1 ===
Louie (Louis C.K.) appears as a guest on The Tonight Show with Jay Leno, replacing Tom Cruise after he cancelled his appearance. The next morning, his manager Doug (Edward Gelbinovich) informs him that his comedy set went viral, and that CBS wants to meet him in an hour. A reluctant Louie leaves his hotel room.

The Chairman of CBS, Lars Tardigan (Garry Marshall), privately informs Louie that David Letterman is retiring from his late show. Impressed by Louie's comedy set, he asks him if he wants to be his successor. Louie declines, although Tardigan states that the offer is actually going to Jerry Seinfeld, with Louie serving as a backup. He also explains that Louie might be a cheaper option, also reiterating that Louie's career peaked and that this might be his shot at a long-term investment. He offers him going back to New York City and meet with his right-hand man, Jack Dall, to get him in shape, and they will try a test show in two months. If the test show is successful, CBS will pick it up.

=== Part 2 ===
Back in New York City, Louie breaks the non-disclosure agreement by telling Janet (Susan Kelechi Watson) about the offer. Janet feels that he only told her so she would dissuade him from taking it. She tells him that he should take it, so their children can look up to him as a role model for his success. He visits the Ed Sullivan Theater to meet with Dall (David Lynch), but makes a poor impression when it takes him over a minute to read from a cue card.

Louie starts doubting the offer. Jay Leno suggests he shouldn't take it, while Chris Rock tells him to ignore Leno. After another poor impression during rehearsal, Dall gets him to visit a gym the following day to get in shape. Louie visits the gym, where he fights in the boxing arena, but is easily beaten. Back home, Louie watches television, finding a news report about Letterman's possible retirement, and discovering that Chris Rock is also in consideration for the job.

=== Part 3 ===
Louie feels even more inspired in working out for the job. He once again meets with Dall, who makes him try to say anything funny. He also conducts a rehearsal interview with a worker, which causes the woman to cry and unimpress Dall. However, after a motivating talk with his children, Louie decides to work even more.

Before the test show, Louie is visited by Jerry Seinfeld. Seinfeld explains that he just signed a contract to officially take over hosting duties, and wanted to inform Louie about it. He leaves, asking him to keep it a secret. However, Louie recalls Dall's advice that if someone asks to keep a secret, the person is lying. Motivated, Louie performs the test show, managing to work through his timing and delivery. He interviews Susan Sarandon and Paul Rudd, and his show is well received, impressing Tardigan. At a bar, Louie sees a news report that reveals that Letterman had just signed a new contract extending his tenure to ten years. He realizes that the test show was actually just a scheme to get Letterman to reduce his salary, and Letterman is so angry with Louie that he is now a persona non grata on his show. He leaves the bar and stares at the Ed Sullivan Theater. He lifts his arms and yells "I did it!" before leaving happily. He returns to the gym, more motivated in working out.

== Production ==
=== Development ===
In August 2012, FX confirmed that the tenth, eleventh and twelfth episodes of the season would be titled "Late Show", and that it would be written and directed by series creator and lead actor Louis C.K. This was C.K.'s 36th, 37th, and 38th writing and directing credit.

=== Casting ===
The character of Jack Dall was originally conceived for Ben Gazzara, but the actor died by the time the crew tried to contact him. The role was then offered to Jerry Lewis, Woody Allen and Martin Scorsese, but all declined. C.K. then considered directors, deciding that David Lynch would be suitable for the role, saying "That would be really weird. It doesn't make any sense. It makes no sense." Lynch liked the script, but didn't feel he was the right person for the role. C.K. convinced him in accepting, affirming the character wouldn't exist if Lynch didn't accept.

== Reception ==
=== Viewers ===
==== Part 1 ====
In its original American broadcast, "Late Show Part 1" was seen by an estimated 0.60 million household viewers with a 0.3 in the 18-49 demographics. This means that 0.3 percent of all households with televisions watched the episode. This was a 16% decrease in viewership from the previous episode, which was watched by 0.71 million viewers with a 0.4 in the 18-49 demographics.

==== Part 2 ====
In its original American broadcast, "Late Show Part 2" was seen by an estimated 0.48 million household viewers with a 0.2 in the 18-49 demographics. This means that 0.2 percent of all households with televisions watched the episode. This was a 16% decrease in viewership from the previous episode, which was watched by 0.60 million viewers with a 0.3 in the 18-49 demographics.

==== Part 3 ====
In its original American broadcast, "Late Show Part 3" was seen by an estimated 0.54 million household viewers with a 0.3 in the 18-49 demographics. This means that 0.3 percent of all households with televisions watched the episode. This was a 16% decrease in viewership from the previous episode, which was watched by 0.48 million viewers with a 0.2 in the 18-49 demographics.

=== Critical reviews ===
==== Part 1 ====
"Late Show Part 1" received extremely positive reviews. Eric Goldman of IGN gave the episode an "amazing" 9 out of 10 and wrote, "This episode was another great mixture of comedy and drama – almost evenly split, in that the first half had some of the funniest material of the season, while the second half (Well, he final scene, really) got really, really intense."

Nathan Rabin of The A.V. Club gave the episode a "B+" grade and wrote, "'Late Show (Part 1)' is fundamentally concerned with the dark side of success, with the seamy, shadowy underbelly of exceeding expectations, both internal and external. Throughout the episode, Louie does far better than he could have possibly anticipated and is forced to wrestle with the unexpected consequences."

Alan Sepinwall of HitFix wrote, "Louis C.K.'s approach to continuity allows him to have his cake and eat it with a storyline like the one set up in the first part of this 'Late Show' trilogy. On the one hand, he gets to play off of what we know about the more modest state of TV Louie's career, and he gets to continue one story over multiple episodes. On the other hand, because we know that he can drop an idea at any moment, this story doesn’t automatically have to end with Louie blowing it and losing the job to Jerry Seinfeld." Zach Dionne of Vulture wrote, "Strap in, folks. We're heading into Louie's first-ever three-part episode and then an hour-long season closer. This is the show's final run at making a big mark in 2012 — the kind of impression that could help re-up all those Best Comedy of the Year accolades and Most Original Thing on TV superlatives. This last leg began solidly with the type of installment typically reserved for those series that embrace things like continuity and extended plots: the setup episode."

Paste gave the episode an 8.8 out of 10 and wrote, "This is really where the heart of Louie lies, so it's great to watch the show really push at the complex relationship between Louis and show business, emphasis on business." Neal Lynch of TV Fanatic gave the episode a 4 star out of 5 rating and wrote, "It's kind of amazing this show is only 22 minutes. It has the look and feel and power of an hour long serial. Of course, as an audience we choose to buy into seeing Part 2, but we know Louie's hosting gig isn't in the cards. If we see him do and be better, doesn't that mean he loses his appeal?"

==== Part 2 ====
"Late Show Part 2" received critical acclaim. Eric Goldman of IGN gave the episode an "amazing" 9.5 out of 10 and wrote, "Twin Peaks is one of my favorite TV series of all time, so I was delighted to see David Lynch of all people not only show up on Louie, but play a very Gordon Cole-like character. The entire episode seemed influenced by Lynch's offbeat style and rhythm, especially in Lynch's scenes. Hearing him talk about the importance of timing, while throwing in some incredibly awkward pauses, was just awesome, as were his incredibly outdated sample monologue jokes. The surreal closing credits sequence only added to the Lynch flavor."

Nathan Rabin of The A.V. Club gave the episode a "B+" grade and wrote, "Like 'Late Show (Part 1),' this is a strangely melancholy, even dour episode largely devoid of laughs but rich in sadness, awkward pauses, and free-floating anxiety. Louie and its creator are confident and secure enough to forgo laughs and jokes in favor of a larger, more ambitious, and more meticulously observed creative vision, the full scope of which will only become apparent next week when this fascinating, gloriously bittersweet three-episode arc concludes."

Alan Sepinwall of HitFix wrote, "Given where this episode went, it’s hard to imagine Louie having a plausible shot at the job in the conclusion of this trilogy, but it's been a pleasure to watch (and listen to, as I love the melancholy music used on the score) so far." Zach Dionne of Vulture wrote, "Some reactions to these first two parts of the 'Late Show' three-parter have been middling. It's clear C.K. is aiming for something different — bigger? — and tonally distinctive here. It's a focused, extended meditation on showbiz and success and being a family man in the face of it. Pending next week's resolution, I'm ready to vote the arc as one of Louie's best experiments thus far."

Paste gave the episode a 9 out of 10 and wrote, "'Late Show Part 2' has the difficult task of being the middle episode of a storyline, without really a beginning or ending, but this works well given Louie's fragmentary nature. It's one of those episodes of the show where everything works, and while by no means filled with laughs, is more importantly stuffed with well-executed ideas." Neal Lynch of TV Fanatic gave the episode a 4 star out of 5 rating and wrote, "The journey should be fun (and painful) to watch. He's been physically, emotionally and psychologically abused, but now it's for something big. All the bruises (ego and physical) are not without reason. But, as I've said in past reviews, we've come to know what to expect (failure) but we're just tuning in to see the fallout."

==== Part 3 ====
"Late Show Part 3" received critical acclaim. Eric Goldman of IGN gave the episode an "amazing" 9 out of 10 and wrote, "The conclusion of Louie's journey towards potentially becoming a late night host ended in Late Show Part 3, and while it didn't quite offer as many new turns as the last couple of episodes, it still was incredibly entertaining."

Emily St. James of The A.V. Club gave the episode an "A" grade and wrote, "This is definitely a case where the three episodes as a whole make up a story that's much greater than the sum of its parts, a case where the particular story Louis C.K. is trying to tell is so inextricably bound together that I almost wish FX had found a way to air all three parts on the same night. I found the first two parts to be very funny and occasionally moving, but part three brought everything together in a way that made the whole thing rather undeniable."

Alan Sepinwall of HitFix wrote, "Wow. 'Daddy's Girlfriend' aside, this season of Louie has been more interesting than dazzling, but the conclusion of this 'Late Show' trilogy earned every second the show had spent building up to it. Just an incredibly powerful, funny, heartbreaking, inspiring episode." Zach Dionne of Vulture wrote, "The contemplative do-or-die music revs into a horn-blasting triumph theme, Louie walks off into the sunset of Times Square, and we get the show's biggest — one of its only — heart-warming moments since Louie took his daughters out to a sunrise breakfast at the end of season one and that absurdly uplifting 'Bad Night' song played. It's a perfect New York ending, twenty-story Diddy billboard and all."

Paste gave the episode a 9.4 out of 10 and wrote, "This arc, with its myriad of celebrities and far more plot-based structure than the rest of the show, has been in some ways the most ambitious thing Louie has done so far. And like its hero, the show managed to succeed, even though next week it'll be back where it started." Neal Lynch of TV Fanatic gave the episode a 3 star out of 5 rating and wrote, "Seems like a pretty decent finale, right? So, what in the hell does he have up his sleeve for the actual finale? How can he possibly top that life-changing trilogy? My guess is wipe it all away and bring him back to Ground Zero."
