= Barney/Never =

- Louie episode
- Episode no.: Season 3 Episode 6
- Directed by: Louis C.K.
- Written by: Louis C.K.
- Cinematography by: Paul Koestner
- Editing by: Louis C.K.; Susan E. Morse
- Production code: XCK03006
- Original release date: August 2, 2012
- Running time: 22 minutes

Guest appearances
- Robin Williams as Himself; Hadley Delany as Lilly; Jeremy Shinder as Never Cartesian; Edward Gelbinovich as Doug; Artie Lange as Truck Driver; Nancy Shayne as Nancy Cartesian; J. B. Smoove as Gravedigger #2; Big Jay Oakerson as Club MC

Episode chronology
← Previous "Daddy's Girlfriend"	Next → "Ikea/Piano Lesson"
- Louie (season 3)

"Barney/Never" is the sixth episode of the third season of the American comedy-drama television series Louie. It is the 32nd overall episode of the series and was written and directed by Louis C.K., who also serves as the lead actor. It was released on FX on August 2, 2012.

The series follows Louie, a fictionalized version of C.K., a comedian and newly divorced father raising his two daughters in New York City. In the episode, Louie and his friend Robin Williams attend a funeral, and Louie also has to look after a kid.

According to Nielsen Media Research, the episode was seen by an estimated 0.69 million household viewers and gained a 0.3 ratings share among adults aged 18–49. The episode received critical acclaim, with critics praising Robin Williams' performance, dark humor and absurdity.

== Plot ==
Louie (Louis C.K.) arrives at a funeral, also attended by Robin Williams. The funeral is for a comedy club manager, Barney Ross, although Louie and Robin are the only attendees. They go to a diner, where they introduce themselves and talk about Barney, agreeing he was an awful person who stole from all the comics he knew and then acted hurt when they refused to have anything to do with him outside of work. They both say they're not surprised no one else came to the funeral. They visit a strip club that Barney frequently attended, where they decline the dancers' requests for a lap dance. When they say Barney died, the whole club is devastated at the news, since Barney reserved his generosity for huge tips to the dancers and the tearful club MC. Louie and his new friend agree that whomever outlives the other will attend the funeral and they part on good terms.

While picking up Lilly (Hadley Delany), Louie is approached by Nancy (Nancy Shayne), a mentally-challenged school parent. She is undergoing a surgery and wants Louie to take care of her fat, weird son, Never (Jeremy Shinder). Despite Lilly saying she doesn't like him, Louie agrees to do so. Never proves to be a challenge for Louie, as he refuses to eat anything but raw meat and throws away Louie's rug through the window. Louie participates in a radio show to sell tickets for a comedy show, where he offends Kansas City and his call is hanged up. He also discovers that Never got diarrhea while in the bath tub, and makes him clean himself up. Lilly ignores Never's efforts to talk to her, and when Never tells Louie he's hurt that Lilly doesn't like him, Louie bluntly tells Never that his gross and selfish ways mean that no one will like him unless he pulls himself together. Never says that Nancy loves him just as he is, and Louie tells him that his mom is wrong, responding to Never's "threat" to tell on him to Nancy by stating he's fine with taking the heat.

== Production ==
=== Development ===
In July 2012, FX confirmed that the sixth episode of the season would be titled "Barney/Never", and that it would be written and directed by series creator and lead actor Louis C.K. This was C.K.'s 32nd writing and directing credit.

== Reception ==
=== Viewers ===
In its original American broadcast, "Barney/Never" was seen by an estimated 0.69 million household viewers with a 0.3 in the 18-49 demographics. This means that 0.3 percent of all households with televisions watched the episode. This was a 16% decrease in viewership from the previous episode, which was watched by 0.82 million viewers with a 0.4 in the 18-49 demographics.

=== Critical reviews ===
"Barney/Never" received critical acclaim. Eric Goldman of IGN gave the episode a perfect "masterpiece" 10 out of 10 and wrote, "There was no real connective tissue at all this week to the two stories told – not even any Louie standup to touch upon anything happening. And there didn't need to be, considering the two expertly told stories we got."

Nathan Rabin of The A.V. Club gave the episode a "B+" grade and wrote, "'Barney/Never' is a minor episode of Louie, a nice little breather following the claustrophobic intensity of the Parker Posey episodes, albeit one that toys around with the series' structure in interesting ways. The episode eschews the usual opening credit sequence and stand-up bits in favor of a pair of nicely observed vignettes that are no less amusing for being comparatively modest, at least by Louie’s wildly ambitious standards."

Alan Sepinwall of HitFix wrote, "I really enjoyed the climax of the first story, the work between Louis C.K. and the guest star in that one, and then the complete chaos caused by Never in the second story." Zach Dionne of Vulture wrote, "After an opening stretch of five heavily thematic, dramatically adventurous episodes, Louie has settled into its third season comfortably enough to lob us a double feature of short-form silliness. Insofar as there's a motif to 'Barney/Never', it is shitting."

Paste gave the episode an 8.6 out of 10 and wrote, "Many of Louie's best episodes are the ones that put together smaller incidents, and it's a nice change of pace to have the show do a few smaller vignettes to link them together. And fortunately, both halves of 'Barney/Never' are incredibly strong and make perfect sense together, since they're both focused on misjudgment." Neal Lynch of TV Fanatic gave the episode a 3 star out of 5 rating and wrote, "Anyone looking for closure from last week's episode with a Part 3 of 'Daddy's Girlfriend' didn't find it here. The free-spirited and fleeting Liz came and went. But, seeing how this installment of Louie opened, one might jump to a catastrophic conclusion."
