= Miami (Louie) =

- Louie episode
- Episode no.: Season 3 Episode 3
- Directed by: Louis C.K.
- Written by: Louis C.K.
- Cinematography by: Paul Koestner
- Editing by: Susan E. Morse
- Production code: XCK03003
- Original release date: July 12, 2012
- Running time: 22 minutes

Guest appearances
- Miguel Gomez as Ramon; Susan Kelechi Watson as Janet

Episode chronology
← Previous "Telling Jokes/Set Up"	Next → "Daddy's Girlfriend"
- Louie (season 3)

"Miami" is the third episode of the third season of the American comedy-drama television series Louie. It is the 29th overall episode of the series and was written and directed by Louis C.K., who also serves as the lead actor. It was released on FX on July 12, 2012.

The series follows Louie, a fictionalized version of C.K., a comedian and newly divorced father raising his two daughters in New York City. In the episode, Louie travels to Miami for a comedy gig, and establishes a friendship with a Cuban immigrant named Ramon.

According to Nielsen Media Research, the episode was seen by an estimated 1.06 million household viewers and gained a 0.5 ratings share among adults aged 18–49. The episode received positive reviews from critics, who praised the nature of the episode and chemistry between Louie and Ramon.

== Plot ==
Louie (Louis C.K.) travels to Miami for a comedy gig. He feels uncomfortable with going swimming with a crowd, so he sleeps and goes swimming in a much more deserted beach in the afternoon. During this, he notices that an employee is taking his chair with his items. As he calls him out, a person nearby mistakes him as drowning and "saves" him by taking him to the beach.

The man introduces himself as Ramon (Miguel Gomez), a Cuban immigrant. After drinking, he takes Louie to a family meeting, where Louie gets along pretty well with Ramon's family. Enjoying his time, Louie calls Janet (Susan Kelechi Watson) to inform him he will stay for a few more days. She deduces that he is staying for someone, not knowing that it is a man. When Ramon asks about his stay, Louie explains he just wanted to spend more time with him. Their conversation turns into an awkward talk where each one state they are not interested in each other. They still admit they enjoyed their time together, and part ways.

== Production ==
=== Development ===
In June 2012, FX confirmed that the third episode of the season would be titled "Miami", and that it would be written and directed by series creator and lead actor Louis C.K. This was C.K.'s 29th writing and directing credit.

== Reception ==
=== Viewers ===
In its original American broadcast, "Miami" was seen by an estimated 1.06 million household viewers with a 0.5 in the 18-49 demographics. This means that 0.5 percent of all households with televisions watched the episode. This was a slight decrease in viewership from the previous episode, which was watched by 1.08 million viewers with a 0.6 in the 18-49 demographics.

=== Critical reviews ===
"Miami" received positive reviews from critics. Eric Goldman of IGN gave the episode a "great" 8 out of 10 and wrote, "Like a lot of the less outwardly 'funny' Louie episodes, this was still quite engaging. And Louie's standup act at the end, about the fear heterosexual men have of being perceived as gay, gave us some more specifically focused jokes that ended this little pseudo love-story for Louie on a typically strong note."

Emily St. James of The A.V. Club gave the episode an "A–" grade and wrote, "There's not a lot of plot to 'Miami' — even by Louie standards — but that's okay. Just watching Louie out of his natural environment acts as almost a vacation for the viewer as well. C.K. captures the rhythms of Louie's trip well, and the early sections of the episode lay out the sort of comedian's routine Louie could have easily fallen into if not for meeting Ramon."

Alan Sepinwall of HitFix wrote, "They're both trying so hard to not be judgmental, and to get out of what has turned into a very uncomfortable conversation with as little pain as possible, that their conversation becomes almost excruciatingly funny, and the right capper to an excellent, bittersweet episode." Zach Dionne of Vulture wrote, "The first five minutes of this episode are nearly entirely sans dialogue. But even with this strong visual focus, C.K.'s dialogue writing is concise and sneakily hilarious."

Paste gave the episode a 7.8 out of 10 and wrote, "'Miami' was an almost great episode of Louie that was also one of the sweeter episodes the show's done. It didn't even require the appearance of the adorable girls who play his daughters in the show. However, it really did have a big problem, one that did a good job at showing just how big of an effect small decisions have in making the show work: it's one of the few episodes of Louie that trips right at the finish line." Neal Lynch of TV Fanatic gave the episode a 4.1 star out of 5 rating and wrote, "In watching this comedy born from real-life drama, the laughs are more genuine, they don't come cheap. Louie makes us earn each and every chuckle, but despite the fact our enjoyment comes from something artificial (a fictional show), it's still fulfilling and enriching."
