= New Year's Eve (Louie) =

- Louie episode
- Episode no.: Season 3 Episode 13
- Directed by: Louis C.K.
- Written by: Louis C.K.
- Cinematography by: Paul Koestner
- Editing by: Louis C.K.
- Production code: XCK03013
- Original release date: September 27, 2012
- Running time: 25 minutes

Guest appearances
- Amy Poehler as Debbie; Parker Posey as Liz; Hadley Delany as Lilly; Ursula Parker as Jane; Susan Kelechi Watson as Janet; Gary Wilmes as Patrick

Episode chronology
← Previous "Late Show"	Next → "Back"
- Louie (season 3)

"New Year's Eve" is the thirteenth episode and season finale of the third season of the American comedy-drama television series Louie. It is the 39th overall episode of the series and was written and directed by Louis C.K., who also serves as the lead actor. It was released on FX on September 27, 2012.

The series follows Louie, a fictionalized version of C.K., a comedian and newly divorced father raising his two daughters in New York City. In the episode, Louie feels alone in New Year's Eve and considers on what to do.

According to Nielsen Media Research, the episode was seen by an estimated 0.43 million household viewers and gained a 0.2 ratings share among adults aged 18–49. The episode received critical acclaim, with critics praising the performances, directing and emotional tone. At the 65th Primetime Emmy Awards, Louis C.K. received a nomination for Outstanding Directing for a Comedy Series.

== Plot ==
On Christmas, Lilly (Hadley Delany) and Jane (Ursula Parker) open their gifts. Unaware to them, Louie (Louis C.K.) had so much trouble in wrapping the gifts, such as fighting for a toy, and having to break a doll as the eyes were not properly set. Afterwards, he reads them The Story About Ping, which revolves around a domesticated Chinese duck lost on the Yangtze River. Later, the girls leave with Janet (Susan Kelechi Watson) and their new step-father. After that, Louie gets rid of the Christmas decorations and sleeps in the dark.

Louie is called by his sister, Debbie (Amy Poehler). Not wanting Louie to be alone on New Year's Eve, she invites him to accompany her family to Mexico and visit their grandmother. While sleeping, Louie dreams about Lilly and Jane in their 20s, commenting on how alone the older Louie is. An alarmed Louie wakes up, deciding to go to Mexico. While on the bus, Louie reunites with Liz (Parker Posey). However, she starts bleeding and collapses. Louie accompanies her in the hospital, where her carcinoma worsens. Liz bids farewell to Louie before she is pronounced dead just one minute short of New Year.

At the airport, Louie prepares to take a flight to Mexico, but instead decides to fly to Beijing. He tries to get to Yangtze River, asking locals for help, to no success. A local leaves him in a local field, so Louie decides to explore the area. He is invited to a house, where a family allows him to dine with them. Despite not understanding Chinese, Louie has a fun time with the family.

== Production ==
=== Development ===
In September 2012, FX confirmed that the thirteenth episode of the season would be titled "New Year's Eve", and that it would be written and directed by series creator and lead actor Louis C.K. This was C.K.'s 39th writing and directing credit.

== Reception ==
=== Viewers ===
In its original American broadcast, "New Year's Eve" was seen by an estimated 0.43 million household viewers with a 0.2 in the 18-49 demographics. This means that 0.2 percent of all households with televisions watched the episode. This was a 21% decrease in viewership from the previous episode, which was watched by 0.54 million viewers with a 0.3 in the 18-49 demographics.

=== Critical reviews ===
"New Year's Eve" received critical acclaim. Eric Goldman of IGN gave the episode an "amazing" 9 out of 10 and wrote, "There were some interesting echoes in this episode of last season's 'Duckling' episode, with both involving, well, ducks and also Louie having a poignant experience in a foreign country. No, 'New Year's Eve' didn't reach the amazing heights of the truly incredible 'Duckling', but it still was a nice, sweet story in and of itself, with Louis C.K. giving a very good performance, showing the different moods he was going through."

Nathan Rabin of The A.V. Club gave the episode an "A" grade and wrote, "It's a gloriously cinematic, enigmatic close to an another spectacular season of Louie that tackled love and loss, ambition and determination with honesty, humor and an exquisite sense of pathos that somehow never devolved into sentimentality. By this point we as an audience trust Louis C.K. completely and will follow him anywhere his muse leads, even if it's the mountains of Beijing."

Alan Sepinwall of HitFix wrote, "Knowing how the rest of the season went, we can assume that Louie will be back to his old miserable self within days (if not hours) of his return to America, but it's a lovely way to conclude his journey for the season." James Poniewozik of Time wrote, "Some sitcoms have ideas behind them. Some wind up episodes with little lessons or observations about life. But it's a rare sitcom that has a philosophy — that sets itself up, not as a source of answers, but as an investigation into the question of how to live. It's a rarer sitcom still that can pull that off without seeming ridiculous or full of crap, and while still being funny. Louie is that sitcom, and last night's season finale, 'New Year's Eve,' encapsulated the hilarious, surreal, openhearted ways this season has pursued that quest."

Paste gave the episode an 8 out of 10 and wrote, "It's intentionally fragmented and disparate, filled with experiments, some successful and others disappointing. I'm sure almost everyone has felt that way, even if their preferences were different from my own. So while I'd prefer that the season's finale were another in a series of great episodes, that it isn't seems more fitting, since this is more what the show's about." Neal Lynch of TV Fanatic gave the episode a 4.3 star out of 5 rating and wrote, "Would I have seen THIS as the season finale? No. Not the sendoff I was hoping for, but like I've peppered throughout this review... it's fitting. We couldn't end with Louie's moral victory last week; that would have been the expectation. Instead, we float away from him as he gets cozy with some random Chinese family on the outskirts of Beijing. A happy moment wrapped in a very sad existence."

=== Accolades ===
For the episode, Louis C.K. was nominated for Outstanding Directing for a Comedy Series at the 65th Primetime Emmy Awards. He would lose to Modern Family for the episode "Arrested".
