= Ikea/Piano Lesson =

- Louie episode
- Episode no.: Season 3 Episode 7
- Directed by: Louis C.K.
- Story by: Louis C.K.; Pamela Adlon
- Teleplay by: Louis C.K.
- Cinematography by: Paul Koestner
- Editing by: Louis C.K.; Susan E. Morse
- Production code: XCK03007
- Original release date: August 9, 2012
- Running time: 22 minutes

Guest appearances
- Maria Dizzia as Delores; Maria Bamford as Herself; Sarah Silverman as Herself; Marc Maron as Himself

Episode chronology
← Previous "Barney/Never"	Next → "Dad"
- Louie (season 3)

"Ikea/Piano Lesson" is the seventh episode of the third season of the American comedy-drama television series Louie. It is the 33rd overall episode of the series and was written and directed by Louis C.K., who also serves as the lead actor, with Pamela Adlon receiving a story credit. It was released on FX on August 9, 2012.

The series follows Louie, a fictionalized version of C.K., a comedian and newly divorced father raising his two daughters in New York City. In the episode, Louie accompanies a woman to an IKEA, and also realizes a sexual encounter may have had consequences.

According to Nielsen Media Research, the episode was seen by an estimated 0.70 million household viewers and gained a 0.4 ratings share among adults aged 18–49. The episode received extremely positive reviews from critics, who praised the humor and guest stars, although the segments received some criticism for not fully exploring their concepts.

== Plot ==
Louie (Louis C.K.) is approached by Delores (Maria Dizzia), (Note: Previously seen in "Bummer/Blueberries".) asking him to accompany her to therapy for their previous sexual encounter, to which Louie refuses. She then asks him in accompanying her to an IKEA store in New Jersey for items for her house, which he agrees. Louie is not cooperative with the items, frustrating Delores and causing her to cry in the store. They eventually leave the store with the items, their relationship now in a better place.

Louie takes piano lessons, but the session is interrupted when he is called by Maria Bamford, telling him she has crabs and due to their encounter, Louie might have it as well. After taking a picture in the bathroom, he realizes he contracted it. He goes to a pharmacy for shampoo, but the service is delayed due to an old woman asking for a specific product.

While watching TV, Louie finds old comedy acts of the 1980s, one of which includes a young "Louie C.K." Afterwards, Sarah Silverman performs, which prompts Louie to call her about her performance. Their conversation soon changes to Marc Maron, with Louie explaining they are in bad terms for an unspecific event. However, Louie realizes that Louie himself is the one to blame for the event, not Marc as he thought. He visits Marc to apologize, until Marc explains that he already did it five years ago, confusing Louie.

== Production ==
=== Development ===
In July 2012, FX confirmed that the sixth episode of the season would be titled "Barney/Never", and that it would be written and directed by series creator and lead actor Louis C.K., from a story he co-wrote with Pamela Adlon. This was C.K.'s 33rd writing and directing credit, and Adlon's third writing credit.

== Reception ==
=== Viewers ===
In its original American broadcast, "Ikea/Piano Lesson" was seen by an estimated 0.70 million household viewers with a 0.4 in the 18-49 demographics. This means that 0.4 percent of all households with televisions watched the episode. This was a slight increase in viewership from the previous episode, which was watched by 0.69 million viewers with a 0.3 in the 18-49 demographics.

=== Critical reviews ===
"Ikea/Piano Lesson" received extremely positive reviews from critics. Eric Goldman of IGN gave the episode an "amazing" 9 out of 10 and wrote, "The final story felt almost uncomfortably real, as we watched TV's Louie watch footage of actual Louie C.K. when he was younger, thinner and had more hair. Louie looking at himself in the computer screen contrasted with his young self, clearly unhappy with the differences, felt very honest – but also with that knowing, humorous tinge that this show manages to capture in many of its more moody moments."

Nathan Rabin of The A.V. Club gave the episode a "B" grade and wrote, "The two halves of tonight's Louie aren't as well-united as last week's little duo, but by the end of the hour, there's a strong sense of history running through the series, as well as a sense that even when people try to do nice things, they're mostly just thinking about themselves."

Alan Sepinwall of HitFix wrote, "There are times when we get a two-story Louie episode – though tonight's came close to being a three-story outing – where Louis C.K. has clearly just put these parts together because they combined to fit the timeslot. 'Ikea/Piano Lesson' was one of those outings, though, where I have to wonder if he either always intended for the pieces to go together, or if he at least recognized once they were done how well they fit thematically as well as time-wise." Zach Dionne of Vulture wrote, "Last week's Louie was season three's first foray into independent, only thematically related story lines. There were laughs, and there was Robin Williams, but the episode left something to be desired. Had Louie funneled all its greatness toward longer stories and lost its keen touch for the dual-vignette episode? Absolutely not, because 'Ikea/Piano Lesson' is a flawless, instant classic."

Paste gave the episode an 8.7 out of 10 and wrote, "The show's two halves have little to do with each other, thematically or otherwise, and they don't particularly complement each other. However, the second half was so strong it still made 'Ikea/Piano' a must-see episode, one that once again takes the show in an unexpected direction." Neal Lynch of TV Fanatic gave the episode a 3 star out of 5 rating and wrote, "In some ways, 'Ikea; Piano Lesson' had that feel to it. But Louie's better than that, so he gives it his own twist. The theme is the past. More specifically, learning your lesson from the past. Louie's been through heartbreaks and setbacks, downfalls and falling outs. Yet this episode shows that he hasn't learned a goddam thing."
