= Dad (Louie) =

- Louie episode
- Episode no.: Season 3 Episode 8
- Directed by: Louis C.K.
- Written by: Louis C.K.
- Cinematography by: Paul Koestner
- Editing by: Louis C.K.
- Production code: XCK03008
- Original release date: August 16, 2012
- Running time: 22 minutes

Guest appearances
- F. Murray Abraham as Excelsior; Ursula Parker as Jane; Sarah Silverman as Herself; Rick Crom as Rick; Nick Di Paolo as Nick; Jim Norton as Jim; William Stephenson as William

Episode chronology
← Previous "Ikea/Piano Lesson"	Next → "Looking for Liz/Lilly Changes"
- Louie (season 3)

"Dad" is the eighth episode of the third season of the American comedy-drama television series Louie. It is the 34th overall episode of the series and was written and directed by Louis C.K., who also serves as the lead actor. It was released on FX on August 16, 2012.

The series follows Louie, a fictionalized version of C.K., a comedian and newly divorced father raising his two daughters in New York City. In the episode, Louie is visited by his uncle, who convinces him in reconnecting with his estranged father.

According to Nielsen Media Research, the episode was seen by an estimated 0.84 million household viewers and gained a 0.4 ratings share among adults aged 18–49. The episode received critical acclaim, with critics praising the humor, themes and performances, although some felt that the vignettes didn't fit together.

== Plot ==
After a bad experience at a store, Louie (Louis C.K.) meets with his uncle, Excelsior (F. Murray Abraham), at the Russian Tea Room. Excelsior explains that while visiting Boston, he ran into Louie's estranged father. His father was lamenting being alone and how Louie does not visit him. Excelsior convinces him to visit his father.

Louie starts developing a rash, with his doctor suggesting he should visit his father to cure it. He arrives at Boston, where he vomits on top of a car. He also gets into an argument with a bystander, during which his nose bleeds. The bystander provides him with a towel and advises him to visit his dad. As he is about to knock on his door, Louie panics and flees in a Can-Am Spyder. He reaches the harbor and leaves Boston on a speedboat. Alone at the sea, he laughs at the situation.

== Production ==
=== Development ===
In July 2012, FX confirmed that the eighth episode of the season would be titled "Dad", and that it would be written and directed by series creator and lead actor Louis C.K.. This was C.K.'s 34th writing and directing credit.

== Reception ==
=== Viewers ===
In its original American broadcast, "Dad" was seen by an estimated 0.84 million household viewers with a 0.4 in the 18-49 demographics. This means that 0.4 percent of all households with televisions watched the episode. This was a 20% increase in viewership from the previous episode, which was watched by 0.70 million viewers with a 0.4 in the 18-49 demographics.

=== Critical reviews ===
"Dad" received critical acclaim. Eric Goldman of IGN gave the episode a perfect "masterpiece" 10 out of 10 and wrote, "This instantly became one of my favorite Louie episodes. While it went from scenario to scenario, with the exception of the scene in the Best Buy proxy (which was a very funny, relatable scene in and of itself - with some wish fulfillment both from the customer and clerk), it all told one story – about Louie's major daddy issues. But each sequence also had its own energy and humor."

Nathan Rabin of The A.V. Club gave the episode a "B+" grade and wrote, "Rather than gently take us by the hand and explain everything, it tosses us into the deep end, then hopes we know how to swim. Where the conventional sitcom encourages passive viewing Louie requires active engagement. That's especially true of 'Dad', an alternately exhilarating and maddening exercise in obfuscation and ambiguity."

Alan Sepinwall of HitFix wrote, "I think this is the most I've laughed all season, and it's more than I laughed through much of last season, as well. Just a collection of great little comic vignettes. Yet as much as I liked each piece, they didn't quite fit together as I watched them, and the fantasy ending of Louie racing through Boston and then out onto the Atlantic to get away from his father felt abrupt."

Zach Dionne of Vulture wrote, "Flashes of the ridiculous have abounded in Louie's two-point-six seasons. The moments have accumulated so precipitously that, while writing and talking about Louie, I know to keep a hat nearby stocked with mostly interchangeable words like wacky, absurd, bananas, and yes, the anchor, silly. One or two can usually get me through an episode. But with so many instances crammed into the single installment that was 'Dad,' it feels worthwhile to step back and wonder whether this was Louie at peak ludicrousness. I was wrong to see the title and expect a story mirroring something as heavy and filmic as season one's similarly bluntly titled 'God.' So, so wrong." Neal Lynch of TV Fanatic gave the episode a 3 star out of 5 rating and wrote, "What's it all supposed to mean? We're weren't given the standard To Be Continued like with were in 'Daddy’s Girlfriend Part 1' or with any other cliffhanger that doesn't neatly tie loose ends. But that's Louie and that's life. The show is a situational comedy, the antithesis of 'sitcom.' And I don't think anyone will get sick of that anytime soon."
