= Something Is Wrong =

- Louie episode
- Episode no.: Season 3 Episode 1
- Directed by: Louis C.K.
- Written by: Louis C.K.
- Cinematography by: Paul Koestner
- Editing by: Susan E. Morse
- Production code: XCK03001
- Original release date: June 28, 2012
- Running time: 22 minutes

Guest appearances
- Gaby Hoffmann as April; Susan Kelechi Watson as Janet; Gary Wilmes as Patrick

Episode chronology
← Previous "New Jersey/Airport"	Next → "Telling Jokes/Set Up"
- Louie (season 3)

"Something Is Wrong" is the first episode of the third season of the American comedy-drama television series Louie. It is the 27th overall episode of the series and was written and directed by Louis C.K., who also serves as the lead actor. It was released on FX on June 28, 2012.

The series follows Louie, a fictionalized version of C.K., a comedian and newly divorced father raising his two daughters in New York City. In the episode, Louie faces a dilemma with his girlfriend, and then decides to buy a motorcycle.

According to Nielsen Media Research, the episode was seen by an estimated 1.43 million household viewers and gained a 0.7 ratings share among adults aged 18–49. The episode received positive reviews from critics, who praised the tone and directing, although some felt that the episode wasn't favorably compared to the rest of the following episodes.

== Plot ==
Louie (Louis C.K.) arrives at a diner, parking his car. He notes a sign that makes confusing claims, such as cars only allowed to park after midnight. He goes inside to meet his girlfriend, April (Gaby Hoffmann). As she explains some of her problems, she reads Louie's body language and deduces something is wrong. She begins to think Louie wants to break up with her, despite Louie denying it. She decides to make it easier for him and breaks up with him, leaving him in the diner. He later goes outside, seeing that his car has been demolished by a repair crew for parking it there.

Louie arrives at a shop, impressed by a motorcycle. Finding that it costs just $7,500, he decides to buy it. While riding through New York, he gets distracted by a gang of bikers pulling off a wheelie, causing him to crash his motorcycle. As he is tended in the hospital, he calls his ex-wife Janet (Susan Kelechi Watson), informing her that he cannot pick up their children from school, angering her. He is let go of the hospital, despite feeling pain in his leg.

Later, Louie is visited by April, who wanted to get her laptop back. Seeing his condition, she decides to put him in the sofa and make him food. As she leaves, Louie suggests she should stay. She tells him they really need to stay apart, as it will save him from going through another divorce and storms off.

== Production ==
=== Development ===
In June 2012, FX confirmed that the first episode of the season would be titled "Something Is Wrong", and that it would be written and directed by series creator and lead actor Louis C.K. This was C.K.'s 27th writing and directing credit.

== Reception ==
=== Viewers ===
In its original American broadcast, "Something Is Wrong" was seen by an estimated 1.43 million household viewers with a 0.7 in the 18-49 demographics. This means that 0.7 percent of all households with televisions watched the episode. This was a massive 150% increase in viewership from the previous episode, which was watched by 0.57 million viewers with a 0.3 in the 18-49 demographics.

=== Critical reviews ===
"Something Is Wrong" received positive reviews from critics. Eric Goldman of IGN gave the episode a "good" 7.5 out of 10 and wrote, "I actually found the Season 3 premiere... good. It had several great Louie moments, but I didn't think it quite added up to how wonderful the show usually is."

Nathan Rabin of The A.V. Club gave the episode an "A–" grade and wrote, "It's the kind of thing Louie does better than any other show on television, pulling back on a seemingly small moment of attempted connection to reveal a much bigger cosmic picture. In his weakness, C.K. can't see beyond his neediness and loneliness, but Hoffmann sees the long view and acts accordingly. She understands that a few moments of comfort in the present aren't worth years of unhappiness and frustration in the long run. It's a quietly philosophical moment that captures what's great about Louie. Louie is funny, often explosively so, but, to borrow the title of a box set by Richard Pryor, it's deep too."

Alan Sepinwall of HitFix wrote, "'Something Is Wrong' was definitely the most lightweight of the five episodes I got to see in advance – and by that I mean comedy as well as the character and thematic work. It's a wry shaggy dog story about how Louie has difficulty saying what he wants with some good moments of deadpan humor. But compared to the best of last season, or to much of what's coming over the next month, this was on the disposable side of things." Roger Cormier of Vulture wrote, "So 'Something is Wrong', the third season premiere of the series that aired last night, was an average episode of Louie, so basically it was only funny, too honest and successfully weird."

Paste gave the episode an 8.2 out of 10 and wrote, "The show didn't return to the air with guns blazing, letting loose with a torrent of hilarious moments, neither did it really try something new. As much as there can be one, this was a complete return to form for Louie, a first episode that seems concerned with delivering the same rewards as the past two seasons. However, because the show features so many different types of content, this doesn't feel as stale as it would on other scripted comedies. Instead, it was just refreshing to see that the show hasn't lost its spark, an opening that makes it clear that season three will likely be as good as the first two." Matt Richenthal of TV Fanatic gave the episode a 4.6 star out of 5 rating and wrote, "Louie isn't a bad guy by any means, but he's a somber soul and it's his quest to figure out how to be happy - by sticking in a less-than-ideal relationship? By riding a motorcycle? - that makes this quite possibly the best show on television."
