= Eunice Anderson =

American actress (1922–2023)

- Born: 1922
- Died: February 7, 2023 (aged 100–101)
- Occupation: Actress
- Years active: 1960–2023

Eunice Anderson (1922 – February 7, 2023) was an American actress who appeared in a number of films and episodes of television shows, as well as on stage. Her credits include the films Jeremy (1973), A League of Their Own (1992), The Narrows (2008), and Falling Awake (2009), as well as the made-for-television film Concealed Enemies (1984).

From 1960 to 1963 she lived in Europe and played theatre and film parts there. On stage, she was on Broadway as part of the cast of The Great Indoors in 1966 and Herzl in 1976. Off Broadway appearances have included Maids and The Three Sisters, among others. She appeared in The Chalk Garden in 1981. She also had a successful two-year run playing the role of Millie in The Hot L Baltimore at the Circle in the Square Theatre in Greenwich Village.

One of her last television appearance was the "Country Drive" episode (2011) of Louie, where she portrayed the bigoted elderly great-aunt of the eponymous show's central character. Her performance was well received. In the end of that episode, she briefly mentions having attended the University of Chicago. Other appearances include Naked City, the "Bound" episode (2004) of Law & Order: Special Victims Unit and the "Old People Creep Me Out" episode (2010) of the short-lived Gravity.

Anderson died on February 7, 2023.
