= New Jersey/Airport =

- Louie episode
- Episode no.: Season 2 Episode 13
- Directed by: Louis C.K.
- Written by: Louis C.K.
- Cinematography by: Paul Koestner
- Editing by: Louis C.K.
- Production code: XCK02014
- Original release date: September 8, 2011
- Running time: 28 minutes

Guest appearances
- F. Murray Abraham as John; Pamela Adlon as Pamela; Chris Rock as Himself; Jenn Lyon as Eunice; Steven Wright as Himself

Episode chronology
← Previous "Niece"	Next → "Something Is Wrong"
- Louie (season 2)

"New Jersey/Airport" is the thirteenth episode and season finale of the second season of the American comedy-drama television series Louie. It is the 26th overall episode of the series and was written and directed by Louis C.K., who also serves as the lead actor. It was released on FX on September 8, 2011.

The series follows Louie, a fictionalized version of C.K., a comedian and newly divorced father raising his two daughters in New York City. In the episode, Louie experiences a weird trip with a woman, and also faces his feelings for Pamela as she plans to leave.

According to Nielsen Media Research, the episode was seen by an estimated 0.57 million household viewers and gained a 0.3 ratings share among adults aged 18–49. The episode received critical acclaim, with critics praising the humor, performances, character development and ending.

== Plot ==
After a stand-up set at Caroline's, Louie (Louis C.K.) goes to the bar, encountering Steven Wright. Steven feels like Louie should have a woman to have sex with after the set. Louie is unmoved by his idea, although he later considers it. Outside, he is approached by a woman named Eunice (Jenn Lyon) in a car, who offers to "show him her pussy". Louie is reluctant in accepting, but eventually cedes in and joins her in her car. She takes him to her house in New Jersey, revealing that she is married to a man named John (F. Murray Abraham). Eunice wants to share him with her husband, but Louie refuses to go with it, causing John to kick him out of the house. Forced to walk home, he calls Chris Rock to help him. Rock picks him up, and both discuss Louie's irresponsibility. He takes him to his house, where Rock's wife insults Louie.

Louie takes Pamela (Pamela Adlon) to the airport, as she intends to leave for Paris, where her husband has been staying with her son, and fears that her son prefers staying with her ex-husband. Pamela explains that she intends to stay with her ex-husband, despite Louie claiming that he is not right for her. Louie wants her to stay with him, but she tells him that he needs to move on. As she leaves for the terminal, she yells "wave to me". Louie misunderstands it as "wait for me", and happily exclaims "I will wait for you" as she walks away. Louie leaves the airport, smiling.

== Production ==
=== Development ===
The episode was written and directed by series creator and lead actor Louis C.K., marking his 26th writing and directing credit for the series.

=== Writing ===
The first segment was based on a experience by C.K. After a performance, he was approached by a woman for sex but balked off after the woman wanted her husband to watch them in the act. He said, "To me, the idea of being taken to another state, out of the city, out of the comfort zone, where I can't escape easily, that made it scary and made it worth doing."

On the second segment, C.K. explained, "To me, the greatest thing was to end the season on what I think is a really happy note. All of this misery that people have sat through, I think has paid off, but they get fucked because they know that I am a complete loser and that nothing is down the road for me."

== Reception ==
=== Viewers ===
In its original American broadcast, "New Jersey/Airport" was seen by an estimated 0.57 million household viewers with a 0.3 in the 18-49 demographics. This means that 0.3 percent of all households with televisions watched the episode. This was a 42% decrease in viewership from the previous episode, which was watched by 0.98 million viewers with a 0.6 in the 18-49 demographics.

=== Critical reviews ===
"New Jersey; Airport" received critical acclaim. Nathan Rabin of The A.V. Club gave the episode an "A–" grade and wrote, "While not quite as moving as the quietly epic final shot of last season’s premiere, 'Airport' ends a superb season on a perfectly bittersweet, open note. 'Duckling' would have made for a more epic conclusion, but then part of Louie's charm lies in its intimacy. It's a show about the way one man's mind makes sense of an insane world that just keeps getting better. Season three cannot come quickly enough."

Alan Sepinwall of HitFix wrote, "A fine, bittersweet ending to this tremendous, tremendous season." James Poniewozik of TIME wrote, "it was not one of my favorite episodes of the season. Nor did it close on a note to match the transcendent diner-pancakes scene that ended season one. But it was probably one of the most representative episodes, hitting on most every theme and device that has marked this terrific season of TV."

Joshua Kurp of Vulture wrote, "It was a well shot, painful, and hilarious ending, to a well shot, painful, and hilarious season, one of the best TV has ever seen." Ken Tucker of Entertainment Weekly wrote, "One of the great things about Louie C.K. is that he never strains to be edgy; his effort goes into presenting an artful rendition of his life, offered in a jagged form that is the visual version of the thoughts he works out in his stand-up routines."
