= Growing pains =

- Specialty: Pediatrics

Growing pains are recurring pain symptoms that are relatively common in children aged 3 to 16. The pains normally appear at night and can affect the calf or thigh muscles of one or both legs. The pain usually stops on its own before morning.

Growing pains are one of the most common causes of recurring pain in children. Although these pains reliably stop when the child has completely finished growing, it likely has nothing to do with growth.

== Signs and symptoms ==
Growing pains usually affect both legs, especially the calf muscle in the lower leg or the muscles in the front of the thighs. Pain may also occur in the ankle muscles and tops of the feet. Less commonly, the arms are affected. The pain is frequently, but not always, felt on both sides, simultaneously. Typically, the pains are felt in the muscles, rather than in the joints. The amount of pain can vary from mild to quite severe.

The pains most often begin in the evening or at night. When the pains appear while the child is sleeping, they often wake the child up at night. The pains can last from 30 minutes to 2 hours or more, and are usually, but not always, gone by morning. Typically, the pains appear once or twice each week, but can occur more or less frequently.

The pains are not in the same place as an injury, including overuse injuries such as shin splints, and the child does not limp while walking.

== Cause ==
The causes of growing pains are unknown. They are not associated with growth spurts, and some authors suggest alternative terms as providing a more accurate description, such as recurrent limb pain in childhood, paroxysmal nocturnal pains, or benign idiopathic paroxysmal nocturnal limb pains of childhood.

Theories of causation include:

- poor posture or other mechanical or anatomical defects, such as joint hypermobility;
- vascular perfusion disorder,
- lower pain threshold or a Amplified musculoskeletal pain syndrome,
- tiredness, perhaps especially among children with weaker bones than average who have overexerted themselves; and
- psychological factors, such as stress within the family.

Some parents are able to associate episodes of pain with physical exercise or mood changes in the child.

== Diagnosis ==
This diagnosis is normally made by considering the information presented by the child and family members, and by doing a physical exam to make sure that the child seems to be otherwise healthy. When the child has the typical symptoms and appears to be healthy, then laboratory investigations to exclude other diagnoses is not warranted.

When a child has growing pains, there are no objective clinical signs of inflammation, such as swollen joints. Children with growing pains do not have signs of any systemic diseases (such as fever or skin rashes), any abnormal pain sensations, tender spots, or joint disorders. Children do not have growing pains if the pain worsens over time, persists during the daytime, only involves one limb, or is located in a joint. It should be excluded if the child is limping, loses the ability to walk, or has physical signs that suggest other medical conditions.

Childhood-onset restless legs syndrome is sometimes misdiagnosed as growing pains. Other possible causes of pain in the limbs include injuries, infections, benign tumors such as osteoid osteoma, malignant tumors such as osteosarcoma, and problems that affect the shape and function of the legs, such as genu valgum (knock-knees).

== Treatment ==
Parents and children can be substantially reassured by explaining the benign and self-limiting nature of the pains. Local massage, hot baths, hot water bottles or heating pads, topical heat rubs and analgesic drugs such as paracetamol (acetaminophen) are often used during pain episodes. Twice-daily stretching of the quadriceps, hamstrings, and gastrosoleus muscles can make the leg pains resolve more quickly when it appears.

== Prognosis ==
Growing pains are not associated with other serious disease and usually resolves by late childhood. Commonly, episodes of growing pains become less severe and less frequent over time, and many children outgrow them after one or two years.

Frequent episodes are capable of having a substantial effect on the life of the child.

== Epidemiology ==
Growing pains likely affect about 10 to 20% of children, and the rate may be as high as about 40% among children aged four to six. Individuals can vary markedly in when they experience growing pains.

== History ==
Growing pains were first described as such in 1823 by a French doctor, Marcel Duchamp, and the cause was attributed to the growth process. A century later, mainstream medicine thought that the pains were caused by a mild case of rheumatic fever.

== See also ==
- Cramp
- Weather pains
