= Ursula Parker =

American violinist (born 2003)

- Born: July 28, 2003 (age 22); New York City, NY, United States
- Occupations: Actress, Violinist, Software Project Manager
- Years active: 2010–present
- Website: https://ursulaparker.dev/

Ursula Parker (born July 28, 2003) is an American violinist and former actress best known for her role as Jane in the television series Louie. She had prominent roles in the 2015 film Take Me to the River and the 2016 film Spectral. As of 2025, she is now a software project manager.
