= Hadley Delany =

American child actress from New York

- Born: New York, United States
- Occupation: Actress
- Years active: since 2010

Hadley Delany is a former American child actress best known for her role as Lilly on the television series Louie, who she portrayed throughout the show, from 2010 to 2015.

In 2013, Delany was one of six children selected as Kids of the Year by New York magazine for her contributions to the film industry as a child actor. She is currently studying law at the University of Michigan.

== Television work ==
Year	Title	Role	Episode	Reference(s)
2010	Law & Order: Special Victims Unit	Aubrey Elding	"Wet"	
2010–2015	Louie	Lilly	31 episodes	

== See also ==
Played lead of Mean Girls "I'd Rather Be Me" music video.
