= Susan E. Morse =

American film editor

- Born: 1952 (age 72–73)
- Occupation(s): Film and television editor
- Years active: 1976–present
- Spouse: Jack Richardson

Susan Edwina Morse (born 1952) is an American film editor with more than 30 film credits. She had a notable collaboration with director Woody Allen from 1977 to 1998. She's received nominations for an Academy Award, five BAFTA Awards, and a Primetime Emmy Award.

Her collaboration with Allen led to an Academy Award for Film Editing nomination for Hannah and Her Sisters (1986), as well as BAFTA Award for Best Editing nominations (for Manhattan (1979), Zelig (1983), Hannah and Her Sisters (1986), Radio Days (1987), and Crimes and Misdemeanors (1989). She also worked as an editor on Louis C.K.'s FX series Louie. She was nominated for the Primetime Emmy Award for Outstanding Picture Editing for a Comedy Series for her editing for the episode "Daddy's Girlfriend (Part Two)".

== Early life and education ==
Morse received a bachelor's degree in history from Yale University in 1974. Morse was one of the first female varsity captains in Yale history and the only junior in that group, in 1972/73, when she co-captained the field hockey team with Lawrie Mifflin, former Senior Editor at the New York Times. Morse remained the team's solo captain in their 1973/74 season.

== Career ==
=== Early career ===
In 1975, she enrolled as a graduate student at New York University to study film production and was almost immediately offered an internship on a PBS show directed by her professor Roberta Hodes, former script supervisor for Elia Kazan on On the Waterfront, among many other films.

=== Collaboration with Woody Allen ===
Morse's editing career began in September 1976 as an assistant to Ralph Rosenblum on Annie Hall. Rosenblum's last film with Allen was Interiors (1978), after which he worked as a director. Morse edited Rosenblum's first film, an adaptation of James Thurber's short story, The Greatest Man in the World (1980) starring Brad Davis; she was also an associate editor working with Thelma Schoonmaker on Raging Bull (1980), directed by Martin Scorsese. Starting with Manhattan (1979), she edited the next twenty of Allen's films through Celebrity (1998). Stephen Prince has summarized their collaboration as follows: "Susan E. Morse edited every Allen film of the eighties, regardless of its subject matter or visual design, and as we have seen Allen worked with a variety of cinematographers and production designers in those years. His insistent use of Morse demonstrates the essential nature of her collaboration." Morse's collaboration with Allen was the subject of a 1996 documentary film for German television.

Neither Morse nor Allen commented publicly on the end of their collaboration, but according to reporting in The New York Times, Morse was a victim of a cost-cutting move by producer Jean Doumanian that also severed ties with many other regular crew members on Allen's films. Bernard Weinraub wrote, "What especially stirred the New York film world in recent weeks was the disclosure that Susan E. Morse, Mr. Allen's widely admired film editor for 22 years, would not be working on his new, untitled movie, which starts shooting in New York in August." Alisa Lepselter succeeded Morse as Allen's editor, claiming she was inspired to go into film editing after hearing Morse speak on the subject near her childhood home in New Jersey.

=== Post-Allen editing career ===
Since 1998, Morse has edited films with several directors including Marc Lawrence, with whom she's worked on Two Weeks Notice (2002), Music and Lyrics (2007), and Did You Hear About the Morgans? (2009). She edited Last Night (2010), which was written and directed by Massy Tadjedin. In 2012, she edited the third season of the television series Louie; it had previously been primarily edited by its creator, Louis C.K. She edited the 2017 film Novitiate, which was written and directed by Maggie Betts. The film received generally favourable reviews from critics.

== Filmography ==
As a Editor

=== Film ===
Woody Allen films

- Manhattan (1979)
- Stardust Memories (1980)
- A Midsummer Night's Sex Comedy (1982)
- Zelig (1983)
- Broadway Danny Rose (1984)
- The Purple Rose of Cairo (1985)
- Hannah and Her Sisters (1986)
- Radio Days (1987)
- September (1987)
- Another Woman (1988)
- Crimes and Misdemeanors (1989)
- Alice (1990)
- Shadows and Fog (1991)
- Husbands and Wives (1992)
- Manhattan Murder Mystery (1993)
- Bullets Over Broadway (1994)
- Mighty Aphrodite (1995)
- Everyone Says I Love You (1996)
- Deconstructing Harry (1997)
- Celebrity (1998)

Other work as an editor

- The Warriors (1979)
- Arthur (1981)
- Miracles (1986)
- Two Weeks Notice (2002)
- Noel (2004)
- The Loss of a Teardrop Diamond (2008)
- Did You Hear About the Morgans? (2009)
- Last Night (2010)
- Novitiate (2017)

=== Television ===
- Louie (8 episodes, 2012)
- Billions (3 episodes, 2016)
- The Godfather of Harlem (3 episodes, 2019)

== Awards and nominations ==
Morse has been elected to membership in the American Cinema Editors and was honored at the 25th Annual Muse Awards Gala for New York Women in Film and Television, along with Tina Fey, Julianne Moore and Debra L. Lee, Chairman and CEO of BET Network in 2005.

Year	Award	Category	Project	Result	Ref.
1986	Academy Award	Best Film Editing	Hannah and Her Sisters	Nominated	
1979	BAFTA Award	Best Editing	Manhattan	Nominated	
1983	BAFTA Award	Best Editing	Zelig	Nominated	
1986	BAFTA Award	Best Editing	Hannah and Her Sisters	Nominated	
1987	BAFTA Award	Best Editing	Radio Days	Nominated	
1989	BAFTA Award	Best Editing	Crimes and Misdemeanors	Nominated	
2013	Primetime Emmy Award	Outstanding Picture Editing for a Comedy Series	Louie	Nominated	

== See also ==
- List of film director and editor collaborations
