= Louie (American TV series) =

American TV series

- Intertitle from seasons 1–3 & 5
- Genre: Black comedy; Comedy drama; Satire; Slice of life; Surreal humour; Cringe comedy
- Created by: Louis C.K.
- Written by: Louis C.K.
- Directed by: Louis C.K.
- Starring: Louis C.K.
- Opening theme: "Brother Louie" performed by Ian Lloyd (seasons 1–3 & 5)
- Country of origin: United States
- Original language: English
- No. of seasons: 5
- No. of episodes: 61 (list of episodes)

Production
- Executive producers: Louis C.K.; Dave Becky; M. Blair Breard
- Producers: Pamela Adlon; Tony Hernandez; Steven Wright
- Production location: New York City
- Editors: Louis C.K.; Doug Abel; Susan E. Morse; Gina Sansom
- Camera setup: Single-camera
- Running time: 19–41 minutes
- Production companies: 3 Arts Entertainment; Pig Newton, Inc.; FX Productions

Original release
- Network: FX
- Release: June 29, 2010 – May 28, 2015

Louie is an American comedy-drama television series that premiered on FX on June 29, 2010. It is written, directed, created, edited, and produced by comedian Louis C.K., who also stars in the show as a fictionalized version of himself, a comedian and newly divorced father raising his two daughters in New York City. The show has a loose format atypical for television comedy series, consisting of largely unconnected storylines and segments (described by FX president John Landgraf as "extended vignettes") that revolve around Louie's life, punctuated by live stand-up performances. The show's comedy consisted of such styles as surrealism, satire, absurdism, and gallows humor.

The show has been met with critical acclaim and was included in various critics' TV show top-ten lists when it premiered in 2010. C.K. has received several Primetime Emmy Award nominations for his acting, writing, and directing and has won for Outstanding Writing for a Comedy Series at the 64th and 66th Primetime Emmy Awards. It has been listed as one of the greatest television shows of all time and was included in the 101 Best Written TV Series list created by the Writers Guild of America.

During an "extended hiatus" for the show starting in 2015, FX ended their business partnership with C.K.'s production company, Pig Newton, in November 2017, after he confirmed that a series of sexual misconduct allegations against him were true. In 2018, Landgraf discussed the possibility of Louie returning.

== Synopsis ==
Louie is loosely based on the life of comedian Louis C.K., showing segments of him performing his stand-up routine onstage, and depicting his struggles as a divorced father of two girls. Each episode features either two stories (which may or may not connect thematically) or a longer full-episode story (often consisting of numerous connected shorter pieces).

The pieces are interspersed with short clips of Louie's stand-up, usually performed in New York comedy clubs, mainly the Comedy Cellar and Carolines in Manhattan. The stand-up in the show consists of original material recorded for the series, and is usually shot from the stage rather than from the more traditional audience perspective. Sometimes these comedy segments are integrated into the stories themselves, whereas other times they simply serve to bookend them with a loosely connected topic. In the first season, blunt, socially awkward conversations between Louie and his therapist are also shown occasionally. Beginning in the third season, some episodes do not feature any stand-up performances or the opening credit sequence.

Episodes in the series have standalone plots, although some recurring roles (e.g. Louie's playdate friend Pamela, portrayed by Pamela Adlon, who was C.K.'s co-star in Lucky Louie) occasionally provide story arc continuity between episodes. Continuity is not enforced; for example, Louie's mother has been portrayed in two very different ways. (Note: In the first season's seventh episode, "Double Date/Mom", Louie's mother is played by Mary Louise Wilson and is portrayed as a very spiteful woman. By contrast, in that season's eleventh episode, "God", a flashback to Louie's childhood shows the young Louie's mother as a very different woman with a kind-hearted personality, and she is played by Amy Landecker. Landecker also portrayed present-day Louie's date earlier in the season, in episode 9, "Bully".) As C.K. explained, "Every episode has its own goal, and if it messes up the goal of another episode, ... I just don't care." Some stories also take place outside of the show's main time frame. For two examples, the episode "God" depicts Louie's childhood, and the episode "Oh Louie" shows the comedian 9 years earlier in his career. Beginning in the third season, Louie has moved toward story continuity within the season, and it includes multi-episode story arcs.

The pilot episode includes segments depicting a school field trip and an embarrassing first date, with subsequent episodes covering a diverse range of material, including divorce, sex, sexual orientation, depression, and Catholic guilt.

== Episodes ==
Season	Episodes	Originally released	
Season	Episodes	First released	Last released
1	13	June 29, 2010	September 7, 2010
2	13	June 23, 2011	September 8, 2011
3	13	June 28, 2012	September 27, 2012
4	14	May 5, 2014	June 16, 2014
5	8	April 9, 2015	May 28, 2015

== Cast and characters ==
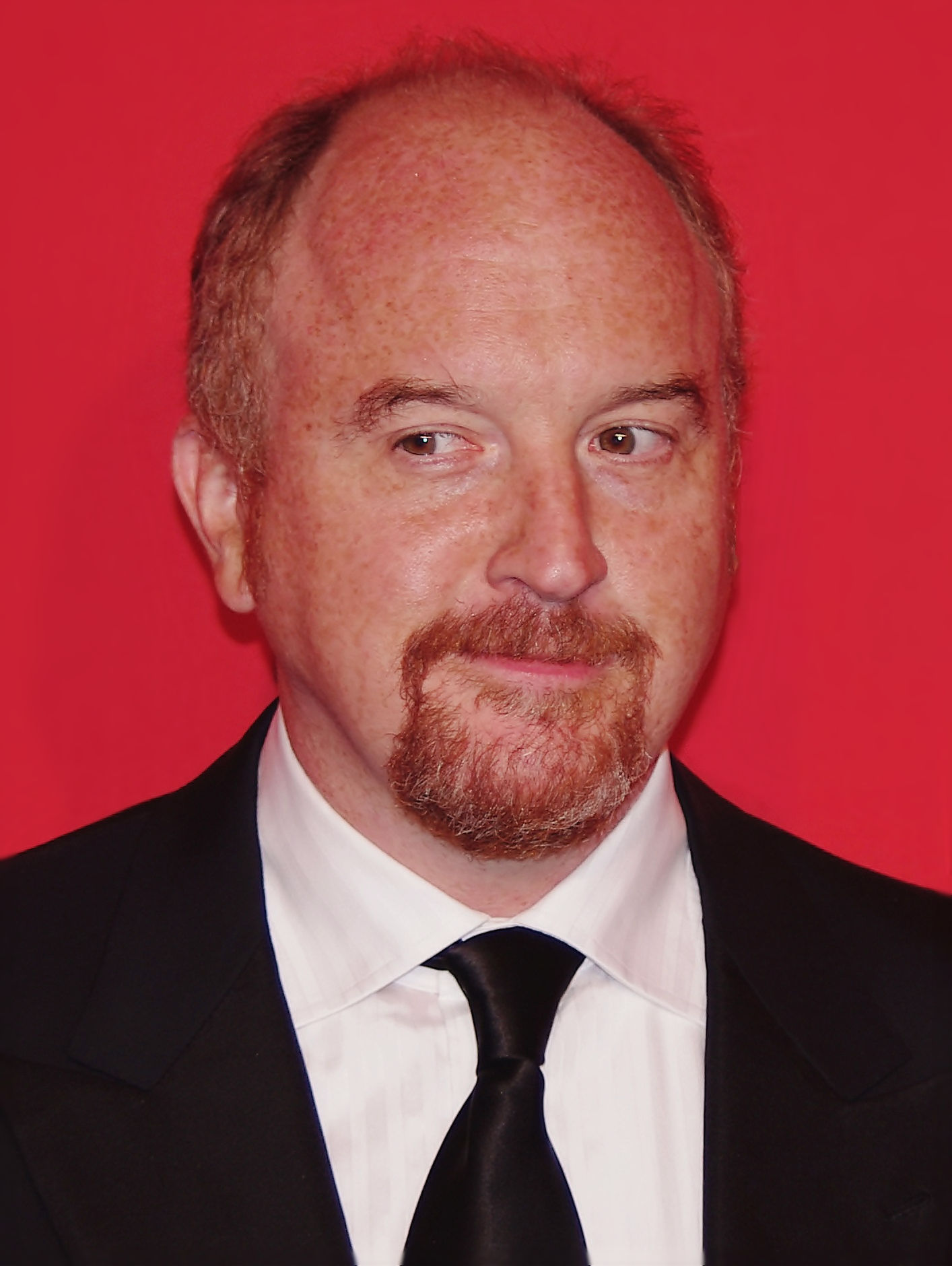
Series creator Louis C.K. plays the lead role and also writes and directs each episode.

C.K. serves as the show's lead and plays the only character who appears in every episode. Louie lacks a regular fixed cast, and instead features many guest appearances by stand-up comedians and actors. As a stand-up comedian in New York City, Louie's social circle on the show consists mainly of other comedians, and many notable comedians (such as Nick DiPaolo, Todd Barry, Jim Norton, Sarah Silverman, Chris Rock, and Jerry Seinfeld) have had recurring roles as fictionalized versions of themselves.

Most episodes tend to focus on Louie's interactions with new characters. However, the show features a number of recurring characters, including Louie's two daughters, Lilly (Hadley Delany) and Jane (Ursula Parker); his brother Bobby (Robert Kelly); his teenage-looking agent Doug (Edward Gelbinovich); Pamela (Pamela Adlon), his best friend and love interest; Dr. Ben (Ricky Gervais), Louie's juvenile and arrogant doctor; Louie's therapist (David Patrick Kelly); and his ex-wife, Janet (Susan Kelechi Watson).

Since Louie lacks continuity between episodes, supporting actors occasionally reappear in multiple roles, as is the case with William Stephenson, who appears as a bus driver in the pilot and as himself in "Oh Louie/Tickets"; Amy Landecker, who appears as Louie's date in "Bully" and as a young Louie's mother in "God" and "In the Woods"; and F. Murray Abraham, who plays a swinger in "New Jersey/Airport", Louie's uncle Excelsior in "Dad", and Louie's father in "In the Woods". Furthermore, Louie's mother and sisters have each been portrayed by multiple actresses, although his children have been consistently portrayed by Delany and Parker since the middle of the first season. His ex-wife is portrayed by Brooke Bloom in a flashback scene of "Elevator Part 4".

=== Recurring guests ===
- Hadley Delany as Lilly. Louie's older daughter. She is highly intelligent and earnest, but isn't happy at the public school she and her sister attend.
- Ursula Parker as Jane. Louie's younger daughter. She is precocious and impulsive, with a vivid imagination. She is a talented violinist with a knack for foreign languages. Jane is originally portrayed by Ashley Gerasimovich for four episodes in the first season before Parker took over the role.
- Pamela Adlon as Pamela. A friend of Louie's and potential love interest. Their children play together at the local playground, which is where Louie and Pamela form a friendship which causes Louie to have unrequited feelings for her. Pamela moves with her son to Paris in the second-season finale, hoping to reconcile with her estranged husband. She returns in the fourth season and is now willing to start a relationship with Louie. Adlon also serves as a consulting producer, has co-written five episodes with C.K. and was nominated for a writing Emmy.
- Susan Kelechi Watson as Janet. Louie's ex-wife.
- Todd Barry as Todd. A friend and rival of Louie's who constantly criticizes and patronizes him, albeit in jest. He is single and has no children, once describing for his comedian friends who are married with children (including Louie) what the hell he does all day.
- Hannibal Buress as Hannibal. A friend of Louie's that he plays poker with on a regular basis.
- Rick Crom as Rick. Another friend of Louie who plays poker with him regularly. He has dubbed himself "The supreme court judge on everything gay".
- Nick DiPaolo as Nick. One of Louie's closest friends whom he sees regularly to play poker. He is openly conservative and once got into a heated argument over the merits of President Barack Obama.
- Robert Kelly as Robbie, Louie's brother who tends to stress or upset Louie.
- Jim Norton as Jim. One of Louie's poker buddies and close friends.
- Chris Rock as himself. He appears in various episodes playing himself as a friend and confidant of Louie. He spreads the news about Louie being a potential David Letterman successor.
- Jerry Seinfeld as himself. Seinfeld portrays a fictionalized version of himself who is a rival to Louie. Seinfeld first appeared in "Late Show Part 3" as another potential replacement for David Letterman. He later appears in "Model", where he invites Louie to open for him at a heart disease research benefit in The Hamptons, but he hasn't warned Louie about the atmosphere and Louie ends up being severely humiliated as a result; he later arranges for a lawyer to help out Louie when a post-appearance tryst goes awry.
- Sarah Silverman as herself. Another friend of Louie that dates back to their days starting out as comedians in the 1980s.

=== Guest stars ===
Season 1

- Chelsea Peretti as a woman who goes on a date with Louie in the first episode, "Pilot".
- Matthew Broderick as himself. He is directing a remake of The Godfather, and casts Louie as a police officer but ultimately is stymied by Louie's utter incompetence as an actor. From the episode "Heckler/Cop Movie".
- Bobby Cannavale as Chris. A personal trainer whose child attends the same school as Louie's children. He attempts to get Louie into shape, but ends up driving Louie to having a near-fatal heart attack. He appears in "So Old/Playdate" and "Gym".
- Ricky Gervais as Dr. Ben Mitchell, Louie's doctor, who is a sadistic practical joker but considers himself a friend to Louie nonetheless. His death is vaguely implied in Season 4. Gervais appears in "Dr. Ben/Nick" and "Gym".
- Megan Hilty as a heckler in the episode "Heckler/Cop Movie".
- David Patrick Kelly as Louie's therapist, who finds him boring and doesn't listen to him. Louie's psychologist appears in "Double Date/Mom" and "So Old/Playdate".
- Tom Noonan as Dr. Haveford. A mysterious doctor brought in by Louie's Catholic school as a child who graphically describes Jesus Christ's crucifixion. He appears in the episode "God.”
- Stephen Root as Dr. Hepa. A dentophobic dentist who, it is strongly implied, orally rapes a sedated Louie. He appears in "Dentist/Tarese".

Season 2

- F. Murray Abraham as Jonathan. A mysterious swinger from New Jersey in the episode "New Jersey/Airport".
- Dane Cook as himself. Cook plays a fictionalized version of himself in the episode "Oh Louie/Tickets". Louie meets with him and they wind up addressing a silent feud inspired by real life as to whether or not Dane plagiarized his jokes.
- Joan Rivers as herself. Louie wanders into one of her shows, and later goes up to her room in the hotel, where she speaks to him about her career before they sleep together. She appears in the second-season episode "Joan".
- Eunice Anderson as Louie's great-aunt Ellen, whom he visits with his two daughters in the episode "Country Drive".
- Bob Saget as himself. He plays the "best friend" role of a stereotypical sitcom about Louie, as a parody of the short-lived show Lucky Louie. He appears in the episode "Oh Louie/Tickets".
- Doug Stanhope as Eddie, an old friend of Louie's and fellow comedian. After 20 years' absence, he and Louie reconnect, where Eddie reveals how he is planning to commit suicide. He appears in the episode "Eddie".
- Keni Thomas as himself. A country musician who joins Louie on a USO tour in Afghanistan.

Season 3

- Gaby Hoffmann as April, Louie's girlfriend, with whom he is trying reluctantly to break up. She appears in the first episode of the season.
- F. Murray Abraham as Excelsior Szekely, Louie's Mexican uncle, who meets with him at a tea room to order Louie to go meet his estranged father. Abraham appears in the episode "Dad".
- Maria Bamford as Maria. A friend of Louie's and fellow comic. After a sexual encounter, both she and Louie contract crabs. She appears in "Daddy's Girlfriend" and "Ikea/Piano Lesson".
- Jay Leno as himself. He appears in the "Late Show" arc when Louie appears on his show. He interviews Louie, and later on when Louie is offered the job of David Letterman's successor, he calls Louie and congratulates him and gives him advice.
- Melissa Leo as Laurie Brent. A friend of a fellow comic of Louie's who is at a dinner party Louie attends. They are not compatible at first, but then later they have a conversation in Laurie's truck where she pleasures him and demands he reciprocates. Leo won a Primetime Emmy Award for Outstanding Guest Actress in a Comedy Series for her performance as Laurie. She appears in the episode "Telling Jokes/Set Up".
- David Lynch as Jack Dall. A friend of the head of CBS and notable television producer. He is a brash and tough leader assigned to help coach Louie to become the next host of the Late Show. He succeeds in taking Louie from a gruff comedian to a capably suited late night show host. He appears in the "Late Show" arc. C.K. said that Ben Gazzara was the first person considered for the role, but he died the same day they considered casting him. Other performers considered included Jerry Lewis, Al Pacino, Woody Allen, and Martin Scorsese until it was finally settled that David Lynch would play Dall.
- Marc Maron as himself. An old friend of Louie's whom he hasn't spoken to in years for some unknown reason. He goes to Maron's apartment and tries to apologize, only to have Maron tell him that he came over years before and said exactly the same thing.
- Garry Marshall as Lars Tardigan. The head of CBS. He first offers Louie the role of replacing David Letterman on The Late Show.
- Amy Poehler as Debbie, Louie's sister, who tries to convince him to come spend New Year's with her and the family in Mexico. She appears in the third-season finale, “New Year's Eve".
- Parker Posey as Liz, an eccentric woman who works at a bookstore in New York. Louie falls in love with her, but loses touch and spends the rest of the season trying to find her again. She appears in the two-part "Daddy's Girlfriend" episode and the third-season finale, "New Year's Eve", dying of cancer in the latter episode.
- Paul Rudd as himself. He is interviewed by Louie on his trial talk show. He appears in "Late Show Part 3".
- Susan Sarandon as herself. She is interviewed by Louie on his trial talk show. She appears in "Late Show Part 3".
- Chloë Sevigny as Jeanie, Liz's replacement at the bookstore. She obsessively helps Louie in trying to find Liz, having some sort of sexual fixation with the situation, and then leaves.
- Robin Williams as Robin. When Barney, a comedy club proprietor, dies, Robin and Louie encounter each other at Barney's funeral, which no one else attended. They meet by chance later at a diner. They mention their mutual dislike of Barney, and go to a strip club that Barney used to frequent. They promise each other that whoever dies first, the other will attend their funeral. He appears in the episode "Barney/Never".

Season 4

- F. Murray Abraham appears as Louie's father in "In the Woods".
- Sarah Baker as Vanessa. A waitress at the Comedy Cellar who strikes up a friendship with Louie, but cannot accept that he likes her, as she is overweight. She appears in "So Did the Fat Lady".
- Eszter Balint as Amia. Evanka's non-English speaking niece whom Louie is trying to court. She appears in the six-part "Elevator" episodes.
- Ellen Burstyn as Evanka. A neighbor of Louie who gets stuck in an elevator in the building, and is assisted by Louie. She tells Louie that in her youth, she used to be part of a family comedy revue that would entertain Hungarian troops during the war. She appears in the six-part "Elevator" episodes.
- Devin Druid as young Louie. He appears in the two-part episode "In the Woods".
- Victor Garber as Louie's lawyer. He is a friend of Jerry Seinfeld and represents Louie when he accidentally punches and badly injures an attractive young blonde woman because she was tickling him. He appears in the episode "Model".
- Charles Grodin as Dr. Bigelow. A doctor in Louie's building who has complete disregard for Louie's back problems, instead preferring "interesting diseases" such as blood illnesses. He becomes Louie's doctor after it is implied that Dr. Ben died. He appears in multiple episodes in the season, giving Louie advice on appreciating his life and bluntly noting how boring a person he is.
- Jeremy Renner as Jeff Davis. Young Louie's drug dealer, who offers him weed in exchange for scales Louie stole from his school. He appears in "In the Woods".
- Yvonne Strahovski as Blake. A wealthy socialite and supermodel who takes Louie back to her home after his ill-fated opening at the benefit. She falls in love with Louie, but after tickling him, he accidentally punches her, thus blinding her and leaving Louie to pay her $5,000 per month in damages for the rest of his life or face jail time.
- Skipp Sudduth as Mr. Hoffman, young Louie's science teacher. He appears in "In the Woods".

Season 5

- Celia Keenan-Bolger as Julianne in "Potluck". She is a pregnant surrogate of the lesbian couple whose potluck dinner Louie goes to. She and Louie have sex, but as they do, her water breaks.
- Judy Gold as Marina in "Potluck", one of the women for whom Julianne is a surrogate, who is enraged that he "ruins" her via the untimely sex.
- Michael Rapaport as Lenny in "Cop Story", a police officer and ex-boyfriend of Louie's sister who forcefully tries to reconnect with Louie.
- Jim Florentine as Kenny in "The Road Part 2", as Louie's warmup act, whom we he begrudgingly has to share an apartment with for a week.

In addition to these guest stars, several notable comedians have appeared in smaller roles, including Chris Gethard, Todd Glass, Ted Alexandro, Amir Blumenfeld, Eddie Brill, Joe DeRosa, Vernon Chatman, Artie Lange, Godfrey, Chelsea Peretti, J. B. Smoove, Dave Attell, Michael Cera, John Lithgow, Big Jay Oakerson, and Steven Wright. Opie and Anthony and Amy Schumer have had voice-only guest appearances.

== Production ==
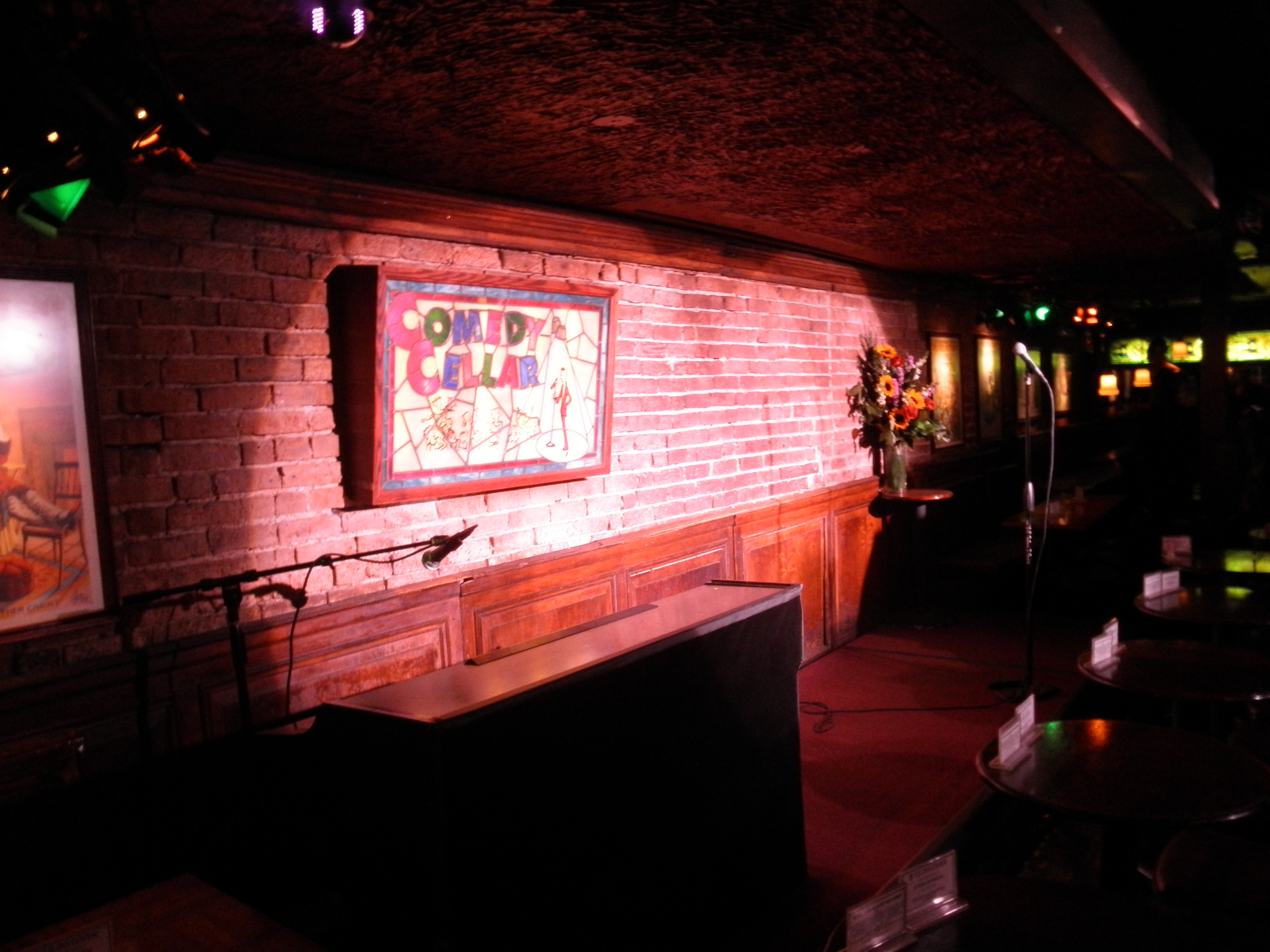
The stage of the Comedy Cellar, which is often shown on the series.

Rather than accepting a bigger-budget production deal with a larger network, C.K. accepted the modest offer of $200,000 (covering his own fee as well as production costs) to do a pilot with FX, since FX allowed him full creative control. The show is shot on a Red camera setup, and C.K. edits many of the episodes on his personal MacBook Pro. In addition to starring, C.K. serves as the show's sole writer and director, an unusual combination in American TV production. Referring to John Landgraf, who convinced C.K. to accept a deal with FX, C.K. said:

He had a very loose idea of what he wanted. I said, "Let me shoot a pilot and you don't have anything to do with it. I won't even pitch you the idea or show you the script or show you the footage or show you the casting. Just wire me the money and let me do the show." And he was willing to do that. One of the reasons it was done that way was he only gave me $200,000 for the thing all in. Since I was able to prove this was a way to do it and they liked what they got, I was able to keep doing it that way.

Louis C.K. directed, cast, and edited the first episode of the show with a budget of $250,000, provided by FX. In the second season, the budget was increased to $300,000 per episode.

Production began in November 2009. C.K. said of his show, "It's very vignette-y. It's very vérité. All those French words. I use 'em all." Pamela Adlon, who had starred in C.K.'s prior semi-autobiographical HBO sitcom Lucky Louie, served as a consulting producer of the series. Adlon and C.K. would later create another semi-autobiographical comedy-drama TV series on FX, Better Things, starring Adlon.

For the third season, C.K. announced that he would be handing off some editing duties to longtime Woody Allen collaborator Susan E. Morse.

Steven Wright joined the series in the fourth season as a consulting producer. C.K. and Wright became friends when Wright was visiting Manhattan and C.K. asked him to consult for the series. Wright said regarding his role, "I'm like a sounding board for the stories ... He bounces ideas off of me, like what could happen during different episodes, and I give him my opinion. I'll go to the set when they’re shooting. I'll watch it and give him my opinion on whatever was happening and how it went, whether it was funny or not. Then I'll go to editing and watch while he edits it and give him my opinion on changes and cuts and perversions and everything."

In a 2013 interview with The New York Times, C.K. mentioned various influences for the show, which include Allen, Larry David, Jerry Seinfeld, Garry Shandling and John Waters.

== Critical reception ==
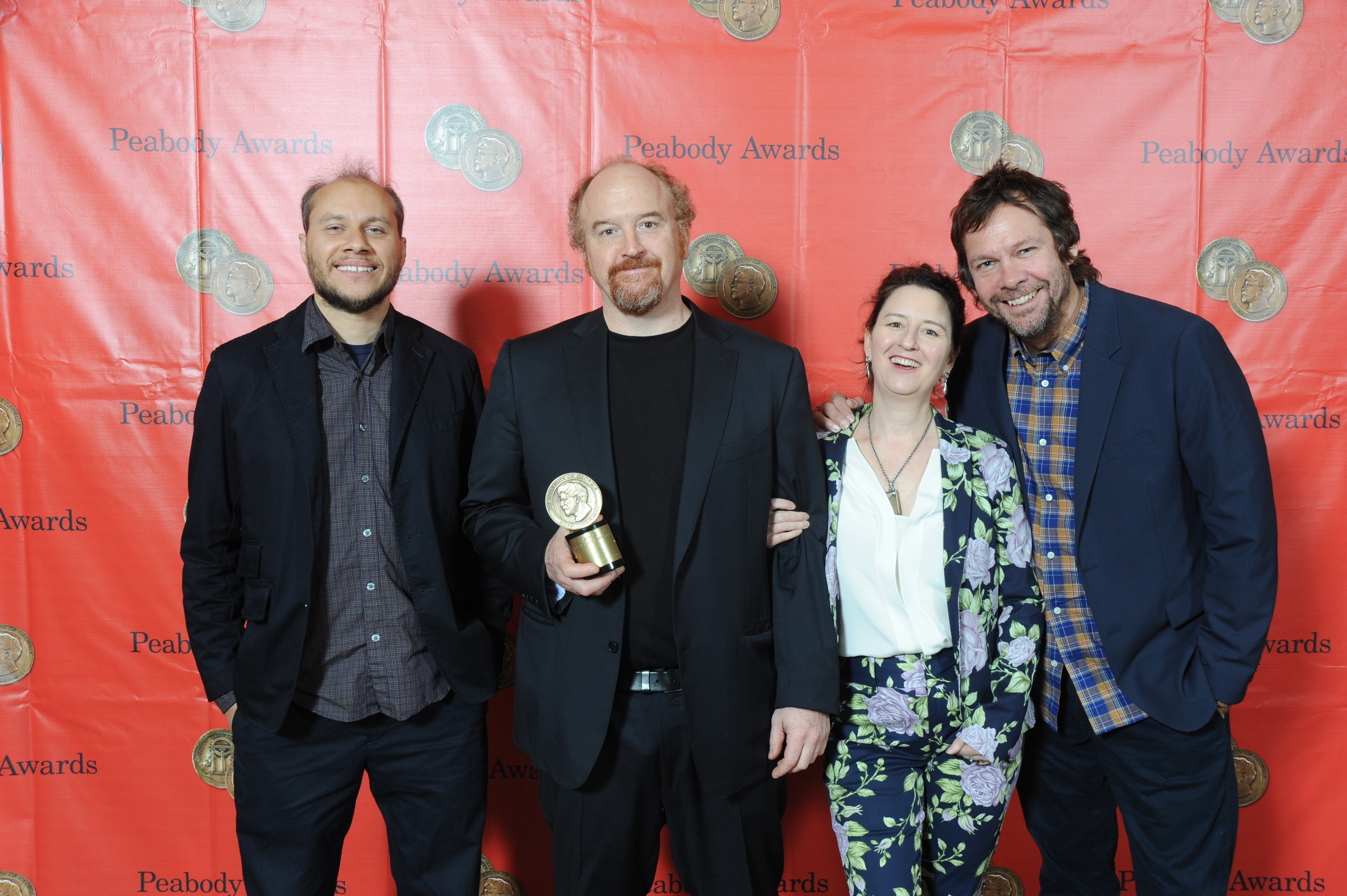
Vernon Chatman, Louis C.K, M. Blair Breard, and Dave Becky, the crew of Louie, present their Peabody Award.

Louie has received acclaim from critics. The stand-up segments received strong praise, as did the show's perceived "indie film" style, with some likening the show to the work of Woody Allen. Criticisms largely centered on the pacing and low-key delivery of the show's jokes, which often include long setups compared to the rapid-fire punchlines of a traditional sitcom.

Of the "top TV" lists tracked by Metacritic, Louie appeared on nine of 28 in 2010 and 22 of 39 in 2011, the latter of which includes three lists where the show was ranked 1st. On Metacritic, the first season scored 69 out of 100, based on 20 reviews. The second season scored 90 out of 100 on Metacritic, indicating "universal acclaim", based on 7 reviews. The third season received critical acclaim, scoring 94 out of 100 on Metacritic, based on 16 reviews. The fourth season also received critical acclaim, scoring 93 out of 100 on Metacritic, based on 30 reviews. The fifth season received acclaim as well, scoring 91 out of 100 on Metacritic, based on 20 reviews.

Television critics Alan Sepinwall and Matt Zoller Seitz ranked Louie as the 18th best American television show of all time in their book titled TV (The Book), stating that unlike other sitcoms which kept their tone and format the same throughout their respective runs, the series "morphed from week to week, episode to episode, sometimes minute to minute. In doing so, it translated the thought-processes of stand-up comedy into cinematic terms, and in a way that was new to commercial television."

Louie has an average rating of 93% on Rotten Tomatoes.

== Home media ==
20th Century Fox Home Entertainment released Season 1 on DVD and Blu-ray Disc in Region 1 on June 21, 2011. Season 2 was released on DVD and Blu-ray Disc in Region 1 on June 19, 2012. Seasons 3, 4, and 5 were exclusively released on DVD via Amazon.com's manufacture on demand program.

Season	Episodes	Release date	Bonus features
The Complete First Season	13	June 21, 2011	Five deleted/extended scenes with introductions by Louis C.K.; Fox Movie Channel Presents: Louie – Writer's Draft; Commentary on 11 episodes by Louis C.K.
The Complete Second Season	13	June 19, 2012	Fox Movie Channel Presents: World Premiere Louie Season 2; Commentary on 5 episodes by Louis C.K.
