= Marcel Simon =

Marcel Simon may refer to:

- Marcel Simon (actor) (1872–1958), Belgian actor
- Marcel Simon (historian) (1907–1986), French religious historian

== See also ==
- Marcel Simoneau (born 1978), Canadian film actor, writer, and director
