= Ms. Pat Settles It =

American reality comedy court show

- Genre: Arbitration-based reality court comedy show
- Directed by: Gary Shaffer
- Presented by: Patricia "Ms. Pat" Williams
- Starring: Additional below
- Country of origin: United States
- Original language: English
- No. of seasons: 3
- No. of episodes: 60

Production
- Executive producers: Ms. Pat; SallyAnn Salsano; Dave Hamilton; Ebony McClain; Frank Miccolis; Tiffany Lea Williams; Angela Aguilera; Kelly Gould; Ashley Taylor
- Producers: Peter Aronson; Jordan E. Cooper; Candace Daniels; Ravynne Staine
- Editors: Alexander Bliss; David Coppola; Teki Cruickshank; Charles Handy; Timothy Kelley; Derek Kind; Robin Koethcke; Thomas Martin; Charlie Newton; Kasia Sparks
- Production companies: 495 Productions; Georgia Media; BET Original Productions; Ms. Pat Productions

Original release
- Network: BET
- Release: October 18, 2023 – present

Ms. Pat Settles It is an American arbitration-based reality court comedy show hosted by Ms. Pat. The series premiered on October 18, 2023, on BET.

On April 11, 2024, the series was renewed for a second season which premiered on July 31, 2024.

On June 5, 2025, the series was renewed for a third season which premiered on November 4, 2025

== Cast ==
=== Main ===
- Patricia "Ms. Pat" Williams as herself

=== Bailiff ===
- Kourtlyn Wiggins (season 1–2)
- Calimar (season 3–present)

=== Jury ===
- Jasmine Luv (season 1)
- Chris Spangle (Note: Credited as White Boy Chris) (season 1–2)
- Ray J (season 1–2)
- Carmen Barton
- Garrianna P. Lee (season 1)
- Haha Davis (season 1)
- Jordan E. Cooper (season 1)
- Mona Love (season 1)
- DeRay Davis
- DC Curry (season 1)
- Tamar Braxton (season 2)
- Karlous Miller (season 2–present)
- Ts Madison (season 2)
- Jasmin Brown (season 3–present)
- Safaree Samuels (season 3–present)
- NeNe Leakes (season 3–present)
- Navv Greene (season 3–present)

== Episodes ==
Season	Episodes		Originally released	
Season	Episodes		First released	Last released
1	20	15	October 18, 2023	December 20, 2023
1	20	5	May 29, 2024	June 26, 2024
2	20	10	July 31, 2024	October 2, 2024
2	20	10	April 30, 2025	July 2, 2025
3	20	10	November 4, 2025	December 16, 2025
3	20	10	June 30, 2026	September 1, 2026

=== Season 1 (2023–24) ===
No. overall	No. in season	Title	Original release date
Part 1
1	1	"From Romance to Robbery"	October 18, 2023
Judge Ms. Pat settles cases that include exes disputing over a missing transmission with an uncle in the middle, a reneged trade between foul-mouthed church friends, and a curious case of dognapping. Episode 1 cases: Case: Braden v. Ford: Romance to Robbery; Jury: Jasmine Luv, Chris Spangle, Ray J, Carmen Barton; Plaintiff: Zaquanna Braden; Defendant: Gregory Ford; Defendant Witness: Reuben Grisham; Verdict: Case thrown out for $0; Case: Who v. Hayes: The Canine Custody Battle; Jury: Garrianna P. Lee, Ray J, Haha Davis, Carmen Barton; Plaintiff: Eric Who; Plaintiff Witness: Audrey Riley Williams; Defendant: Kijabe Hayes; Verdict: Ruling in favor of plaintiff for return of his dog Louie; Case: Hornes v. Wiggins: Cussed Out Over a Cloud Couch; Jury: Jasmine Luv, Chris Spangle, Ray J, Carmen Barton; Plaintiff: Charleetra Hornes; Defendant: Jeanine Wiggins; Verdict: Ruling in favor of plaintiff for $2000
2	2	"Trippin' Over Trippin'"	October 18, 2023
Judge Ms. Pat settles cases that feature a wig job gone wrong when one client goes from Farrah Fawcett to Joe Dirt, a boss tripping over tips after his employee refuses to cough up extra dough, and exes debating. Episode 2 cases: Case: Mitchell v. Wilson: Butchered Birthday Wig; Jury: Garrianna P. Lee, Jordan E. Cooper, Haha Davis, Carmen Barton; Plaintiff: Tomeka Mitchell; Defendant: Tonia Wilson; Verdict: Ruling in favor of defendant for $100; Case: Glover v. Abrams: Don't Catfish My Cash; Jury: Jasmine Luv, Chris Spangle, Ray J, Carmen Barton; Plaintiff: Romeo Glover; Defendant: Lanier Abrams; Verdict: Ruling in favor of plaintiff for $2250; Case: Pruitt v. Cunningham: Trippin' Over Tippin; Jury: Jasmine Luv, Chris Spangle, Ray J, Carmen Barton; Plaintiff: Oscar Pruitt; Defendant: Abanyeh "AC" Cunningham; Verdict: Ruling in favor of defendant for $1500
3	3	"Girls Trip No Dudes Allowed"	October 25, 2023
Judge Ms. Pat settles cases that include a disagreement between besties over limo rides & tamale lies, a broken girls trip NDA and taking one for the team and a busted up family heirloom. Episode 3 cases: Case: Majett v. Garci: 'Banged' Up Bachelorette; Jury: Mona Love, DeRay Davis, DC Curry, Carmen Barton; Plaintiff: Leon Majett; Defendant: Garcetta Garci; Defendant Witness: Sheena Miller; Verdict: Ruling in favor of plaintiff for $450; Case: Garrett v. Roberts: NDA: No D Allowed; Jury: Jasmine Luv, Chris Spangle, Ray J, Carmen Barton; Plaintiff: Stephanie Garrett; Defendant: Shawnda Roberts; Defendant Witness: John Hays; Verdict: Ruling in favor of plaintiff for $250; Case: Anderson v. Williams: Time's Up, Pay Up!; Jury: Jasmine Luv, Chris Spangle, Ray J, Carmen Barton; Plaintiff: Nia Anderson; Defendant: Jasmine Williams; Verdict: Ruling in favor of plaintiff for $150
4	4	"I Ain't God, I Don't Love You"	October 25, 2023
Judge Ms. Pat settles cases that features cousins whose cruise plans sunk, former friends fighting over a missing monkey…finger monkey and a mother & daughter's dispute over a phone bill way past due. Episode 4 cases: Case: Spaulding v. Pleasants: Find My Finger Monkey; Jury: Jasmine Luv, Chris Spangle, Ray J, Carmen Barton; Plaintiff: Tommy Spaulding; Defendant: Elwood Pleasants; Verdict: Ruling in favor of plaintiff for $1750; Case: Evans v. Hardy: Cruising for my Cash; Jury: Jasmine Luv, Chris Spangle, Ray J, Carmen Barton; Plaintiff: Allison Evans; Defendant: Sha'ree Hardy; Verdict: Ruling in favor of plaintiff for $3500; Case: Parker v. Parker: Disconnected by my Daughter; Jury: Jasmine Luv, Chris Spangle, Ray J, Carmen Barton; Plaintiff: Sharnissa Parker; Defendant: Sydnei Parker; Verdict: Awarded Mom & Daughter Spa Day
5	5	"Catfished and Carjacked"	November 1, 2023
Judge Ms. Pat settles cases that include a loan between friends turned carjacking that they WISH was a nightmare, a trespassing incident where a romp was caught on ring camera and a friend who wants her loan paid back. Episode 5 cases: Case: Calderon v. Lopez: Ring Camera Romp; Jury: Jasmine Luv, Chris Spangle, Ray J, Carmen Barton; Plaintiff: Karen Calderon; Defendant: Samantha Lopez; Verdict: Ruling in favor of plaintiff for $1000; Case: Nigel Mongerie v. Keenan Fisher: Catfished and Carjacked; Jury: Mona Love, DeRay Davis, DC Curry, Carmen Barton; Plaintiff: Nigel Mongerie; Defendant: Keenan Fisher; Verdict: Ruling in favor of plaintiff for $2500; Case: Nolen v. James: Where's My Mommy Makeover; Jury: Jasmine Luv, Chris Spangle, Ray J, Carmen Barton; Plaintiff: Rachal Nolen; Defendant: Bryan James; Verdict: Ruling in favor of plaintiff for $5000; Ms. Pat Donation: $2500 for defendant
6	6	"Body by Insurance Check"	November 1, 2023
Judge Ms. Pat settles cases that include unapproved dress alterations that removed breast breathing room, twins disputing over a rental property party, and a husband and wife on the brink of divorce after she stole his insurance money. Episode 6 cases: Case: Knighton v. Knighton: My Twin Ain't Twinning From Me; Jury: Garrianna P. Lee, Jordan E. Cooper, Haha Davis, Carmen Barton; Plaintiff: Travon Knighton; Defendant: Trayanna Knighton; Verdict: Ruling in favor of plaintiff for $254.92; Case: Brown v. Henderson: Small Boobs, Big Problems; Jury: Garrianna P. Lee, Ray J, Haha Davis, Carmen Barton; Plaintiff: Bee Brown; Defendant: Paris Henderson; Verdict: Ruling in favor of plaintiff for $761; Case: Bookman v. Bookman: Body $5K, Divorce Priceless; Jury: Garrianna P. Lee, Jordan E. Cooper, Haha Davis, Carmen Barton; Plaintiff: Kevin Bookman; Defendant: Tiffny Bookman; Verdict: Ruling in favor of plaintiff for $5000
7	7	"We Ain't Even Married"	November 8, 2023
Judge Ms. Pat settles cases that include blown off babysitting duties that ruined a sister's pasta & lobsta plans, a couple that loses engagement rings but never their love. Episode 7 cases: Case: Jones v. Rowell: Bed Friend; Jury: Jasmine Luv, Chris Spangle, Ray J, Carmen Barton; Plaintiff: Dynasty Jones; Defendant: Deprintice Rowell; Verdict: Ruling in favor of defendant: Does not have to pay; Case: Jones v. Peterson: Two Rings Don't Make a Right; Jury: Jasmine Luv, Chris Spangle, Ray J, Carmen Barton; Plaintiff: Harrison Jones; Plaintiff Witness: Nicole Ingram; Defendant: Nakara Peterson; Verdict: Ruling in favor of defendant for $0; Case: Andrews v. Snowden: Sneaker Stealin' Sibling; Jury: Jasmine Luv, Chris Spangle, Ray J, Carmen Barton; Plaintiff: Curstin Andrews; Plaintiff Witness: Kiesha Davis; Defendant: Tevin Snowden; Verdict: Awarded $1000 for family counseling
8	8	"Even God Can't Fix Ugly"	November 8, 2023
Judge Ms. Pat settles cases that include a niece suing her uncle for a pageant loan but he says they are MORE than even, a daughter suing her mother for a questionable car repossession and a little sis suing her big sis. Episode 8 cases: Case: Presley v. Taylor: Pageant King Payback; Jury: Jasmine Luv, Chris Spangle, Ray J, Carmen Barton; Plaintiff: Shantaya Presley; Defendant: "Uncle Bill" Taylor; Verdict: Ruling in favor of defendant for $0; Case: Funderburk v. Funderburk: Grand Theft Mama; Jury: Garrianna P. Lee, Ray J, Haha Davis, Carmen Barton; Plaintiff: Mya Funderburk; Defendant: Tamica Funderburk; Verdict: Ruling in favor of plaintiff for $3330 cost of rims; Case: Suggs v. Suggs: Big Sister, Big Mess; Jury: Jasmine Luv, Chris Spangle, Ray J, Carmen Barton; Plaintiff: Kendra Suggs; Defendant: Kayla Suggs; Verdict: Ruling in favor of plaintiff for $2300
9	9	"Poppin' Off Over Popped Bottles"	November 15, 2023
Judge Ms. Pat settles cases that include a son suing his mother, lifelong best friends disputing over rent money and a cousin who took back her bottle service birthday present. Episode 9 cases: Case: Brown v. Brown: Mama Wants to Party Too!; Jury: Mona Love, DeRay Davis, DC Curry, Carmen Barton; Plaintiff: Justin Brown; Defendant: Gail Brown; Verdict: Ruling in favor of defendant for $0; Case: Adams v. Pickett: Blood is Thicker than Liquor; Jury: Garrianna P. Lee, Ray J, Haha Davis, Carmen Barton; Plaintiff: Anissa Adams; Defendant: Christina Pickett; Verdict: Ruling in favor of plaintiff for $1000; Case: Hall v. McKeever: Yo Bro, Life Ain't Free; Jury: Jasmine Luv, Chris Spangle, Ray J, Carmen Barton; Plaintiff: Brandon Hall; Defendant: Joshua McKeever; Verdict: Ruling in favor of plaintiff for $860
10	10	"Catering Job Catastrophe"	November 15, 2023
Judge Ms. Pat settles cases that include a hairy situation between salon owner and stylist, a woman trying to hook her friend up with a catering job and a poor paint job that dried up a friendship. Episode 10 cases: Case: Doss v. Allison: Curl Up and Dye, My Friend; Jury: Garrianna P. Lee, Ray J, Haha Davis, Carmen Barton; Plaintiff: Marcus Doss; Defendant: Terrill Allison; Verdict: Ruling in favor of plaintiff for $50; Case: Metayer v. Boyer: Party Foul Food; Jury: Mona Love, DeRay Davis, DC Curry, Carmen Barton; Plaintiff: Khadija Metayer; Defendant: Toya Boyer; Verdict: Ruling in favor of defendant for $0; Case: Tyler v. Johnson: 99 Problems and a Paint Job is 1; Jury: Mona Love, DeRay Davis, DC Curry, Carmen Barton; Plaintiff: Dejan Tyler; Defendant: Patrick Johnson; Verdict: Ruling in favor of defendant for $0
11	11	"Vacay For Babay?"	November 22, 2023
Judge Ms. Pat settles cases that include friends turned foes over a glam job, cousins disputing over a slip and fall situation and friends disputing over vacation payment in the form of a baby. Episode 11 cases: Case: Boyd v. Wagstaff: Friends Through Slick and Thin; Jury: Mona Love, DeRay Davis, DC Curry, Carmen Barton; Plaintiff: Jasmine Boyd; Defendant: Raven Wagstaff; Verdict: Ruling in favor of: plaintiff for $350; defendant for $1000; Case: Ramsey v. Larocque; Jury: Mona Love, DeRay Davis, DC Curry, Carmen Barton; Plaintiff: Ron Ramsey; Defendant: Jovan Larocque; Defendant Witness: Tyson Marlow; Verdict: Ruling in favor of plaintiff for $200; Case: Lee v. Lamar: Knock Up, Pay Up; Jury: Garrianna P. Lee, Ray J, Haha Davis, Carmen Barton; Plaintiff: Tyrice Lee; Defendant: Ashley Lamar; Verdict: Ruling in favor of plaintiff for $2,702.98
12	12	"Livin' Aint Free"	November 29, 2023
Judge Ms. Pat settles cases that include an employee working for free but the boss says she owes her, a mentor looking for his rent money but needs to clean up a messy lease agreement, and two sisters battle. Episode 12 cases: Case: Pierce v. Adame: Your Ugly Pottery Doesn't Pay; Jury: Mona Love, DeRay Davis, DC Curry, Carmen Barton; Plaintiff: Decembre Pierce; Defendant: Jacky Adame; Verdict: Ruling in favor of defendant for $0; Case: Smith v. Lyles: Roaches for Rent; Jury: Jasmine Luv, Chris Spangle, Ray J, Carmen Barton; Plaintiff: Kenneth Smith; Defendant: Chris Lyles; Verdict: Ruling in favor of defendant for $0; Case: Williams v. Harris: Bye Bye Bling; Jury: Garrianna P. Lee, Ray J, Haha Davis, Carmen Barton; Plaintiff: Patricia Williams; Defendant: Crystal Harris; Verdict: Ruling in favor of defendant for $0; Awarded: $100 for burgers
13	13	"Don't Change Your Tune Now!"	December 6, 2023
Judge Ms. Pat settles cases that include an ex-husband whose ex-wife pulled a $5k fast one for her dream car, a mother suing her daughter over tax return money and a music manager promised a payback after her artist has changed. Episode 13 cases: Case: Jackson v. Wiggins: The Single Never Dropped; Jury: Mona Love, DeRay Davis, DC Curry, Carmen Barton; Plaintiff: Annie Jackson; Defendant: Tristan "T Red" Wiggins; Verdict: Ruling in favor of plaintiff for $1000; Case: Harden v. Harden: My Ex Took Me for a Ride; Jury: Mona Love, DeRay Davis, DC Curry, Carmen Barton; Plaintiff: Beau Harden; Defendant: Domenique Harden; Verdict: Ruling in favor of plaintiff for $5000; Case: Webb v. Walton: Mama Wants her Tax Return; Jury: Garrianna P. Lee, Jordan E. Cooper, Haha Davis, Carmen Barton; Plaintiff: Sylvia Webb; Defendant: Kayla Walton; Verdict: Ruling in favor of plaintiff for $3000
14	14	"Synthetic Shenanigans"	December 13, 2023
Judge Ms. Pat settles cases that include a friendship that came to a screeching halt at a reggae fest, exes who are at war over synthetic wigs and friends brawling over a bad boutique review. Episode 14 cases: Case: Jacobs v. Smith: Crashing the Jamaica Trip; Jury: Mona Love, DeRay Davis, DC Curry, Carmen Barton; Plaintiff: Delita Jacobs; Defendant: Eve Smith; Verdict: Ruling in favor of plaintiff for $4500; Case: Thomas v. Thomas: Synthetic Shenanigans; Jury: Jasmine Luv, Chris Spangle, Ray J, Carmen Barton; Plaintiff: Kelvin Thomas; Defendant: Wyshika Thomas; Verdict: Ruling in favor of defendant for $0; Case: Bass v. Flagler: You Stained My Reputation; Jury: Garrianna P. Lee, Jordan E. Cooper, Haha Davis, Carmen Barton; Plaintiff: Tiffany Bass; Defendant: Damienne Flagler; Verdict: Ruling in favor of plaintiff for $300
15	15	"You A Nasty Roomie!"	December 20, 2023
Judge Ms. Pat settles cases that include a roommate from hell and one nasty razor, an engaged couple whose trust issues got taken out on a car and a sister-in-law whose house-sitting caused a tsunami setback. Episode 15 cases: Case: Jones v. Brigham: Nasty Roommate and Nastier Attitude; Jury: Mona Love, DeRay Davis, DC Curry, Carmen Barton; Plaintiff: Tiesia Jones; Defendant: Latasha Brigham; Verdict: Ruling in favor of plaintiff for $2000; Case: Cox v. Pratt: Cheat Around and Find Out; Jury: Mona Love, DeRay Davis, DC Curry, Carmen Barton; Plaintiff: Berry Cox; Defendant: Torri Pratt; Verdict: Ruling in favor of plaintiff for $1200; Case: Chaplin v. Lai Hing: Hurricane House Sitter; Jury: Mona Love, DeRay Davis, DC Curry, Carmen Barton; Plaintiff: Stacy Chaplin; Plaintiff Witness: Janee McKenzie (Plaintiff's Girlfriend); Defendant: Leah Lai Hing; Verdict: Ruling in favor of plaintiff for $3800
Part 2
16	16	"Shady Sister Swipe"	May 29, 2024
Judge Ms. Pat settles cases that include a roommate more focused on romance than bromance, a little sister stiffed by her credit card swiping big sis and a couple clashing over a lost social media opportunity. Episode 16 cases: Case: Flores v. Destime: Friends with No Benefits; Jury: Garrianna P. Lee, Jordan E. Cooper, Haha Davis, Carmen Barton; Plaintiff: Rich Flores; Defendant: Rego Destime; Verdict: Ruling in favor of defendant for $0; Case: Beckham v. Clements: Shady Sister Swipe; Jury: Jasmine Luv, Chris Spangle, Ray J, Carmen Barton; Plaintiff: Domonique Beckham; Defendant: Jami Clements; Verdict: Ruling in favor of plaintiff for $3020; Case: Cox v. Briole: A Thin Line Between Love & Likes; Jury: Mona Love, DeRay Davis, DC Curry, Carmen Barton; Plaintiff: Moses Cox; Plaintiff Witness: Jonathan Moss; Defendant: Kim Briole; Verdict: Ruling in favor of defendant for $0
17	17	"No Benjamins, No Beats"	June 5, 2024
Judge Ms. Pat settles cases that include a social media standoff over an unpaid wig install, a music video payment remix and one sister who refuses to pay the other for a loan because she feels like she's loaded! Episode 17 cases: Case: Miller v. Williams: Posts Don't Pay Bills; Jury: Mona Love, DeRay Davis, DC Curry, Carmen Barton; Plaintiff: Ja-Rey Miller; Defendant: Renee Williams; Verdict: Ruling in favor of defendant for $0; Case: Walker v. Session: Sis, My Money Ain't Y0ur Money; Jury: Garrianna P. Lee, Ray J, Haha Davis, Carmen Barton; Plaintiff: Kiaya Walker; Defendant: Kianna Session; Verdict: Ruling in favor of plaintiff for $2,500; Case: Davis v. Brown: No Benjamins, No Beats; Jury: Garrianna P. Lee, Jordan E. Cooper, Haha Davis, Carmen Barton; Plaintiff: Nejcion Davis; Defendant: Tre Prada Brown; Verdict: Ruling in favor of plaintiff for music video
18	18	"When Love Gives You Lemons"	June 12, 2024
Judge Ms. Pat settles cases that include a business exchange that turned into a money pit, exes gone sour over a lemonade business and cousins conflicting over a crashed car. Episode 18 cases: Case: Greene vs. Frucel: Mentor No More; Jury: Mona Love, DeRay Davis, DC Curry, Carmen Barton; Plaintiff: Iasha Greene; Defendant: Taylor Frucel; Verdict: Ruling in favor of defendant for $0; Case: Hughes v. Rawls: When Love Gives you Lemons; Jury: Mona Love, DeRay Davis, DC Curry, Carmen Barton; Plaintiff: Ayeesah Hughes; Defendant: LaToya Rawls; Verdict: Ruling in favor of plaintiff for $3,752; Case: Strange v. Land: Hit and Run; Jury: Mona Love, DeRay Davis, DC Curry, Carmen Barton; Plaintiff: Jamal Strange; Defendant: Kyle Land; Verdict: Ruling in favor of plaintiff for $500
19	19	"Take The Man, Leave The Bags"	June 19, 2024
Judge Ms Pat settles cases that include a situationship turned sour, a mother suing her daughter over a cruise bill and ex-besties who are fighting over gifts, not the guy. Episode 19 cases: Case: Rivera v. Stewart: Brotherly Love Triangle; Jury: Mona Love, DeRay Davis, DC Curry, Carmen Barton; Plaintiff: Gizelle Rivera; Plaintiff Witness: Travis Stewart; Defendant: Cameron Stewart; Verdict: Ruling in favor of defendant for $0; Case: Jones v. Morrison: Too Old to Drink for Free; Jury: Garrianna P. Lee, Ray J, Haha Davis, Carmen Barton; Plaintiff: Andrea Jones; Defendant: Tori Morrison; Defendant Witness: Tia Morrison; Verdict: Ruling in favor of plaintiff for $1,850; Case: Crenshaw v. Favors: She Stole My Man and My Stuff; Jury: Mona Love, DeRay Davis, DC Curry, Carmen Barton; Plaintiff: Nikki Crenshaw; Defendant: Kayla Favors; Defendant Witness: Jamal Moreland; Verdict: Ruling in favor of plaintiff for $2,000
20	20	"A Hairy Situation"	June 26, 2024
Cases that include a hairy services exchange, former friends with benefits fighting over free massages and an ex-girlfriend who wants her ex-boyfriend to kick rocks after he returns her kicks. Episode 20 cases: Case: Marie v. Jermany: Never Lose Your Edge; Jury: Mona Love, DeRay Davis, DC Curry, Carmen Barton; Plaintiff: Lotto Marie; Defendant: Jennifer Jermany; Verdict: Ruling in favor of defendant for $0; Case: Conrod v. Joshway: Un-Happy Endings; Jury: Garrianna P. Lee, Ray J, Haha Davis, Carmen Barton; Plaintiff: Brittany Conrod; Defendant: Reggie Joshway; Verdict: Ruling in favor of plaintiff for $420; Case: Wilson v. Edwards: The Sneaker Snatcher; Jury: Mona Love, DeRay Davis, DC Curry, Carmen Barton; Plaintiff: Alexiah Wilson; Defendant: Kenderrick Edwards; Verdict: Ruling in favor of plaintiff for return of shoes or $1,300

=== Season 2 (2024–25) ===
No. overall	No. in season	Title	Original release date
Part 1
21	1	"These Clothes Are Real... Real Fake"	July 31, 2024
Judge Ms. Pat settles three cases that include former friends fighting over fake fashion, a social media show turned sour, and a couple who wants to make it official after they solve their loan dispute. Episode 1 cases: Case: Willis v. McClain: Your Fake Fashion is Trash; Jury: Karlous Miller, Tamar Braxton, DeRay Davis, Carmen Barton; Plaintiff: Marco Willis; Defendant: Hershee McClain; Verdict: Ruling in favor of plaintiff for $3500; Case: Sloan v. Ware: You Better Insta-ntly Pay Me; Jury: Ts Madison, Chris Spangle, Ray J, Carmen Barton; Plaintiff: George Sloan; Defendant: Travis Ware; Verdict: Ruling in favor of defendant for $0; Case: Petty v. Redmond: Honey, Where's My Loan Money; Jury: Karlous Miller, Tamar Braxton, DeRay Davis, Carmen Barton; Plaintiff: Carlos Petty; Defendant: Nagayla Redmond; Verdict: Ruling in favor of plaintiff for $5000 for honeymoon
22	2	"Sis, This Wedding Cake Is Wack"	August 7, 2024
Judge Ms. Pat settles three cases that include pals from the pen fighting over money owed for transcription work, exes in a delivery app dispute, and sisters whose relationship is a mess over a hot mess wedding cake. Episode 2 cases: Case: Sherrod v. Isreal: Uber Eatin' on My Dime; Jury: Karlous Miller, Tamar Braxton, DeRay Davis, Carmen Barton; Plaintiff: Cortez Sherrod; Defendant: Charles Isreal; Verdict: Ruling in favor of defendant who owes $0; Case: Coleman v. Davis: Suing Cellmates; Jury: Karlous Miller, Tamar Braxton, DeRay Davis, Carmen Barton; Plaintiff: Crystal Coleman; Defendant: Sheshe Davis; Verdict: Ruling in favor of defendant for $1000; Case: Montgomery v. Fletcher: Sis, Your Wedding Cake Was Whack!; Jury: Karlous Miller, Tamar Braxton, DeRay Davis, Carmen Barton; Plaintiff: Carol Montgomery; Defendant: April Fletcher; Verdict: Ruling in favor of plaintiff for $475
23	3	"Tinderoni Troubles"	August 14, 2024
Judge Ms. Pat settles three cases that include sisters suing their mom for a car loan, but mom says they got into two accidents in one day, a roommate situationship that ended after a week and cousins fighting over a busted up water heater. Episode 3 cases: Case: Leonard v. Martin: Two Cars and a Tinderoni; Jury: Karlous Miller, Tamar Braxton, DeRay Davis, Carmen Barton; Plaintiff: Taneisha & Aleisha Leonard; Defendant: Angela Martin; Verdict: Ruling in favor of defendant for $1000; Case: Wilhite v. Henry: You Kicked Me Out After a Week; Jury: Ts Madison, Chris Spangle, Ray J, Carmen Barton; Plaintiff: Jahna Wilhite; Defendant: Kaylo Henry; Verdict: Ruling in favor of plaintiff for $1125; Case: Ford v. Roland: You Broke My Water Heater!; Jury: Ts Madison, Chris Spangle, Ray J, Carmen Barton; Plaintiff: Alicia Ford; Defendant: Jeramy Roland; Verdict: Ruling in favor of: plaintiff for $1428; defendant for $1000 for car repairs
24	4	"Jealous Exes & Cracked Screens"	August 21, 2024
Judge Ms. Pat settles three cases that include besties who fell out over a turkey burger fall, a music video that was never shot because the talent looked like Kelly No-Roland and two jealous exes, & a broken cell phone. Episode 4 cases: Case: Hodges v. Hilton: Chair Breaking Burger; Jury: Ts Madison, Chris Spangle, Ray J, Carmen Barton; Plaintiff: Michelle Hodges; Defendant: Monika Hilton; Verdict: Ruling in favor of plaintiff for $200 in groceries; Case: Easley v. Collins: Hard No on Your Soft Look; Jury: Karlous Miller, Tamar Braxton, DeRay Davis, Carmen Barton; Plaintiff: Chris Easley; Defendant: Diona Collins; Verdict: Ruling in favor of nobody; Case: Robinson v. Edwards: Ex Got Jelly and Destroyed My Celly; Jury: Ts Madison, Chris Spangle, Ray J, Carmen Barton; Plaintiff: Kiera Robinson; Defendant: Dominique Edwards; Verdict: Ruling in favor of plaintiff for $499.50
25	5	"Cuz, You Botched My BBL"	August 28, 2024
Judge Ms. Pat settles three cases that include a botched BBL that left cousins beefing, friends fighting over a dog haircut gone wrong and sisters squabbling over money owed for rap career management. Episode 5 cases: Case: Nicklson v. Carson: My BBL Blows; Jury: Ts Madison, Chris Spangle, Ray J, Carmen Barton; Plaintiff: Trydarius Nicklson; Defendant: Kenya Carson; Verdict: Ruling in favor of defendant for $4600; Case: Estell v. Guinn: You Shaved My Dog Bald; Jury: Karlous Miller, Tamar Braxton, DeRay Davis, Carmen Barton; Plaintiff: Sharonda Estell; Defendant: Deja Guinn; Verdict: Ruling in favor of plaintiff for $741.99; Case: Evans v. Hood: No Rap Career Without Me; Jury: Ts Madison, Chris Spangle, Ray J, Carmen Barton; Plaintiff: Mesa Evans; Defendant: Jada Hood; Verdict: Ruling in favor of plaintiff for $460
26	6	"Drop the Mic & My Check"	September 4, 2024
Judge Ms. Pat settles three cases that include one bad balloon arch, a mum suing her spoiled son for stealing her credit card to buy himself a mic, and friends feuding over a Louis Vuitton slide that became a high-priced chew toy. Episode 6 cases: Case: McKinnie v. Matthews: Balloon Arch Enemies; Jury: Karlous Miller, Tamar Braxton, DeRay Davis, Carmen Barton; Plaintiff: Khadijah McKinnie; Defendant: Rainey Matthews; Verdict: Ruling in favor of defendant for $0; Case: Booker v. Long: Your Mic Check Bounced; Jury: Ts Madison, Chris Spangle, Ray J, Carmen Barton; Plaintiff: Bernadette Booker; Defendant: Nathan Long; Verdict: Ruling in favor of plaintiff for $3195; Case: Jones v. Brown: Your Dog Chews Shoes; Jury: Ts Madison, Chris Spangle, Ray J, Carmen Barton; Plaintiff: Lakesha Jones; Defendant: Dustin Brown; Verdict: Ruling in favor of plaintiff for $1026.63
27	7	"Scissors & Sabotage"	September 18, 2024
Episode 7 cases: Case: Mitchell v. Brown: You Dropped the Mic... And Your Mom?; Jury: Karlous Miller, Tamar Braxton, DeRay Davis, Carmen Barton; Plaintiff: Towana Mitchell; Defendant: Ceeluxx Brown; Verdict: Ruling in favor of plaintiff for $750; Case: Read v. Christian: My Friend is Too Cheap to Keep; Jury: Ts Madison, Chris Spangle, Ray J, Carmen Barton; Plaintiff: Coco Reed; Defendant: Victor Christian; Verdict: Ruling in favor of defendant for $0; Case: Harris v. Corley: Beauty Supply Heist; Jury: Ts Madison, Chris Spangle, Ray J, Carmen Barton; Plaintiff: Catherine Harris; Defendant: Eddy Corley; Verdict: Ruling in favor of plaintiff for $2500
28	8	"Pump the Brakes and Pay Me"	September 18, 2024
Episode 8 cases: Case: Shareef v. Shareef: Pump the Brakes, Bro; Jury: Ts Madison, Chris Spangle, Ray J, Carmen Barton; Plaintiff: Zakeemah Shareef; Defendant: Rashad Shareef; Defendant Witness: Hajid Shareef; Verdict: Ruling in favor of plaintiff for $5000; Case: Renaissance v. Degraff: You're Caked in Lies; Jury: Ts Madison, Chris Spangle, Ray J, Carmen Barton; Plaintiff: Token Renaissance; Defendant: Diamond Degraff; Verdict: Ruling in favor of defendant for $0; Case: Merritt v. Butler: Sis, You Bailed on my Birthday!; Jury: Karlous Miller, Tamar Braxton, DeRay Davis, Carmen Barton; Plaintiff: Sade Merritt; Defendant: Jasmine Butler; Verdict: Ruling in favor of plaintiff for $1450
29	9	"Drippin' And Dippin' Out On The Car Payment"	September 25, 2024
Episode 9 cases: Case: Brennen v. McClinton: No Way to the Vacay; Jury: Ts Madison, Chris Spangle, Ray J, Carmen Barton; Plaintiff: Byron Brennen; Defendant: Briasha McClinton; Verdict: Ruling in favor of plaintiff for $748.93; Case: Williams v. Goins: Too Late to Drake; Jury: Karlous Miller, Tamar Braxton, DeRay Davis, Carmen Barton; Plaintiff: Ayanna Williams; Defendant: Kiani Goins; Verdict: Ruling in favor of defendant for $0; Case: Mattox v. Campbell: You're Covered in Drip, But Can't Cover Our Car?; Jury: Ts Madison, Chris Spangle, Ray J, Carmen Barton; Plaintiffs: Debbie & Ben Mattox; Defendant: Willie Campbell; Verdict: Ruling in favor of plaintiff for $5000
30	10	"Slayed Faces, Fried Edges"	October 2, 2024
Episode 10 cases: Case: Jenkins v. Brown: Cuz, Pay for my Car; Jury: Ts Madison, Chris Spangle, Ray J, Carmen Barton; Plaintiff: Keyz Jenkins; Defendant: Pierre Brown; Verdict: Ruling in favor of defendant for $0; Case: Mobley v. Mobley: Photo Face-Off; Jury: Ts Madison, Chris Spangle, Ray J, Carmen Barton; Plaintiff: Vivian Mobley; Defendant: Lyz Mobley; Verdict: Ruling in favor of plaintiff for $225; Case: Green v. Pickett: You Lost My Locs; Jury: Karlous Miller, Tamar Braxton, DeRay Davis, Carmen Barton; Plaintiff: Brandi Green; Plaintiff Witness: Marquise Ellis; Defendant: Skyren Pickett; Verdict: Ruling in favor of defendant for $0
Part 2
31	11	"If We Ain't a Thing, Gimme Back My Ring!"	April 30, 2025
Episode 11 cases: Case: Weaver v. Haynes: Sis, You're a Straight-Up Wreck; Jury: Ts Madison, Chris Spangle, Ray J, Carmen Barton; Plaintiff: Taleiah Weaver; Plaintiff Witness: Wanda Weaver; Defendant: Precious Haynes; Verdict: Ruling in favor of plaintiff for $3000; Case: Ferdinand v. Tiquira: If Miami Ain't a Thing, Gimme My Ring; Jury: Ts Madison, Chris Spangle, Ray J, Carmen Barton; Plaintiff: Dale Ferdinand; Defendant: Mikkie Tiquira; Verdict: Ruling in favor of defendant; Case: McKinney v. Thomas: Sis Went Crazy with My Card; Jury: Chris Spangle, Tamar Braxton, DeRay Davis, Carmen Barton; Plaintiff: Shayla McKinney; Defendant: Whitney Thomas; Verdict: Ruling in favor of plaintiff for $2300
32	12	"Kicked out on Christmas"	May 7, 2025
Episode 12 cases: Case: Demory v. Demory: Credit Ruining Mama; Jury: Karlous Miller, Tamar Braxton, DeRay Davis, Carmen Barton; Plaintiff: Christamy Demory; Defendant: Tammy Demory; Verdict: Ruling in favor of plaintiff for $560.63; Case: Francis v. Williams: Float Me My Yacht Money!; Jury: Ts Madison, Chris Spangle, Ray J, Carmen Barton; Plaintiff: Leon Francis; Defendant: Tabatha Williams; Verdict: Ruling in favor of nobody; Case: Johnson v. Burgess: Beauty School Cop-Out; Jury: Ts Madison, Chris Spangle, Ray J, Carmen Barton; Plaintiff: Collin Johnson; Defendant: Shavonna Burgess; Verdict: Ruling in favor of defendant for $0
33	13	"Ghost Ridin' My Whip"	May 14, 2025
Episode 13 cases: Case: Moore v. Moore: Sis, I Want My Clothes Back; Jury: Ts Madison, Chris Spangle, Ray J, Carmen Barton; Plaintiff: Cortney Moore; Defendant: Crystal Moore; Verdict: Ruling in favor of defendant for $0; Case: Lampley v. Banks: You Cut My Wig, I Cut You Out of My Life; Jury: Ts Madison, Chris Spangle, Ray J, Carmen Barton; Plaintiff: Ariyanna Lampley; Defendant: Desirra Banks; Verdict: Ruling in favor of plaintiff for $1143.50; Case: McHeard v. Irvin: You Ghosted Me - With My Whip; Jury: Chris Spangle, Tamar Braxton, DeRay Davis, Carmen Barton; Plaintiff: Audrey McHeard; Defendant: Chris Irvin; Verdict: Ruling in favor of plaintiff for $5000
34	14	"Forget the Kisses, You Keyed My Car"	May 21, 2025
Episode 14 cases: Case: Carter v. Jessup: You Keyed My Car - Now Cough Up the Cash; Jury: Chris Spangle, Tamar Braxton, DeRay Davis, Carmen Barton; Plaintiff: Quinn Carter; Defendant: Charlotte Jessup; Verdict: Ruling in favor of plaintiff for $1953.80; Case: Holliday v. Greer: Hey You, Rent is Due; Jury: Ts Madison, Chris Spangle, Ray J, Carmen Barton; Plaintiff: Lashon Holliday; Defendant: Dominique Greer; Verdict: Ruling in favor of plaintiff for $5000; Case: Futrell v. Green: Even Your Auntie Thinks You Did Me Dirty; Jury: Ts Madison, Chris Spangle, Ray J, Carmen Barton; Plaintiff: Jada Futrell; Plaintiff Witness: Adrian Ballard; Defendant: Aleysha Green; Verdict: Ruling in favor of defendant for $0
35	15	"You Stole My Chanel, Go to Hell"	May 28, 2025
Episode 15 cases: Case: Helms v. Helms: Bro Crashed My Car & Stole My Insurance Check; Jury: Karlous Miller, Tamar Braxton, DeRay Davis, Carmen Barton; Plaintiff: Special Helms; Defendant: Spencer Helms; Verdict: Ruling in favor of plaintiff for $4000; Case: Brown v. Ben: Your Son Broke My TV! You Owe Me!; Jury: Ts Madison, Chris Spangle, Ray J, Carmen Barton; Plaintiff: Teria Brown; Defendant: Aja Ben; Verdict: Ruling in favor of nobody; Case: Barrett v. Golden: You Stole My Chanel? Go To Hell!; Jury: Karlous Miller, Tamar Braxton, DeRay Davis, Carmen Barton; Plaintiff: Myeshia Barrett; Defendant: Terry Golden; Verdict: Ruling in favor of defendant for $0
36	16	"My Paycheck Doesn't Check Out"	June 4, 2025
Episode 16 cases: Case: Morgan v. Bishop: My Paycheck Doesn't Check Out!; Jury: Ts Madison, Chris Spangle, Ray J, Carmen Barton; Plaintiff: Cassandra Morgan; Defendant: Corey Bishop; Verdict: Ruling in favor of plaintiff for $400; Case: Thompson v. Johnson: You Have a License to Pay For; Jury: Karlous Miller, Tamar Braxton, DeRay Davis, Carmen Barton; Plaintiff: Charles Thompson; Defendant: Naomi Johnson; Verdict: Ruling in favor of plaintiff for $600; Case: Gamby v. Bell: You Ranked My Ride; Jury: Karlous Miller, Tamar Braxton, DeRay Davis, Carmen Barton; Plaintiff: Joy Gamby; Defendant: Correy Bell; Verdict: Ruling in favor of plaintiff for $500
37	17	"You Botched My Hairdo & Stole My Boo"	June 11, 2025
Episode 17 cases: Case: Wallace v. Conklin: You Messed Up My Do and Stole My Boo; Jury: Karlous Miller, Tamar Braxton, DeRay Davis, Carmen Barton; Plaintiff: Edward Wallace; Defendant: DeMarco Conklin; Defendant Witness: Kensey Davis; Verdict: Ruling in favor of plaintiff for $342; Case: Brown v. Brown: Your Dog Bit Me, Bro!; Jury: Ts Madison, Chris Spangle, Ray J, Carmen Barton; Plaintiff: Endiyah Brown; Defendant: Ayden Brown; Defendant Witness: Rhonda Whitely; Verdict: Ruling in favor of defendant for $0; Case: Jones v. Thompson: The Wheels Ain't Turning on This Loan; Jury: Ts Madison, Chris Spangle, Ray J, Carmen Barton; Plaintiff: Destiny Jones; Defendant: Jennifer Thompson; Verdict: Ruling in favor of defendant for $766
38	18	"Rent, Romance & Regret"	June 18, 2025
Episode 18 cases: Case: Love v. Desatnik: You Live with Your Ex? Next!; Jury: Ts Madison, Chris Spangle, Ray J, Carmen Barton; Plaintiff: Clavacia Love; Defendant: Brittany Desatnik; Verdict: Ruling in favor of nobody; Case: Raxton v. Janvier: You Botched by Bets; Jury: Ts Madison, Chris Spangle, Ray J, Carmen Barton; Plaintiff: Chris Raxton; Defendant: Rubens Janvier; Verdict: Ruling in favor of nobody; Case: Boykins v. Nelson: Where's My Mother-Truckin' Money?; Jury: Karlous Miller, Tamar Braxton, DeRay Davis, Carmen Barton; Plaintiff: Majaghoni Boykins; Defendant: Lakesha Nelson; Verdict: Ruling in favor of defendant for $0
39	19	"Busted Bathroom Blowout"	June 25, 2025
Episode 19 cases: Case: Jenkins v. Clayton: This Ain't Model Behavior; Jury: Ts Madison, Chris Spangle, Ray J, Carmen Barton; Plaintiff: Archie Jenkins; Defendant: Shankedra Clayton; Verdict: Ruling in favor of plaintiff for $3000; Case: Nolan v. Nolan: Busted Bathroom Blowout!; Jury: Chris Spangle, Tamar Braxton, DeRay Davis, Carmen Barton; Plaintiff: Jackie Nolan; Defendant: Nicole Nolan; Verdict: Ruling in favor of nobody; Case: Wright v. Huey: Give the Dough Up for Your Mama Glow Up; Jury: Karlous Miller, Tamar Braxton, DeRay Davis, Carmen Barton; Plaintiff: Stewart Wright; Defendant: Lulu Huey; Verdict: Ruling in favor of plaintiff for $50
40	20	"You Owe Me for VIP"	July 2, 2025
Episode 20 cases: Case: Young v. Young: Dog Door Afternoon; Jury: Ts Madison, Chris Spangle, Ray J, Carmen Barton; Plaintiff: Keith Young; Plaintiff Witness: Keith Young Sr.; Defendant: Kevin Young; Verdict: Ruling in favor of plaintiff for $850; Case: Darden v. Frazier: You Owe Me for VIP!; Jury: Karlous Miller, Tamar Braxton, DeRay Davis, Carmen Barton; Plaintiff: Constantine Darden; Defendant: Jahad Frazier; Verdict: Ruling in favor of plaintiff for $350; Case: Allen v. Willis: Beach Better Have My Money; Jury: Ts Madison, Chris Spangle, Ray J, Carmen Barton; Plaintiff: Nicole Allen; Defendant: Carlene Willis; Verdict: Ruling in favor of plaintiff for $763

=== Season 3 (2025–26) ===
No. overall	No. in season	Title	Original release date
Part 1
41	1	"Bail, Baecation & Betrayal"	November 4, 2025
Episode 1 cases: Case: Humphrey v. Dogan: Hotel Bail-ifornia; Jury: Karlous Miller, Jasmin Brown, Safaree Samuels, Carmen Barton; Plaintiff: Joseph Humphrey; Defendant: Shaneeka Dogan; Verdict: Ruling in favor of plaintiff for $5000; Case: Angels v. Figueroa: A Twisted Situation; Jury: DeRay Davis, NeNe Leakes, Navv Greene, Carmen Barton; Plaintiff: Manny Angels; Plaintiff Witness: Natalia Testa; Defendant: Shar Figueroa; Verdict: Ruling in favor of plaintiff for $4300; Case: Lee v. Stiell: The Tooth About Tacos!; Jury: Karlous Miller, Jasmin Brown, Safaree Samuels, Carmen Barton; Plaintiff: Tommie Lee; Defendant: Jay Stiell; Verdict: Ruling in favor of nobody
42	2	"The Wig, The Whip & The Woof"	November 4, 2025
Episode 2 cases: Case: Taylor v. Guzman: BBL - Big Bold Lies!; Jury: Karlous Miller, Jasmin Brown, Safaree Samuels, Carmen Barton; Plaintiff: William Taylor; Defendant: Janesa Guzman; Verdict: Ruling in favor of defendant for $0; Case: Pierre v. Valerius: Your Dog Ruined Thanksgiving!; Jury: DeRay Davis, NeNe Leakes, Navv Greene, Carmen Barton; Plaintiff: Winnie Pierre; Defendant: Cynthia Valerius; Verdict: Ruling in favor of plaintiff for $225; Case: James v. Roberson: A Weave Gone Wrong; Jury: DeRay Davis, NeNe Leakes, Navv Greene, Carmen Barton; Plaintiff: Mehgan James; Defendant: Qualitesha Roberson; Verdict: Ruling in favor of plaintiff for $5000
43	3	"You Can't Pay Rent With A Kidney"	November 11, 2025
Episode 3 cases: Case: Coleman v. Crosskey: Floored and Ignored; Jury: Karlous Miller, NeNe Leakes, Navv Greene, Carmen Barton; Plaintiff: Tiffony Coleman; Defendant: Shawn Crosskey; Witness: Retro; Verdict: Ruling in favor of plaintiff for $2000; Case: Jackson v. Davis: Bye Freeloading Felicia; Jury: Karlous Miller, Jasmin Brown, Safaree Samuels, Carmen Barton; Plaintiff: Kimberly Jackson; Defendant: Felicia Davis; Verdict: Ruling in favor of plaintiff for $2000; Case: Boone v. Powell: Deuce's Dietary Disaster!; Jury: Karlous Miller, NeNe Leakes, Navv Greene, Carmen Barton; Plaintiff: Feniece Boone; Defendant: Shay Powell; Verdict: Ruling in favor of defendant for $435
44	4	"Garbage, Grudges, And Grown-Up Rent"	November 11, 2025
Episode 4 cases: Case: Jackson v. Shaw: Trash Talking Tenants; Jury: Karlous Miller, NeNe Leakes, Navv Greene, Carmen Barton; Plaintiff: Daphne Jackson; Defendant: Chyna Shaw; Verdict: Ruling in favor of nobody; Case: Zellers v. Norman: Birthday Blues Because of Boo; Jury: DeRay Davis, NeNe Leakes, Navv Greene, Carmen Barton; Plaintiff: Sharonda Zellers; Defendant: Kleon Norman; Verdict: Ruling in favor of plaintiff for $1200; Case: Brown v. Brown: My Rent-Gouging Mother; Jury: Karlous Miller, Jasmin Brown, Safaree Samuels, Carmen Barton; Plaintiff: Chase Brown; Defendant: Courtney Brown; Verdict: Ruling in favor of defendant for $0
45	5	"Siblings, Strip Clubs, & Stacks"	November 18, 2025
Episode 5 cases: Case: Speaks v. Smith: Booty Shake Made the Mirror Break!; Jury: DeRay Davis, NeNe Leakes, Navv Greene, Carmen Barton; Plaintiff: Cocoa Speaks; Defendant: Sarafina Smith; Verdict: Ruling in favor of plaintiff for $900; Case: Laye v. Laye: Make It Rain Payback, Brother!; Jury: Karlous Miller, Jasmin Brown, Safaree Samuels, Carmen Barton; Plaintiff: Ashley Laye; Defendant: Nikia Laye; Verdict: Ruling in favor of nobody; Case: Collins v. Jones: Gambling Away the Profits; Jury: Karlous Miller, NeNe Leakes, Navv Greene, Carmen Barton; Plaintiff: Tremaine Collins; Plaintiff Witness: Anthony Jones; Defendant: Regina Jones; Verdict: Ruling in favor of plaintiff for $3300
46	6	"Botox, Backstabs, & Busted Friendships"	November 18, 2025
Episode 6 cases: Case: McNulty v. McNulty: Mom, You Went from Vet Bills to Lip Fills!; Jury: DeRay Davis, NeNe Leakes, Karlous Miller, Carmen Barton; Plaintiff: Gwyn McNulty; Defendant: Lynn McNulty; Verdict: Ruling in favor of defendant for $0; Case: Davis v. Davis: You Quit, But Where's My Money?; Jury: Karlous Miller, Jasmin Brown, Safaree Samuels, Carmen Barton; Plaintiff: Samatha Davis; Defendant: Dinah Davis; Verdict: Ruling in favor of plaintiff for $1750; Case: Sawyer v. Ejelonu: All Jokes Aside; Jury: Karlous Miller, Jasmin Brown, Safaree Samuels, Carmen Barton; Plaintiff: Dr. Holly Sawyer; Defendant: Akudo Ejelonu; Verdict: Ruling in favor of defendant for $0
47	7	"Ditched The Bday Bash For A Smash"	November 25, 2025
Episode 7 cases: Case: Williams v. Harrison: A Ticket of Betrayal; Jury: Karlous Miller, Jasmin Brown, Safaree Samuels, Carmen Barton; Plaintiff: Tracy Williams; Plaintiff Witness: Travis Hall; Defendant: Akela Harrison; Verdict: Ruling in favor of plaintiff for $630; Case: Rich v. Browning: Don't Talk About Bruno!; Jury: DeRay Davis, NeNe Leakes, Karlous Miller, Carmen Barton; Plaintiff: Shacoria Rich; Defendant: Michael Browning; Verdict: Ruling in favor of plaintiff for $2000; Case: Stewart v. Maul: Plat to Pay; Jury: Karlous Miller, Jasmin Brown, Safaree Samuels, Carmen Barton; Plaintiff: Passsion Stewart; Defendant: Diverse Maul; Verdict: Ruling in favor of defendant for $0
48	8	"You Sold The Show & Sold Me Out"	December 2, 2025
Episode 8 cases: Case: Jackson v. Simone: You Ran a Scam at My Comedy Jam!; Jury: DeRay Davis, NeNe Leakes, Navv Greene, Carmen Barton; Plaintiff: Jammie Jackson; Defendant: Coco Simone; Verdict: Ruling in favor of plaintiff for $1750; Case: Spiller v. Obinyan: Grandma's Chevy Levy; Jury: DeRay Davis, NeNe Leakes, Karlous Miller, Carmen Barton; Plaintiff: Melanie Spiller; Defendant: Brittany Obinyan; Verdict: Ruling in favor of defendant; Case: McCray v. Ellis: Scam-uationship!; Jury: Karlous Miller, Jasmin Brown, Safaree Samuels, Carmen Barton; Plaintiff: William McCray; Defendant: Alexandria Ellis; Verdict: Ruling in favor of plaintiff for $2300
49	9	"Cousins, Clout & Crazy Glue"	December 9, 2025
Episode 9 cases: Case: Strickland v. Livingston: Lashing Out with False Allegations; Jury: DeRay Davis, NeNe Leakes, Karlous Miller, Carmen Barton; Plaintiff: Kandace Strickland; Defendant: Shynise Livingston; Verdict: Ruling in favor of defendant; Case: Higgs v. Redic: Wedding Dine and Dash; Jury: Karlous Miller, Jasmin Brown, Safaree Samuels, Carmen Barton; Plaintiff: Tawanda Higgs; Defendant: Javossiya Redic; Verdict: Ruling in favor of plaintiff for $3500; Case: Letcher v. Marvel: The Pod and the Bod; Jury: Karlous Miller, Jasmin Brown, Safaree Samuels, Carmen Barton; Plaintiff: Clarencia Letcher; Defendant: Xavier Marvel; Verdict: Ruling in favor of plaintiff for $625
50	10	"The Twin, The Ex & The Karaoke Queen"	December 16, 2025
Episode 10 cases: Case: Brewer v. Thomas: Rub and Ugh!; Jury: Karlous Miller, Jasmin Brown, Safaree Samuels, Carmen Barton; Plaintiff: Xica Brewer; Defendant: Taj Thomas; Verdict: Ruling in favor of plaintiff for $2560; Case: Simmons v. Simmons: The Ex-Husband and the Ex-Van; Jury: DeRay Davis, NeNe Leakes, Navv Greene, Carmen Barton; Plaintiff: Aleishia Simmons; Defendant: Darnell Simmons; Verdict: ~~Ruling in favor of defendant~~; Ruling in favor of plaintiff for $3500; Case: Bryant v. Bryant: She Got a Vacay, I Got the Bill; Jury: Karlous Miller, Jasmin Brown, Safaree Samuels, Carmen Barton; Plaintiff: Shyla Bryant; Plaintiff Witness: Aurora Bryant; Defendant: Shyra Bryant; Verdict: Ruling in favor of plaintiff for $1500
Part 2
51	11	"Granny's Gambling Gone Wrong"	June 30, 2026
Episode 11 cases: Case: Ross v. Price: Give Grandma Some Credit!; Jury: Karlous Miller, Jasmin Brown, Safaree Samuels, Carmen Barton; Plaintiff: Cynthia Ross; Defendant: Ethel Price; Verdict: Ruling in favor of defendant for $1900; Case: Hudson-O'Connor v. Hall: Yellow Dress, Red Flags; Jury: Karlous Miller, NeNe Leakes, Navv Greene, Carmen Barton; Plaintiff: Chanel Hudson-O'Connor; Defendant: Shuntel Hall; Verdict: Ruling in favor of plaintiff for $5000; Case: Gage v. Davis: Lights, Camera, Lawsuit!; Jury: Karlous Miller, Jasmin Brown, Safaree Samuels, Carmen Barton; Plaintiff: Jalen Gage; Defendant: Kamilla Davis; Polygraph Expert: Zoey Selman; Verdict: Ruling in favor of plaintiff for $3700
52	12	"Broke, Blocked & Busted"	July 7, 2026
Episode 12 cases: Case: Drayton v. Baggs: Towed and Owed; Jury: Karlous Miller, Jasmin Brown, Safaree Samuels, Carmen Barton; Plaintiff: Alisha Drayton; Defendant: Brianna Baggs; Verdict: Ruling in favor of nobody; Case: Dawkins v. Dawkins: Chef Boy R Don't; Jury: Karlous Miller, Jasmin Brown, Safaree Samuels, Carmen Barton; Plaintiff: Kahlilah Dawkins; Defendant: Rashad Dawkins; Verdict: Ruling in favor of defendant; Case: Fuller v. Wellons: You've Been Disconnected; Jury: DeRay Davis, NeNe Leakes, Karlous Miller, Carmen Barton; Plaintiff: Jamika Fuller; Defendant: Dontavious Wellons; Verdict: Ruling in favor of plaintiff for $500
53	13	"Baby Beef, Blown Bucks & Backyard Booty Mayhem"	July 14, 2026
Episode 13 cases: Case: Springs v. Springs: The Eyes Are Full of Lies; Jury: DeRay Davis, NeNe Leakes, Navv Greene, Carmen Barton; Plaintiff: Daphnique Springs; Defendant: Daphne Springs; Verdict: Ruling in favor of plaintiff for $5000; Case: Mason v. King: Bougie Baby Shower; Jury: DeRay Davis, NeNe Leakes, Navv Greene, Carmen Barton; Plaintiff: Tia Mason; Defendant: Latrese King; Verdict: Ruling in favor of defendant; Case: Pratt v. Ihim: Swinging for the Fences; Jury: Karlous Miller, Jasmin Brown, Safaree Samuels, Carmen Barton; Plaintiff: Capodei Pratt; Defendant: Jordan Ihim; Verdict: Ruling in favor of plaintiff for $4089
54	14	"Gimme My Cash For Granny"	July 21, 2026
Episode 14 cases: Case: Dennis v. Lewis: If I Can't Sue Your Kids, I'm Suing You!; Jury: DeRay Davis, NeNe Leakes, Karlous Miller, Carmen Barton; Plaintiff: Miranda Dennis; Defendant: Akivia Lewis; Verdict: Ruling in favor of defendant; Case: Chatman v. Liggins: No Corny Business; Jury: Karlous Miller, Jasmin Brown, Safaree Samuels, Carmen Barton; Plaintiff: Latryce Chatman; Defendant: Constance Liggins; Verdict: Ruling in favor of plaintiff for $5000; Case: Petway v. Hampton: Caregiver? Or Jewel of Denial?; Jury: Karlous Miller, Jasmin Brown, Safaree Samuels, Carmen Barton; Plaintiff: Jewel Petway; Defendant: Andre Hampton; Verdict: Ruling in favor of plaintiff for $1500
55	15	"Livestock On The Loose"	July 28, 2026
Episode 15 cases: Case: Adams v. Weams: All Aboard the Family Feud!; Jury: Karlous Miller, Jasmin Brown, Safaree Samuels, Carmen Barton; Plaintiff: Latrice Adams; Defendant: Jaysun Weams; Verdict: Ruling in favor of defendant; Case: White v. Symone: Schooling My Teacher!; Jury: DeRay Davis, NeNe Leakes, Navv Greene, Carmen Barton; Plaintiff: Delexia White; Defendant: Taylor Symone; Defendant Witness: Nikal Morgan; Verdict: Ruling in favor of plaintiff for $1800; Case: Antonov v. Lazzara: Farm-A-Geddon; Jury: Karlous Miller, Jasmin Brown, Safaree Samuels, Carmen Barton; Plaintiff: Eugene Antonov; Defendant: Audrey Lazzara; Verdict: Ruling in favor of plaintiff for $1973.74
56	16	"Fleas, Fees & Family Feuds"	August 4, 2026
Episode 16 cases: Case: Shabazz v. Black: Child Care for Cars; Jury: Karlous Miller, Jasmin Brown, Safaree Samuels, Carmen Barton; Plaintiff: Jamilla Shabazz; Defendant: Joshua Black; Verdict: Ruling in favor of nobody; Case: Delaney v. Biggs: She Trimmed Waistlines - And Profits!; Jury: Karlous Miller, Jasmin Brown, Safaree Samuels, Carmen Barton; Plaintiff: Tephanie Delaney; Defendant: Regina Biggs; Verdict: Ruling in favor of plaintiff for $4000; Case: Ware v. Cannon: Airbnb or Airb-'N Free?; Jury: DeRay Davis, NeNe Leakes, Navv Greene, Carmen Barton; Plaintiff: Dre Ware; Defendant: Mario Cannon; Verdict: Ruling in favor of plaintiff for $4000
57	17	"Wrecked Rides, Ransacked Houses & One Haircut From Hell"	August 11, 2026
Episode 17 cases: Case: Allen v. Rosado: Crash Course in Friendship; Jury: DeRay Davis, NeNe Leakes, Navv Greene, Carmen Barton; Plaintiff: Nyesha Allen; Defendant: Lucy Rosado; Verdict: Ruling in favor of nobody; Case: Jordan v. Jetter: House Party Horror Story; Jury: Karlous Miller, Jasmin Brown, Safaree Samuels, Carmen Barton; Plaintiff: Jordan Jordan; Defendant: Keyon Jetter; Verdict: Ruling in favor of plaintiff for $3250; Case: Stevens v. Shirley: Ride or Dye; Jury: Karlous Miller, Jasmin Brown, Safaree Samuels, Carmen Barton; Plaintiff: Alicia Stevens; Defendant: Britney Shirley; Verdict: Ruling in favor of plaintiff for $750
58	18	"Clout, Power, And Orange Chicken Hour"	August 18, 2026
Episode 18 cases: Case: McKnight-Coard v. Tyler: Family, Followers, & Fraud; Jury: Karlous Miller, Jasmin Brown, Safaree Samuels, Carmen Barton; Plaintiff: Artina McKnight-Coard; Defendant: Jeremiah Tyler; Verdict: Ruling in favor of defendant; Case: Jackson v. Purcell: Freeloading Friend with Benefits; Jury: DeRay Davis, NeNe Leakes, Navv Greene, Carmen Barton; Plaintiff: Jordan Jackson; Defendant: Schelle Purcell; Verdict: Ruling in favor of plaintiff for $1800; Case: Alvarado v. Merrifield: Fowl Play - A Recipe for Disaster!; Jury: Karlous Miller, Jasmin Brown, Safaree Samuels, Carmen Barton; Plaintiff: Joel Alvarado; Defendant: Renee Merrifield; Verdict: Ruling in favor of nobody
59	19	"Cash, Cars, & Courtroom Chaos"	August 25, 2026
Episode 19 cases: Case: McClendon v. Goodman: Sick Days for Sexy Mishaps; Jury: Karlous Miller, Jasmin Brown, Safaree Samuels, Carmen Barton; Plaintiff: Rai-Keishia McClendon; Defendant: Michael Goodman; Verdict: Ruling in favor of plaintiff for $1350.03; Case: McCullen v. Coleman: One Cupcake Too Many!; Jury: Karlous Miller, Jasmin Brown, Safaree Samuels, Carmen Barton; Plaintiff: Ericka McCullen; Defendant: Patrick "Jack Life" Coleman; Verdict: Ruling in favor of defendant; Case: Tucker v. Tucker: Cash for Cars, or Kicks?; Jury: DeRay Davis, NeNe Leakes, Navv Greene, Carmen Barton; Plaintiff: Santina Tucker; Defendant: Justin Tucker; Verdict: Ruling in favor of plaintiff for $3000
60	20	"The Tooth, The Ferret, The Printing Press"	September 1, 2026
Episode 20 cases: Case: Brioux v. Harrison: Pet Ferret Causing Havoc; Jury: Karlous Miller, Jasmin Brown, Safaree Samuels, Carmen Barton; Plaintiff: Shawna Brioux; Defendant: Miranda Harrison; Verdict: Ruling in favor of plaintiff for $500; Case: Williams v. Ware: Tooth and Consequences; Jury: DeRay Davis, NeNe Leakes, Navv Greene, Carmen Barton; Plaintiff: Wilhelmenia Williams; Defendant: Camille Ware; Verdict: Ruling in favor of plaintiff for $3417; Case: Houseworth v. Carr: You Betrayed Me at Every Stitch; Jury: Karlous Miller, Jasmin Brown, Safaree Samuels, Carmen Barton; Plaintiff: Preston Houseworth; Defendant: Dashawn Carr; Verdict: Ruling in favor of defendant
