= Black Reel Award for Outstanding Lead Performance, Comedy Series =

Television award for lead comedy actor at the Black Reel Awards

- The 2025 recipient: Quinta Brunson
- Awarded for: Outstanding Performance
- Country: United States
- Presented by: Black Reel Awards (BRAs)
- First award: 2023
- Most recent winner: Quinta Brunson; Abbott Elementary
- Website: blackreelawards.com

This article lists the winners and nominees for the Black Reel Award for Outstanding Lead Performance in a Comedy Series. The award recognizes an actor or actress who delivers an outstanding performance in a leading role of a comedy television series within the given eligible period.

The award was first presented at the 23rd Annual Black Reel Awards as a result of a merger between the Outstanding Actor and Outstanding Actress awards into a single gender-neutral award, with a total of ten nominees being selected. Quinta Brunson is the inaugural winner for her performance in the second season of Abbott Elementary, for which she also won a Primetime Emmy Award.

== Winners and nominees ==
=== 2020s ===
| Year | Actor | Role(s) | Series |
|---|---|---|---|
2023
| 2023 | Quinta Brunson | Janine Teagues | Abbott Elementary |
| 2023 | Tichina Arnold | Tina Butler | The Neighborhood |
| 2023 | Cedric the Entertainer | Calvin Butler | The Neighborhood |
| 2023 | Donald Glover | Earnest "Earn" Marks | Atlanta |
| 2023 | Meagan Good | Camille Parks | Harlem |
| 2023 | Jasmine Cephas Jones | Ashley Rose | Blindspotting |
| 2023 | Delroy Lindo | Edwin Alexander | Unprisoned |
| 2023 | Ms. Pat | Patricia "Pat" Ford Carson | The Ms. Pat Show |
| 2023 | Robin Thede | Various characters | A Black Lady Sketch Show |
| 2023 | Kerry Washington | Paige Alexander | Unprisoned |
2024
| 2024 | Ayo Edebiri | Sydney Adamu | The Bear |
| 2024 | Quinta Brunson | Janine Teagues | Abbott Elementary |
| 2024 | Michelle Buteau | Mavis Beaumont | Survival of the Thickest |
| 2024 | Renée Elise Goldsberry | Wickie | Girls5eva |
| 2024 | Jharrel Jerome | Cootie | I'm a Virgo |
| 2024 | Diarra Kilpatrick | Diarra Brickland | Diarra from Detroit |
| 2024 | Anthony Mackie | John Doe | Twisted Metal |
| 2024 | Ms. Pat | Patricia "Pat" Ford Carson | The Ms. Pat Show |
| 2024 | Maya Rudolph | Molly Wells | Loot |
| 2024 | Jaz Sinclair | Marie Moreau | Gen V |
2025
| 2025 | Quinta Brunson | Janine Teagues | Abbott Elementary |
| 2025 | Uzo Aduba | Cordelia Cupp | The Residence |
| 2025 | Michelle Buteau | Mavis Beaumont | Survival of the Thickest |
| 2025 | Ayo Edebiri | Sydney Adamu | The Bear |
| 2025 | Meagan Good | Camille Parks | Harlem |
| 2025 | Delroy Lindo | Edwin Alexander | UnPrisoned |
| 2025 | Simone Missick | Astoria Chambers | Government Cheese |
| 2025 | David Oyelowo | Hampton Chambers | Government Cheese |
| 2025 | Natasha Rothwell | Melissa | How to Die Alone |
| 2025 | Kerry Washington | Paige Alexander | UnPrisoned |

== Multiple nominations and wins ==
=== Multiple wins ===
2 wins

- Quinta Brunson

=== Multiple nominations ===
3 nominations

- Quinta Brunson

2 nominations

- Ayo Edebiri
- Michelle Buteau
- Meagan Good
- Delroy Lindo
- Ms. Pat
- Kerry Washington

== Age superlatives ==
| Record | Actor | Series | Age (in years) |
|---|---|---|---|
| Oldest winner | Quinta Brunson | Abbott Elementary | 35 |
| Oldest nominee | Delroy Lindo | Unprisoned | 72 |
| Youngest winner | Ayo Edebiri | The Bear | 28 |
| Youngest nominee | Jharrel Jerome | I'm a Virgo | 26 |
