= The Ms. Pat Show =

American television series

- Genre: Sitcom
- Created by: Jordan E. Cooper; Patricia "Ms. Pat" Williams
- Based on: Rabbit: The Autobiography of Ms. Pat by Patricia Williams
- Starring: Ms. Pat; J. Bernard Calloway; Tami Roman; Vince Swann; Briyana Guadalupe; Theodore John Barnes
- Country of origin: United States
- Original language: English
- No. of seasons: 5
- No. of episodes: 46

Production
- Producers: Jordan E. Cooper; Patricia Williams; Lee Daniels; Brian Grazer; Deborah Evans; Jon Radler; Mary Lou Belli
- Production locations: Atlanta, Georgia, U.S.
- Production companies: Imagine Television; Lee Daniels Entertainment; DAE Light Media; BET Original Productions

Original release
- Network: BET+
- Release: August 12, 2021 – February 11, 2026
- Network: Paramount+

The Ms. Pat Show is an American television sitcom created by Jordan E. Cooper and Patricia "Ms. Pat" Williams that premiered on the streaming service BET+ on August 12, 2021. The show is based on the comedy and life story of comedian Ms. Pat as a convicted felon from the streets of Atlanta turned reluctant suburban mother.

The series has received nominations for 4 Primetime Emmy Awards for Outstanding Directing for a Comedy Series.

== Premise ==
Set in Plainfield, Indiana, the series follows Ms. Pat's fictional family, the Carsons: Pat (Ms. Pat); her husband Terry (J. Bernard Calloway); her sister Denise (Tami Roman); and Pat's children Ashley (Brittany Inge); Brandon (Vince Swann); Janelle (Briyana Guadalupe); and Junebug (Theodore John Barnes).

Pat sometimes struggles to adjust with the changing times and ways of her conservative Indiana town after moving there from her Atlanta, Georgia, hometown. Although blunt and sometimes hardheaded, Pat loves her family and her open-mindedness helps her succeed as a Black woman in a suburban white neighborhood.

== Cast ==
=== Main ===
- Ms. Pat as Patricia "Pat" Ford Carson, the matriarch of the Carson household. She, like Ms. Pat in real life, grew up in rough conditions in Atlanta, had two children when she was a teenager, and moved to Plainfield with her husband with whom she has two more children. While her older kids' father abused her and provided her with little to no support, her husband Terry loves her and acts as the loving partner she never had with her older kids' father. Patricia has four children: Ashley and Brandon, from her first relationship with Lloyd; and Janelle and Junebug, from her marriage to Terry.
- J. Bernard Calloway as Terry Carson, Patricia's well-meaning husband. He is based on Ms. Pat's husband, Garrett. Though his wife grew up with a lack of a strong support system, he provides her with the real love and stability that she never had during her turbulent childhood.
- Tami Roman as Denise Ford, Patricia's free-loading sister who lives with the family. Often a source of comedic tension between Ms. Pat and Terry, she struggles to keep a job.
- Vince Swann as Brandon James, Patricia's sweet, but dimwitted son from a previous relationship with Patricia's ex-boyfriend from Atlanta. He is based on Ms. Pat's son, Nikia.
- Briyana Guadalupe as Janelle Carson, Terry and Patricia's sour and intellectual daughter who is almost 17 years old. She is based on Ms. Pat's daughter, Garrianna.
- Theodore John Barnes as Junebug Carson, Terry and Patricia's cheerful youngest child, who is 14 years old and obsessed with social media. He is based on Ms. Pat's son Garrett "Junebug," Jr.

=== Recurring ===
- Brittany Inge as Ashley James, Patricia's eldest child from her previous relationship as a teenager who is a therapist. She and her mother have a rocky relationship toward the beginning of the show due to their disagreement over Ashley being a lesbian, but Pat grows to accept her identity.
- Reagan Pasternak as Elizabeth Patterson, the PTO chair and best friend to Pat and Denise. Well-to-do with a past of her own, she is also Ryan’s mom. Elizabeth is initially portrayed as the straight-laced opposite of her new neighbor Pat, but she soon becomes Pat and Denise's closest friend in the neighborhood and enthusiastically helps them in a few schemes.
- Robert Curtis Brown as Principal Horner, the principal at Ridgewood High School. He becomes at odds with Pat and Janelle when he makes racist assumptions during a meeting with them. Denise recognizes him at a PTO meeting from when he offered her a threesome on Christian Mingle.
- Lindsey Pearlman as Martha, Principal Horner's assistant at Ridgewood High School. She struggles to adapt to black culture and mistakes Janelle's name as "Janeesha" and "Janiqua." At a PTO meeting, fellow participant Elizabeth reveals that Martha has a criminal record. Martha was one of actress Lindsey Pearlman's last roles before her death in 2022.
- Gavin Bedell as Ryan Patterson, one of Junebug's friends. He is the son of the PTO chair and first appears on the scene when enlisted to help Junebug with one of Ms. Pat's schemes.
- Nicholas Ryan Hernandez as Sergio, another of Junebug's friends. He learns a very important lesson about using the n-word.
- Josh Dunn as Jesse, Janelle's non-binary friend from the debate team who butts heads with their religious and unaccepting mother, Jackie.
- Jonathan Horne as Lee Grazer, Janelle's debate teacher. Denise and Lee develop an unexpected mutual attraction for each other after Denise’s frustrations attempting to use dating apps.
- Shawn Harrison as William K., manager of the comedy club where Pat performs. At first, he tries to stop Pat from performing because he doesn't like her rough style of humor. After seeing how much the crowd loves her act, William K has a change of heart and decides to make her the club's headliner.
- Tommy Davidson as Marcus, Pat and Denise's cousin. He shows up to help the family go through their problems and is known to come whenever the wind blows. He often says "Look what the wind blew the fuck in" when he enters.
- Miya Golden as Tanika, Ashley's girlfriend, a chef who shares an apartment with Ashley in Chicago who turned out to be cheating on her. The two revealed to have broken up in the season two finale, when Ashley shows up at Pat's door.
- Ebony Marshall-Oliver as Mildred Ford, Pat and Denise's mother. After Mildred's death in the first episode of season two, Pat reflects on the toxic relationship that she had with her mother. Pat imagines at Mildred's funeral that she has a spirited discussion with her when Mildred pops out of her coffin. Pat later flashes back to a traumatic incident when her mother verbally abused her for having "nappy" hair, unlike Denise. Mildred returns in season four as a ghost to haunt Pat and Denise, and jeopardizes Pat's relationship with her daughter Janelle.
- Richard Lawson as Major Carson, Terry's presumed father. He and Terry struggle to fix their relationship because of Major's history of cheating on Terry's mother. In season two, he reveals that he's not his biological father.
- Janet Hubert as Jewell Carson, Terry's mother who looks down on Pat for her past as a drug dealer
- Inayah as Trina, the daughter of Pat's cousin, Tanya

=== Guest ===
- Ts Madison as Shirley (season 1)
- Don Curry as Tony Free (season 3)
- Syleena Johnson as Naomi (season 3)
- Jaleel White as Max Jefferson (season 3)
- Lisa Vidal as Michelle (season 3)
- Essence Atkins as Charnelle (season 3)
- Marla Gibbs as Miss Pearl (season 3)
- Debra Wilson as Veronica (season 4)
- Flex Alexander as Pastor Jenkins (season 4)
- Golden Brooks as Tanya (season 4)
- Kellie Williams as Lisa (season 4)
- Raven-Symoné as Lady Tyra (season 5)
- Tisha Campbell as Detective Sheila Jackson (season 5)
- Tristan Wilds as Professor Christian DeWalt (season 5)
- Keith Robinson as James Freeman (season 5)
- Sandra Caldwell as Yolanda (season 5)
- Loretta Devine as Carol (season 5)
- SWV as themselves (season 5)

== Episodes ==
Season	Episodes	Originally released	
Season	Episodes	First released	Last released
1	10	August 12, 2021	
2	10	August 11, 2022	
3	10	February 23, 2023	November 23, 2023
4	8	May 23, 2024	
5	8	January 7, 2026	February 11, 2026

=== Season 1 (2021) ===
No. overall	No. in season	Title	Directed by	Written by	Original release date
1	1	"Duck"	Debbie Allen	Teleplay by : Jordan E. Cooper; Story by : Jordan E. Cooper & Patricia "Ms. Pat" Williams	August 12, 2021
Pat and Terry move from Atlanta to Indiana after the factory Terry works in shuts down. Pat worries about her children after a school shooting occurs, Junebug posts a Snapchat that concerns Pat and Terry, Denise tries to find a job, Brandon spends too much time gaming and is not worried about a job, and Janelle gets into a fight, which lands her in hot water.
2	2	"Slangin' Coupons"	Robbie Countryman	Randi Barnes	August 12, 2021
Janelle gets an unexpected opportunity after taking a principled stance against her teacher, and Pat and Denise hustle to win a coupon book fundraiser for the school PTO.
3	3	"Surprise!"	Mary Lou Belli	Jordan E. Cooper	August 12, 2021
When Pat's daughter Ashley comes over for her birthday, she comes out as lesbian, and she and Pat have a dispute, which causes Pat to leave. Pat does her stand-up routine, and Ashley shows up and Pat tries to apologize to her, but it sparks yet another fight.
4	4	"Sticks and Stones"	Mary Lou Belli	Garrianna P. Lee & Tom Simmons	August 12, 2021
5	5	"Baby Daddy Groundhog Day"	Mary Lou Belli	Anthony C. Hill	August 12, 2021
6	6	"Bitch... I'm Funny"	Mary Lou Belli	Desia Gore	August 12, 2021
Guest star: Shawn Harrison as William K.
7	7	"Lights Out"	Leonard R. Garner Jr.	Loy A. Webb	August 12, 2021
8	8	"Brotha Poppins"	Leonard R. Garner Jr.	Vincent B. Bryant Jr.	August 12, 2021
9	9	"Girls Night Out"	Kim Fields	Patricia "Ms. Pat" Williams & Jordan E. Cooper	August 12, 2021
10	10	"Don't Eat That Shit"	Kim Fields	Farhan Arshad	August 12, 2021
When Janelle eats a brownie and gets high, Pat and Denise have a fallout, which ends with Pat putting Denise out on the street.

=== Season 2 (2022) ===
No. overall	No. in season	Title	Directed by	Written by	Original release date
11	1	"Ding-Dong, The Bitch is Dead"	Tasha Smith	Jordan E. Cooper & Patricia "Ms. Pat" Williams	August 11, 2022
After several months, Pat and Denise still have not resolved their fight over the pot brownie. Meanwhile, the family gets a call that Pat and Denise's mother, Mildred, has died, leading the Carsons to travel to Atlanta for the funeral.
12	2	"Judge Miss Sophia"	Mary Lou Belli	Brian Rubenstein	August 11, 2022
Denise, still upset at Pat for kicking her out of the house, tries to sue her for damages on a courtroom show run by a drag queen.
13	3	"Don't Touch My Hair"	Mary Lou Belli	Desia Gore	August 11, 2022
Terry makes an insensitive remark about Pat's hair, bringing up painful memories from her childhood about her mother's abuse. Denise's latest entrepreneurial venture making hair care products goes awry when she tests the substance on Janelle live on social media.
14	4	"Gots To Be More Careful"	Mary Lou Belli	Larry Powell & Stevie Walker-Webb	August 11, 2022
When Terry is suspected of burglarizing several houses in the neighborhood, Pat, Denise, and Elizabeth hatch an absurd scheme to prove that the neighborhood watch committee has their eyes set on the wrong person.
15	5	"Parents Just Don't Understand"	Debbie Allen	Antonia March & Jacqueline McKinley	August 11, 2022
Terry's parents, Major and Jewell, come to visit the Carsons. Jewell disapproves of Pat's profession, so Pat and Denise bring Jewell to one of Pat's standup shows to change her mind. Terry is angry that his father has continued to cheat on his mother, so Terry and Major try to work out their father-son relationship with the help of Terry's therapist, Cheryl. Major reveals that Terry is the product of Jewell's affair with another man, tarnishing Terry's trust in his mother.
16	6	"Rent-A-N!gg@"	Henry Chan	Vincent B. Bryant Jr.	August 11, 2022
Since Janelle doesn't have a date for the prom, Pat sets up a dating app profile for her and finds her a comparatively intellectual date named Trey'Quan. Meanwhile, Junebug's high school is overjoyed to have a black player on their basketball team... until they find out he plays terribly.
17	7	"Trigger Warning"	Henry Chan	Teleplay by : Brian Rubenstein & Patrick Walsh; Story by : Jordan E. Cooper	August 11, 2022
The family becomes alarmed when Pat tries to make a comedic bit out of Mr. John, the man who sexually abused her and Denise as children. Janelle and Junebug find a mystery thong in the laundry and become convinced that Terry has a mistress. Denise's past trauma with Mr. John leads her to a breaking point in her relationship with Lee, and then to a strip club where Brandon happens to be one of the dancers. Guest Star: Shawn Harrison as William K.
18	8	"The Roommate"	Mary Lou Belli	Garrianna P. Lee	August 11, 2022
While in Chicago for her biggest comedy gig yet, Pat stays with Ashley and her girlfriend, Tanika. Just as she is getting adjusted to the idea of her daughter living with another woman, Pat discovers that Tanika has been cheating on Ashley, causing a huge fight that sends Pat and Tanika to jail. Back in Indiana, Terry keeps a watchful eye on Denise and her drinking habits at home and on a hunting trip.
19	9	"Teach Me"	Mary Lou Belli	Gary Anderson	August 11, 2022
Pat and Terry check out a "rage kintsugi" class that Denise is taking as a fun way to treat her mental health. Janelle and Brandon have opposing reactions when they find out that 15-year-old Junebug is seeing a 29-year-old woman who works at the mall.
20	10	"Stormy Weather"	Mary Lou Belli	Teleplay by : Jordan E. Cooper & Brian Rubenstein & Patrick Walsh; Story by : Jordan E. Cooper	August 11, 2022
A casual trip to the doctor's office leads to Pat finding out that she is pregnant. Ashley comes home after breaking up with Tanika and finds out that someone in the house is pregnant after answering a call from an abortion clinic. She and her siblings think that Denise is the pregnant one, so Denise covers for Pat until everyone eventually finds out the truth. When Terry hears the news, he is thrilled until Pat reveals that she wants to have an abortion. After she gets the abortion, the couple has a dramatic fight.

=== Season 3 (2023) ===
No. overall	No. in season	Title	Directed by	Written by	Original release date
21	1	"Guess Who's Coming To Dinner"	Jordan E. Cooper	Brian Rubenstein	February 23, 2023
Three days after her abortion revelation, tension has strengthened between Pat and Terry, but both are forced to put their separation aside as Janelle's college rep comes over for dinner, but their reunion quickly backfires.
22	2	"Pat On Tour"	Mary Lou Belli	Patrick Walsh	February 23, 2023
23	3	"Down With The King"	Mary Lou Belli	Loy A. Webb	February 23, 2023
24	4	"Ain't No Party..."	Mary Lou Belli	Devon Shepard	February 23, 2023
25	5	"Da Baddest Trip"	Jordan E. Cooper & Kelly Park	Larry Powell	February 23, 2023
26	6	"Nudes & Dudes"	Mary Lou Belli	Vincent B. Bryant Jr.	February 23, 2023
27	7	"Body Aches and Booty Shakes"	Mary Lou Belli	Garrianna P. Lee	February 23, 2023
Brandon lands a job as a teacher, but his past soon comes back to haunt him when a former customer of his shows up. Meanwhile, Terry meets a colleague, Michelle, who saves meals for him, and Pat seems cool with it. When Michelle invites him to happy hour, he tries to get Pat to come with him, but she has a show, so she allows Terry to go by himself. At happy hour, only Michelle is there, and she gives him a shirt signed by NBA star Dominique Wilkins, which he turns down. Michelle tries to get Terry to stay, but Terry hurts his ankle, which he lies to Pat, saying that he slipped on some oil at his job. When Terry goes to sleep, Pat sees texts from Michelle, who keeps calling him and texting him.
28	8	"Twenty Seven Side Pieces"	Kelly Park	Patricia "Ms. Pat" Williams & Tom Simmons	February 23, 2023
Pat is recording a podcast, but Terry's needs get in the way of her recording. Denise gets a job at a hair salon, whose workers trash about her behind her back, and she calls Pat to go undercover, which confirms Denise's suspicions, and Pat allows Denise to open up a business in her home. Meanwhile, Michelle comes to the house, and takes care of Terry, and assumes that Pat left him alone. However, when Pat comes home, she catches Terry and Michelle together, and forces Terry to sleep on the couch.
29	9	"Pills & Chills"	Jordan E. Cooper	Allison Bosma & Jon DeWalt	February 23, 2023
30	10	"Father Christmas"	Debbie Allen	Patrick Walsh	November 23, 2023

=== Season 4 (2024) ===
No. overall	No. in season	Title	Directed by	Written by	Original release date
31	1	"I’m the Pappy"	Mary Lou Belli	Patrick Walsh	May 23, 2024
After things seem to finally settle down in the Carson family home, Junebug's pregnant girlfriend Allison comes to the house needing a place to stay and Junebug tries to protest on her behalf, but she is still forced to leave but it turns out they are snowed in, and things take a turn for the worse when her waters break.
32	2	"The Book of Denise"	Jordan E. Cooper	Loy A. Webb	May 23, 2024
Both Denise and Junebug are pursuing different but similar misguided romantic endeavors when Denise becomes smitten with a pastor, and Junebug starts to question Allison's loyalty.
33	3	"Boo, Bitch!"	Mary Lou Belli	Desia Gore	May 23, 2024
Denise has a new client named Veronica who is a psychic and starts to freak her and Pat out. Soon, weird things start to happen to Pat and Denise who believe something is haunting them and it turns out to be their mother, Mildred.
34	4	"The Guilt Trip"	Mary Lou Belli	Garrianna P. Lee & Safiya Azaunce	May 23, 2024
The family prepares to leave on a road trip to Atlanta where Pat has a sold-out comedy show. They soon get derailed on the way by a flat tire where they are forced to stay in a reparations resort.
35	5	"Pick Up Your Feelings"	Sheldon Epps	Larry Powell	May 23, 2024
The Carsons finally arrive in Atlanta, where Pat and Denise are reunited with their cousin Tanya who just got out of jail and old tensions between her and Pat are brought up. Trina takes the rest of the family to her new restaurant where she works at where Brandon and Ashley are in for a not-so-great surprise.
36	6	"Blast From the Past"	Raven-Symoné	Allison Bosma & Jon DeWalt	May 23, 2024
Elizabeth is pestering Pat and Denise to go with her to see an author at his book signing and when they go Pat discovers the author is Denise's ex-boyfriend. Terry forces Janelle and Junebug to get a job and they both apply at a cupcake shop but start to notice something suspicious going on with the owner.
37	7	"A Hard Day’s Work"	Mary Lou Belli	Vincent B. Bryant, Jr.	May 23, 2024
When a director checks out Pat's show, he wants her to audition for a part in his new movie and with help from Denise and Junebug, she lands the part, but it may not be all what it seems to be. Terry's parents unexpectedly show up for Janelle's upcoming graduation, and he is forced to finally address the tension between him and his mom.
38	8	"The Graduation Party"	Mary Lou Belli	Karynrose Bruyning & Avon Haughton	May 23, 2024
It's Janelle's graduation day and Brandon accidentally lets it slip that she didn't get into Howard. She decides not to go to her graduation at all thinking she let everyone down. In retaliation, Janelle reveals Brandon's plans of traveling to Atlanta to give Lloyd a kidney. Lloyd's sudden death sparks a huge fight between Brandon and Ashley, leading them both to storm out of the Carson house.

=== Season 5 (2026) ===
No. overall	No. in season	Title	Directed by	Written by	Original release date
39	1	"Killin' and Dyin'"	Mary Lou Belli	Patrick Walsh	January 7, 2026
Tension remains high between Brandon and Ashley. Overwhelmed by work and her kids' squabbling, Pat lands in the hospital and is ordered to rest, but she's determined to make it to a show to impress a big comedian. Guest Star: Raven-Symoné as Lady Tara
40	2	"Wild Goose Chase"	Raven-Symoné	Allison Bosma & Jon DeWalt	January 7, 2026
During a family yard sale, Ashley misplaces Lloyd's ashes and his final letter, and Pat and Terry barter with a young girl to recover a very personal VHS tape.
41	3	"License and Registration?"	Raven-Symoné	Desia Gore	January 7, 2026
Janelle stresses over Pat messing up her college registration and Terry being an overprotective dad, but it's Junebug who will need protection after he drunkenly crashes Pat's car.
42	4	"Give It Arrest"	Mary Lou Belli	LarryJean Powell & Safiya Azaunce	January 14, 2026
Pat lands in the hospital again when she continues to neglect her self-care, and if she won't listen to her family, then maybe she'll listen to a good scolding from Rabbit.
43	5	"Chili, Chili, Bang, Bang"	Jordan E. Cooper	Avon Haughton & Terrance Daye	January 21, 2026
Dark secrets are revealed when Terry's old Army buddy (Keith Robinson) visits and asks for a troubling favor, and Janelle gets a little too close to her professor (Tristan Wilds).
44	6	"Hell to the Chief"	Sheldon Epps	Garrianna P. Lee & Karynrose Bruyning	January 28, 2026
Terry shocks the family when he reveals that the Carsons will host the U.S. President for dinner, and Brandon comes home with a student who needs to be hidden from ICE.
45	7	"Nobody's Star"	Mary Lou Belli	Vincent B. Bryant, Jr. & Patricia “Ms. Pat” Williams-Lee	February 4, 2026
Pat battles insecurity, Denise scrambles to hide her secret plus-one at Pat's big movie premiere, Janelle needs advice from Junebug, and Terry seeks answers from his long-lost aunt.
46	8	"A Family Thing"	Jordan E. Cooper	Jordan E. Cooper & Patrick Walsh	February 11, 2026
Denise gets carried away when Kareem plans a special date night, Janelle shares big news with Junebug, and Terry's aunt shocks everyone with the truth about his father. Denise assumes Kareem is going to propose to her when he organises a special date, but due to the stress of actually settling down, storms off. She later apologises, he reveals he was indeed going to propose, and they get engaged. Janelle continues to come back home, and she reveals to Junebug that she lost her virginity to her professor, and she is deciding to drop out of Hansberry. Yolanda reveals she is Terry's father.

== Production ==
On September 2, 2021, BET+ renewed the series for a second season which premiered on August 11, 2022. On July 6, 2022, BET+ renewed the series for a third season, which premiered on February 23, 2023. On May 30, 2023, BET+ renewed the series for a fourth season, which premiered on May 23, 2024. On October 31, 2024, BET+ renewed the series for a fifth season, which premiered on January 7, 2026. On March 26, 2026, the series was renewed for a sixth season, which will move to Paramount+ after the shutdown of BET+.

== Accolades ==
Award	Year	Category	Nominee	Result	Ref.
Black Reel Awards for Television	2023	Outstanding Lead Performance in a Comedy Series	Patricia "Ms. Pat" Williams	Nominated	
Black Reel Awards for Television	2024	Outstanding Comedy Series	Jordan E. Cooper	Nominated	
Black Reel Awards for Television	2024	Outstanding Lead Performance in a Comedy Series	Patricia "Ms. Pat" Williams	Nominated	
Black Reel Awards for Television	2024	Outstanding Supporting Performance in a Comedy Series	Tami Roman	Nominated	
Black Reel Awards for Television	2024	Outstanding Supporting Performance in a Comedy Series	Vince Swann	Nominated	
Black Reel Awards for Television	2024	Outstanding Guest Performance in a Comedy Series	Jordan E. Cooper	Nominated	
Primetime Emmy Awards	2022	Outstanding Directing for a Comedy Series	Mary Lou Belli (for "Baby Daddy Groundhog Day")	Nominated	
Primetime Emmy Awards	2023	Outstanding Directing for a Comedy Series	Mary Lou Belli (for "Don't Touch My Hair")	Nominated	
Primetime Emmy Awards	2024	Outstanding Directing for a Comedy Series	Mary Lou Belli (for "I'm the Pappy")	Nominated	
Primetime Emmy Awards	2026	Outstanding Directing for a Comedy Series	Mary Lou Belli (for "Give It Arrest")	Nominated	
