= J. Bernard Calloway =

American actor (born 1974)

- Born: Bernard Jeffrey Calloway; December 2, 1974 (age 50); Fort Lauderdale, Florida, U.S.
- Occupation: Actor
- Years active: 2003–present

J. Bernard Calloway (born Bernard Jeffrey Calloway; December 2, 1974), is an American actor and singer. Calloway is best known for his regular role as Terry Carson on The Ms. Pat Show (2021–present).

== Filmography ==
=== Film ===
Year	Title	Role	Notes
2009	The Taking of Pelham 123	Officer Moran	
2012	Man on a Ledge	Detective	
2013	Big Words	Bubby	
2015	The Girl Is in Trouble	Dre	
2015	Anesthesia	Cedar	
2016	The Breaks	Gordy Charlton	TV movie
2021	The Acolyte	Magus	Short

=== Television ===
Year	Title	Role	Notes
2003	Law & Order: Special Victims Unit	Guard #1	Episode: "Rotten"
2003	Law & Order	Corrections Officer	Episode: "Absentia"
2004	Rescue Me	Larry	Episode: "Kansas"
2005	Law & Order: Criminal Intent	HS Agent Rollins	Episode: "Saving Face"
2011	Person of Interest	Dawyne	Episode: "Number Crunch"
2012	Great Performances	Delray Jones	Episode: "Memphis"
2012	White Collar	Tony the Limo Driver	Episode: "Parting Shots"
2015	Law & Order: Special Victims Unit	EMT Himes	Episode: "Padre Sandunguero"
2015	High Maintenance	Mr. Softee	Episode: "Sufjan"
2015	The Good Wife	Tom Jesse	Episode: "Bond"
2015	Blue Bloods	Michael Hicks	Episode: "All the News That's Fit to Click"
2016	Elementary	Vince	Episode: "Miss Taken"
2016	Luke Cage	Detective Dorsey	Episode: "Take It Personal"
2017	The Breaks	Gordy Charlton	Recurring Cast
2019	City on a Hill	Captain Shag Lewis	Recurring Cast: Season 1
2019	Wu-Tang: An American Saga	Rodney	Episode: "Labels"
2021	The Crew	Ed	Episode: "You Seem Like a Perfectly Serviceable Woman"
2021	The Equalizer	Charles Simms	Episode: "Leverage"
2021–present	The Ms. Pat Show	Terry Carson	Main Cast
2022	Law & Order	Attorney Marcus Wallace	Episode: "Vicious Cycle"
