= Marcel Simoneau =

Canadian & American Actor

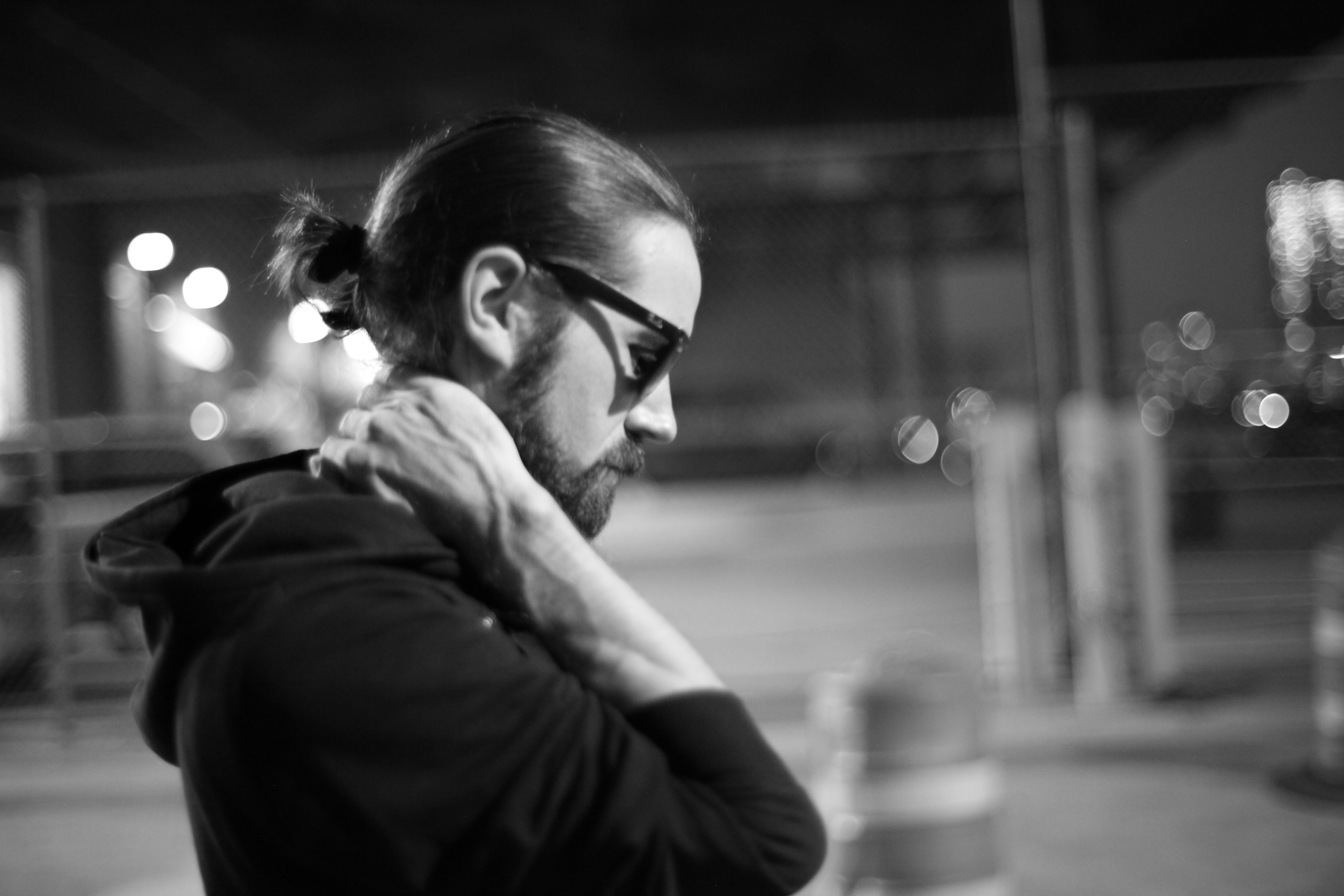
- Simoneau in Brooklyn, New York
- Born: June 22, 1978 (age 48); Quebec, Canada
- Occupations: Actor, Musician, Director
- Years active: 1998-present
- Notable work: Blacklist, Law & Order, Daily Show, Emily in Paris, God Friended Me, Gotham, Unbreakable Kimmy Schmidt, Kinsey, Nick & Norah's Infinite Playlist, The Rebound, Ed, Strangers with Candy.
- Children: 1
- Website: www.marcelsimoneau.com

Marcel Simoneau (born June 22, 1978 in Quebec, Canada) is a New York City based actor who has appeared on TV in: The Blacklist, Daily Show, God Friended Me, Gotham, Unbreakable Kimmy Schmidt, Fringe, Law & Order, Ed and Strangers with Candy. He has also appeared in the films: The Rebound, Zenith, Nick & Norah's Infinite Playlist, Stranger and Kinsey.

Marcel also has done extensive Voice-Over work in commercials for Budweiser, Canada Dry, NyQuill, GoDaddy, Goody, Chloe, BDO, MFS among others and in TV & Film: Little Women, Emily in Paris, The Queen's Gambit, The Marvelous Mrs. Maisel, Wildlife, High Maintenance, Super Troopers 2, What Just Happened, Royal Pains and The Pirates of Somalia.

His band, Hot Seconds, can also be heard in the TV shows: Shameless, The Unit, The Big Bang Theory, New Girl, Gossip Girl and The Office.

He studied at The Lee Strasberg Theatre Institute, NYU, Columbia University and the Maggie Flanigan Studio.

He currently teaches Method Acting at the Lee Strasberg Theater Institute and at New York University (NYU).

== Filmography ==
=== Film ===
| Year | Title | Role | Notes |
|---|---|---|---|
| 2002 | American Adobo | Sal | |
| 2002 | Meridian | Tristan | |
| 2004 | Kinsey | Student #2 | |
| 2006 | Seduction | Dylan | |
| 2007 | Valentines | Actor | |
| 2007 | Jesse & Jill | Jesse | |
| 2008 | Nick and Norah's Infinite Playlist | Drunk Kid | |
| 2008 | Coney Island's for the Birds | Production Assistant | |
| 2009 | The Rebound | Henri | |
| 2009 | Love Seat | Guillaume | |
| 2009 | Stranger | Nate | |
| 2010 | Zenith | Clerk | |
| 2010 | The Imperialists Are Still Alive! | Hipster | |
| 2010 | Elva Snow | Actor | |
| 2010 | Pieces of You | Actor | Director, Editor, Producer |
| 2010 | The Killer of a Cafe Owner | George | |
| 2010 | Visiting Friends | Mathieu | |
| 2011 | Fantastic Plastic | Actor | |
| 2011 | Green Plastic Sandals | Ben | |
| 2011 | Pour Me a Drink & Tell Me a Love Story | Mason | |
| 2011 | The Portrait | Pierre | |
| 2011 | This is the Girl | The Actor | |
| 2013 | Rabbit Stories | Manidas | |
| 2013 | Sunday Sunday | Sam | |
| 2014 | Together We Fall | Adam | |
| 2014 | Trapped Girl | Jason | |
| 2014 | Universal Language | Actor | Producer |
| 2015 | Marcus and the Dead Pet | Bill | |
| 2016 | Like Totally Hot Couple Seeking Same | Karl "Monkey" | Co-Directed with Kirsten Russell. |
| 2016 | Sarah Is Not Her Name | Tim | Producer |
| 2017 | Lurker | Marston | Director, Producer |
| 2017 | Thru: The Hereafter Remains Unknown | Mark | |
| 2017 | Xposure Chapter 1 | James | |
| 2020 | Let's Let Go | Lead | Director, Editor |
| 2020 | She Has Your Eyes | Nick | |
| 2020 | Drowning Silence | Lead | Producer, Editor |
| 2020 | Stay Don't Go | Adam | |
| 2020 | Racket Racket | Keith | |
| 2020 | Janus | Todd | |
| 2021 | Untitled Sam Bennett Project | Nick | Producer |
| 2021 | It's All a Game | Actor | |
| 2021 | On the House | Man | |
| 2022 | Together Alone | Father | |
| 2022 | Hologramme | Jean-Luc | Wrote, Directed, Produced, Edited |
| 2023 | I Think I'm Sick | Will's Father | |
| 2023 | Cord | Jeff | |
| 2024 | Love, Rehearsed | Charles | |
| 2025 | Fly | Franklyn | |
| 2025 | Palette | William | |
| 2025 | ksms | Adam | |
| 2025 | Outlet | Marty | |
| 2026 | Cuts | Adam | |
| 2026 | Coasting | Mark | |
| 2026 | In Your Dreams | Richard | |
| 2026 | Outside | Father | |
| 2026 | Coyotes | Dad | |
| 2026 | Monsters Don't Bleed | Mark Collins | |
| 2026 | Elements of Endearment | Marcel | |
| 2026 | The One | Bill | |
| 2026 | L'Inconvénient | Surintendant | |
| 2026 | The Unsaid | Detective John Davis | Directed, Produced & Edited |

=== Television ===
| Year | Show | Role | Notes |
|---|---|---|---|
| 2000 | Strangers with Candy | Troubled Youth | Episode 3.7 |
| 2001 | Ed | Fake Phil | Episode 12.6 |
| 2002 | Law & Order | Shane | Episode 13.3 |
| 2003 | Law & Order | Dany Payton | Episode 13.10 |
| 2008 | Fringe | Bethany's Co-Worker | Episode 1.5 |
| 2009 | Great Performances | Hughes Panassie | Season 37, Episode 24 |
| 2016 | Unbreakable Kimmy Schmidt | Alphonse | Episode 2.3 |
| 2016 | Gotham | Gilzean's Henchman | Episode 2.15 |
| 2019 | God Friended Me | Manager | Episode 2.2 |
| 2021 | The Blacklist | Stephan Gervais | Episode 8.7 |
| 2022 | Law & Order | Ryan Bell | Episode 21.1 |
| 2023 | Mythic Quest | Jacques | Episode 3.10 |
| 2023 | Daily Show | Dad | Episode 28.104 |
| 2024 | Them | Luke | Episode 1.1 |
| 2026 | Indéfendables | Carl Perrin | Episode 5.508 |
| 2026 | Newborn | Trevor | 8 Episodes |

=== Voiceover / ADR ===
| Year | Show | Role | Notes |
|---|---|---|---|
| 2008 | What Just Happened | Voice Over | Feature Film |
| 2016 | High Maintenance | Voice Over | S1.Ep.3 |
| 2017 | The Pirates of Somalia | Voice Over | Feature Film |
| 2018 | The Marvelous Mrs. Maisel | Voice Over | Episode 2.1 |
| 2018 | Super Troopers 2 | Voice Over | Feature Film |
| 2018 | Wildlife | Voice Over | Feature Film |
| 2019 | Little Women | Voice Over | Feature Film |
| 2020 | Emily in Paris | Voice Over | S.1 - 10 Episodes |
| 2020 | The Queen's Gambit | Voice Over | Episode 1.6 |
| 2020 | Dash & Lily | Voice Over | Episode 1.1 & 1.4 |
| 2021 | Stillwater | Voice Over | Feature Film |
| 2021 | Emily in Paris | Voice Over | S.2 - 10 Episodes |
| 2021 | Birds of Paradise | Voice Over | Feature Film |
| 2021 | Mythic Quest: Raven's Banquet | Voice Over | Episode 2.9 |
| 2021 | Halston | Voice Over | Episode 1.2 |
| 2022 | The Munsters | Voice Over | Feature Film |
| 2022 | Emily in Paris | Voice Over | S.3 - 10 Episodes |
| 2022 | Mythic Quest: Raven's Banquet | Voice Over | Episode 3.1 |
| 2023 | Extrapolations | Voice Over | Episode 2.1 |
| 2023 | Blacklist | Voice Over | Episode 10.17 |
| 2023 | Mythic Quest: Raven's Banquet | Voice Over | Episode 3.10 |
| 2024 | Godzilla x Kong: The New Empire | Voice Over | Feature Film |
| 2024 | Emily in Paris | Voice Over | S.4 - 10 Episodes |
| 2025 | NCIS: Tony & Ziva | Voice Over | S1.E9 & E10 |
| 2025 | Emily in Paris | Voice Over | S.5 - 10 Episodes |
| 2026 | The Devil Wears Prada 2 | Voice Over | Feature Film |
| 2026 | Matchbox: The Movie | Voice Over | Feature Film |

=== Director ===
| Year | Title | Role | Notes |
|---|---|---|---|
| 2002 | The Frank Zip Story | Director | Also Shot, Produced and Edited. |
| 2011 | The Latest Show | Director | 3 episodes |
| 2012 | Two People He Never Saw | Co-Director with Kevin Corrigan | Official Selection 2013 RiverRun Film Festival Official Selection 2013 Bend Film Festival Official Selection 2013 NY Shortfest Official Selection 2013 Big Apple Film Festival Official Selection 2013 Bushwick Film Festival Official Selection 2013 Nitehawk Shorts Festival |
| 2014 | Le Village | Director | WINNER Best Fiction 2014 Fantasia International FF WINNER Rising Star 2015 Canada Int. FF Official Selection 2014 Fantasia International FF Official Selection 2014 Hollyshorts Official Selection 2014 RiverRun FF Official Selection 2014 Beverly Hills Int. FF Official Selection 2014 NY Shortfest Official Selection 2014 Pasadena Int. FF Official Selection 2014 Carousel du Film Official Selection 2014 Festival de Cinéma de la Ville de Québec Official Selection 2014 Les Percéides FF Official Selection 2014 Bushwick Film Festival Official Selection 2014 Nitehawk Shorts Festival Official Selection 2014 Strasberg Film Festival Official Selection 2014 Whistler Film Festival Official Selection 2015 Canada International FF |
| 2016 | Like Totally Hot Couple Seeking Same | Co Director | Also Acted, Produced. |
| 2017 | Lurker | Director | Also Wrote, Acted, Produced, Edited. Official Selection 2017 NY Shortfest Official Selection 2017 Cannes Short Film Corner Official Selection 2017 HollyShorts Monthly Series Official Selection 2017 Macabre Film Festival |
| 2020 | Drowning Silence | Co-Director with Xavi Ocean | Also Wrote, Produced, Edited |
| 2022 | Hologramme | Director | Also Wrote, Produced, Edited |
| 2026 | The Unsaid | Director | Also Produced, Edited |

=== Producer ===
| Year | Title | Role | Notes |
|---|---|---|---|
| 2002 | ''The Frank Zip Story | Producer | Also Shot, Directed and Edited. |
| 2011 | The Latest Show | Producer | 3 episodes |
| 2012 | Two People He Never Saw | Producer | Also Directed. |
| 2014 | Universal Language | Producer and Lead Actor | WINNER Best Founders Award 2014 Anchorage International FF WINNER Festival Prize Emerge FF WINNER Stand-Out Award 2014 Hell's Half Mile Film and Music Festival WINNER Audience Choice Award 2014 Macon Film Festival WINNER Audience Choice Award 2014 White Sands International FF Official Selection 2014 Anchorage International FF Official Selection 2014 Emerge FF Official Selection 2014 Hell's Half Mile Film and Music Festival Official Selection 2014 Macon Film Festival Official Selection 2014 Anchorage International FF |
| 2014 | Le Village | Producer | Also Directed. |
| 2016 | Like Totally Hot Couple Seeking Same | Co Director with Kirsten Russell | Also Acted and Co-Directed |
| 2016 | So You Wanna Be Cool | Associate Producer | |
| 2016 | Sarah Is Not Her Name | Producer | Also Acted |
| 2017 | Lurker | Producer | Also Wrote, Acted, Produced, Edited. |
| 2017 | Cover | Producer | Also First Assistant Director. |
| 2020 | Drowning Silence | Producer | Also Wrote, Co-Directed, Edited |
| 2021 | Untitled Sam Bennett Project | Producer | Also Acted. |
| 2022 | Hologramme | Director | Also Wrote, Directed, Edited |
| 2024 | Them | Luke | Episode Pilot. Also Wrote, Directed |
| 2025 | ksms | Director | Also Acted |
| 2026 | The Unsaid | Director | Also Directed, Edited |

=== Music Videos ===
| Year | Band | Song | Role |
|---|---|---|---|
| 2009 | Hot Seconds | Holy Moly | Director, Producer, Actor, Editor |
| 2010 | Hot Seconds | Pieces of You | Director, Producer, Actor, Editor |
| 2010 | Ian Hudgins | nt7 | Director, Producer, Editor |
| 2011 | HolidayHoliday | A Thousand | Director, Producer, Editor |
| 2012 | Lavender Fields | Spiritual | Director, Producer, Editor |
| 2017 | Starcade | Long Limousines | Director, Producer |
| 2020 | Potterfield | Goodbye | Director, Producer, Performer |
| 2020 | Potterfield | Let's Let Go | Director, Producer, Performer |
| 2021 | Starcade | Real Freaky | Director, Producer |
| 2021 | Potterfield | Sweet Little Mama | Director, Producer, Editor |

== Music ==
Marcel was a member of the band Hot Seconds. He also records under the pen name Potterfield.

== Personal life ==
Marcel is the oldest of nine children.
