= Lucky Louie =

- Genre: Sitcom; Slice of life
- Created by: Louis C.K.
- Starring: Louis C.K. Pamela Adlon; Kelly Gould; Mike Hagerty; Jim Norton; Laura Kightlinger; Rick Shapiro; Jerry Minor; Kim Hawthorne
- Composer: Mark Rivers
- Country of origin: United States
- Original language: English
- No. of seasons: 1
- No. of episodes: 13 (1 unaired)

Production
- Executive producers: Louis C.K. Mike Royce; Vic Kaplan; Dave Becky
- Producer: Leo Clarke
- Cinematography: Bruce L. Finn
- Editor: Brian Schnuckel
- Camera setup: Multi-camera
- Running time: 21-30 minutes
- Production companies: Circus King; 3 Arts Entertainment; Snowpants Productions; HBO Entertainment; HBO Independent Productions

Original release
- Network: HBO
- Release: June 11 – August 27, 2006

Lucky Louie is an American television sitcom created by Louis C.K., which aired on HBO for one season in 2006. As the show's creator, writer and executive producer, C.K. also starred as the eponymous central character, a part-time mechanic at a muffler shop.

A first for HBO, Lucky Louie was filmed before a live studio audience, in a multiple-camera setup. Inspired by Norman Lear's sitcoms, the show depicts the life of an average working class family while using spartan sets and wardrobe. Dealing with a range of topics including sex and racism, the series uses considerable adult language and featured guest stars best known as stand-up comedians, including Jim Norton, Laura Kightlinger, Nick DiPaolo, Todd Barry and Rick Shapiro.

HBO ordered 12 episodes, which aired during the 2006 summer season, as well as eight scripts for a second season, before canceling the show in September 2006 for numerous reasons ranging from the nature of the show to network economic pressure.

== Plot ==
The show follows the life of Louie, a working class part-time mechanic at a muffler shop owned by his best friend Mike; Louie's wife, Kim, a full-time nurse and the family breadwinner (Pamela Adlon); and their four-year-old daughter, Lucy (Kelly Gould).

== Cast ==
Actor	Role	Notes
Louis C.K.	Louie	Everyman
Pamela Adlon	Kim	Louie's wife
Kelly Gould	Lucy	Louie's & Kim's daughter
Michael G. Hagerty	Mike	Louie's employer and friend
Laura Kightlinger	Tina	Mike's wife
Jerry Minor	Walter	Louie's & Kim's neighbor
Kim Hawthorne	Ellen	Walter's wife
Rick Shapiro	Jerry	Kim's brother
Jim Norton	Rich	Louie's friend

== Crew ==
Louis C.K. served as creator, star, head writer and executive producer. Mike Royce served as showrunner and executive producer. Other executive producers included Dave Becky and Vic Kaplan. Writers included C.K. and Royce, Kit Boss (co-executive producer), Patricia Breen (executive story editor), Jon Ross (executive story editor), Mary Fitzgerald (staff writer), Greg Fitzsimmons (staff writer), Dan Mintz (staff writer), Dino Stamatopoulos (writer), and Aaron Shure (consulting producer), formerly of Everybody Loves Raymond.

The theme, entitled "Lucky Louie Theme", was composed by Mark Rivers. The animated title sequence was by David Tristman.

Andrew D. Weyman served as the series' main director. Producers on the show were Leo Clarke and Andrew D. Weyman. The associate producer was Ralph Paredes. and the consulting producer was Tracy Katsky.

== Episodes ==
No.	Title	Directed by	Written by	Original release date
1	"Pilot"	Gary Halvorson	Louis C.K.	June 11, 2006
Kim's offer of a week full of sex arouses Louie's suspicions of her motives; Louie tries to befriend his neighbor, Walter.
2	"Kim's O"	Andrew D. Weyman	Dan Mintz & Aaron Shure	June 18, 2006
Having led Kim into uncharted sexual terrain, Louie is asked to rekindle the magic or face the consequences.
3	"A Mugging Story"	Andrew D. Weyman	Patricia Breen	June 25, 2006
Kim tries to turn the tables on a young mugger, but instead ends up forcing Louie into the role of night watchman.
4	"Long Weekend"	Andrew D. Weyman	Louis C.K.	July 2, 2006
With the Fourth of July approaching, Louie impulsively spends Kim's picnic money on an expensive Frankenstein's monster doll he bought over the internet.
5	"Control"	Andrew D. Weyman	Dino Stamatopoulos	July 9, 2006
Concerned about Louie's bad eating habits, Kim puts him on a healthy diet that only aggravates the problem.
6	"Flowers for Kim"	Andrew D. Weyman	Jon Ross	July 16, 2006
After an argument with Kim, Louie calls his wife a cunt, leading to an abrupt end to what was supposed to be a sex-filled weekend.
7	"Discipline"	Andrew D. Weyman	Story by : Pamela Adlon & Louis C.K. Teleplay by : Louis C.K.	July 23, 2006
Louie asks for Walter's help in correcting Lucy's rude behavior.
8	"Get Out"	Andrew D. Weyman	Mike Royce	July 30, 2006
Tina's rebellious daughter Shannon (Emma Stone) walks out of her mother's life and ends up walking into Louie and Kim's.
9	"Drinking"	Andrew D. Weyman	Kit Boss	August 6, 2006
After Louie decides to attend a basketball game with Mike and Rich instead of taking care of his sick daughter, he is arrested for DUI.
10	"Confession"	Andrew D. Weyman	Mary Fitzgerald & Aaron Shure	August 13, 2006
Forced to go to church after pawning Lucy off on Ellen, Louie finds an unexpected ear for his gripes in the confessional booth.
11	"Louie Quits"	Andrew D. Weyman	Dan Mintz	August 20, 2006
After discovering that the only reason he got a raise in his job (and got hired to begin with) was due to the "charity" of his wife and friends, Louie quits and looks for new work.
12	"Kim Moves Out"	Andrew D. Weyman	Louis C.K.	August 27, 2006
Kim realizes that she hates Louie and decides to move out.
13	"Clowntime Is Over"	Andrew D. Weyman	Jon Ross	Unaired
After Bingo the clown doesn't turn up to Lucy's party, Louie is forced to become "Mr. Pizza Box Man" to the enjoyment of all the children. Other families start contracting his services.

== Critical reception ==
Lucky Louie received mixed reviews from critics and holds a Metacritic score of 47 out of 100 based on 19 reviews.

== Home media ==
HBO released the entire series of Lucky Louie on January 30, 2007. It includes an unaired episode "Clowntime is Over". The DVD also includes four commentaries and a look at the taping of an episode.

== Criticism ==
In August 2006, during the show's run, Bill Donohue, president of the American organization Catholic League for Religious and Civil Rights, issued a news release about Lucky Louie, calling the series "barbaric". The release provides a bulleted list of content from the show that the organization finds obscene, from the ten episodes that had been broadcast at that time. In January 2007, Louis C.K. was a guest in studio on the Opie & Anthony radio show (co-hosted by Jim Norton, who plays Rich on Lucky Louie). Donohue appeared on the show as a phone-in guest that day, and C.K. started a conversation with him about his comments on Lucky Louie. C.K. challenged Donohue's news release and accused him of misrepresenting the show by taking things out of context. Donohue admitted that even though the press release bears his name, he had never seen an episode of the show.
