= The Rebound =

- Theatrical release poster
- Directed by: Bart Freundlich
- Written by: Bart Freundlich
- Produced by: Bart Freundlich; Mark Gill; Robert Katz; Tim Perrell
- Starring: Catherine Zeta-Jones; Justin Bartha; Kelly Gould; Marcel Simoneau; Art Garfunkel; Joanna Gleason
- Cinematography: Jonathan Freeman
- Edited by: Christopher Tellefsen
- Music by: Clint Mansell
- Distributed by: The Film Department
- Release dates: 16 September 2009 (Mexico); 7 February 2012 (United States)
- Running time: 95 minutes 97 minutes (European Film Market)
- Country: United States
- Language: English
- Box office: $21.7 million

The Rebound is a 2009 American romantic comedy film written and directed by Bart Freundlich, starring Catherine Zeta-Jones, Justin Bartha, Kelly Gould, Marcel Simoneau with Art Garfunkel and Joanna Gleason.

Sandy, a recently divorced housewife and mother of two, moves to New York City with them to start over, where she meets 20-something Aram, who helps her start over.

The film was released in theaters in several countries in late 2009. It was originally scheduled to be released in the United States on 25 December 2010, but was cancelled due to the film's distributor shutting down. It ended up going direct-to-DVD in the United States on 7 February 2012.

== Plot ==
Housewife and mother of two Sandy discovers that her husband Frank has been unfaithful when reviewing video files from her son Frank Jr.'s birthday party. After a hasty divorce, she moves to New York City with her young son and daughter. There, they begin a new life.

Sandy rents an apartment above a coffee house and befriends one of the baristas, Aram Finklestein. At 25, Aram is unsure what he wants to do with his life, having just separated from a French woman who married him for a green card. Despite having a college degree he is aimless and still lives at home, so his parents convince him to get a second job at a women's center.

Sandy compiles multiple binders of statistics of sports teams for fantasy football. She brings them to a job interview for a sports TV channel and gets a fact-checker job there.

During a self-defense class at the women's center where Aram plays the perpetrator, Sandy unleashes an "ocean of anger" on him. The next day, she goes to the coffee shop to apologize, asking him to babysit her kids. He becomes a full-time nanny for the family and develops a close-knit relationship with the children. A chemistry starts to brew between Aram and Sandy, ensuing in an awkward sexual encounter, which the children come to know about.

Notwithstanding, they start to date and after two months, they seem perfect together. One day, Sandy feels nauseated and suspects she is pregnant. Aram is thrilled and looks forward to raising a child with her. A doctor confirms she is pregnant, but it is an ectopic pregnancy, so will result in a miscarriage.

As they leave the doctor, a fight breaks out between Aram and Sandy, with the latter confirming that she thinks it is ludicrous that they, with a 15 year age difference, would ever be happy together. After the break up, Aram decides to travel the world and experience new things. Sandy is promoted at her sports news job to anchor.

After five years, the two meet again in a chance encounter at a Chinese restaurant. Aram reveals he has adopted a young boy from Bangladesh and is still single. Sandy, who is celebrating another promotion with her children and a colleague, invites Aram and his family to join them.

The film ends as the two hold hands underneath the table whilst their children start to bond, implying that they went on to rekindle their relationship.

== Cast ==
- Catherine Zeta-Jones as Sandy
- Justin Bartha as Aram Finklestein
- Kelly Gould as Sadie
  - Eliza Callahan as teenage Sadie
- Art Garfunkel as Harry Finklestein
- Kate Jennings Grant as Daphne
- John Schneider (cameo) as Trevor
- Marcel Simoneau as Henri
- Joanna Gleason as Roberta Finklestein
- Steve Antonucci as Waiter, Aram's Friend
- Lynn Whitfield as Laura
- Stéphanie Szostak as Alice
- Rob Kerkovich as Mitch
- Alice Playten as Sensei Dana
- Sam Robards as Frank
- Andrew Cherry as Frank Jr., age 7
  - Jake Cherry as teenage Frank Jr.
- Skai Jackson as Museum Little Girl No. 1
- Saadet Aksoy as Turkish girl in cafe
- Michael Chernus as Actor No. 3

This was Alice Playten's last role before her death in 2011.

== Reception ==
=== Critical response ===
The Rebound received generally negative reviews from film critics. Review aggregation website Rotten Tomatoes gives the film a score of 42% based on reviews from 24 critics, with 10 positive reviews and 14 negative.

Jon Frosch, said: "Saddling two game actors with a tone-deaf, charmless script, the film makes recent J.Lo vehicle The Back-up Plan look like Billy Wilder in comparison." Alex Zane said: "These are characters who seem very real. It's their imperfections, not contrived plot points, that drive the story."

=== Box office ===
The film grossed $21,790,414 worldwide.
