= Anchorage International Film Festival =

Film festival

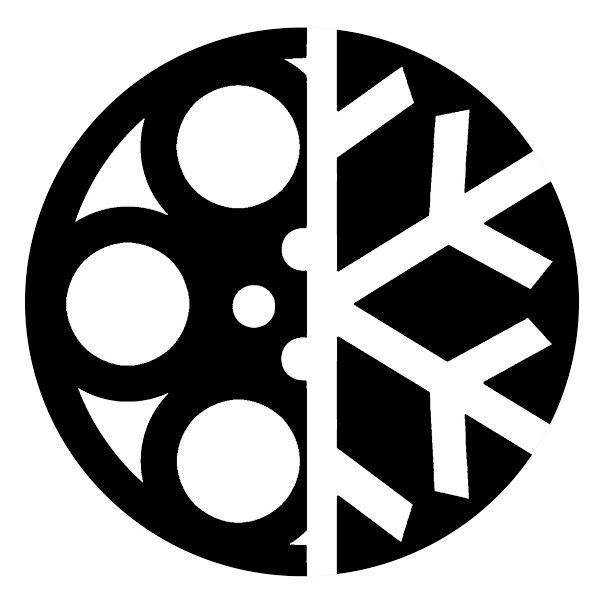
- Location: Anchorage, U.S
- Founded: 2001; 25 years ago
- Awards: Audience & Jury
- No. of films: Ca 100
- Website: http://anchoragefilmfestival.org

The Anchorage International Film Festival (AIFF) is the largest film festival in Alaska. It is held annually in Anchorage. Its slogan is "Films Worth Freezing For."

AIFF has twice been named on lists in MovieMaker Magazine: in 2022 AIFF was named one of the "20 Best Film Festivals for New Filmmakers", and in 2023 Moviemaker Magazine named the AIFF one of the "25 Coolest Film Festivals in the World", both times while Ida Theresa Myklebost and John Gamache were directors of the festival.

Founded in 2001, the festival takes place annually in December. Around 100 films are shown in several diverse categories. As of June 2024, the festival is co-directed by Pat McGee and Adam Linkenhelt.

The main venue for AIFF is the Bear Tooth Theatre, which hosts the opening night celebration and several other films and events throughout the festival. AIFF also screens films at several venues around Anchorage, including the Anchorage Museum.

== History ==
The Anchorage International Film Festival was founded in 2001 by Tony Sheppard.

Since its inception, the festival has grown to become the largest multi-genre film festival in Alaska.

For the 2015, 2016 and 2017 editions of AIFF, the festival director was Rebecca Pottebaum.

In 2018 the festival was directed by Jessica Kaiser.

The five editions of AIFF from 2019-2023 were directed by Ida Theresa Myklebost and John Gamache.

In November 30, 2018, Anchorage was hit with a 7.0 earthquake on Opening Night. The Bear Tooth was heavily damaged. AIFF quickly found a new venue and opened one day late.

== Awards ==
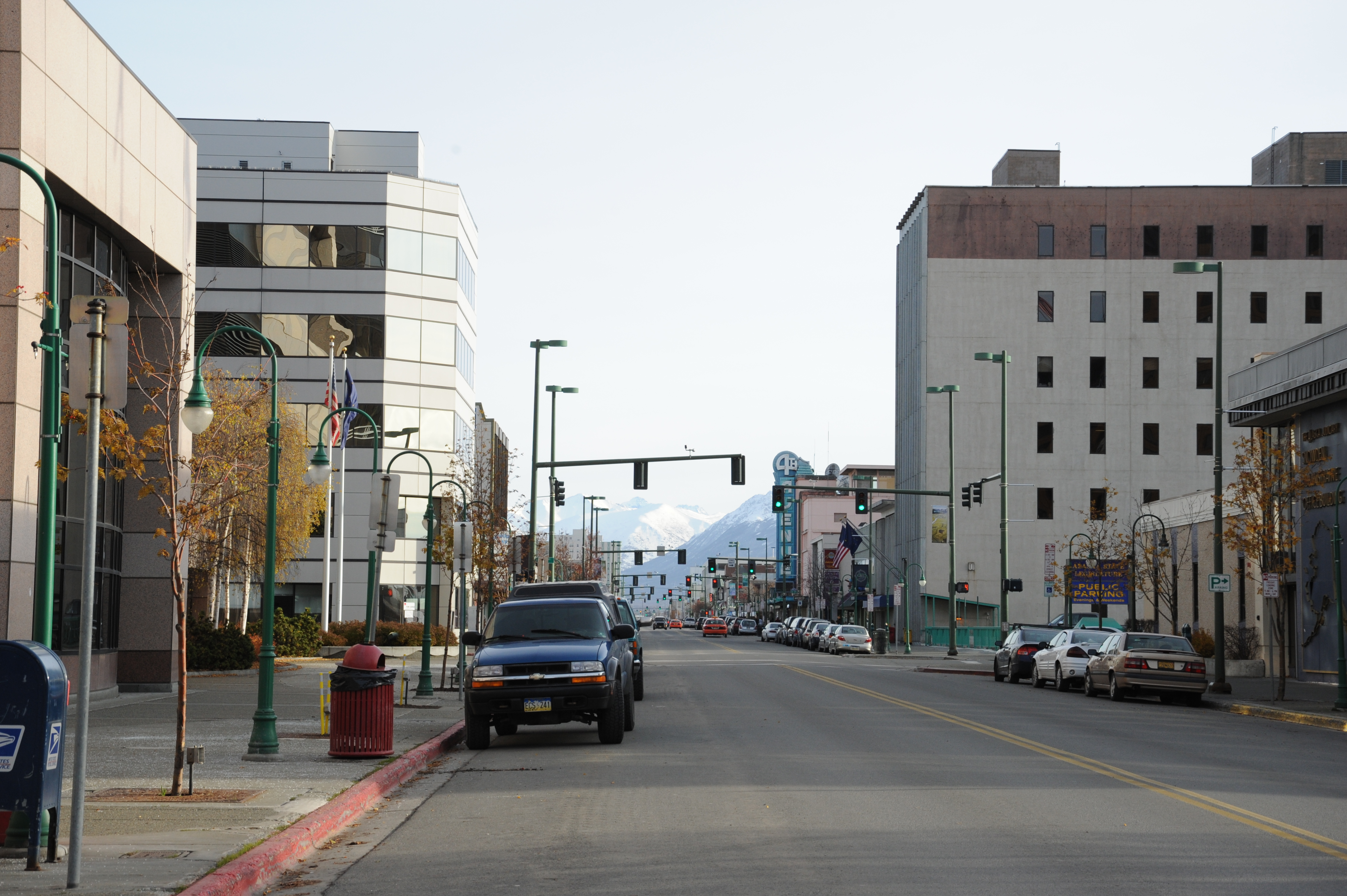
Venues for the festival are spread throughout Anchorage

The awards are in the following main categories:

- Best Feature Fiction
- Best Feature Documentary
- Best Short Fiction
- Best Short Documentary
- Best Animation
- Best Feature Made In Alaska
- Best Short Made In Alaska
- Best Screenplay

== See also ==
- Film festival
- List of film festivals in North and Central America
