= Kelly Gould =

American actress (born 1999)

- Born: Kelly Victoria Gould; August 4, 1999 (age 27); Los Angeles, California, U.S.
- Occupation: Actress
- Years active: 2004–2013
- Relatives: Alexander Gould (brother)

Kelly Victoria Gould (born August 4, 1999) is an American former child actress. She is known for her role as Shannon Clemens on the Lifetime original comedy series Rita Rocks, and as Lucy on the HBO sitcom Lucky Louie. Gould appeared in many television series along with three feature-length movies: Blades of Glory, The Rebound and 16 Love.

At age 14, Gould took a break from acting to focus on social action. She enrolled in classes at College of the Canyons in Santa Clarita at 15 years old.

== Early life ==
Gould was born Kelly Victoria Gould on August 4, 1999 in Los Angeles, California, to a Jewish family. Her older brother is actor Alexander Gould.

== Career ==
Gould's acting career began at three weeks old in a birthing scene. At six weeks old, she portrayed baby Chaz Bono in a movie about Sonny & Cher. She played the role of four-year-old Lucy, the daughter of Louie and Kim, on the Home Box Office comedy series Lucky Louie. (Note: When filming Lucky Louie, she was supposed to say the word "asshole", but she could not be convinced to utter the word.) Gould appeared in the CBS television series The Ghost Whisperer in 2007 playing the role of young Melinda in the episode "All Ghosts Lead to Grandview". She also has appeared in feature films, including the 2007 comedy Blades of Glory, and the 2009 film The Rebound in which she co-starred as one of Catherine Zeta-Jones' children.

She co-starred in the role of Shannon Clemens on the Lifetime original series Rita Rocks from 2008 to 2009. Scott D. Pierce of Deseret News said this about Gould's performance on Rita Rocks: "9-year-old Shannon (Kelly Gould) is one of those too-cutesy-to-be-true sitcom kids."

In 2009, Gould appeared in the Lifetime channel television series Drop Dead Diva. She played the role of Rosie, Emma Ross's friend, in several episodes of the Disney Channel comedy series Jessie in 2012–2013. When Gould turned 14, she decided to take a hiatus from acting to focus on college and indicated that she might resume it after graduating.

== Filmography ==
Television and film roles
| Year | Title | Role | Notes |
|---|---|---|---|
| 2004 | Strong Medicine | Molly Molika | Episode: "Cinderella in Scrubs" |
| 2005 | Jake in Progress | Kid #1 | Episode: "Desperate Houseguy" |
| 2006–2007 | Lucky Louie | Lucy | Main role |
| 2007 | Hannah Montana | Little Girl | Episode: "My Best Friend's Boyfriend" |
| 2007 | Ghost Whisperer | Young Melinda | Episode: "All Ghosts Lead to Grandview" |
| 2007 | Blades of Glory | Maddy | Film |
| 2008 | Cold Case | Mia Ross | Episode: "Sabotage" |
| 2008–2009 | Rita Rocks | Shannon Clemens | Main role |
| 2009 | Drop Dead Diva | N/A | unknown episode |
| 2009 | The Rebound | Sadie | Film |
| 2010 | Den Brother | Rachel | Disney Channel Original Movie |
| 2011 | Good Luck Charlie | Heather | Episode: "PJ in the City" |
| 2012 | 16-Love | Ellen | Film |
| 2012–2013 | Jessie | Rosie | 3 episodes |
