= Ms. Pat =

American comedian and actress (born 1972)

- Born: Patricia Williams; April 2, 1972 (age 54); Atlanta, Georgia, U.S.
- Education: General Educational Development
- Occupations: Comedian, actress, podcast host
- Years active: 2002–present
- Television: The Ms. Pat Show
- Children: 8

Comedy career
- Medium: Stand-up; books; podcasts
- Genres: Observational comedy; blue comedy; surreal humor; black comedy
- Subjects: News; public figures; human interaction; human behavior; social awkwardness; sex
- Website: mspatcomedy.com

Patricia Williams Lee (born April 2, 1972), better known by her stage name Ms. Pat, is an American stand-up comedian and actress best known as the lead and namesake of The Ms. Pat Show. She is host of the podcast The Patdown with Ms. Pat.

== Career ==
=== Comedy ===
Ms. Pat started doing comedy after being encouraged by her caseworker. She did her first stand-up in Atlanta in 2002. Her career as a comic advanced to the next stage in 2006, after she moved to Indianapolis, where she improved her comedic skills at Morty's, a well-known comic store.

In 2015, she participated in the ninth season of NBC's Last Comic Standing.

Ms. Pat has appeared on popular shows and podcasts hosted by Kevin Hart, Marc Maron, Joe Rogan, Eddie Ifft, Bert Kreischer, Joey "CoCo" Diaz, Bobby Lee and Ari Shaffir. She is also a frequent guest talent on the comedy program titled The Bob & Tom Show.

In 2017, she released her first stand-up album, Rabbit. In 2018, she appeared in Netflix's stand-up series The Degenerates. On February 8, 2022, Netflix released her hour-long comedy special, "Ms. Pat: Y'all Wanna Hear Something Crazy?"

=== TV shows ===
The Ms. Pat Show, a sitcom based on her life, was picked up by the premium streaming service BET+ in October 2020 after getting dropped by Hulu and premiered on August 12, 2021. Stage actor J. Bernard Calloway plays her husband and Tami Roman plays her sister. Its first season consists of 10 episodes. The series was renewed for a second season on September 2, 2021.

Ms. Pat Settles It, a comedic arbitration-based reality court show hosted by Ms. Pat premiered October 18, 2023, on BET.

In 2026, she signed an overall deal with BET Studios.

=== Author ===
She is the co-author of Rabbit: The Autobiography of Ms. Pat, a comical autobiography detailing her turbulent upbringing. The book was a finalist for the NAACP Image Award for Outstanding Literature in 2018.

=== Podcast host ===
In 2019, Ms. Pat began hosting a podcast available on YouTube titled The Patdown with Ms. Pat. In the podcast, Ms. Pat discuses day-to-day issues with her co-hosts, sometimes telling stories of her lived experiences which raise awareness of racial prejudice.

== Personal life ==
Patricia Williams was born in Atlanta, Georgia, on April 2, 1972. Her mother, Mildred, was an alcoholic and would often neglect and verbally abuse her kids. Williams gave birth to her first child, Ashley, at 14 and her second, Nikia, at 15. The father of her first two children was eight years older; he began sexually abusing her when she was 12 years old. Earlier in childhood, she also suffered sexual abuse from one of her mother's boyfriends. At age 15, she began selling crack cocaine in Atlanta, while supporting herself and her two children using the street name "Rabbit".

She is open about having two abortions in her teenage years. Williams married her husband, Garrett Lee, at the age of 19. Her two younger children, Garrianna and Garrett Jr., were conceived later in life with her husband. She then adopted four children who are the biological children of her niece.

== Filmography ==
=== Film ===
Year	Title	Role	Notes
2023	Zoey 102	Janice The Jeweller	
2024	Drugstore June	Nicole	
2024	Don't Tell Mom the Babysitter's Dead	Joan Crandall	
2026	Joe's College Road Trip	Pearl	

=== Television ===
Year	Title	Role	Notes
2018	Star	Herself	2 episodes
2021–present	The Ms. Pat Show	Patricia "Pat" Ford Carson	Lead role
2023	Big City Greens	Jessica Burns (voice)	Episode: "Stand-Up Bill/Green Trial"
2023–present	Ms. Pat Settles It	Herself	Host
2025–present	Lil Kev	Tiki (voice)	Recurring role

== Books ==
- Williams, Patricia; Amber, Jeannine (2017). Rabbit: The Autobiography of Ms. Pat. Dey Street Books. ISBN 978-0-062407-30-6.
- Williams-Lee, Patricia; Amber, Jeannine (2026). Ms. American Dream: A Memoir of Making It, No Matter What. Atria Books. ISBN 978-1-668044-21-6.
