= Louie season 2 =

Louie
- Season 2
- DVD cover
- Starring: Louis C.K.
- No. of episodes: 13

Release
- Original network: FX
- Original release: June 23 – September 8, 2011

Season chronology
- ← Previous; Season 1 Next → Season 3

The second season of the American television comedy series Louie premiered on June 23, 2011, and concluded on September 8, 2011. It consisted of thirteen episodes, each running approximately 23 minutes in length. FX broadcast the second season on Thursdays at 10:30 pm in the United States. The season was produced by 3 Arts Entertainment and the executive producers were Louis C.K., Dave Becky and M. Blair Breard. The second season was released on DVD and Blu-ray in region 1 on June 19, 2012.

Louie was created, written and directed by Louis C.K., who stars as a fictionalized version of himself, a comedian and newly divorced father raising his two daughters in New York City. The show has a loose format atypical for television comedy series, consisting of largely unconnected storylines and segments (described as "extended vignettes") that revolve around Louie's life, punctuated by live stand-up performances.

The season received critical acclaim from critics.

== Cast ==
=== Main cast ===
- Louis C.K. as Louie

=== Recurring cast ===
- Hadley Delany as Lilly (6 episodes)
- Ursula Parker as Jane (6 episodes)
- Pamela Adlon as Pamela (3 episodes)
- Todd Barry as Todd (2 episodes)
- Maria Dizzia as Delores (2 episodes)
- Edward Gelbinovich as Doug (2 episodes)

=== Guest stars ===
- Nick DiPaolo as Nick ("Niece")
- Jim Norton as Jim ("Oh, Louie/Tickets")
- Chris Rock as Chris ("New Jersey/Airport")
- Godfrey as Godfrey ("Niece")
- F. Murray Abraham as Jonathan ("New Jersey/Airport")
- Amir Blumenfeld as Young Nervous Writer ("Halloween/Ellie")
- Dane Cook as Dane ("Oh, Louie/Tickets")
- Joan Rivers as Joan ("Joan")
- Bob Saget as Bob ("Oh, Louie/Tickets")
- Doug Stanhope as Eddie ("Eddie")
- Keni Thomas as Keni ("Duckling")
- Steven Wright as Steven ("New Jersey/Airport")

== Episodes ==
No. overall	No. in season	Title	Directed by	Written by	Original release date	Prod. code	U.S. viewers (millions)
14	1	"Pregnant"	Louis C.K.	Louis C.K.	June 23, 2011	XCK02005	1.57
Louie's pregnant sister (Rusty Schwimmer) visits, and she needs to be taken to the hospital during the night as she is in pain. Upon hearing his sister screaming, Louie's two neighbors arrive. After some indecision, one of them looks after the kids while Louie and the other neighbor (Yul Vazquez) bring his sister to the hospital. Though it turns out to be a false alarm, Louie finds a bond with the people who live around him.
15	2	"Bummer/Blueberries"	Louis C.K.	Story by : Louis C.K. & Pamela Adlon; Teleplay by : Louis C.K.	June 30, 2011	XCK02006	1.28
In the first part of the episode, Louie awkwardly scores a "non-date" with a young woman (Kelly McCrann) who has no real interest in him, but a shocking and violent encounter on his way to meet her for a movie leads to a darker, more introspective Louie that appeals to her—until he tells her the specifics of that encounter. In the second part, Louie is approached by his daughter's classmate's mom (Maria Dizzia) to have an emotionless sexual encounter; he agrees to do it, and comes to regret that decision every step of the way.
16	3	"Moving"	Louis C.K.	Louis C.K.	July 7, 2011	XCK02001	0.95
After a comment by his daughter, Louie has misgivings about continuing to stay in the apartment they lived in when he was married and begins house hunting. After seeing several disastrous apartments, he finds the ideal place. Despite his accountant's assurances and his own awareness that it is very much out of his price range, Louie remains committed to the idea of buying it. In the end, he repaints his old apartment with his daughters by his side.
17	4	"Joan"	Louis C.K.	Louis C.K.	July 14, 2011	XCK02002	1.12
After a disappointing experience trying to do a set at a casino lounge, Louie cancels his contract and wanders the casino floor. He ends up watching a section of Joan Rivers's set in the casino's theater, and goes backstage to meet her. She invites him to hang out in her suite, where she proceeds to explain how he should be grateful for his opportunities. As a result, Louie goes and gets his job back.
18	5	"Country Drive"	Louis C.K.	Louis C.K.	July 21, 2011	XCK02007	0.87
Louie and his daughters take a long drive to visit Louie's great aunt Ellen (Eunice Anderson) out in rural Pennsylvania, where Louie mostly ignores his younger daughters' complaints of boredom and has a blast rocking out to "Who Are You". There, they find her actions and vocabulary weird, specifically her use of the word nigger, referring to Brazil nuts as niggertoes. Louie decides he wants his daughters to talk to Ellen without any censoring, but the point becomes moot when she collapses and dies in her kitchen. Louie then does a stand-up bit about Tom Sawyer being a good kid and Huckleberry Finn a bigoted little jerk.
19	6	"Subway/Pamela"	Louis C.K.	Louis C.K.	July 28, 2011	XCK02008	1.02
Louie starts his evening with a surreal trip on the NYC subway, where he witnesses a busker playing beautiful violin music while a filthy homeless man scrubs himself down with bottled water nearby, has a black-and-white vision of himself saving the riders from a soda-soaked seat, and then heads into the opening credits. Later, he meets his friend Pamela for lunch, and he ends up passionately telling her how he feels about her. And she doesn't respond at first, leaving him to misread a later invitation of hers, and the revelation ends with Louie standing outside her building and screaming in pain and anger.
20	7	"Oh, Louie/Tickets"	Louis C.K.	Louis C.K.	August 4, 2011	XCK02009	0.93
The episode begins in a flashback with Louie filming the pilot for a sitcom. After complaining about the unrealistic dialogue and use of Bob Saget as the next door neighbor, Louie is shown arriving home to an unseen and presumably upset wife and their newborn baby Lilly. The episode then jumps to Lilly's tenth birthday. Louie sets out to obtain Lady Gaga concert tickets as a birthday present for his daughter, but doing so means he has to approach Dane Cook, a very successful comedian who is upset by accusations he has stolen material from Louie.
21	8	"Come On, God"	Louis C.K.	Louis C.K.	August 11, 2011	XCK02003	0.73
The spokeswoman for a group called Christians Against Masturbation, Ellen Farber (Liz Holtan), and Louie have a debate about the morality of masturbation on the FOX News program, Red Eye w/Greg Gutfeld. Louie is the only person they could find willing to openly defend masturbation. After the show Louie goes home and masturbates while imagining a woman he had just seen on the elevator (Angela Gould). Then, at Ellen's request, he attends a CAM meeting, and goes out for drinks with her after. She invites him up to her suite, but Louie is denied when he tries to go in for a kiss. Ellen gives a long passionate speech about how nice it would be to talk, date a long time before a kiss (but not "making out"), then finally getting to see her in her underwear on their wedding night. He later plans to masturbate again at home, but gets distracted by news about genocide in Somalia.
22	9	"Eddie"	Louis C.K.	Louis C.K.	August 11, 2011	XCK02010	0.64
After a set, Louie is greeted by Eddie Mack (Doug Stanhope), a fellow comedian who started his career the same time as Louie but has never found much success and lives in his broken-down car. He and Eddie catch up after not seeing each other for 20 years by going to the liquor store and then an open mic where Eddie does a very funny routine under the stage name "Shitty Fat Tits" before Eddie confesses his plans to end his own life, leaving Louie to ponder how (or whether) to dissuade him.
23	10	"Halloween/Ellie"	Louis C.K.	Louis C.K.	August 18, 2011	XCK02004	0.73
Louie and his daughters go trick-or-treating in New York City. As darkness falls, they are confronted by a pair of costumed punks. Louie's younger daughter Jane confronts the two men and helps scare them away. In the second part of this episode, Louie sits in on a brainstorming session for an upcoming cop movie. Louie's ideas for the script get the attention of a high-powered movie producer named Ellie (Veanne Cox). Louie is promptly invited to lunch to discuss movie ideas, but ultimately his ideas prove too dark for Hollywood.
24	11	"Duckling"	Louis C.K.	Louis C.K.	August 25, 2011	XCKR2012	0.81
Louie unwillingly takes home Jane's class ducklings for the evening. The next morning he embarks on a 5-day USO tour in the Middle East, when unbeknownst to him, Lilly had hidden one of the ducklings in his suitcase to keep him safe. Louie meets other entertainers (including country western singer Keni Thomas) as well as many various soldiers during his time overseas. The duckling ends up bringing Louie and others good luck in ridiculous and heartwarming fashion. This episode is dedicated to Restrepo director Tim Hetherington. It is the first hour-long episode of Louie, and it was noted that the idea of this episode came from Louis C.K.'s 6-year-old daughter, Mary Louise.
25	12	"Niece"	Louis C.K.	Louis C.K.	September 1, 2011	XCK02011	0.98
Louie waits at Grand Central Station to pick up his sister and niece for a visit. However, his sister surprises him by dumping the niece—Amy—on him and running off to catch a train to Philadelphia. Louie and Amy spend the night in New York together, visiting an indie rock club at her request, after which she asks to see Louie perform. After seeing her enamored with Godfrey's set, Louie attempts, unsuccessfully, to impress his niece by doing crowd work. After the set, Louie is surprised to see Godfrey spark up a lively conversation with the usually sullen teen. When they arrive back at the apartment, Louie receives a call from a Philadelphia hospital informing him that Amy's mother was found "acting irrationally" in a public fountain and that she is being held under observation. With Amy's father out of the picture, Louie volunteers to keep Amy until his sister is released.
26	13	"New Jersey/Airport"	Louis C.K.	Louis C.K.	September 8, 2011	XCK02014	0.57
After a show at Caroline's, Steven Wright pressures Louie to find a female fan to go home with. He meets a woman outside who offers to "show him her pussy" and Louie gets into the car, unsure of his destination. She drives him to her home in New Jersey, where Louie discovers she is married and was hoping to "share" Louie with her husband (F. Murray Abraham). Louie is visibly uncomfortable and the husband, offended, throws Louie out. He calls his friend Chris Rock to pick him up, which he grudgingly does, and the two have a talk about Louie's lack of responsibility while Rock's wife ceaselessly insults Louie (off-camera). In the second story, Louie takes Pamela to the airport. Pamela is going to Paris, where her ex-husband has been staying with her son. She reveals that she intends to stay indefinitely, and begs Louie to move on and stop holding out hope that they could be together. Louie watches her as she walks off toward her terminal. When she is about to step out of view, she turns, waves, and shouts "Wave to me!" which Louie mishears as "Wait for me." The comedian shouts back, "I will wait for you!" and exits the airport with a smile.

== Reception ==
=== Reviews ===
The second season of Louie received "universal acclaim" from critics, receiving a Metacritic score of 90 out of 100, based on seven reviews. Alan Sepinwall of HitFix called it "one of the best shows on television" and Kris King of Slant Magazine stated "Louie is smart, cinematic, and bitterly honest, constantly dancing between revelatory moments and hysterical bursts of humor that are both surprising and touching."

=== Awards and nominations ===
For the 64th Primetime Emmy Awards, Louis C.K. received three nominations for his work on Louie—he was nominated for Outstanding Lead Actor in a Comedy Series and Outstanding Directing for a Comedy Series (for "Duckling") and won for Outstanding Writing for a Comedy Series (for "Pregnant"). For the 28th TCA Awards, the series and C.K. himself each won for Outstanding Achievement in Comedy and Outstanding Individual Achievement in Comedy, respectively. C.K. and Pamela Adlon received a nomination for Best Television Comedy Series for the 64th Writers Guild of America Awards. C.K. was nominated for Best Actor – Television Series: Musical or Comedy for the 17th Satellite Awards. The series was also included as one of the Top Television Programs of the Year by the American Film Institute.
