= Pregnant (Louie) =

- Louie episode
- Episode no.: Season 2 Episode 1
- Directed by: Louis C.K.
- Written by: Louis C.K.
- Cinematography by: Paul Koestner
- Editing by: Louis C.K.
- Production code: XCK02005
- Original release date: June 23, 2011
- Running time: 22 minutes

Guest appearances
- Rusty Schwimmer as Gretchen; Yul Vazquez as Pedro; Roderick Hill as Peter

Episode chronology
← Previous "Night Out"	Next → "Bummer/Blueberries"
- Louie (season 2)

"Pregnant" is the first episode of the second season of the American comedy-drama television series Louie. It is the 14th overall episode of the series and was written and directed by Louis C.K., who also serves as the lead actor. It was released on FX on June 23, 2011.

The series follows Louie, a fictionalized version of C.K., a comedian and newly divorced father raising his two daughters in New York City. In the episode, Louie's pregnant sister visits him, experiencing severe pain, so Louis gets the help from his neighbors.

According to Nielsen Media Research, the episode was seen by an estimated 1.57 million household viewers and gained a 0.8 ratings share among adults aged 18–49, making it the most watched episode of the series. The episode received critical acclaim, with critics praising the humor, emotional tone, and performances. For the episode, Louis C.K. won Outstanding Writing for a Comedy Series at the 64th Primetime Emmy Awards.

== Plot ==
At his stand-up set, Louie (Louis C.K.) talks about the challenges of raising children, especially having to accommodate the necessaries of the youngest child who struggles with everything.

While the girls stay with him, Louie is taken aback when Jane (Ursula Parker) states that she prefers everything with her mother, unsettling him. Later, Louie is visited by his sister Gretchen (Rusty Schwimmer), who is pregnant after a sperm donation. During the night, Gretchen experiences severe pain. Her screams alert Louie's neighbors, Peter (Frederick Hill) and Pedro (Yul Vazquez), who offer to help her. Seeing her condition, Pedro states that Louie must help him in taking her to the hospital, while Peter stays to watch the girls. Although hesitant, Louie accepts.

After getting help from a car, they arrive at the hospital. As the doctors prepare to check on her, she lets out a fart, causing the doctors to dismiss it as a false alarm. Returning to his apartment, Louie thanks his neighbors, saying he was scared. Pedro claims Louie needs people around him to help him, now that he knows who his neighbors are.

== Production ==
=== Development ===
The episode was written and directed by series creator and lead actor Louis C.K., marking his fourteenth writing and directing credit for the series. Originally, the episode "Moving" would serve as the season premiere, but C.K. chose "Pregnant" as the former wasn't edited in time.

=== Writing ===
Part of the story was based on an experience by C.K., who dated a woman whose sister was farting in the emergency room while she was pregnant, and he parted from the idea that he would be in the situation.

== Reception ==
=== Viewers ===
In its original American broadcast, "Pregnant" was seen by an estimated 1.57 million household viewers with a 0.8 in the 18-49 demographics. This means that 0.8 percent of all households with televisions watched the episode. This was a massive 86% increase in viewership from the previous episode, which was watched by 0.84 million viewers with a 0.4 in the 18-49 demographics.

=== Critical reviews ===
"Pregnant" received critical acclaim. Nathan Rabin of The A.V. Club gave the episode an "A" grade and wrote, "The raw, cathartic, strangely liberating closer serves as a perfect bookend to an opener that similarly wrestles with the profound ambivalence endemic in parenthood, especially single parenthood."

Alan Sepinwall of HitFix wrote, "'Pregnant' is a very simple, fairly serious episode – albeit one that's all a long wind-up to a very gross, funny, juvenile fart joke. Louie frets a bit about handling both his girls, his pregnant sister Gretchen comes for a visit and has a heartfelt talk with Louie about being parents, and then she has a medical scare and Louie learns the value of knowing your neighbors. Not complicated, but very effective, and I liked how Louie was able to juggle the gross-out humor of the fart gag back to back with the very sincere scene where the gay neighbor explains the moral of the story to him."

Joshua Kurp of Vulture wrote, "No other show on TV can switch moods as quickly, as effectively, as hilariously, as thought provokingly as Louie, and as long as CK's miserable and wanting to kill his children and willing to have an honest-to-God fart as the climax of an episode, it will also continue to be one of the best." James Poniewozik of TIME wrote, "A very funny and very deeply felt episode, capped off with a fart joke, to start off the season. I enjoyed the eff out of it."

=== Accolades ===
At the 64th Primetime Emmy Awards, Louis C.K. was nominated for Outstanding Writing for a Comedy Series. He would win the award, marking the first Emmy win for the series.
