= Pilot (Louie) =

- Louie episode
- Episode no.: Season 1 Episode 1
- Directed by: Louis C.K.
- Written by: Louis C.K.
- Cinematography by: Paul Koestner
- Editing by: Louis C.K.
- Production code: XCK01001
- Original air date: June 29, 2010
- Running time: 23 minutes

Guest appearances
- Chelsea Peretti as Date; William Stephenson as Bus Driver

Episode chronology
← Previous —	Next → "Poker/Divorce"
- Louie season 1

"Pilot" is the series premiere of the American comedy-drama television series Louie. It first aired on the FX channel in the United States on June 29, 2010, and was written, directed, and edited by the show's creator and star, Louis C.K.

== Plot ==
Louie C.K. is a divorced middle-aged comedian with two small daughters. In his stand-up set, Louie says he is no longer comfortable with anything in life, except from looking after his children. He explains how he volunteers at their school, because no other parents do so.

He volunteers during a field trip to the New York Botanical Garden, which they are travelling to on a school bus. A teacher, named Susan (Ashlie Atkinson), thanks Louie for volunteering and they get on the bus. The bus driver (William Stephenson) asks Louie where he wishes to go because he doesn't know how to get to the Garden. He tells him to go the West Side Highway, while he finds the directions. After they set off, Louie phones the Garden and asks for directions from the highway. The woman on the phone tells him it is illegal to drive a bus on the West Side Highway. They approach a bridge, only just scraping through and breaking a tire, terrifying everybody on board. They pull over in Harlem. Louie angrily tells the bus driver he failed and should care about his work, and the driver blames Louie for their predicament and walks off the bus. Louie puts the darker-skinned children in the window seats, as they are in a largely black neighborhood, which Susan deems offensive but Louie doesn't care. Louie calls his friend, Dimitrio, who sends multiple limousines to bring all the kids home.

In his stand-up set, Louie says he has no optimism about anything in life, especially relationships. While waiting for his date (Chelsea Peretti) outside her apartment, Louie encounters an older naked woman (Kathleen Butler) hiding herself behind her door who asks him to stop yelling as it is making her "feel vulnerable". Louie tiredly says she should just show him her body and get it over it, and she does so while shouting "Pig!" and squealing at Louie. His casually-dressed date comes out of her apartment and sees that Louie is wearing a suit; he explains by saying he has just attended a funeral reunion for his father. Louie tries to kiss her early in the date, and by the time she looks stricken over him talking about being a parent it's clear that they're not a match. This gets reinforced when the date mistakes Louie for an angry man (Jay Oakerson) knocking on the toilet door while she's using the restroom. At a bench by the river, Louie says he is not good at dating, to which she sarcastically replies, "I think you're doing great". He says he is a real man because he properly raises his daughters and asks why he has to impress her and not the contrary. She leans in close to Louie and he briefly thinks he won her over, but he didn't: she just wanted to distract him while she ran off to a waiting helicopter and ended their date.

In his closing stand-up set, he tells a story about putting his dog down and a dream he had later about it resurrecting, coming home, and eventually having to be put down again. Louie takes his daughters to their mother's house.

== Reception ==
=== Ratings ===
The episode was watched by 1.11 million people in the United States.

=== Critical reception ===
The A.V. Club's Nathan Rabin gave the episode a positive "A−" score, saying "C.K plays to his strengths, turning the half-hour comedy into a forum for short filmmaking and incisive stand-up comedy." Max Nicholson of IGN gave the episode 8.0/10, calling it "a bold and unique type of show that manages to successfully blend stage performance and narrative storytelling in a fresh and innovating way."
