= So Old/Playdate =

- Louie episode
- Episode no.: Season 1 Episode 4
- Directed by: Louis C.K.
- Written by: Louis C.K.
- Cinematography by: Paul Koestner
- Editing by: Louis C.K.
- Production code: XCK01003
- Original release date: July 13, 2010
- Running time: 22 minutes

Guest appearances
- Pamela Adlon as Pamela; Bobby Cannavale as Chris; Elizabeth Hower as Trisha; David Patrick Kelly as Therapist

Episode chronology
← Previous "Dr. Ben/Nick"	Next → "Travel Day/South"
- Louie (season 1)

"So Old/Playdate" is the fourth episode of the first season of the American comedy-drama television series Louie. The episode was written and directed by Louis C.K., who also serves as the lead actor. It was released on FX on July 13, 2010.

The series follows Louie, a fictionalized version of C.K., a comedian and newly divorced father raising his two daughters in New York City. In the episode, Louie faces a dilemma regarding his age, and meets a woman at a PTA meeting. Throughout the episode, Louie's sessions with his therapist quickly delve into confusion.

According to Nielsen Media Research, the episode was seen by an estimated 0.622 million household viewers. The episode received extremely positive reviews from critics, who praised the humor, absurdist tone and emotional weight.

== Plot ==
At the Comedy Cellar, Louie (Louis C.K. is approached by a woman named Trisha (Elizabeth Hower) who liked his performance, which addressed sex drive. Trisha, who states she is 26 years old, admits to being attracted to older men. Trisha compliments Louie, but is not interested in starting a relationship with him, also revealing that she is accompanied by another man. Later, Louie has sex with Trisha, stating many facts to highlight that he is old. She leaves his apartment, not intending to call him back ever again.

Louie attends a PTA meeting at his kids' school. The point of the meeting is to discuss a "fatigue problem", something that Louie does not understand. He meets a parent, Pamela (Pamela Adlon), and both set up for a meeting at his apartment, while their kids are on a playdate. Louie talks about his divorce, but decides not to ask Pamela about hers. Pamela compliments Louie as a great father, comparing that Louie's father wasn't around for him. They then exchange their darkest fantasies about their children; Pamela often fantasized about hitting her child, while Louie says that he often thinks of killing himself on Jane's 18th birthday as he feels he is no longer her father. Pamela laughs at his confession and then leaves with her son.

Throughout the episode, Louis converses with his therapist (David Patrick Kelly). The therapist offers weird suggestions to Louie, such as indicating that sex kills a woman and that he has no friends because he is "fat". Later, while Louie opens up about a fear, the therapist questions if he ever thought that a dead person could get an erection, once again confusing Louie.

== Production ==
=== Development ===
The episode was written and directed by series creator and lead actor Louis C.K., marking his fourth writing and directing credit for the series.

== Reception ==
=== Viewers ===
In its original American broadcast, "So Old/Playdate" was seen by an estimated 0.622 million household viewers. This was a 14% decrease in viewership from the previous episode, which was watched by 0.718 million viewers.

=== Critical reviews ===
"So Old/Playdate" received extremely positive reviews from critics. Nathan Rabin of The A.V. Club gave the episode an "A−" grade and wrote, "Louie is about the ravages of age and the difficulty of trying to recreate yourself as a dynamic single man after wasting your peak years of attractiveness stuck in a dying, failing marriage. And it makes that incredibly depressing subject matter both relatable and funny. Though much of what C.K's conquest told him tonight felt like it could have been taken from a dream or tongue-in-cheek sexual fantasy it had a certain ring of emotional truth about it."

Alan Sepinwall of HitFix wrote, "All I'll say is that Louie's dirty talk with the groupie still has me laughing, that I enjoyed the change-of-pace with the visits to Louie's therapist, and was happy to see Pamela Adlon as the playdate mom, even though I disliked Lucky Louie. Also, I'm not sure if Bobby Cannavale had a random cameo because he's friends with Louis C.K., or because they're setting him to return in a more prominent role later." Ian McDonald of TV Overmind wrote, "This week's episode had the most laughs of the series thus far, but it still didn't lose its sincere edge."
