= God (Louie) =

- Louie episode
- Episode no.: Season 1 Episode 11
- Directed by: Louis C.K.
- Written by: Louis C.K.
- Cinematography by: Paul Koestner
- Editing by: Louis C.K.
- Production code: XCK01011
- Original release date: August 31, 2010
- Running time: 22 minutes

Guest appearances
- Christopher Gates as Guy; P.J. Connaire as Brian; Ann Dowd as Nun; Amy Landecker as Louie's mother; Tom Noonan as Dr. Haveford; Sawyer Swanson as Young Louie

Episode chronology
← Previous "Dentist/Tarese"	Next → "Gym"
- Louie (season 1)

"God" is the eleventh episode of the first season of the American comedy-drama television series Louie. The episode was written and directed by Louis C.K., who also serves as the lead actor. It was released on FX on August 31, 2010.

The series follows Louie, a fictionalized version of C.K., a comedian and newly divorced father raising his two daughters in New York City. In the episode, Louie revisits his past, when he faced questions about Jesus while attending a Catholic school when he was younger.

According to Nielsen Media Research, the episode was seen by an estimated 0.760 million household viewers and gained a 0.4 ratings share among adults aged 18–49. The episode received critical acclaim, with critics praising the episode's humor and exploration of its characters and themes.

== Plot ==
At a gas station, Louie (Louis C.K.) goes to the restroom, discovering a glory hole. A customer also arrives and prepares to use the glory hole, until he is called out by Louie. When he asks him how does he know nothing bad will happen, the man replies that he must have faith.

In 1977, a young Louie (Sawyer Swanson) attends a Catholic school, where he and friends question the Crucifixion of Jesus, particularly his suffering. To change their minds, a nun (Ann Dowd) hires a doctor, Dr. Haveford (Tom Noonan), to give a detailed description of Jesus's suffering. Louie and his friend are frightened by the details, especially when the doctor asks Louie to replicate hitting Jesus with the nails. Louie is haunted by nightmares, so he returns to the church and releases Jesus from his Cross by removing the nails. After being scolded by the nun, Louie's mother (Amy Landecker) talks with Louie. Seeing his fears, she tells him that he had nothing to do with Jesus, as he does not need to rely on dogma to be a good person.

In present day, Louie uses some of his religious background for a performance at the Comedy Cellar.

== Production ==
The episode was written and directed by series creator and lead actor Louis C.K., marking his eleventh writing and directing credit for the series.

== Reception ==
=== Viewers ===
In its original American broadcast, "God" was seen by an estimated 0.760 million household viewers with a 0.4 in the 18-49 demographics. This means that 0.4 percent of all households with televisions watched the episode. This was a 31% increase in viewership from the previous episode, which was watched by 0.577 million viewers with a 0.3 in the 18-49 demographics.

=== Critical reviews ===
"God" received critical acclaim. Nathan Rabin of The A.V. Club gave the episode an "A" grade and wrote, "In the past I've called Louie a show about everything. In tonight's episode C.K. stops wasting his time addressing minor concerns like class, race, sexuality, divorce, dating, childhood, and aging and finally tackles something important: God."

Alan Sepinwall of HitFix wrote, "Though there were technically two vignettes in 'God,' the joke about the gas station glory hole was just there to set up the much longer, darker flashback to Louie's childhood and his issues with the Catholic Church. This was one of the darkest, most deliberately non-comic episodes yet, and also one of the most fascinating."

Emily St. James of Los Angeles Times wrote, "In the end, though, 'God' is another very funny episode of Louie, and a great way to send the show into its hour-long finale next week. With all of the other subjects the series has tackled so far, it was obvious that it would eventually get to religion, and I like the show's hyper-specific, very Catholic take on the subject. Louie is best when it's expressing its central character's specific point of view, and 'God' was full of moments that did exactly that." Ian McDonald of TV Overmind wrote, "What was refreshing about tonight's Louie is that he didn't have anything particularly positive or negative to say about religion other than pointing out how some commandments have some messed up priorities. The whole episode was about his experience with it, which I then interpreted as a fairly negative experience."
