= Halloween/Ellie =

- Louie episode
- Episode no.: Season 2 Episode 10
- Directed by: Louis C.K.
- Written by: Louis C.K.
- Cinematography by: Paul Koestner
- Editing by: Louis C.K.
- Production code: XCK02004
- Original release date: August 18, 2011
- Running time: 22 minutes

Guest appearances
- Veanne Cox as Ellie Bormer; Grant Shaud as Eddie Faye; Will Janowitz as Goblin; Kevin Nagle as Giant

Episode chronology
← Previous "Eddie"	Next → "Duckling"
- Louie (season 2)

"Halloween/Ellie" is the tenth episode of the second season of the American comedy-drama television series Louie. It is the 23rd overall episode of the series and was written and directed by Louis C.K., who also serves as the lead actor. It was released on FX on August 18, 2011.

The series follows Louie, a fictionalized version of C.K., a comedian and newly divorced father raising his two daughters in New York City. In the episode, Louie takes his daughters to go trick-or-treating, and also pitches ideas for a producer.

According to Nielsen Media Research, the episode was seen by an estimated 0.73 million household viewers and gained a 0.4 ratings share among adults aged 18–49. The episode received positive reviews from critics, who praised the humor, although some deemed the episode as inferior compared to the rest of the season. C.K. himself considered it the weakest episode of the season.

== Plot ==
For Halloween, Louie (Louis C.K.) takes Lilly (Hadley Delany) and Jane (Ursula Parker) to go trick-or-treating. As the night falls, Louie agrees to let them continue, despite his discomfort with the streets. They are soon followed by a pair of costumed punks, who eventually catch up with them to scare them. Jane confronts the punks, calling them off for trying to scare them. Louie then shows menace by breaking a store's window, which scares the punks off.

Louie meets with writers, helping to re-write a cop movie named Out of Here. The writers struggle in coming up with ideas, but are impressed by Louie's suggestions. A producer named Ellie (Veanne Cox) invites Louie to lunch for some potential movie ideas. Louie comes up with a dark romantic story. Ellie leaves to meet with someone, dumping Louie for his ideas.

== Production ==
=== Development ===
The episode was written and directed by series creator and lead actor Louis C.K., marking his 23rd writing and directing credit for the series.

=== Writing ===
C.K. called the episode "the weakest episode of the season", explaining that the quick shoot of the first segment made for an "odd" experience, while he felt the second segment lacked something, explaining "I shot something thinking it would go somewhere and it never did. It just never meant anything." He further added, "The other thing was that I don't think it matters to anyone that I was trying to be a writer and I hope to make movies someday and this woman dashed my expectation on the rocks. I don't think any of that mattered to anybody."

== Reception ==
=== Viewers ===
In its original American broadcast, "Halloween/Ellie" was seen by an estimated 0.73 million household viewers with a 0.4 in the 18-49 demographics. This means that 0.4 percent of all households with televisions watched the episode. This was a slight increase in viewership from the previous episode, which was watched by 0.64 million viewers with a 0.4 in the 18-49 demographics.

=== Critical reviews ===
"Halloween/Ellie" received positive reviews from critics. Nathan Rabin of The A.V. Club gave the episode a "B+" grade and wrote, "This is one of the weakest episodes of a season that's shaping up to be even stronger than the first. What do you guys think? How do y’all think this season compares to the first? If 'Halloween/Ellie' feels a little weak that's only because the bar has been set so prohibitively high. And we still have an hour-long episode to look forward to. Sweet blessed Lord, Louis CK does not make it easy for himself, does he? And the world of television is richer for it."

Alan Sepinwall of HitFix wrote, "But if this was Louie in a minor key, it was still really entertaining, as 'Halloween/Ellie' linked up a pair of stories about what happens when you push past your limitations." Joshua Kurp of Vulture wrote, "'Halloween/Ellie' wasn't a great episode of television but it was funny enough. That being said, I can't wait for next week's episode, called simply 'Duckling.'"
