= Gym (Louie) =

- Louie episode
- Episode no.: Season 1 Episode 12
- Directed by: Louis C.K.
- Written by: Louis C.K.
- Cinematography by: Paul Koestner
- Editing by: Doug Abel
- Production code: XCK01012
- Original release date: September 7, 2010
- Running time: 21 minutes

Guest appearances
- Pamela Adlon as Pamela; Ricky Gervais as Dr. Ben; Bobby Cannavale as Chris; Nick Di Paolo as Nick; Stephen Bradbury as Dr. Drake; Kate Gilligan as Anchorwoman

Episode chronology
← Previous "God"	Next → "Night Out"
- Louie (season 1)

"Gym" is the twelfth episode of the first season of the American comedy-drama television series Louie. The episode was written and directed by Louis C.K., who also serves as the lead actor. It was released on FX on September 7, 2010, airing back-to-back with the follow-up episode, "Night Out".

The series follows Louie, a fictionalized version of C.K., a comedian and newly divorced father raising his two daughters in New York City. In the episode, Louie decides to train at a gym, which descends into chaos for him.

According to Nielsen Media Research, the episode was seen by an estimated 1.32 million household viewers and gained a 0.7 ratings share among adults aged 18–49. The episode received critical acclaim, who praised the episode's absurdist nature and guest stars.

== Plot ==
After having many weird dreams, Louie (Louis C.K.) is awakened by his girls. He takes them to a park, where Louie meets with Pamela (Pamela Adlon). Pamela thinks Louie wants to have sex with her, and reaffirms she is not interested.

Louie then takes his girls to school. After dropping them, he meets with a father, Chris (Bobby Cannavale), outside school. When Louie expresses his frustrations, Chris offers to train him at a gym where he works. Despite Louie's determination, he struggles with the routine, result of being in worse shape than expected. The exhaustion causes Louie to fall unconscious, and is taken to the hospital. Waking up, Dr. Ben (Ricky Gervais), annoys him before Louie's doctor tells him an horrific diagnosis, which turns out to be another prank from Dr. Ben. Part of the experience is used at Louie's stand-up set at the Comedy Cellar.

== Production ==
=== Development ===
The episode was written and directed by series creator and lead actor Louis C.K., marking his twelfth writing and directing credit for the series.

== Reception ==
=== Viewers ===
In its original American broadcast, "Gym" was seen by an estimated 1.32 million household viewers with a 0.7 in the 18-49 demographics. This means that 0.7 percent of all households with televisions watched the episode. This was a massive 73% increase in viewership from the previous episode, which was watched by 0.760 million viewers with a 0.4 in the 18-49 demographics.

=== Critical reviews ===
"Gym" received critical acclaim. Nathan Rabin of The A.V. Club gave the episode an "A" grade and wrote, "I'm glad 'Gym' was the second-to-last episode of the first season instead of the finale because it felt awfully slight, even with a return visit from Ricky Gervais as the doctor who has apparently taken a Hippocratic oath to fuck with C.K at every conceivable opportunity. The first episode tonight was funny but it didn't rank among the best of the season."

Alan Sepinwall of HitFix wrote, "Louis CK is always playing Louis CK, he always has these two daughters, is a stand-up with the same friends, etc. And an episode like 'Gym' makes it clear just how much this is a series by bringing back Nick Di Paolo, Pamela Adlon, Bobby Cannavale and Ricky Gervais. Other than Cannavale, who only appeared briefly in the first episode with Adlon, all of these vignettes played off of what we knew about the relationships previously, and made clear that even if Louie doesn't have ongoing storylines, it is a series, and with the continuity that implies."

Emily St. James of Los Angeles Times wrote, "The first half hour tonight skewed a little too closely toward that junk drawer approach, though all of the material in that episode was very funny, which saved the half hour." Ian McDonald of TV Overmind wrote, "I was a little excited and a little bummed out when this episode started. It was the first of two back-to-back episodes, the second of which was the season finale. Louie was a welcome challenge to my previously held belief that there’s nothing good on during the summer."
