= Oh, Louie/Tickets =

- Louie episode
- Episode no.: Season 2 Episode 7
- Directed by: Louis C.K.
- Written by: Louis C.K.
- Cinematography by: Paul Koestner
- Editing by: Louis C.K.
- Production code: XCK02009
- Original release date: August 4, 2011
- Running time: 22 minutes

Guest appearances
- Dane Cook as himself; Bob Saget as himself; Hadley Delany as Lilly; Edward Gelbinovich as Doug

Episode chronology
← Previous "Subway/Pamela"	Next → "Come On, God"
- Louie (season 2)

"Oh, Louie/Tickets" is the seventh episode of the second season of the American comedy-drama television series Louie. It is the 20th overall episode of the series and was written and directed by Louis C.K., who also serves as the lead actor. It was released on FX on August 4, 2011.

The series follows Louie, a fictionalized version of C.K., a comedian and newly divorced father raising his two daughters in New York City. In the episode, Louie tries to obtain tickets for a Lady Gaga concert as a birthday gift for Lilly, and he must meet with Dane Cook.

According to Nielsen Media Research, the episode was seen by an estimated 0.93 million household viewers and gained a 0.4 ratings share among adults aged 18–49. The episode received critical acclaim, who praised the humor, scenes between C.K. and Dane Cook, and themes.

== Plot ==
The episode begins with a flashback, which depicts Louie performing a pilot for a multi-cam comedy series Oh Louie. Louie is not satisfied with the dialogue, and he also finds disdain in having Bob Saget as their neighbor. He returns to his house, where it is revealed that his wife barely even sees him. He then talks with a baby Lilly, expressing his feelings about his life.

On Lilly's tenth birthday, Louie gives her tickets to a singer named "Sabrina Bubble". Louie notes that she is not as excited, as Lilly preferred tickets to see Lady Gaga. Louie finds that the only way to find tickets is by talking to Dane Cook, who has faced accusations of stealing Louie's jokes. Louie visits Cook backstage, as he is friends with Gaga's promoter. Cook agrees to give him tickets, but wants Louie to make a public statement that Cook never stole material, even though Louie affirms he never said it. Cook initially opens up about his innocence, although he still suggests he may have stolen jokes. Louie now gives Lilly a gift box, but she once again does not feel as excited.

== Production ==
=== Development ===
The episode was written and directed by series creator and lead actor Louis C.K., marking his 20th writing and directing credit for the series.

=== Writing ===
Originally, the episode would end with Louie and Lilly attending a concert by Lady Gaga, and the series hoped that Gaga would portray herself, with the episode even called "Lady Gaga". The series had to scrap the ending when they were unable to reach Gaga.

== Reception ==
=== Viewers ===
In its original American broadcast, "Oh, Louie/Tickets" was seen by an estimated 0.93 million household viewers with a 0.4 in the 18-49 demographics. This means that 0.4 percent of all households with televisions watched the episode. This was a slight decrease in viewership from the previous episode, which was watched by 1.02 million viewers with a 0.6 in the 18-49 demographics.

=== Critical reviews ===
"Oh, Louie/Tickets" received critical acclaim. Nathan Rabin of The A.V. Club gave the episode an "A" grade and wrote, "'Oh Louie/Tickets' is a curiously lopsided episode but both sides ultimately concern the existential condition of the comedian as a man who tries to speak truth in a crazy, uncertain and often unfair world that has a way of making that noble calling unnecessarily, almost unbelievably hard."

Alan Sepinwall of HitFix wrote, "What I do have time to say about 'Oh, Louie/Tickets' is how honest and self-reflective it was. Though there are some multi-segment episodes where the different pieces feel like they were paired together because they happened to add up to 20 minutes, these all felt of a piece. Louie talking himself out of a sitcom job because of his stubborn integrity flowed right into Louie spending most of his stand-up routine analyzing the audience's reaction to him, and in turn both helped inform Louie's encounter with Dane Cook." Joshua Kurp of Vulture wrote, "On a different, lesser show, one more like Oh, Louie starring Bob Saget, Louie C.K. and Dane Cook would have envied one another, wishing they had what the other possesses. In Louie's case, it's riches and a double platinum album; for Dane, it's to be seen as a comedian's comedian, to maybe not be able to sell out Madison Square Garden but have the respect of your fellow joke-makers. But things aren't always that black-and-white."
