= Night Out (Louie) =

- Louie episode
- Episode no.: Season 1 Episode 13
- Directed by: Louis C.K.
- Written by: Louis C.K.
- Cinematography by: Paul Koestner
- Editing by: Louis C.K.
- Production code: XCK01013
- Original release date: September 7, 2010
- Running time: 22 minutes

Guest appearances
- Ted Alexandro as Flyer Comic; Todd Barry as Todd; Ann Darlington Carr as Karen; Kelly Deadmon as Lisa; Hadley Delany as Lilly; Nick Di Paolo as Nick; Ardie Fuqua as Ardie; Godfrey as Godfrey; Ursula Parker as Jane

Episode chronology
← Previous "Gym"	Next → "Pregnant"
- Louie (season 1)

"Night Out" is the thirteenth episode and season finale of the first season of the American comedy-drama television series Louie. The episode was written and directed by Louis C.K., who also serves as the lead actor. It was released on FX on September 7, 2010, airing back-to-back with the previous episode, "Gym".

The series follows Louie, a fictionalized version of C.K., a comedian and newly divorced father raising his two daughters in New York City. In the episode, Louie decides to go on a night out, leaving the girls in the care of a babysitter.

According to Nielsen Media Research, the episode was seen by an estimated 0.84 million household viewers and gained a 0.4 ratings share among adults aged 18–49. The episode received critical acclaim, with critics praising the performances, character development and final scene.

== Plot ==
Louie (Louis C.K.) goes on a date with a woman, who surprisingly asks him for a second date. They then reveal secrets they kept from each other, such as the woman having a kid, while Louie also reveals he has two girls. The woman is taken aback and decides to not pursue another date.

Wanting some distraction, Louie hires a babysitter, Karen (Ann Darlington Carr), to watch over the girls while he goes out. Louie quickly returns, and is called out by Karen for not doing anything. She angrily tells him to go out and do something. Wandering through the streets, he enters a bar and joins two black comics. They take him to a club to have fun, but Louie leaves after feeling out of place. He runs into the Eastville Comedy Club, where he is granted permission for a short stand-up set. By next morning, he arrives home and pays Karen to leave. After his girls awaken, Louie takes them to eat pancakes for breakfast.

== Production ==
=== Development ===
The episode was written and directed by series creator and lead actor Louis C.K., marking his thirteenth writing and directing credit for the series.

== Reception ==
=== Viewers ===
In its original American broadcast, "Night Out" was seen by an estimated 0.84 million household viewers with a 0.4 in the 18-49 demographics. This means that 0.4 percent of all households with televisions watched the episode. This was a massive 37% decrease in viewership from the previous episode, which was watched by 1.32 million viewers with a 0.7 in the 18-49 demographics.

=== Critical reviews ===
"Night Out" received critical acclaim. Nathan Rabin of The A.V. Club gave the episode an "A" grade and wrote, "I was much more satisfied with the second episode of the night. Louie is, ultimately, a show about aging, about the death of youth and the decay of the human mind and body. Tragedy is never far beneath the surface. That was especially true of a season finale that found C.K's distraught babysitter begging him to go out and get laid instead of staying at home like a pathetic sad sack and setting a terrible example for his daughters."

Alan Sepinwall of HitFix wrote, "One of the great things about this first season of Louie was how unpredictable it was. You never knew from week to week what kind of stories we were going to see, what the tone and style would be, etc. It was unpredictable, and while some episodes like the trip to Alabama didn't entirely work, they weren't dull."

Emily St. James of Los Angeles Times wrote, "At the same time, the final half hour functioned almost like a mission statement for the Louie character and for the show in general. After a season when we've seen so many crazy and occasionally hurtful things, why would anyone get up in the morning to go have pancakes at the local diner? Well, this episode seemed to argue, there are little moments that make life worth living, moments when your kids get up early and make you realize how much you love them or moments when you find an unexpected connection with a stranger or your babysitter. The world may be a dark and depressing place at times, at least on Louie, but there are always those moments when the sun peeks over the horizon, and they make everything all the better." Ian McDonald of TV Overmind wrote, "Louie is definitely a comedy but I really hate called it a sitcom even though there's not really another word to accurately describe it. Louie goes beyond typical sitcom corniness and becomes not only a fantastic character piece starring one of today's funniest comedians, but just great television."
