= Louie season 1 =

Louie
- Season 1
- DVD cover
- Starring: Louis C.K.
- No. of episodes: 13

Release
- Original network: FX
- Original release: June 29 – September 7, 2010

Season chronology
- Next → Season 2

The first season of the American television comedy series Louie premiered on June 29, 2010, and concluded on September 7, 2010. It consisted of thirteen episodes, each running approximately 23 minutes in length. FX broadcast the first season on Tuesdays at 11:00 pm in the United States. The season was produced by 3 Arts Entertainment and the executive producers were Louis C.K., Dave Becky and M. Blair Breard. The first season was released on DVD and Blu-ray in region 1 on June 21, 2011.

Louie was created, written and directed by Louis C.K., who stars as a fictionalized version of himself, a comedian and newly divorced father raising his two daughters in New York City. The show has a loose format atypical for television comedy series, consisting of largely unconnected storylines and segments (described as "extended vignettes") that revolve around Louie's life, punctuated by live stand-up performances. The season received critical acclaim.

== Plot ==
The series is loosely based on Louis C.K.'s life, showing him as a comic onstage, and depicting his life offstage as a newly divorced father of two girls. Each episode features either two stories that may or may not connect thematically, or a longer full-episode story (often consisting of numerous connected shorter pieces), all of which revolve around Louie. The pieces are interspersed with segments of C.K.'s stand-up comedy, usually performed in small New York comedy clubs, mainly the Comedy Cellar and Carolines in Manhattan. The stand-up in the show consists of original material recorded for the series, and is usually shot from the stage rather than from the more traditional audience perspective. Sometimes these comedy segments are integrated into the stories themselves, other times they simply serve to bookend them with a loosely connected topic. In Season 1, short awkward conversations between Louie and his therapist are also shown occasionally.

Episodes in the series have standalone plots, although some recurring roles (Louie's playdate friend Pamela, portrayed by Pamela Adlon, his co-star from Lucky Louie) occasionally provide story arc continuity between episodes. Continuity is not enforced; there were two very different characters and actresses that served as Louie's mother in separate episodes. Episode 7, "Double Date/Mom" portrays a very unpleasant woman as Louie's mother, played by Mary Louise Wilson. By contrast, in episode 10, "God", a flashback to Louie's childhood shows the young Louie's mother as a very different woman with a nice personality, played by Amy Landecker. Landecker portrayed present-day Louie's date earlier in the season, in episode 9, "Bully". As C.K. explained, "Every episode has its own goal, and if it messes up the goal of another episode, [...] I just don't care." Some stories also take place outside of the series timeline, such as "God", which depicts Louie's childhood, and "Oh Louie", which shows the comedian 9 years earlier in his career.

The pilot episode includes segments on a school field trip and an awkward first date, with subsequent episodes covering a diverse range of material including divorce, sex, depression, sexual orientation, and Catholic guilt.

== Cast ==
=== Main cast ===
- Louis C.K. as Louie

=== Recurring cast ===
- Hadley Delany as Lilly (6 episodes)
- Nick Di Paolo as Nick (4 episodes)
- Ashley Gerasimovich (4 episodes) / Ursula Parker (3 episodes) as Jane
- Pamela Adlon as Pamela (3 episodes)
- Todd Barry as Todd (3 episodes)
- Robert Kelly as Robbie (3 episodes)
- Hannibal Buress as Hannibal (2 episodes)
- Bobby Cannavale as Chris (2 episodes)
- Ricky Gervais as Dr. Ben (2 episodes)
- David Patrick Kelly as Therapist (2 episodes)

=== Guest stars ===
- Rick Crom as Rick ("Poker/Divorce")
- Jim Norton as Jim ("Poker/Divorce")
- Amy Landecker as Louie's Date ("Bully") / Louie's Mom ("God")
- Adepero Oduye as Tarese ("Dentist/Tarese")
- Matthew Broderick as Matthew ("Heckler/Cop Movie")
- Megan Hilty as Heckler ("Heckler/Cop Movie")
- Chelsea Peretti as Date ("Pilot")
- Tom Noonan as Dr. Haveford ("God")
- Stephen Root as Dr. Hepa ("Dentist/Tarese")
- Godfrey as Godfrey ("Night Out")

== Production ==
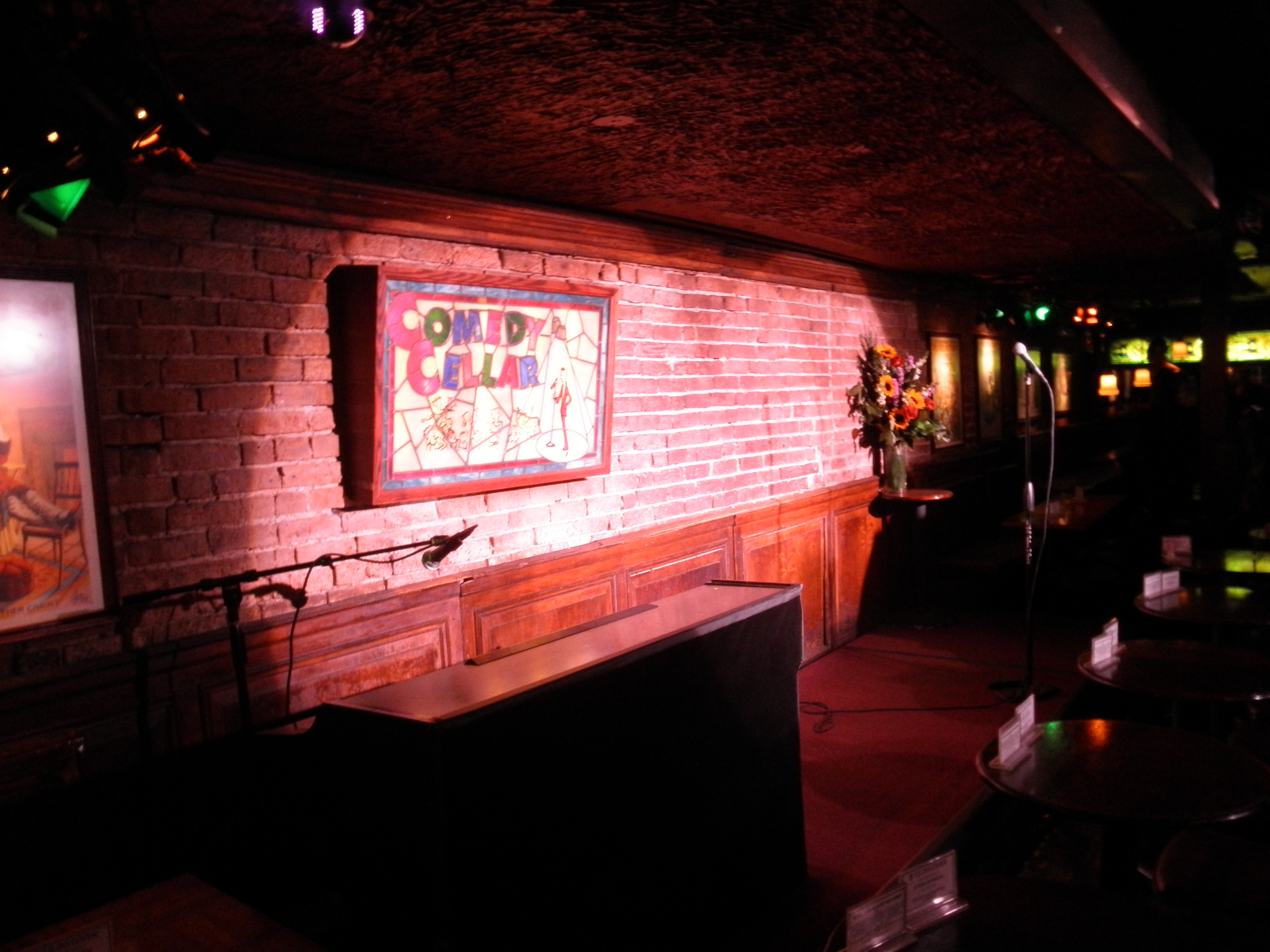
The stage of the Comedy Cellar often shown on the series.

C.K. accepted the modest offer of $200,000 (covering his own fee as well as production costs) to do a pilot with FX over prospective production deals with larger networks because they allowed him full executive control of the show. The show is shot on a Red camera setup, and C.K. edits many of the episodes on his personal laptop. In addition to starring, C.K. serves as the series' sole writer and director, an unusual distinction in television production.

"I went [to Hollywood] and I had other networks offering me a lot of money to do a pilot, and I got this call from FX and they said 'Well, we can't offer you a lot of money, but if you do the show for us, you can have a lot of fun.' He was offering me $200,000 as the budget for the whole pilot and I was like 'So, what do I get paid?' and he was like 'No, that's the whole thing, $200,000...' I said 'Look, the only way I'm doing this is if you give me the $200,000 -- wire it to me in New York -- and I'll give you a show. But I'm not pitching it, and I'm not writing a script and sending it to you first.'"

Production began in November 2009. Louis C.K. said of his show, "It's very vignette-y. It's very vérité. All those French words. I use 'em all." C.K.'s Lucky Louie co-star Pamela Adlon serves as consulting producer of the series.

== Episodes ==
| No. overall | No. in season | Title | Directed by | Written by | Original release date | Prod. code | U.S. viewers (millions) |
|---|---|---|---|---|---|---|---|
| 1 | 1 | "Pilot" | Louis C.K. | Louis C.K. | June 29, 2010 | XCK01001 | 1.11 |
In the first segment, Louie volunteers to chaperone his daughter's field trip along with her teacher (Ashlie Atkinson), which a surly bus driver helps turn into a disaster. In the second segment, Louie goes on an awkward and unsuccessful first date (Chelsea Peretti). Guests also include Jay Oakerson.
| 2 | 2 | "Poker/Divorce" | Louis C.K. | Louis C.K. | June 29, 2010 | XCK01004 | 1.11 |
In the first segment, the conversation during a poker game becomes an intense exploration of gay culture. In the second segment, after Louie's brother (Robert Kelly) depresses him about the finality of his divorce, Louie reminisces about a high school crush (played by Nicole Ehinger), subsequently looking her up on Facebook.
| 3 | 3 | "Dr. Ben/Nick" | Louis C.K. | Louis C.K. | July 6, 2010 | XCK01002 | 0.72 |
In the first segment, Louie goes to a doctor (Ricky Gervais) who's an old high school friend with an odd and disturbing sense of humor. In the second segment, after performing at the Comedy Cellar, he dines with a fellow comedian who harbors passionate political views (Nick DiPaolo).
| 4 | 4 | "So Old/Playdate" | Louis C.K. | Louis C.K. | July 13, 2010 | XCK01003 | 0.63 |
In the first segment, Louie hooks up with a young woman at the Comedy Cellar (Elizabeth Hower) who's attracted to older guys. In the second segment, he bonds with a woman he meets at a PTA meeting (Pamela Adlon) while their kids are on a play date. Throughout the episode, Louie has odd interactions with his therapist (David Patrick Kelly).
| 5 | 5 | "Travel Day/South" | Louis C.K. | Louis C.K. | July 20, 2010 | XCK01007 | 0.68 |
Louie endures a number of typical airline problems traveling to Birmingham for a gig. After the show, he meets an intense fan (Liz Morton) and her intimidating brother (Ben Jeffrey) at a local diner, and a sheriff (Dan Ziskie) who just wants a little appreciation.
| 6 | 6 | "Heckler/Cop Movie" | Louis C.K. | Louis C.K. | July 27, 2010 | XCK01006 | 0.82 |
In the first segment, Louie deals with a heckler (Megan Hilty) during his gig at the Comedy Cellar by making rape jokes about her. In the second segment, Louie is guilted into accepting a role as a cop in a movie directed by Matthew Broderick, but finds acting difficult.
| 7 | 7 | "Double Date/Mom" | Louis C.K. | Louis C.K. | August 3, 2010 | XCK01008 | 0.58 |
In the first segment, Louie deals with the awkward situation created when he's propositioned by his brother (Robert Kelly) to join in a three-way. In the second segment, Louie's unpleasant mother (Mary Louise Wilson) visits to report that she's now a lesbian, but is met with unloving indifference from Louie and injured resentment from Robby.
| 8 | 8 | "Dogpound" | Louis C.K. | Louis C.K. | August 10, 2010 | XCK01009 | 0.78 |
After leaving his girls with their mother for a week, Louie tries to cope with their absence. He initially plans on exercising, but ends up eating ice cream and pizza for two days. Later, he's pressured into smoking pot with his obnoxious neighbor (Josh Hamilton) and decides to adopt an adult dog, which promptly dies. After Animal Control picks up the dog to dispose of it, Louie's girls return and he tells them he had a good weekend.
| 9 | 9 | "Bully" | Louis C.K. | Louis C.K. | August 17, 2010 | XCK01005 | 0.58 |
Flashbacks depict Louis learning about sex as a boy from his father and in school. On a date, he is emasculated by a high school student who threatens to beat him up. He secretly follows the bully home to Staten Island and confronts his parents.
| 10 | 10 | "Dentist/Tarese" | Louis C.K. | Louis C.K. | August 24, 2010 | XCK01010 | 0.58 |
During a stand up routine, Louie discusses topics such as child abuse and abduction. In the first segment, he visits new dentist (Stephen Root) who's afraid of dentists himself, specializes in calming patients fears and sexually assaults Louie while he is sedated. In a second segment, he attempts to court a woman, Tarese, who works at the local grocery store.
| 11 | 11 | "God" | Louis C.K. | Louis C.K. | August 31, 2010 | XCK01011 | 0.76 |
When a nun at his Catholic school feels a young Louie (Sawyer Swanson) and his friend aren't sufficiently penitent over Christ's suffering on the cross, a visiting doctor (Tom Noonan) is brought in to give a graphic, medically specific description of the event, which haunts and frightens Louie. But Louie's mother turns up in a new incarnation as a wise and loving parent who tells Louie that relying on dogma isn't the best way to be a good person.
| 12 | 12 | "Gym" | Louis C.K. | Louis C.K. | September 7, 2010 | XCK01012 | 1.32 |
After an exhausting morning getting his girls ready for school, Louie lets a fellow dad at his daughter's school (Bobby Cannavale) train him at the gym, where he proves to be in worse shape than he thought.
| 13 | 13 | "Night Out" | Louis C.K. | Louis C.K. | September 7, 2010 | XCK01013 | 0.84 |
On an aimless night out that his babysitter awkwardly talks him out of cancelling, Louie decides to break his rut by hanging out with a couple of black comics (Ardie Fuqua, Godfrey). After feeling completely out of place at a club, he ends up going to the Eastville Comedy Club to do a short set, then home to his kids for an early-morning pancake breakfast.

== Reception ==
=== Reviews ===
The first season received positive reviews. The season earned 70 out of 100 rating based on 20 reviews on Metacritic. On Rotten Tomatoes, the season has an approval rating of 88% with an average score of 8.5 out of 10 based on 17 reviews. The website's critical consensus reads, "Acerbic, offensive, and smart, Louie has an air of melancholy that separates it from other pessimistic sitcoms."

The stand-up segments received strong praise, as did the show's perceived "indie film" style, with some likening the show to the work of Woody Allen. Criticisms largely centered on the pacing and low-key delivery of the show's jokes, which often include long setups compared to the rapid-fire punchlines of a traditional sitcom.

=== Award and nominations ===
For the 63rd Primetime Emmy Awards, Louis C.K. received a nomination for Outstanding Lead Actor in a Comedy Series, and was also nominated for Outstanding Writing for a Comedy Series for the episode "Poker/Divorce". For the 16th Satellite Awards, C.K. won for Best Actor – Television Series: Musical or Comedy, and the series received a nomination for Best Television Series – Musical or Comedy. For the 27th TCA Awards, the series and C.K. himself were nominated for Outstanding Achievement in Comedy and Outstanding Individual Achievement in Comedy, respectively.
