= Dr. Ben/Nick =

- Louie episode
- Episode no.: Season 1 Episode 3
- Directed by: Louis C.K.
- Written by: Louis C.K.
- Cinematography by: Paul Koestner
- Editing by: Louis C.K.
- Production code: XCK01002
- Original air date: July 6, 2010
- Running time: 22 minutes

Guest appearances
- Nick DiPaolo as Nick; Ricky Gervais as Dr. Ben; Todd Barry as Todd

Episode chronology
← Previous "Poker/Divorce"	Next → "So Old/Playdate"
- Louie season 1

"Dr. Ben/Nick" is the third episode of the American comedy-drama television series Louie. It first aired on the FX channel in the United States on July 6, 2010, and was written, directed, and edited by the show's creator and star, Louis C.K.

== Plot ==
Louie tells the audience in his stand-up set that he has achieved having the body he wants, by wanting an "ugly, disgusting body". But, he says he dislikes the unhealthy and uncomfortable aspect of having such a body.

He goes to the doctor's office, although he has not made an official appointment, and has only agreed to meet his old friend, Dr. Ben (Ricky Gervais), at 2.00 PM. Dr. Ben finishes with his patient and jokingly pretends he does not know Louie. It becomes clear the doctor has a twisted sense of humor, and he mocks Louie throughout the appointment. When Louie removes all of his clothes, Dr. Ben tells him he has a bad penis; during Louie's rectal examination, Dr. Ben presses his finger in and out of his anus.

Later, after finishing a stand-up set, Louie meets a waitress who says she is waiting for black people, who she presumes will not tip her. Louie asks a black waitress her opinion, who agrees. He eats dinner with the conservative Nick DiPaolo, who disagrees with Louie's liberal views. Louie calls DiPaolo a Nazi, which angers DiPaolo and results in him throwing his drink in Louie's face and getting in a fight, during which DiPaolo gets a cut on his hand. The two go to the emergency room, exchange jokes, and discuss their personal lives. On their way home, Louie apologizes for his remarks, and DiPaolo says he envies Louie's life with his kids.

Louie tells the stand-up audience a story about picking up his friend's cousin, who lived on a farm. Upon arriving, his cousin sees a homeless man and attempts to help him. Dr. Ben calls Louie at his apartment and tells him he may have "big, fat, ginger, ugly-itis". He then tells him he has AIDS, but that his cancer will kill him before the AIDS does. Louie hangs up.

== Reception ==
=== Ratings ===
The episode was watched by 720,000 people in the United States.

=== Critical reception ===
The A.V. Club's Nathan Rabin gave the episode a positive "A−" score and praised Gervais' performance, saying "I could see people finding Gervais’ shtick off-putting. I, on the other hand, found it hilarious". Alan Sepinwall of HitFix praised the episode, also celebrating Gervais' performance and the drama in Louie and Nick's conversations.
