= Subway/Pamela =

- Louie episode
- Episode no.: Season 2 Episode 6
- Directed by: Louis C.K.
- Written by: Louis C.K.
- Cinematography by: Paul Koestner
- Editing by: Louis C.K.
- Production code: XCK02008
- Original release date: July 28, 2011
- Running time: 22 minutes

Guest appearances
- Pamela Adlon as Pamela; Filip Pogady as Young musician with violin; Louis Iacovino as Bathing Bum

Episode chronology
← Previous "Country Drive"	Next → "Oh, Louie/Tickets"
- Louie (season 2)

"Subway/Pamela" is the sixth episode of the second season of the American comedy-drama television series Louie. It is the 19th overall episode of the series and was written and directed by Louis C.K., who also serves as the lead actor. It was released on FX on July 28, 2011.

The series follows Louie, a fictionalized version of C.K., a comedian and newly divorced father raising his two daughters in New York City. In the episode, Louie experiences a surreal trip to the subway, and also decides to profess his feelings for Pamela.

According to Nielsen Media Research, the episode was seen by an estimated 1.02 million household viewers and gained a 0.6 ratings share among adults aged 18–49. The episode received critical acclaim, with critics praising the segments, originality and emotional tone.

== Plot ==
After a stand-up performance, Louie (Louis C.K.) leaves for the subway. While waiting, he sees a busker playing the violin nearby, and also witnesses a homeless person who scrubs himself with water, before boarding. Louie experiences a black-and-white version of the events, where he notices a soda-soaked seat, which he cleans with his jacket. The passengers smile at Louie, until it is revealed to be a fantasy.

Louie meets with Pamela (Pamela Adlon) for lunch, although Pamela deduces that Louie wants to impress her, making it clear she is not interested in him. During a walk, Louie professes his love for her, embarrassing her. He accompanies her home, where he leaves after Pamela asked him to take a bath inside. Outside, Louie calls Pamela again, who confirms that she impulsively asked him to take a bath with her, but now she is not interested. Louie screams in anger as he walks away.

== Production ==
=== Development ===
The episode was written and directed by series creator and lead actor Louis C.K., marking his nineteenth writing and directing credit for the series.

=== Writing ===
Originally, the subway segment involved Louie just observing and not talking with anyone, explaining "I wanted to do a whole episode that just shows me scratching in my notebook and looking at people, and seeing things happen." However, some of the plans changed as the Metropolitan Transportation Authority wanted $50,000 for a specific shot, while C.K. decided to scrap two filmed scenes.

== Reception ==
=== Viewers ===
In its original American broadcast, "Subway/Pamela" was seen by an estimated 1.02 million household viewers with a 0.6 in the 18-49 demographics. This means that 0.6 percent of all households with televisions watched the episode. This was a 17% increase in viewership from the previous episode, which was watched by 0.87 million viewers with a 0.4 in the 18-49 demographics.

=== Critical reviews ===
"Subway/Pamela" received critical acclaim. Nathan Rabin of The A.V. Club gave the episode an "A–" grade and wrote, "I like the casual surrealism of Louie. It represents a secret union between CK's early stand-up, which was more absurd and abstract, and his current autobiographical style. The same is true of 'Subway/Pamela.' The first half, or third, borders on avant-garde while the second is rooted in the perils and pleasures of being a single father, or at least of being 43 and single, in New York."

Alan Sepinwall of HitFix wrote, "What made 'Subway/Pamela' a special episode of this special show was just how much it hurt at the end when things didn't go Louie's way, even though we all knew it wouldn't. The series is too full of self-loathing for Louie to ever get the thing he wants most, even if only briefly. But his reaction to Pamela's lack of reciprocation to his love, and especially his primal scream at realizing how badly he blew it in her apartment, stood out not only because they showed just what a good actor Louis C.K. has become, but because Louie never reacts that way to anything." James Poniewozik of TIME wrote, "There are a lot of great things that Louie does, but it deserves more credit for bringing back the art of the silent film, as in the (mostly) wordless subway sequence that opened the episode."

Joshua Kurp of Vulture wrote, "'Subway/Pamela' ends the way so many other nights have for Louie, with him muttering to and kicking himself for not taking advantage of a good thing, and then telling a joke about how all grandparents secretly hate one another." Garrett Martin of Paste wrote, "'Pamela' was an important episode for both characters, but it was a little light on comedy. It lacked the weight Louie has become known for. It's a fine, understated stand-alone, and it's not like all episodes can be classics."
