= Heckler/Cop Movie =

- Louie episode
- Episode no.: Season 1 Episode 6
- Directed by: Louis C.K.
- Written by: Louis C.K.
- Cinematography by: Paul Koestner
- Editing by: Doug Abel
- Production code: XCK01006
- Original release date: July 27, 2010
- Running time: 23 minutes

Guest appearances
- Matthew Broderick as Himself; Hayley Podschun as Laurie; Gerry Vichi as Simon; Megan Hilty as Heckler

Episode chronology
← Previous "Travel Day/South"	Next → "Double Date/Mom"
- Louie (season 1)

"Heckler/Cop Movie" is the sixth episode of the first season of the American comedy-drama television series Louie. The episode was written and directed by Louis C.K., who also serves as the lead actor. It was released on FX on July 27, 2010.

The series follows Louie, a fictionalized version of C.K., a comedian and newly divorced father raising his two daughters in New York City. In the episode, Louie is scolded by a woman for his jokes, while also taking an acting part in a new film.

According to Nielsen Media Research, the episode was seen by an estimated 0.820 million household viewers and gained a 0.4 ratings share among adults aged 18–49. The episode received very positive reviews from critics, who praised the performances and humor.

== Plot ==
While performing at the Comedy Cellar, Louie (Louis C.K.) is lambasted by a heckler (Megan Hilty) for his jokes, which deal with rape. Louie then proceeds to make rape jokes about her, embarrassing her in front of everyone. After the show, the heckler confronts Louie for his actions. This prompts Louie to explain that her actions derailed his performance, causing her to shockingly leave.

Louie goes to a talent agency, as he will get into acting. His agent, Simon (Gerry Vichi), tells him he got him a part in a remake of The Godfather. Louie hesitates with the offer, and Simon has a stroke while talking. He is taken to the hospital, where he is pronounced dead. Guilted by the offer, Louie accepts playing a police officer in the film, which is directed by Matthew Broderick, who also stars in the film. However, Louie struggles with his facial expressions, so Broderick tells him to take a walk to think things over. He goes to the grocery store, still wearing his police uniform. A robbery takes place, and the clerk tells Louie to help. Louie tries to intimidate with his gun, but is clearly fake. One of the assailants then promptly reveals that his gun is fake as well, causing them to flee.

== Production ==
=== Development ===
The episode was written and directed by series creator and lead actor Louis C.K., marking his sixth writing and directing credit for the series.

== Reception ==
=== Viewers ===
In its original American broadcast, "Heckler/Cop Movie" was seen by an estimated 0.820 million household viewers with a 0.4 in the 18-49 demographics. This means that 0.4 percent of all households with televisions watched the episode. This was a 21% increase in viewership from the previous episode, which was watched by 0.676 million viewers with a 0.3 in the 18-49 demographics.

=== Critical reviews ===
"Heckler/Cop Movie" received very positive reviews from critics. Nathan Rabin of The A.V. Club gave the episode a "B+" grade and wrote, "Tonight's episode of Louie began dark and awkward and just kept getting darker and more awkward until it reached a cathartic release. It wasn't as unpredictable as previous episodes and was much more rooted in C.K's stand-up persona but it was pretty damn funny and compelling all the same. And who the hell knows, next week might look and feel like nothing that's come before it."

Emily St. James of Los Angeles Times wrote, "The slices of life are the best things about Louie at the moment. They make it feel like the show doesn't take place in TV reality but in a weird corner of our reality. For every scene in which Louie has three cab drivers fight over him or watches a date run off into a helicopter, there's another in which he stops to try to have a conversation with a cat or has a frank discussion with a woman he's seriously angered. Louie succeeds through keeping its comic rhythms unpredictable, and the show's greatest strength is the fact that it can go from screamingly funny to unexpectedly poignant in a matter of a few moments. 'Heckler/Cop Show' is a good example of both ways the show pulls off its central mission." Ian McDonald of TV Overmind wrote, "I said that Louie had hit its stride and this week only confirms it. This show is quickly becoming the most consistent show on television."
