= Bummer/Blueberries =

- Louie episode
- Episode no.: Season 2 Episode 2
- Directed by: Louis C.K.
- Story by: Louis C.K.; Pamela Adlon
- Teleplay by: Louis C.K.
- Cinematography by: Paul Koestner
- Editing by: Louis C.K.
- Production code: XCK02006
- Original release date: June 30, 2011
- Running time: 22 minutes

Guest appearances
- Maria Dizzia as Delores; Kelly McCrann as Janice

Episode chronology
← Previous "Pregnant"	Next → "Moving"
- Louie (season 2)

"Bummer/Blueberries" is the second episode of the second season of the American comedy-drama television series Louie. It is the 15th overall episode of the series and was written and directed by Louis C.K., who also serves as the lead actor, from a story he co-wrote with Pamela Adlon. It was released on FX on June 30, 2011.

The series follows Louie, a fictionalized version of C.K., a comedian and newly divorced father raising his two daughters in New York City. In the episode, Louie goes on a "non-date" with a friend, but a violent incident changes his views. Later, he accepts a woman's request for emotionless sex.

According to Nielsen Media Research, the episode was seen by an estimated 1.28 million household viewers and gained a 0.7 ratings share among adults aged 18–49. The episode received critical acclaim, with critics praising the episode's emotional tone, themes and ending.

== Plot ==
In his stand-up set, Louie (Louis C.K.) talks about the feeling of loneliness, as some men are unlikely to go on a date with women.

Louie asks a friend, Janice (Kelly McCrann), to go out with him, despite the fact that she is already in a relationship. She accepts to go on their "non-date" to a movie theater the next day. On his way, Louie witnesses as a man pushes himself in front of a coming truck, killing himself. He arrives at the theater, showing a dismissive nature of the movie, which actually impresses Janice. They leave for a walk, where Louie gives a nihilistic view of the world. This culminates in a kiss with Janice. Louie opens up about the incident in detail, which disturbs Janice and prompts her to dump him.

After dropping his girls at school, Louie meets one of Jane's classmate's mother, Delores (Maria Dizzia). Delores invites him to have emotionless sex with her as she needs it, deeming him as a safe and reliable person. Louie later shows up, although Delores' requests for their session prove to be frustrating. While Louie spanks her at her request, Delores starts crying, repeatedly saying "Daddy, I'm so sorry." The episode concludes as Delores eats blueberries that Louie provided for her.

== Production ==
=== Development ===
The episode was written and directed by series creator and lead actor Louis C.K., who also co-wrote it with Pamela Adlon, marking his fourteenth writing and directing credit for the series, and Adlon's first writing credit.

=== Writing ===
The first segment was based on an encounter that C.K. experienced while walking in the street, where a homeless person was yelling in close proximity, which gave him the idea. The crew used a dummy for the homeless person's body, as well as using a $4,000 head for the scene where he is beheaded.

The second segment was written immediately after the series was renewed for a second season. As C.K. was with Pamela Adlon at the time, they "sort of paced out" the episode, which was suggested by Adlon. On his approach, he said, "Sometimes I start with a voice that feels authentic to me, then I just put myself on the page in proximity with this voice, and then I kind of figure out through writing it why the person is the way they are."

== Reception ==
=== Viewers ===
In its original American broadcast, "Bummer/Blueberries" was seen by an estimated 1.28 million household viewers with a 0.7 in the 18-49 demographics. This means that 0.7 percent of all households with televisions watched the episode. This was a 19% decrease in viewership from the previous episode, which was watched by 1.57 million viewers with a 0.8 in the 18-49 demographics.

=== Critical reviews ===
"Bummer/Blueberries" received critical acclaim. Nathan Rabin of The A.V. Club gave the episode an "A" grade and wrote, "The underlying theme linking 'Bummer', the episode’s first half, and 'Blueberries', its second, is sexual pragmatism. In 'Bummer', that sexual pragmatism is twofold. After the stand-up opening, Louis CK asks a reasonably attractive actress out. He nervously stumbles his way through the process, tongue-tied and self-conscious. On the other side of the phone line, the object of CK’s superficial affections sports a look of cold calculation before acquiescing to going out with CK for purely pragmatic reasons."

Alan Sepinwall of HitFix wrote, "The big, even more disturbing yuks, though, come in the episode's second story, as Louie gets a little luckier with a mom from his daughter Jane's class. That story was a case study not only in how bad sex can exist, but how there comes a point where bad sex is much, much, much worse than no sex at all. So uncomfortable. So funny. And, as usual, Louie's resigned reaction to everything only made it funnier." Joshua Kurp of Vulture wrote, "'Bummer/Blueberries' was an episode about sad sexual desperation, about knowing that you're acting like a sucker but still doing it, mostly because you want to get laid. Louie knows nothing good can come of meeting with, or sleeping with, Janice and Dolores, and yet he still goes through with it, partially because he's very lonely and looking for a conversation with an actual adult, and not his children, but also because, at least with Dolores, he's hoping for a connection."
