= Dentist/Tarese =

- Louie episode
- Episode no.: Season 1 Episode 10
- Directed by: Louis C.K.
- Written by: Louis C.K.
- Cinematography by: Paul Koestner
- Editing by: Doug Abel
- Production code: XCK01010
- Original release date: August 24, 2010
- Running time: 21 minutes

Guest appearances
- Stephen Root as Dr. Hepa; Chuck Sklar as Osama bin Laden; Adepero Oduye as Tarese

Episode chronology
| ← Previous "Bully" | Next → "God" |
- Louie (season 1)

"Dentist/Tarese" is the tenth episode of the first season of the American comedy-drama television series Louie. The episode was written and directed by Louis C.K., who also serves as the lead actor. It was released on FX on August 24, 2010.

The series follows Louie, a fictionalized version of C.K., a comedian and newly divorced father raising his two daughters in New York City. In the episode, Louie has a strange encounter with his dentist, and also tries to flirt with a woman who works a grocery store.

According to Nielsen Media Research, the episode was seen by an estimated 0.577 million household viewers and gained a 0.3 ratings share among adults aged 18–49. The episode received extremely positive reviews from critics, who praised the episode's absurdist themes.

== Plot ==
At his stand-up set, Louie (Louis C.K.) address children's disappearance, deeming that they could be fleeing from abuse.

Louie visits a dentist, Dr. Hepa (Stephen Root). Hepa expresses his fear of dentists despite his profession, also making suggestive moves over Louie's body. While sedated, Louie experiences hallucinations, such as meeting Osama bin Laden (Chuck Sklar) in a desert. He also encounters Hepa, who makes him eat a banana. Louie wakes up, with the implication that Hepa sexually assaulted him while he was sedated.

At a grocery store, Louie tries to flirt with a cashier named Tarese (Adepero Oduye), who is not interested in his advances. He buys her flowers, prompting her to call the manager to dismiss Louie and refund him the flowers. After her shift ends, Louie accompanies her home, even though she dismisses him. As they reach her house, Tarese makes it clear she is not interested in him, telling him he cannot always get what he wants. After she enters, another woman exits her building. The woman takes an interest in Louie, who answers back. They eventually end up having sex.

== Production ==
=== Development ===
The episode was written and directed by series creator and lead actor Louis C.K., marking his tenth writing and directing credit for the series.

== Reception ==
=== Viewers ===
In its original American broadcast, "Dentist/Tarese" was seen by an estimated 0.577 million household viewers with a 0.3 in the 18-49 demographics. This means that 0.3 percent of all households with televisions watched the episode. This was a slight decrease in viewership from the previous episode, which was watched by 0.580 million viewers with a 0.3 in the 18-49 demographics.

=== Critical reviews ===
"Dentist/Tarese" received extremely positive reviews from critics. Nathan Rabin of The A.V. Club gave the episode an "A–" grade and wrote, "Tonight's Louie offered a provocative spin on doctor/patient relationships, 9/11, Osama Bin Laden, interracial sex and white privilege. Oh, and the sexuality of Jewish girls. I only hope that next week's episode finally takes some real chances."

Emily St. James of Los Angeles Times wrote, "There are a lot of good laughs in 'Dentist/Tarese,' particularly in the stand-up sections, which show Louie delving into some potentially offputting territory and emerging mostly unscathed, but the episode itself felt a little too much like a junk drawer of a script, a place where C.K. tossed a bunch of ideas he had and hoped that since they were funny enough, he wouldn't have to come up for a reason for all of them to share the same episode. They were funny, but the episode itself didn't hang together." Ian McDonald of TV Overmind wrote, "Score yet another point for Louis C.K. and FX, because this week's Louie was the funniest of the season."
