= Travel Day/South =

- Louie episode
- Episode no.: Season 1 Episode 5
- Directed by: Louis C.K.
- Written by: Louis C.K.
- Cinematography by: Paul Koestner
- Editing by: Doug Abel; Louis C.K.
- Production code: XCK01007
- Original release date: July 20, 2010
- Running time: 22 minutes

Guest appearances
- Gregory Gunter as Dennis; Kate Blumberg as Martha; Dan Ziskie as Sheriff; Ben Jeffrey as Curtis; Liz Morton as Doreen

Episode chronology
← Previous "So Old/Playdate"	Next → "Heckler/Cop Movie"
- Louie (season 1)

"Travel Day/South" is the fifth episode of the first season of the American comedy-drama television series Louie. The episode was written and directed by Louis C.K., who also serves as the lead actor. It was released on FX on July 20, 2010.

The series follows Louie, a fictionalized version of C.K., a comedian and newly divorced father raising his two daughters in New York City. In the episode, Louie travels to Alabama for a gig, encountering problems at the airport and at a diner.

According to Nielsen Media Research, the episode was seen by an estimated 0.676 million household viewers. The episode received positive reviews from critics, who praised the first half of the episode, although the second half drew more mixed reactions.

== Plot ==
In the stand-up set, Louie (Louis C.K.) talks about the self-entitlement of people, questioning why people feel the need to really deserve something.

Louie calls for a cab, which prompt three taxis to simultaneously arrive. Two of them fight each other for Louie, eventually choosing one of them. He arrives at the airport, where he plans to leave for Birmingham, Alabama, witnessing a man publicly criticizing the airport for not respecting his reservation. Louie gets his flight ticket, but is immediately informed that the flight has been canceled due to a crash where everyone died. He takes a later flight, but gets into a problem with TSA for boarding with a lube. The flight also experiences severe turbulence, although eventually they safely land.

At Birmingham during his stand-up act, Louie is asked to criticize Mobile. Louie ends up insulting Birmingham as well, causing the crowd to boo him. At a diner, Louie is approached by a man named Curtis (Ben Jeffrey) who wants him to meet his sister Doreen (Liz Morton), who is a fan of Louie. Curtis intimidates Louie into sitting with Doreen, who deems him attractive. Louie promptly leaves, claiming he must catch his flight. He is confronted by Curtis at the parking lot, who holds him at gunpoint. The Sheriff (Dan Ziskie) knocks Curtis out and takes him to the station. Louie accompanies him, with the Sheriff wishing that he was given appreciation for his duties, like being kissed in the lips. Louie decides to kiss him in the lips and leaves for his hotel room.

== Production ==
=== Development ===
The episode was written and directed by series creator and lead actor Louis C.K., marking his fifth writing and directing credit for the series.

== Reception ==
=== Viewers ===
In its original American broadcast, "Travel Day/South" was seen by an estimated 0.676 million household viewers with a 0.3 in the 18-49 demographics. This was a 8% increase in viewership from the previous episode, which was watched by 0.622 million viewers.

=== Critical reviews ===
"Travel Day/South" received positive reviews from critics. Nathan Rabin of The A.V. Club gave the episode a "B" grade and wrote, "Tonight, however, was the first episode that felt like an extension of a stand-up comedy routine. That's not inherently a bad thing, though heaven knows there are few stand-up topics less fresh than the irritations and annoyances of air travel. So while tonight's episode trafficked in a lot of rather familiar observations and well-worn jokes, it was done with subtle understatement and a fair level of artistry."

Alan Sepinwall of HitFix wrote, "I didn't love the 'South' half of the episode, as it seemed too easy a joke on Southern stereotypes, even as Louie was acknowledging that he didn't want to view the South as different. 'Travel Day,' on the other hand, was hilarious, even as it made me cringe about what I'll have to endure tomorrow."

Emily St. James of Los Angeles Times wrote, "By doing an episode that feels more like a long series of Saturday Night Live sketches than a series of short, one-scene plays, 'Travel Day/South' shoots the very best thing about the series in the foot. It's not a bad episode of television by any means, but it's the first episode of Louie that didn't make me applaud passionately for the show's gutsiness and wit." Ian McDonald of TV Overmind wrote, "Overall, I thought this episode was fantastic and I truly feel like this show is getting better and better."
