= Duckling (Louie) =

- Louie episode
- Episode no.: Season 2 Episode 11
- Directed by: Louis C.K.
- Written by: Louis C.K.
- Cinematography by: Paul Koestner; Alexander Martin
- Editing by: Louis C.K.
- Production code: XCK02012
- Original release date: August 25, 2011
- Running time: 41 minutes

Guest appearances
- Keni Thomas as himself; Hadley Delany as Lilly; Ursula Parker as Jane; Don Pugsley as General; Lilly Robbins as Jamie

Episode chronology
← Previous "Halloween/Ellie"	Next → "Niece"
- Louie (season 2)

"Duckling" is the eleventh episode of the second season of the American comedy-drama television series Louie. It is the 24th overall episode of the series and was written and directed by Louis C.K., who also serves as the lead actor. It was released on FX on August 25, 2011.

The series follows Louie, a fictionalized version of C.K., a comedian and newly divorced father raising his two daughters in New York City. In the episode, Louie goes on a USO Tour to the Middle East, also discovering that Lilly sneaked a duckling for him.

According to Nielsen Media Research, the episode was seen by an estimated 0.73 million household viewers and gained a 0.4 ratings share among adults aged 18–49. The episode received critical acclaim, with critics praising the subject matter, originality and heartwarming tone. For the episode, Louis C.K. was nominated for Outstanding Lead Actor in a Comedy Series and Outstanding Directing for a Comedy Series at the 64th Primetime Emmy Awards.

== Plot ==
While picking up Lilly (Hadley Delany) and Jane (Ursula Parker) from school, Louie (Louis C.K.) is informed that they will have to take and care for the class' ducklings for the night, as each family is taking turns. Despite the girls' insistence, Louie says he will not keep the ducklings after the next day. He drops them off at school with the ducklings and leaves for a 5-day USO tour in the Middle East.

Louie meets other entertainers at the base, with a military person thanking them for taking their time to entertain the troops. While checking his room, Louie is shocked to discover that Lilly has sneaked in a duckling to wish him good luck. Louie is forced to take the duckling with him as he travels through many bases, bonding with many entertainers and soldiers.

During a trip, the helicopter lands due to a malfunction. As they await reparations, they are confronted by a group of armed Afghani villagers. As tensions arise, the duckling leaves Louie's backpack and roams freely through the land, causing Louie to slip and cause laughter among the villagers. The troop and the villagers soon join each other to spend time together, bonding over the duckling. As the helicopter arrives to pick up the troop, Louie decides to leave the duckling with the villagers as a sign of respect.

== Production ==
=== Development ===
The episode was written and directed by series creator and lead actor Louis C.K., marking his 24th writing and directing credit for the series.

=== Writing ===
The episode originated from C.K.'s daughter taking ducklings to their house after he had been in Afghanistan for a USO tour. His daughter suggested he should make an episode where he takes a duckling to Afghanistan. He commented, "If there's a way to logically make that work, that's going to be a great episode." The producers contacted army officials, getting access to a New Mexico base that could pose as Afghanistan. Due to the episode's nature, the episode cost twice as much as the usual episode of the series.

== Reception ==
=== Viewers ===
In its original American broadcast, "Duckling" was seen by an estimated 0.81 million household viewers with a 0.5 in the 18-49 demographics. This means that 0.5 percent of all households with televisions watched the episode. This was a slight increase in viewership from the previous episode, which was watched by 0.73 million viewers with a 0.4 in the 18-49 demographics.

=== Critical reviews ===
"Duckling" received critical acclaim. Nathan Rabin of The A.V. Club gave the episode an "A–" grade and wrote, "Louie always feels cinematic, but it's never felt quite as boldly cinematic as it does here. Part of that is attributable to time. The hour-long format affords CK plenty of time to stretch his legs, creatively speaking, and simply watch his characters live. There's plenty of dead time in 'Duckling' where nothing much happens beyond CK simply hanging out and getting accustomed to some very strange surroundings. But dead time is not wasted time. Thank God, 'Duckling' is content to ramble rather than rush, to meander and mosey rather than getting right to the heart of the matter."

Alan Sepinwall of HitFix wrote, "Fantastic episode. It's been twelve hours since I watched it, and I’m still smiling just thinking about it." Joshua Kurp of Vulture wrote, "'Duckling' was barely about Louie, and when it was, it was about him looking after a baby duck, trying to get laid, shitting on Buffalo, New York, and the one moment of tension was offset by a fat man falling down while chasing a baby animal. Rather, 'Duckling' was a weirdly patriotic episode about a bunch of guys and girls just doing their jobs the best they can, otherwise known as the American Way."

=== Accolades ===
For the episode, Louis C.K. was nominated for Outstanding Lead Actor in a Comedy Series and Outstanding Directing for a Comedy Series at the 64th Primetime Emmy Awards. He lost the former to Jon Cryer for Two and a Half Men, and the latter to Modern Family for the episode "Baby on Board".
