= Double Date/Mom =

- Louie episode
- Episode no.: Season 1 Episode 7
- Directed by: Louis C.K.
- Written by: Louis C.K.
- Cinematography by: Paul Koestner
- Editing by: Louis C.K.
- Production code: XCK01008
- Original release date: August 3, 2010
- Running time: 22 minutes

Guest appearances
- Robert Kelly as Robbie; Mary Louise Wilson as Louie's mother; David Patrick Kelly as Therapist

Episode chronology
← Previous "Heckler/Cop Movie"	Next → "Dogpound"
- Louie (season 1)

"Double Date/Mom" is the seventh episode of the first season of the American comedy-drama television series Louie. The episode was written and directed by Louis C.K., who also serves as the lead actor. It was released on FX on August 3, 2010.

The series follows Louie, a fictionalized version of C.K., a comedian and newly divorced father raising his two daughters in New York City. In the episode, Louie's brother proposes that he joins him and his girlfriend for a three-way, while Louie also faces a confession from his mother.

According to Nielsen Media Research, the episode was seen by an estimated 0.581 million household viewers and gained a 0.3 ratings share among adults aged 18–49. The episode received very positive reviews from critics, who praised the humor, performances and themes.

== Plot ==
While at a gym, Louie (Louis C.K.) meets his brother Robbie (Robert Kelly). Robbie has a problem he thinks Louie can help him with: Robbie's gorgeous girlfriend will kiss him but won't take things further romantically. Because she is a huge fan of Louie's comedy and knows he's Robbie's sibling, Robbie's idea is that Louie will pretend to join them for a threesome and get her worked up enough to then have sex with Robbie while Louie leaves the room. Louie tells Robbie he won't do that and also for Robbie to take a very, very long time before trying to contact him again about anything.

Louie is visited by his mother (Mary Louise Wilson). Taking her to a restaurant, she tells him that she is lesbian, surprising Louie. Louie shows indifference, telling her that she and his children don't love her because she's selfish and stupid. This makes her cry in front of all the other patrons in the restaurant. He informs Robbie about her confession, and he gets them to another dinner. Their mother joins them with her girlfriend, Jasmine (Ana Kayne), who is even younger than both Louie and Robbie. Robbie confronts his mother, feeling she does not love him. When she refuses to say she loves him, their mother leaves, leaving Jasmine with Louie and Robbie.

== Production ==
=== Development ===
The episode was written and directed by series creator and lead actor Louis C.K., marking his seventh writing and directing credit for the series.

== Reception ==
=== Viewers ===
In its original American broadcast, "Double Date/Mom" was seen by an estimated 0.581 million household viewers with a 0.3 in the 18-49 demographics. This means that 0.3 percent of all households with televisions watched the episode. This was a 30% decrease in viewership from the previous episode, which was watched by 0.820 million viewers with a 0.4 in the 18-49 demographics.

=== Critical reviews ===
"Double Date/Mom" received very positive reviews from critics. Nathan Rabin of The A.V. Club gave the episode an "A–" grade and wrote, "Tonight's episode began with two uncomfortable truths about family life, then pushed them to comic extremes, all while maintaining a perfect deadpan and undercurrent of deep melancholy. The first short film acknowledged that we like to think of our family members as perfectly asexual, despite all the evidence to the contrary."

Emily St. James of Los Angeles Times wrote, "There's something in the show's DNA that lets it switch very adeptly between funny moments and more heartfelt or uncomfortable ones. C.K. and his actors are never afraid to push for something a little bit more risky than most comedies, and it's that sense of daring that has elevated the show beyond most other comedies on the air. 'Double Date/Mom' is maybe the most consistent episode of the show yet, and it proves that Louie can be funny and fascinating no matter what sort of emotional territory it covers." Ian McDonald of TV Overmind wrote, "While not as funny as previous episodes, 'Double Date/Mom' continues the show's domination of television comedy."
