= Moving (Louie) =

- Louie episode
- Episode no.: Season 2 Episode 3
- Directed by: Louis C.K.
- Written by: Louis C.K.
- Cinematography by: Paul Koestner
- Editing by: Louis C.K.
- Production code: XCK02001
- Original release date: July 7, 2011
- Running time: 22 minutes

Guest appearances
- Pamela Adlon as Pamela; Peter Benson as Ken; Donna Hanover as Gloria

Episode chronology
← Previous "Bummer/Blueberries"	Next → "Joan"
- Louie (season 2)

"Moving" is the third episode of the second season of the American comedy-drama television series Louie. It is the 16th overall episode of the series and was written and directed by Louis C.K., who also serves as the lead actor. It was released on FX on July 7, 2011.

The series follows Louie, a fictionalized version of C.K., a comedian and newly divorced father raising his two daughters in New York City. In the episode, Louie decides to move out of his house and looks for a new apartment, finding obstacles on the way.

According to Nielsen Media Research, the episode was seen by an estimated 0.95 million household viewers and gained a 0.5 ratings share among adults aged 18–49. The episode received critical acclaim, with critics praising the episode's absurdist humor, character development and ending.

== Plot ==
While tending furniture at his apartment, Louie (Louis C.K.) is asked by his daughters about his status now that their mother does not live with them anymore. This prompts Louie to decide to find a new house, asking Pamela (Pamela Adlon) for help. However, most of the apartments prove to be poor in design, with some lacking enough space for everything and occupied by an angry man who is owning rent.

Louie eventually finds a luxury house, which was once rented to Lenny Bruce. Despite the massive $17 million asking price, Louie accepts the offer. Louie's accountant does not think it is a good idea as Louie still needs paying child support, but Louie is confident that the girls will love living there. However, due to the price tag as well as the tax payments and utilities, Louie sees he will not be able to achieve it. In the end, he decides to just repaint his apartment, with the help of his girls.

== Production ==
=== Development ===
The episode was written and directed by series creator and lead actor Louis C.K., marking his sixteenth writing and directing credit for the series.

=== Writing ===
On the basis of the episode, C.K. said, "I thought about what kind of desires I was gonna have at this point. I remember when I got divorced, I stayed in the home I was living in, and I remember what a huge transformative step it was to go get my own place." He also said, "It's depressing that you can never get out of where you're stuck financially and real-estate-wise. And I think I'm probably not the only one who has tried to put on a credible face and go see a place that's out of my range. And all of a sudden, you're treated with all this respect. And it's like a true home with real scale. So that was that scene."

== Reception ==
=== Viewers ===
In its original American broadcast, "Moving" was seen by an estimated 0.95 million household viewers with a 0.5 in the 18-49 demographics. This means that 0.5 percent of all households with televisions watched the episode. This was a 26% decrease in viewership from the previous episode, which was watched by 1.28 million viewers with a 0.7 in the 18-49 demographics.

=== Critical reviews ===
"Moving" received critical acclaim. Nathan Rabin of The A.V. Club gave the episode an "A–" grade and wrote, "In the end, Louie ends up doing what people generally do when their goals are forever outside their grasp: he slaps a new coat of paint on something less than perfect and continues to dream of something better. It's an expectedly moving ending to a show that's leaping from peak to peak these days."

Alan Sepinwall of HitFix wrote, "Of the season 2 episodes I've seen so far, I think 'Moving' was my favorite, because it manages to squeeze so many of the things I love about Louie into a single story." Joshua Kurp of Vulture wrote, "'Moving' ends with Louie sitting on the stoop of the house he'll never be able to afford, staring at the door, a heartbreaking and relatable scene. Finally convinced that he's not going anywhere soon, Louis makes the best of a hopeless situation, takes Pamela's advice, and does something: he paints his apartment a new color with the help of his daughters. It's all in the details."
