= Bully (Louie) =

- Louie episode
- Episode no.: Season 1 Episode 9
- Directed by: Louis C.K.
- Written by: Louis C.K.
- Cinematography by: Paul Koestner
- Editing by: Doug Abel; Louis C.K.
- Production code: XCK01005
- Original release date: August 17, 2010
- Running time: 23 minutes

Guest appearances
- Michael Drayer as Sean; Danny Burstein as Mike; Amy Landecker as Sandra; Max Behren as Young Louie

Episode chronology
← Previous "Dogpound"	Next → "Dentist/Tarese"
- Louie (season 1)

"Bully" is the ninth episode of the first season of the American comedy-drama television series Louie. The episode was written and directed by Louis C.K., who also serves as the lead actor. It was released on FX on August 17, 2010.

The series follows Louie, a fictionalized version of C.K., a comedian and newly divorced father raising his two daughters in New York City. In the episode, Louie is humiliated by a bully during a date, so he decides to confront him at his house.

According to Nielsen Media Research, the episode was seen by an estimated 0.580 million household viewers and gained a 0.3 ratings share among adults aged 18–49. The episode received very positive reviews from critics, For his performance in the episode, Louis C.K. was nominated for Outstanding Lead Actor in a Comedy Series at the 63rd Primetime Emmy Awards.

== Plot ==
In flashbacks, a young Louie (Max Behren) is informed of sex by his father. His father gives him the idea that he must tease women by wanting sex, also deeming it only as "making love". In his stand-up set, Louis (Louis C.K.) jokes about all the learnings he received from his father.

While on a date with woman named Sandra (Amy Landecker), Louie is annoyed by a group of high school students who speak too loudly. Louie asks them to lower their voice. One of the group, Sean (Michael Drayer), joins Louie and Sandra, mocking Louie and suggesting that he could beat him up. He humiliates Louie by making him say not to beat him up. Sandra decides to leave Louie, deeming him a loser. Later, Louie runs into Sean and decides to follow him, including boarding the Staten Island Ferry. Reaching Sean's house, Louie decides to visit, talking with Sean's parents. Sean's father, Mike (Danny Burstein), hits Sean and tries to force him to apologize. When Louie objects to their treatment of Sean, the parents kick him out of the house.

Joining Louie outside, Mike laments his situation, given that he has to raise three kids and his father also used to hit him. They bond over their lives and jobs, while they decide to smoke. Part of the experience serves as part of Louie's stand-up routine. The episode ends with Louie joining his young self, warning him that he will go bald.

== Production ==
=== Development ===
The episode was written and directed by series creator and lead actor Louis C.K., marking his ninth writing and directing credit for the series.

== Reception ==
=== Viewers ===
In its original American broadcast, "Bully" was seen by an estimated 0.580 million household viewers with a 0.3 in the 18-49 demographics. This means that 0.3 percent of all households with televisions watched the episode. This was a 26% decrease in viewership from the previous episode, which was watched by 0.777 million viewers with a 0.4 in the 18-49 demographics.

=== Critical reviews ===
"Bully" received critical acclaim. Nathan Rabin of The A.V. Club gave the episode an "A–" grade and wrote, "Tonight's excruciatingly awesome episode of Louie was all about sex and violence, though the connection between the two was sometimes tenuous, even during a callback during C.K's last stand-up comedy bit about how at the age of forty two he's officially reached the point where he'll never suck a dick, beat somebody up or ski."

Alan Sepinwall of HitFix wrote, "The episode was bookended, as usual, by funny stand-up but in between was a long, dark, intentionally non-comic story about the power that teenage bullies can still have on grown-ass men, and then on the lessons that parents pass on to their children. It was deliberately uncomfortable at times, but still managed to find some brief light moments, like Louie's indignant dismissal of his date after she admits she was turned off by his response to the bully, or the laugh Louie and the bully's dad share about Louie's profession."

Emily St. James of Los Angeles Times wrote, "It's a lovely little piece that touches on any number of themes and ideas without preaching about any of them. It's one of the best television episodes of the young season." Ian McDonald of TV Overmind wrote, "Once again, Louie is light on laughs. However, I can't stress enough that this is a good thing. The subject matter and jokes presented throughout the series would fail miserably if they were presented in a slap-sticky, 'sitcom' manner."

=== Accolades ===
Louis C.K. submitted this episode to support his nomination for Outstanding Lead Actor in a Comedy Series at the 63rd Primetime Emmy Awards. He lost the award to Jim Parsons for The Big Bang Theory.
