= Country Drive =

- Louie episode
- Episode no.: Season 2 Episode 5
- Directed by: Louis C.K.
- Written by: Louis C.K.
- Cinematography by: Paul Koestner
- Editing by: Louis C.K.
- Production code: XCK02007
- Original release date: July 21, 2011
- Running time: 22 minutes

Guest appearance
- Eunice Anderson as Aunt Ellen

Episode chronology
← Previous "Joan"	Next → "Subway/Pamela"
- Louie (season 2)

"Country Drive" is the fifth episode of the second season of the American comedy-drama television series Louie. It is the 18th overall episode of the series and was written and directed by Louis C.K., who also serves as the lead actor. It was released on FX on July 21, 2011.

The series follows Louie, a fictionalized version of C.K., a comedian and newly divorced father raising his two daughters in New York City. In the episode, Louie takes his daughters to meet their great-aunt, whose racist background prove to be a challenge for them.

According to Nielsen Media Research, the episode was seen by an estimated 0.87 million household viewers and gained a 0.4 ratings share among adults aged 18–49. The episode received critical acclaim, with critics praising the humor, themes and performances.

== Plot ==
Louie (Louis C.K.) takes his daughters on a car trip to meet his great-aunt Ellen (Eunice Anderson) out in rural Pennsylvania. Both Lilly (Hadley Delany) and Jane (Ursula Parker) express boredom throughout the trip, but Louie just decides to ignore them, preferring to sing "Who Are You" from the radio. As he sings the lyrics, he uses some of the profanities used in front of his daughters.

They eventually reach Ellen's house, where they find that Ellen uses racial slurs, even using it to refer to a Brazil nut. After having listened her for the whole evening, Louie decides to finally allow his daughters to fully understand the context of the slurs, only to discover that Ellen has fallen in the kitchen, dying. Part of the experience is used by Louie at a stand-up set, where he deems Tom Sawyer as a good person and Huckleberry Finn as a racist.

== Production ==
=== Development ===
The episode was written and directed by series creator and lead actor Louis C.K., marking his eighteenth writing and directing credit for the series.

=== Writing ===
Ellen's storyline was inspired by an old lady whom C.K. overheard using racial slurs. He said, "so I wrote this thing, and then the drive there was the same thing as making dinner for the kids when the sister shows up."

=== Music ===
The licensed use of "Who Are You" by The Who would originally cost $300,000, which would consume the entire budget of the episode. C.K. asked permission from the band's guitarist Pete Townshend, who agreed to let them use it for $15,000.

== Reception ==
=== Viewers ===
In its original American broadcast, "Country Drive" was seen by an estimated 0.87 million household viewers with a 0.4 in the 18-49 demographics. This means that 0.4 percent of all households with televisions watched the episode. This was a 23% decrease in viewership from the previous episode, which was watched by 1.12 million viewers with a 0.6 in the 18-49 demographics.

=== Critical reviews ===
"Country Drive" received critical acclaim. Nathan Rabin of The A.V. Club gave the episode an "A–" grade and wrote, "Like George Carlin or Chris Rock before him, he wants to take hurtful words apart (he's similarly a big fan of "cunt") and figure out why they get under our skin and trouble us so. He’s a casual deconstructionist and “Country Drive” is casually brilliant in its analysis of how language, intent and meaning change and evolve over time."

Alan Sepinwall of HitFix wrote, "Louie struggling to teach his daughters adult values is one of the more reliable sources of both humor and pathos on the show, so 'Country Drive' worked very effectively. You knew the visit to see the great aunt wasn't going to turn out like Louie intended it to, but you didn't know exactly how. But an old lady who turns out to be racist and dies in mid-visit seems about par for the course for our man, unfortunately."

James Poniewozik of TIME wrote, "The two halves of the episode — Louie driving with his bored kids, Louie encounter his great-aunt's racism — really connect as one theme. As a parent, you want to expose your children to all the wonders of the world; but exposing them to the world's wonders necessarily means teaching them about all the world's unpleasantness too." Joshua Kurp of Vulture wrote, "Louie knows this, and instead of bullshitting to his daughters in the same way that parents won't explain where babies come from, he lets them be curious and ask questions, in order to lessen the word's loaded meaning. That's the sign of a good parent — and a great way to end another great episode of Louie."
