= Poker/Divorce =

- Louie episode
- Episode no.: Season 1 Episode 2
- Directed by: Louis C.K.
- Written by: Louis C.K.
- Cinematography by: Paul Koestner
- Editing by: Doug Abel
- Production code: XCK01004
- Original air date: June 29, 2010
- Running time: 23 minutes

Guest appearances
- Rick Crom as Rick; Nick DiPaolo as Nick; Kimberly Barlow as Tammy; Max Behren as Young Louie; Robert Kelly as Bobby

Episode chronology
| ← Previous "Pilot" | Next → "Dr. Ben/Nick" |
- Louie season 1

"Poker/Divorce" is the second episode of the American comedy-drama television series Louie. It first aired on the FX channel in the United States on June 29, 2010, and was written and directed by the show's creator and star, Louis C.K.

== Plot ==
Louie and comedians Nick DiPaolo, Hannibal Buress, Jim Norton, Eddie Brill, and Rick Crom exchange jokes whilst playing a game of poker. Norton tells Brill to stick his seven-card up his mother's anus, but DiPaolo says her anus would be too crammed with penises. Brill says it makes no sense. However, Louie disagrees, saying that she uses a coffee tamper to get them in there. DiPaolo asks Crom, who is a homosexual, what sex is like for him. The conversation leads to Crom telling them about a club called City Jerks, where several homosexual men perform masturbation on each other, which the comedians question him about. Crom tells them he doesn't care what they do in their sexual life and that they are obsessed with his. Louie asks whether he should use the word "faggot" onstage, Crom says he doesn't care if it is said onstage and tells them that the origin of the word comes from the Middle Ages, when homosexuals where thrown into the kindling and burned alive, thus originating the phrase "flaming faggot" (although this is disputed). Crom tells them that by using the word, he is reminded of times when he was abused for being homosexual. DiPaolo jokingly calls him a "faggot" and the men laugh together.

In his stand-up set, Louie says he was married from the age of 28 until 42. He says that getting divorced is like leaving a bad time machine that takes 14 years to go forward 14 years. Louie and his wife sign the divorce forms. He tells his brother over dinner he views it positively, because he's now single and gets to find a new partner, but his brother just finds it "weird" and says he is likely to die alone. Back performing stand-up, Louie says his life is on an exponential decline. In his apartment, he looks at his body in the mirror and extends his middle finger to himself. He looks at old school yearbook photos and finds a girl named he knew named Tammy. In a flashback sequence, a young Louie stares at Tammy. She asks him if he wants her deceased father's watch. Later she offers him alcohol, which he declines, then tells him to "whip it out". In the present day, Louie realizes he still has the watch and sends her a message on Facebook. He visits her at her home, and she looks noticeably different to what she used to. He tells her about their brief moment together, which she doesn't remember, before they have sex passionately on the floor.

Louie says in his stand-up set that the only reasoning he has for not having sex with animals is because he's told not to. He then says it would possibly be rape, but if the animal is aroused, then it is morally acceptable. He claims he would wait only two minutes before having sex with a monkey if he was the last person on the planet.

== Reception ==
=== Ratings ===
The episode aired immediately after the pilot episode on June 29, 2010 and was watched by 1.11 million people in the United States.

=== Critical reception ===
The episode received positive reviews. The A.V. Club's Nathan Rabin gave the episode a positive "A" score, saying the opening sequence "moves from quiet moments of human connection to bawdy irreverence seamlessly and effortlessly".

It was nominated for the Primetime Emmy Award for Outstanding Writing for a Comedy Series.
