= Niece (Louie) =

- Louie episode
- Episode no.: Season 2 Episode 12
- Directed by: Louis C.K.
- Written by: Louis C.K.
- Cinematography by: Paul Koestner
- Editing by: Louis C.K.
- Production code: XCK02011
- Original release date: September 1, 2011
- Running time: 22 minutes

Guest appearances
- Gideon Adlon as Amy; Lisa Emery as Karleen

Episode chronology
← Previous "Duckling"	Next → "New Jersey/Airport"
- Louie (season 2)

"Niece" is the twelfth episode of the second season of the American comedy-drama television series Louie. It is the 25th overall episode of the series and was written and directed by Louis C.K., who also serves as the lead actor. It was released on FX on September 1, 2011.

The series follows Louie, a fictionalized version of C.K., a comedian and newly divorced father raising his two daughters in New York City. In the episode, Louie is forced to take care of his niece after his sister suddenly dumps her.

According to Nielsen Media Research, the episode was seen by an estimated 0.98 million household viewers and gained a 0.6 ratings share among adults aged 18–49. The episode received critical acclaim, with critics praising the performances, character development and themes.

== Plot ==
At Grand Central Station, Louie is awaiting his sister Karleen (Lisa Emery) and niece Amy (Gideon Adlon). Karleen arrives in a panicked state, telling her that she must leave for Philadelphia without her daughter and providing no details as she runs off to Louie's complete shock. Amy is ambivalent to her mother's actions and shows little emotion, while constantly ignoring Louie's questions.

Hoping to form a good relationship with her, Louie takes her to an indie rock club at her request, but the concert leaves her stone-faced and Louie even more frustrated. After the show, she tells him she wants to see him perform a stand-up set. He takes her to the Comedy Cellar, where she is impressed by Godfrey's performance as a warm-up comic for the audience. Louie tries to win her over by doing his own warm up act (which is very different than his usual headlining act) but fails at doing so. Godfrey talks with Amy, and Louie is surprised that she is bonding with him; Godfrey then smarms at Louie that his girlfriend has a young child and that Louie needs to learn empathy. On the way back to the apartment, Louie gives a homeless man $1 and Amy tells him he's being condescending and superior. Louie finally loses his patience with her and says that her parents' idiotic beliefs would have people who need help (a community of help Louie considers himself part of) just dying. When Amy cites her father's claim that people who give charity only do so to make themselves feel better, Louie devastates her by snarling "Yeah, and then he ran out on you." Amy asks to go home, but takes Louie's hand as they walk, and he is carrying her when they arrive as she's fallen asleep. Once they arrive, Louie put Amy in Jane's bed to sleep and is then called by a Philadelphia hospital. They tell Louie that Karleen was found ranting and being irrational in a public fountain and was committed for observation. The hospital worker asks Louie if she has a father or any other immediately family, but Louie simply says of Amy's dad "he's a bad guy, he's gone" and accepts the responsibility for taking care of her.

== Production ==
=== Development ===
The episode was written and directed by series creator and lead actor Louis C.K., marking his 25th writing and directing credit for the series.

=== Writing ===
C.K. explained the concept, "I had this idea of taking on a kid that's not my kid's age. When you're a parent, you're an expert on the day you're parenting. I'm an expert at a six and a nine-year-old, and beyond that, I don't know what the fuck I'm doing. Luckily, you take it one day at a time. But the idea of being projected forward to a 13-year-old was very scary to me." The character of Amy was played by Gideon Adlon, daughter of recurring cast member Pamela Adlon.

== Reception ==
=== Viewers ===
In its original American broadcast, "Niece" was seen by an estimated 0.98 million household viewers with a 0.6 in the 18-49 demographics. This means that 0.6 percent of all households with televisions watched the episode. This was a 20% increase in viewership from the previous episode, which was watched by 0.81 million viewers with a 0.5 in the 18-49 demographics.

=== Critical reviews ===
"Niece" received critical acclaim. Nathan Rabin of The A.V. Club gave the episode an "A–" grade and wrote, "'Niece' ends on an unexpectedly melodramatic note, with Louie receiving a phone call that his sister is in the hospital in Philadelphia. It's a bit of a cliffhanger for a show that typically eschews such conventions. Could this ending mark a new direction for the show as it closes out season two and prepares for season three?"

Alan Sepinwall of HitFix wrote, "'Niece' didn't have the power of last week's trip to Afghanistan, or 'Eddie' or a number of other episodes, but it did play nicely off of what little we heard of Louie's other sister when she called him in the Joan Rivers episode." Joshua Kurp of Vulture wrote, "'Niece' could have very easily been an episode of Curb Your Enthusiasm. Louie unfairly depicts himself as an asshole unable to communicate with those different from him, a.k.a. anyone who's not a comedian, not unlike what Larry David has been doing for so many years. [...] Plot resolutions don't matter on Louie, just as they don't really matter Curb, either; it's the set-up that counts, and 'Niece' had a good one."
