= Dogpound (Louie) =

- Louie episode
- Episode no.: Season 1 Episode 8
- Directed by: Louis C.K.
- Written by: Louis C.K.
- Cinematography by: Paul Koestner
- Editing by: Doug Abel; Louis C.K.
- Production code: XCK01009
- Original release date: August 10, 2010
- Running time: 22 minutes

Guest appearances
- Pamela Adlon as Pamela; Robert Kelly as Robbie; Josh Hamilton as Jeff; Tracee Chimo as Dog Pound Volunteer

Episode chronology
← Previous "Double Date/Mom"	Next → "Bully"
- Louie (season 1)

"Dogpound" is the eighth episode of the first season of the American comedy-drama television series Louie. The episode was written and directed by Louis C.K., who also serves as the lead actor. It was released on FX on August 10, 2010.

The series follows Louie, a fictionalized version of C.K., a comedian and newly divorced father raising his two daughters in New York City. In the episode, Louie's children leave for a week, and Louie tries to find ways to cope with their absence.

According to Nielsen Media Research, the episode was seen by an estimated 0.777 million household viewers and gained a 0.4 ratings share among adults aged 18–49. The episode received very positive reviews from critics, who praised the deviation of its formula, humor and character development.

== Plot ==
After leaving his children with their mother for a week, Louie (Louis C.K.) is called by Pamela (Pamela Adlon). Louie states he feels depressed without the girls' presence, so Pamela tells him to "get energized." He goes to a convenience store to buy a water bottle, but ends up buying ice cream and pizza, which he binge eats throughout two days.

After failing in exercising, Louie talks with his neighbor Jeff (Josh Hamilton), who frequently smokes marijuana. Pressured by Jeff, Louie joins him in smoking marijuana. However, Louie smokes far too much and starts hallucinating. The next day, he recovers from his hangover, although he now hears people speaking gibberish. While leaving a coffee shop, he finds a Husky chained to a fence and decides to adopt a dog. At the shelter, he picks up an adult dog. When he takes him to his apartment, the dog shortly dies and is taken by animal control.

Right after animal control leaves, his children arrive at his apartment. Louie takes them back inside, telling he had a good weekend.

== Production ==
=== Development ===
The episode was written and directed by series creator and lead actor Louis C.K., marking his eighth writing and directing credit for the series.

== Reception ==
=== Viewers ===
In its original American broadcast, "Double Date/Mom" was seen by an estimated 0.777 million household viewers with a 0.4 in the 18-49 demographics. This means that 0.4 percent of all households with televisions watched the episode. This was a 33% increase in viewership from the previous episode, which was watched by 0.581 million viewers with a 0.3 in the 18-49 demographics.

=== Critical reviews ===
"Dogpound" received extremely positive reviews from critics. Nathan Rabin of The A.V. Club gave the episode an "A–" grade and wrote, "Tonight's episode broke many of the show’s quasi-conventions. In lieu of two short films, sometimes connected, sometimes not, it offered one overarching narrative, tonight's episode offered one narrative that ran through the entire episode. In lieu of a constantly changing cast it brought back a pair of semi-regulars only to discard them in the early going. It fucked around with audience expectations and delivered a never-ending string of inspired non-sequiturs. It felt throughout like a weird dream, the kind you're semi-sorry you have to wake from."

Alan Sepinwall of HitFix wrote, "Every episode of Louie is told from Louis C.K.'s distinct, self-loathing point of view, but 'Dogpound' did an especially good job of putting you inside Louie's head, whether it was the paranoia that came from smoking weed for the first time in a long time, or the rest of humanity seeming very much like a gibberish-spouting zombie apocalypse the morning after."

Emily St. James of Los Angeles Times wrote, "'Dogpound' pulled off the difficult trick of being both funny and kind of miserable, without making the audience want to kill itself. It just might have been the most consistent episode of Louie yet." Ian McDonald of TV Overmind wrote, "Like the preceding episode, this week's episode was light on out loud laughs. Again, that's not to say it was any less funny than any other episode. Think of tonight's episode as one single joke with a great lead-in and one hell of a punchline."
