= Come On, God =

- Louie episode
- Episode no.: Season 2 Episode 8
- Directed by: Louis C.K.
- Written by: Louis C.K.
- Cinematography by: Paul Koestner
- Editing by: Louis C.K.
- Production code: XCK02003
- Original release date: August 11, 2011
- Running time: 21 minutes

Guest appearances
- Greg Gutfeld as himself; Liz Holtan as Ellen Farber; Angela Gould as Elevator woman

Episode chronology
← Previous "Oh, Louie/Tickets"	Next → "Eddie"
- Louie (season 2)

"Come On, God" is the eighth episode of the second season of the American comedy-drama television series Louie. It is the 21st overall episode of the series and was written and directed by Louis C.K., who also serves as the lead actor. It was released on FX on August 11, 2011, airing back-to-back with the follow-up episode "Eddie".

The series follows Louie, a fictionalized version of C.K., a comedian and newly divorced father raising his two daughters in New York City. In the episode, Louie has a debate with a Christian woman on Fox News regarding the morality of masturbation.

According to Nielsen Media Research, the episode was seen by an estimated 0.73 million household viewers and gained a 0.4 ratings share among adults aged 18–49. The episode was praised by critics, who praised the humor, debate scene, themes and character development, with many naming it among the series's best episodes.

== Plot ==
Red Eye w/ Greg Gutfeld, a talk show on Fox News, is holding a debate between two parties. The first is Ellen Farber (Liz Holtan), a spokeswoman for Christians Against Masturbation (CAM), while the second turns out to be Louie (Louis C.K.). The subject of the debate is about the morality of masturbation, with Louie defending the option, although he is taken aback when she asks if he feels happy. After the show, Ellen invites Louie to attend a CAM meeting.

When he returns home, he masturbates after thinking of a woman he met while taking the elevator. Later, he decides to attend a CAM meeting, and goes out with Ellen for drinks. She invites him to her suite, where Louie tries to kiss her, although Ellen states it wouldn't work. Ellen gives a speech where she suggests maybe they could talk, which could lead to them dating and then eventually seeing her in her underwear. Later at home, Louie tries to masturbate to a picture, but loses concentration when the radio mentions a genocide at Somalia.

== Production ==
=== Development ===
The episode was written and directed by series creator and lead actor Louis C.K., marking his 21st writing and directing credit for the series.

=== Writing ===
The concept of the episode originally involved Louie getting in trouble for saying comments in a cable show. C.K. decided to change the concept, explaining "it's so much more interesting to write a real version about them and find out what I could learn about that mentality, instead of just making fun of it. And also, my life as a masturbator is a miserable life." He further added, "There is something we can learn from each other: pulling back, making it mean something, and really aiming for ecstasy instead of just jacking off. That's where that came from."

== Reception ==
=== Viewers ===
In its original American broadcast, "Come On, God" was seen by an estimated 0.73 million household viewers with a 0.4 in the 18-49 demographics. This means that 0.4 percent of all households with televisions watched the episode. This was a 22% decrease in viewership from the previous episode, which was watched by 0.93 million viewers with a 0.4 in the 18-49 demographics.

=== Critical reviews ===
"Come On, God" received universal acclaim. Nathan Rabin of The A.V. Club gave the episode an "A" grade and wrote, "Louie views sex and masturbation as a matter of course. These are just things people do, and in the case of the latter, it's something people do often. To Ellen, they're something sacred, something to be saved for the special person and the time being right. The episode doesn't demonize her point of view; it just finds it almost incredibly alien."

Alan Sepinwall of HitFix wrote, "What seemed like it was going to be a set-up for C.K. to attack the hypocrisy of religious fundamentalism – the direction virtually any other TV show would go with this material – instead did something very unexpected: it took the other side's viewpoint very, very seriously. The woman, while unswerving in her beliefs, never judged Louie, and seemed to enjoy his company, and when she explained her vision of what she thinks sex will be like with God’s approval, it sounded vastly better than what we know of Louie's desperate, sweaty, uncomfortable love life."

James Poniewozik of TIME wrote, "It's one of the most mature discussions of these two attitudes toward sexuality I've seen on TV, and yes, I am saying that about an episode that concludes with a man masturbating and farting on a toilet." Joshua Kurp of Vulture wrote, "One of the best things about the episode was it didn't paint Louie's side as right and Ellen's as wrong, or vice versa; I've written before about Louie's resistance to black-and-white thinking, and 'Come On, God' could have gone for the easy Christian jokes, but it never demonized Ellen, nor her beliefs."
