= Eddie (Louie) =

- Louie episode
- Episode no.: Season 2 Episode 9
- Directed by: Louis C.K.
- Written by: Louis C.K.
- Cinematography by: Paul Kostener
- Editing by: Louis C.K.
- Production code: XCK02010
- Original air date: August 11, 2011

Guest appearance
- Doug Stanhope as Eddie

Episode chronology
← Previous "Come On, God"	Next → "Halloween/Ellie"

"Eddie" is the ninth episode of the second season of Louie. It first aired on the FX channel in the United States on August 11, 2011. The episode has him reconnecting with an estranged friend from the comedy club circuit who confesses that he is planning on killing himself and just wants to say goodbye to the only person who will associate with him. The episode was received positively by critics.

== Plot ==
After finishing a stand-up set, Louie runs into his old friend and colleague Eddie Mack (Doug Stanhope), whom he hasn't seen since Louie began his rise to comedy stardom and an angry Eddie (who was rejected for the same path) called Louie a sell-out. Louie is happy to see his friend, but when Eddie becomes unnecessarily aggressive towards a fellow comedian and throws racist insults at a liquor store clerk, it becomes clear that something is wrong with him. It turns out Eddie is struggling with his career, lives in his car and drinks heavily. The two go out together, get drunk, and Eddie does an impromptu set at an open mic event where his routine is both disgusting and very funny (he's the only participant who gets any laughs from the crowd). As the evening comes to an end, Eddie tells Louie that he's planning to end it. Louie thinks he is talking about his stand-up career, but Eddie is actually planning to commit suicide, and sought out Louie because he wanted someone to say goodbye to. His plan is to take sleep-aid medicine that a sympathetic doctor gave him, knowing that mixing the pills with alcohol will kill him. Louie initially states that he has struggled with determining his purpose in life and had to discover it for himself and everyone must discover their own purpose. When Eddie mocks Louie for seeing himself as some kind of brave savior, Louie finally gets angry and tells off Eddie for being selfish and demanding Louie cater to him, yelling "You know what, it's not your life. It's life. Life is bigger than you. If you can imagine that. Life isn't something that you possess, it's something that you take part in, and you witness." However, when Eddie asks Louie to give him one good reason to live, Louie goes quiet. They are both promptly interrupted by a random couple arguing within earshot. The moment ends with the two chuckling about how they were arguing just like the couple that passed by. Louie gives Eddie a hug and says sincerely that he hopes Eddie won't harm himself, but they part ways with the issue unresolved, and it is not revealed what eventually happens to Eddie.

== Reception ==
James Poniewozik of Time's "Tuned In" blog gave the episode a positive review. He commented on how the show had "evolved from a surreal comedy about one comic's take on life, to a funny show about the serious subject of how to live." Emily VanDerWerff of The A.V. Club gave the episode a grade "A". She believed the show was better in its second season than in its first, asking "is there a show on right now better than Louie?"
