= Joan (Louie) =

- Louie episode
- Episode no.: Season 2 Episode 4
- Directed by: Louis C.K.
- Written by: Louis C.K.
- Cinematography by: Paul Kosenter
- Editing by: Louis C.K.
- Production code: XCK02002
- Original air date: July 14, 2011

Guest appearance
- Joan Rivers as herself

Episode chronology
← Previous "Moving"	Next → "Country Drive"

"Joan" is the fourth episode of the second season of Louie. It first aired on the FX channel in the United States on July 14, 2011, and was written, directed and edited by the show's creator and star, Louis C.K. The episode features Joan Rivers in one of her final television appearances, just a few years before her death in 2014.

== Plot ==
The episode starts with a quick vignette of Louie trying to order delivery from a deli but the person at the deli keeps mishearing what he says. Louie wants to order 6 bananas, but the deli keeps hearing it as 60. After Louie's sister calls him frantic and crying, a delivery person from the deli arrives at Louie's door with the 60 bananas.

The rest of the episode takes place in Las Vegas, where Louie is performing as the lounge comedian in a Trump casino and doing very poorly. After bombing on stage for several minutes, Louie starts to make disparaging jokes about the casino, Donald Trump, and the lounge audience. Louie gets in trouble with the casino for swearing and making those jokes. Louie is offered a chance to keep working if he can just agree to the terms for the next show, but he instead decides to quit.

Louie walks around the casino and ends up watching Joan Rivers do her act in the casino theater. Joan is doing very well with the audience, including Louie. After the show, Louie approaches her to say hi, and she invites him to come back to her room to hang out. Back in the room, Louie explains to Joan why he quit the lounge. Joan refuses to accept his decision, telling Louie that he cannot disparage the host or make fun of Donald Trump in his own casino. She tells him that you can never quit and that you just have to appreciate that you have a job in the first place, because things change, and in a year, even she might be out of the theater and back in the lounge. Louie agrees with Joan but claims that he is sick of all of the bullshit. Joan refuses to accept this as well, exclaiming that she is a woman, and asking Louie to guess how many blowjobs he thinks she had to give to get where she is. After a long pause, Louie posits 40 as a guess. Joan angrily slaps him, shouting, "None! I don't do blowjobs!" She hammers in that Louie cannot quit because if he's doing stand-up comedy, it means it's his calling and that he loves it more than anything else. "We make people happy" she says.

After a long silence, Louie makes an unwanted move on Joan, kissing her and grabbing but she is disgusted. She hits him and tells him no, and Louie stops, explaining that he misread the situation. Joan forgives Louie, and then decides that it's fine, telling him to come with her to the bedroom, but not to tell anyone about this ever. Joan explains, "It's for your sake, not mine. Nobody likes necrophiliacs." The two go to Joan's bedroom and the credits come on screen.

As the credits roll, Louie goes back to the casino booker and apologizes. He asks for his job back and agrees to the terms, having taken Joan's advice.

== Reception ==
The episode received positive reviews. The A.V. Club's Nathan Rabin gave the episode a positive "A−" score, saying it was a "funny and deeply moving exploration of the existential dilemma of the stand-up comic and a valentine to the artform."

The episode was watched by 1.12 million U.S. viewers.

== Significance ==
"Joan" was one of Joan Rivers' final appearances on television before her death. After she died, Louis C.K. made the following statement:

"I feel very lucky that I knew Joan Rivers and I feel very sad that she's gone. She was a great comedian and a wonderful person. I never saw someone attack a stage with so much energy. She was a controlled lightning bolt. She was a prolific and unpredictable, joyful joke writer. She loved comedy. She loved the audience. She was a great actress and should have done that more. She loved living and working. She was kind. She was real. She was brave. She was funny and you just wanted to be around her. I looked up to her. I learned from her. I loved her. I liked her. And I already miss her very much. It really fucking sucks that she had to die all of a sudden."
