= List of Betty White's Off Their Rockers episodes =

Betty White's Off Their Rockers is an American comedy television series that began airing on January 16, 2012, on NBC. The series is hosted by Betty White, and is based on the Belgian television format Benidorm Bastards. As of 2014, the series moved to the cable network Lifetime.

During the course of the series, a total of 46 episodes of Betty White's Off Their Rockers aired over three seasons.

== Series overview ==
| Season | Episodes | Originally released | | |
| Season | Episodes | First released | Last released | Network |
|---|---|---|---|---|
| 1 | 12 | January 16, 2012 | May 23, 2012 | NBC |
| 2 | 14 | January 8, 2013 | July 9, 2013 | NBC |
| 3 | 20 | February 28, 2014 | September 12, 2017 | Lifetime |

== Episodes ==
=== Season 1 (2012) ===
| No. overall | No. in season | Title | Guest | Original release date | U.S. viewers (millions) |
|---|---|---|---|---|---|
| 1 | 1 | "Episode 1" | N/A | January 16, 2012 | 12.26 |
| 2 | 2 | "Episode 2" | N/A | April 4, 2012 | 7.40 |
| 3 | 3 | "Episode 3" | Ted Lange | April 11, 2012 | 6.06 |
| 4 | 4 | "Episode 4" | N/A | April 18, 2012 | 5.98 |
| 5 | 5 | "Episode 5" | N/A | April 25, 2012 | 5.83 |
| 6 | 6 | "Episode 6" | N/A | May 2, 2012 | 4.91 |
| 7 | 7 | "Episode 7" | Rob Schneider | May 2, 2012 | 4.90 |
| 8 | 8 | "Episode 8" | Adam West | May 9, 2012 | 5.20 |
| 9 | 9 | "Episode 9" | Wink Martindale | May 9, 2012 | 5.00 |
| 10 | 10 | "Episode 10" | N/A | May 16, 2012 | 5.18 |
| 11 | 11 | "Episode 11" | N/A | May 16, 2012 | 5.52 |
| 12 | 12 | "Episode 12" | Rob Schneider | May 23, 2012 | 5.39 |

=== Season 2 (2013) ===
| No. overall | No. in season | Title | Guest | Original release date | U.S. viewers (millions) |
|---|---|---|---|---|---|
| 13 | 1 | "Episode 201" | PSY | January 8, 2013 | 5.64 |
| 14 | 2 | "Episode 202" | Kim Kardashian | January 8, 2013 | 6.15 |
| 15 | 3 | "Episode 203" | Steve-O | January 15, 2013 | 5.41 |
| 16 | 4 | "Episode 204" | Nick Lachey | January 15, 2013 | 5.96 |
| 17 | 5 | "Episode 205" | Bob Harper | January 22, 2013 | 5.91 |
| 18 | 6 | "Episode 206" | Nicole Richie | January 22, 2013 | 5.91 |
| 19 | 7 | "Episode 207" | Nene Leakes | January 29, 2013 | 5.15 |
| 20 | 8 | "Episode 208" | Adrienne Maloof, Camille Grammer, & Kyle Richards | January 29, 2013 | 5.23 |
| 21 | 9 | "Episode 209" | Howie Mandel | February 19, 2013 | 4.64 |
| 22 | 10 | "Episode 210" | Nick Cannon | February 26, 2013 | 4.51 |
| 23 | 11 | "Episode 211" | N/A | March 19, 2013 | 3.66 |
| 24 | 12 | "Episode 212" | N/A | March 19, 2013 | 3.70 |
| 25 | 13 | "Episode 213" | N/A | June 25, 2013 | 4.04 |
| 26 | 14 | "Episode 214" | Ed Asner | July 9, 2013 | 3.96 |

=== Season 3 (2014–17) ===
On October 18, 2013, Lifetime revived the series for a twenty episode third season. Season 3 premiered on February 28, 2014. In 2014, amid the third season, the series took a three-year hiatus and resumed broadcast in September 2017.

| No. overall | No. in season | Title | Guest | Original release date | U.S. viewers (millions) |
|---|---|---|---|---|---|
| 27 | 1 | "Welcome Back — Taking Advantage" | N/A | February 28, 2014 | N/A |
| 28 | 2 | "Betty's New Chef" | N/A | February 28, 2014 | N/A |
| 29 | 3 | "Young, Hot, Single" | N/A | March 7, 2014 | N/A |
| 30 | 4 | "Feedback" | N/A | March 7, 2014 | 0.71 |
| 31 | 5 | "Back in the Day" | TBA | March 14, 2014 | TBA |
| 32 | 6 | "Betty's Second Career" | TBA | March 14, 2014 | TBA |
| 33 | 7 | "One Rule" | TBA | March 21, 2014 | TBA |
| 34 | 8 | "Work Out" | TBA | March 21, 2014 | TBA |
| 35 | 9 | "Betty Getting Married" | TBA | March 28, 2014 | TBA |
| 36 | 10 | "The First Thing to Go" | TBA | March 28, 2014 | TBA |
| 37 | 11 | "Giving Back" | TBA | May 23, 2014 | N/A |
| 38 | 12 | "Senior Danger" | TBA | May 23, 2014 | N/A |
| 39 | 13 | "Late Night Dates" | TBA | May 30, 2014 | N/A |
| 40 | 14 | "Betty for President" | TBA | May 30, 2014 | N/A |
| 41 | 15 | "Betty Needs A Date" | TBA | September 8, 2017 | N/A |
| 42 | 16 | "What Every Girl Needs to Know" | TBA | September 8, 2017 | N/A |
| 43 | 17 | "Betty Seeks World Peace" | TBA | September 11, 2017 | N/A |
| 44 | 18 | "The Cable Guy" | TBA | September 11, 2017 | N/A |
| 45 | 19 | "Young Betty" | TBA | September 12, 2017 | N/A |
| 46 | 20 | "'Survivor' Betty" | TBA | September 12, 2017 | N/A |
