= Model (Louie) =

- Louie episode
- Episode no.: Season 4 Episode 2
- Directed by: Louis C.K.
- Written by: Louis C.K.
- Cinematography by: Paul Koestner
- Editing by: Louis C.K.
- Production code: XCK04002
- Original release date: May 5, 2014
- Running time: 24 minutes

Guest appearances
- Yvonne Strahovski as Blake; Jerry Seinfeld as Himself; Victor Garber as Louie's Lawyer

Episode chronology
← Previous "Back"	Next → "So Did the Fat Lady"
- Louie (season 4)

"Model" is the second episode of the fourth season of the American comedy-drama television series Louie. It is the 41st overall episode of the series and was written and directed by Louis C.K., who also serves as the lead actor. It was released on FX on May 5, 2014, airing back-to-back with the previous episode, "Back".

The series follows Louie, a fictionalized version of C.K., a comedian and newly divorced father raising his two daughters in New York City. In the episode, Louie helps Jerry Seinfeld in a benefit, which culminates in disaster. After the events, he spends the day with one of the benefit's models.

According to Nielsen Media Research, the episode was seen by an estimated 0.91 million household viewers. The episode received critical acclaim, with critics praising the performances, guest stars and themes. For the episode, Louis C.K. received a nomination for Outstanding Lead Actor in a Comedy Series at the 66th Primetime Emmy Awards.

== Plot ==
Louie's lonely efforts to get women at the comedy club to go out with him have all failed, and a waitress firmly tells him that forcing women to have to reject him is wrong. Jerry Seinfeld later meets with Louie (Louis C.K.) at a bar. He plans to do a benefit in East Hampton and he wants Louie to introduce him. Louie accepts, agreeing to avoid certain topics during his introduction. However, Louie makes a poor impression by not wearing a suit (Jerry didn't give him ANY heads-up about the dress code) and his jokes don't land with the audience. When he leaves, Jerry describes his act as a "disaster" and makes jokes about Louie's introduction.

As he leaves, he is approached by a model, Blake (Yvonne Strahovski), who liked his work even though she deems it was awful for the audience. She takes him on her car to her house, where she decides to go swimming in the beach at night. At home, she kisses Louie and they have sex. Later, she decides to tickle him, despite Louie's protests. He accidentally punches her in the face, knocking her unconscious and forcing him to call an ambulance. Louie is punched by Blake's father and gets arrested. Jerry sends a lawyer (Victor Garber) to help him, informing Louie that Blake's vision was damaged. The lawyer tells him that even though the rich can in fact send the poor (like Louie) to jail, they're OK settling in this case if Louie will pay millions of dollars in monthly civil payment installments for the rest of his life. Louie shares the anecdote to the opening-scene waitress, who sympathizes with him and offers to hang out with him. In the end, Louie somehow looks happy.

== Production ==
=== Development ===
In April 2014, FX confirmed that the second episode of the season would be titled "Model", and that it would be written and directed by series creator and lead actor Louis C.K. This was C.K.'s 41st writing and directing credit.

== Reception ==
=== Viewers ===
In its original American broadcast, "Model" was seen by an estimated 0.91 million household viewers. This was a slight decrease in viewership from the previous episode, which was watched by 0.94 million viewers.

=== Critical reviews ===
"Model" received critical acclaim. Matt Fowler of IGN gave the episode an "amazing" 9.5 out of 10 and wrote in his verdict, "'Model' was landmark Louie. Just an uncomfortable, schlubby win in every way. From Louie being severely underdressed at an event meant for trillionaires, to him slipping on the wet floor right behind his dream girl, just about everything the guy touched turned to s***. And all the while, Seinfeld was there to give disapproving gazes and chastising words. It was a hilariously horrific episode with an amazing payoff."

Alan Sepinwall of HitFix wrote, "the story in 'Model' feels in a way like C.K. taking up the old comedian's challenge about how any topic, no matter how taboo, can be made funny with the right approach. But it also feels like part of the theme set up in 'Back,' which is that Louie has become completely resigned to all the miseries in his life." The A.V. Club gave the episode an "A" grade and wrote, "'Model' is absolutely brilliant television. It's like nothing I've ever seen, and it makes me so glad to have Louie back. It's, at once, a perfect little jewel of a flight of fancy on Louis C.K.'s part, while it's simultaneously a parody of anxiety dreams, a commentary on straight men's secret fears of what might happen if they ever ended up with one of the beautiful women they ogle, and a really weird parable about vampire capitalism."

Danielle Henderson of Vulture gave the episode a perfect 5 star rating out of 5 and wrote, "Only Louis C.K. can turn a story about punching a woman into a parable about class, and a parable about class into an allegory for violence against women, all while still being funny." Jake Cole of Slant Magazine wrote, "Louie has covered provocative sexual material before, from a deconstruction of the Manic Pixie Dream Girl trope to a depiction of male rape. In those instances, the series balanced pitch-black humor with thoughtfulness. Here, however, Louie's unwitting assault is played simply as a macabre joke, and not since Louie reduced his mother to tears in the first season has the series flirted with such pointless cruelty. This could have been ameliorated by a stronger focus on Louie's mortified embarrassment, but an extended riff on him being sued by the woman's wealthy family derails any morbid humor by turning Louie into a victim of circumstance and not a grimly clumsy buffoon."

Joe Matar of Den of Geek gave the episode a 4.5 rating out of 5 and wrote, "In sharp contrast to the season premiere which changed plot focus from scene to scene, 'Model' sticks to one narrative throughout. However, it still maintains Louie's quality of being tonally in flux. The result is a more satisfying storyline than that of the previous episode while still featuring all the emotional trappings of this series at its best." Paste gave the episode an 8.1 out of 10 and wrote, "'Model' was a misfire, albeit a largely enjoyable one, especially before the story becomes weirdly didactic."

=== Accolades ===
Louis C.K. submitted the episode to support his nomination for Outstanding Lead Actor in a Comedy Series at the 66th Primetime Emmy Awards. He would lose to Jim Parsons for The Big Bang Theory.
