= Betty White's Off Their Rockers =

American comedy television series

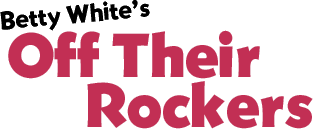
- Genre: Comedy
- Based on: Benidorm Bastards
- Developed by: Tim Van Aelst
- Written by: Kevin Healey
- Directed by: Tim Gibbons; Guy Shalem
- Presented by: Betty White
- Starring: Reatha Grey; Michael Yama; Nick De Mauro; Ann Benson; Michael Alaimo; Richard Reicheg; Lou Beatty Jr.; Melanie Seacat
- Narrated by: Jennifer DuMont; Dorian Frankel
- Theme music composer: Dee Snider
- Opening theme: "We're Not Gonna Take It"
- Ending theme: "We're Not Gonna Take It"
- Composer: Vanacore Music
- Country of origin: United States
- Original language: English
- No. of seasons: 3
- No. of episodes: 46 (list of episodes)

Production
- Executive producers: Chris Coelen; Lee Hupfield; Emma Conway; Betty White; Tim Van Aelst; Eli Lehrer; Mary Donahue; Paul Hardy
- Running time: 21 minutes
- Production companies: Kinetic Content; Albert Enterprises Inc.; Hallock-Healey Entertainment (season 1)

Original release
- Network: NBC (seasons 1–2); Lifetime (season 3)
- Release: January 16, 2012 – September 12, 2017

Betty White's Off Their Rockers is an American comedy television series launched in 2012 that was broadcast on NBC for its first two seasons and Lifetime for its third. The series is hosted by Betty White, and is based on the Belgian television format Benidorm Bastards.

== Production ==
A sneak preview was released on January 16, 2012, in tribute to Betty White's 90th birthday. The show officially premiered April 4, 2012. White hosts the series, and also serves as an executive producer for the show.

On May 13, 2012, NBC renewed the series for a second season in the mid-season schedule. On July 11, 2013, The Hollywood Reporter reported that NBC had canceled the series, citing a drop-off in ratings and low DVR viewership.

It was announced on October 18, 2013, that Lifetime had revived the series for a twenty episode third season. Season 3 premiered on February 28, 2014, and was confirmed for 20 episodes, but in mid-season, the series took a three-year hiatus and resumed broadcast in September 2017.

== Premise ==
The elderly play pranks on members of the younger generation, in the manner of Candid Camera, Trigger Happy TV, or Punk'd. It is based on the Belgian television format Benidorm Bastards.

== Episodes ==
Season	Episodes	Originally released		
Season	Episodes	First released	Last released	Network
1	12	January 16, 2012	May 23, 2012	NBC
2	14	January 8, 2013	July 9, 2013	NBC
3	20	February 28, 2014	September 12, 2017	Lifetime

== International broadcasts ==
In Canada, the series began broadcasting on CTV on January 16, 2012, in the Monday 8:00 p.m. timeslot, as a special preview, but moved to Wednesday at 8:00 p.m. on the CTV Two television system on April 4, 2012, after airing the first special preview episode. Since 2017, the series has run on CHCH.

In Norway, it started running on TVNorge on July 4, 2012.

In Germany, it started running on Prosieben.

In Australia, the program airs on the Comedy Channel, with a local version that premiered in 2012.

In New Zealand, the program aired on TVNZ 2 Sundays at 7.30pm, later shifted to Saturdays at 6pm.

In Finland, the program airs on TV5.

In the United Kingdom, ITV announced its own adaptation of the show. Following the American adaptation, it was also entitled Off Their Rockers but with different characters. The first episode aired April 7, 2013. The UKTV channel Watch began airing the US version on 13 August 2014.

In Serbia, the program airs on Prva Plus.

In the Netherlands, the program airs on RTL4 but is renamed Benidorm Bastards USA.

In Ireland, the program airs on TV3.

In Brazil, the original show airs on paid channel Multishow from Mondays to Fridays, and the local version airs on Sundays by SBT.

In India, the original show was aired on 10 September 2015 on Comedy Central India on Monday to Friday at 10:00 p.m.

== Online media ==
In the United States, users could watch full episodes of the NBC season on the network's official website. In Canada, people could watch full episodes on the CTV official website.

== Awards and nominations ==
Year	Association	Category	Nominated work	Result
2012	64th Primetime Emmy Awards	Outstanding Host for a Reality or Reality-Competition Program	Betty White	Nominated
2013	65th Primetime Emmy Awards	Outstanding Host for a Reality or Reality-Competition Program	Betty White	Nominated
2014	66th Primetime Emmy Awards	Outstanding Host for a Reality or Reality-Competition Program	Betty White	Nominated
