= Louie season 4 =

Louie
- Season 4
- DVD cover
- Starring: Louis C.K.
- No. of episodes: 14

Release
- Original network: FX
- Original release: May 5 – June 16, 2014

Season chronology
- ← Previous; Season 3 Next → Season 5

The fourth season of the American television comedy series Louie premiered on May 5, 2014, and concluded on June 16, 2014. It consists of fourteen episodes (an additional episode more than previous seasons), most running approximately 23 minutes in length. FX broadcast the fourth season on Mondays at 10:00 and 10:30 pm in the United States with back-to-back episodes. The season was produced by 3 Arts Entertainment and the executive producers were Louis C.K., Dave Becky and M. Blair Breard.

Louie was created, written and directed by Louis C.K., who stars as a fictionalized version of himself, a comedian and newly divorced father raising his two daughters in New York City. The show has a loose format atypical for television comedy series, consisting of largely unconnected storylines and segments (described as "extended vignettes") that revolve around Louie's life, punctuated by live stand-up performances.

== Production ==
FX announced in July 2012 that it had renewed Louie for a fourth season to consist of 13 episodes, and was later confirmed in October 2012 that the season would be delayed from airing in summer 2013 to May 2014, to give more time for Louie C.K. to develop the season. C.K. said, "I want season four to go somewhere new...I'm looking back to when I did the first season and the time I took to do the show and decide which directions to go in and I want that back again. I want a little breathing room." In March 2014, FX announced the season would premiere on May 5, 2014, moving to Mondays and would air back-to-back episodes for seven consecutive weeks, containing an additional fourteenth episode. C.K. said that the fourth season would include a multi-part, connected storyline after the third episode.

C.K. collaborated with comedian Steven Wright (who previously guest starred on the series as himself) on some of the scripts for the fourth season, and Wright is credited as a consulting producer for the season. According to guest star Jeremy Renner, Philip Seymour Hoffman was supposed to appear in an episode this season, however, Hoffman died in February 2014. Episodes 11 and 12, "In the Woods" have an extended run time of an hour and a half (with commercials).

== Cast ==
=== Main cast ===
- Louis C.K. as Louie

=== Recurring cast ===
- Hadley Delany as Lilly (9 episodes)
- Ursula Parker as Jane (9 episodes)
- Susan Kelechi Watson as Janet (7 episodes)
- Eszter Balint as Amia (6 episodes)
- Ellen Burstyn as Evanka (5 episodes)
- Pamela Adlon as Pamela (4 episodes) / Cable Phone Voice (1 episode)
- Todd Barry as Todd (4 episodes)
- Nick DiPaolo as Nick (4 episodes)
- Charles Grodin as Dr. Bigelow (4 episodes)
- Jim Norton as Jim (4 episodes)
- Robert Kelly as Bobby (2 episodes)
- Amy Landecker as Louie's Mom (2 episodes)
- Jeremy Renner as Jeff Davis (2 episodes)
- Skipp Sudduth as Mr. Hoffman (2 episodes)

=== Guest stars ===
- F. Murray Abraham as Louie's Dad ("In the Woods Part 2")
- Dave Attell as Dave ("So Did the Fat Lady")
- Sarah Baker as Vanessa ("So Did the Fat Lady")
- Edward Burns as Ed ("So Did the Fat Lady")
- Rick Crom as Rick ("Back")
- Greg Fitzsimmons as Greg ("Elevator Part 5")
- Victor Garber as Louie's Lawyer ("Model")
- Marc Maron as Marc ("Pamela Part 3")
- Jerry Seinfeld as Jerry ("Model")
- Sarah Silverman as Sarah ("Back")
- Yvonne Strahovski as Blake ("Model")

== Episodes ==
No. overall	No. in season	Title	Directed by	Written by	Original release date	Prod. code	U.S. viewers (millions)
40	1	"Back"	Louis C.K.	Louis C.K.	May 5, 2014	XCK04001	0.94
Louie hurts his back when shopping for a vibrator after one of his friends suggests it.
41	2	"Model"	Louis C.K.	Louis C.K.	May 5, 2014	XCK04002	0.91
Jerry Seinfeld asks Louie to introduce him at a benefit in the Hamptons, but Louis is unprepared and the act is a disaster. After, Louie is invited to the home of a model (Yvonne Strahovski) who says she likes his act, but things turn very wrong very quickly.
42	3	"So Did the Fat Lady"	Louis C.K.	Louis C.K.	May 12, 2014	XCK04003	0.81
Louie is asked out by an overweight woman (Sarah Baker) who works at the comedy club, but he is hesitant to accept because he wants to be with someone thinner.
43	4	"Elevator Part 1"	Louis C.K.	Louis C.K.	May 12, 2014	XCK04004	0.68
When taking the subway with his two daughters, Jane decides to get off the subway before it departs, forcing Louie and Lilly to go back and get her. When returning to his apartment building, Louie helps out an old lady (Ellen Burstyn) who is stuck in an elevator, and is thanked by the lady's non-English speaking niece who gives him a tart.
44	5	"Elevator Part 2"	Louis C.K.	Louis C.K.	May 19, 2014	XCK04005	0.60
Louie has a couple of nice shopping trips, sandwiched around him getting to know more about his elderly Hungarian neighbor and her attractive niece, dealing with Jane's latest problems at her school, and disagreeing with his ex-wife about the virtues of private school.
45	6	"Elevator Part 3"	Louis C.K.	Louis C.K.	May 19, 2014	XCK04006	0.57
Louie runs into Pamela again and eschews her vague romantic interest, then learns Amia is leaving the U.S. soon and resolves to enjoy the time before she returns to Hungary. He also avoids planning for Jane's future and gets advice from a curt Dr. Bigelow.
46	7	"Elevator Part 4"	Louis C.K.	Louis C.K.	May 26, 2014	XCK04007	0.51
Louie and Janet see a therapist to seek advice on how to deal with Jane. A flashback shows a younger Louie and Janet as they plan to divorce, but they stay together and later end up getting pregnant with their first child.
47	8	"Elevator Part 5"	Louis C.K.	Louis C.K.	May 26, 2014	XCK04008	0.44
Louie takes Amia to the Comedy Cellar, and Louie's friend Todd Barry describes his gloriously self-absorbed typical day as an adult with no wife or kids. Louie helps Evanka yet again when she is found unconscious in the elevator. Louie and Amia's relationship takes a gloomy turn after they spend the night together.
48	9	"Elevator Part 6"	Louis C.K.	Louis C.K.	June 2, 2014	XCK04009	0.61
A hurricane hits New York City causing Louie to help Janet and his children evacuate to safety. Louie and Amia peacefully end their relationship.
49	10	"Pamela Part 1"	Louis C.K.	Louis C.K.	June 2, 2014	XCK04010	0.71
After his break-up with Amia, Louie tries to reconnect with Pamela and ends up crossing every line.
50 51	11 12	"In the Woods"	Louis C.K.	Louis C.K.	June 9, 2014	XCK04011 XCK04012	0.60
Louie catches Lilly smoking marijuana. In flashbacks, a thirteen-year-old Louie and his friends discover marijuana and its pitfalls for themselves.
52	13	"Pamela Part 2"	Louis C.K.	Louis C.K. & Pamela Adlon	June 16, 2014	XCK04013	0.60
Louie takes Pamela on a romantic date to an outlandish art exhibit, then to the park for a lovely evening under the stars. Pamela finally embraces Louie as her lover.
53	14	"Pamela Part 3"	Louis C.K.	Louis C.K. & Pamela Adlon	June 16, 2014	XCK04014	0.56
Louie wants his romance with Pamela to welcome emotions. However, Pamela articulates disgust towards expressing her feelings.

== Reception ==
=== Reviews ===
The fourth season of Louie received universal acclaim from critics, receiving a Metacritic score of 93 out of 100, based on 28 reviews. Robert Lloyd of the Los Angeles Times wrote that "Each [episode] stands on its own as a TV art film, an independent work of short fiction." Andrew Romano of The Daily Beast wrote that "Season 4 is just as brilliant as the seasons that preceded it." On Rotten Tomatoes, the season has an approval rating of 93% with an average score of 8.9 out of 10 based on 43 reviews. The website's critical consensus reads, "Thanks to Louis C.K.'s unique brand of awkward, brutally honest humor, Louie remains one of the best written and most relatable comedies on television."

=== Ratings ===
The season 4 premiere received 941,000 total viewers, a 19 percent boost over last season's average.

=== Accolades ===
For the 30th TCA Awards, Louie won for Outstanding Achievement in Comedy and Louis C.K. received a nomination for Individual Achievement in Comedy. For the 4th Critics' Choice Television Awards, Louie received nominations for Best Comedy Series, C.K. for Best Actor in a Comedy Series, and Sarah Baker for Best Guest Performer in a Comedy Series. For the 66th Primetime Emmy Awards, the series was nominated for Outstanding Comedy Series, and Louie C.K. was nominated for Outstanding Lead Actor in a Comedy Series and Outstanding Directing for a Comedy Series for the episode "Elevator, Part 6", and won for Outstanding Writing for a Comedy Series for the episode "So Did the Fat Lady". For the 67th Writers Guild of America Awards, the series won for Best Comedy Series and C.K. won for Best Episodic Comedy for "So Did the Fat Lady". For the 21st Screen Actors Guild Awards, C.K. was nominated for Best Comedy Actor. For the 72nd Golden Globe Awards, C.K. was nominated for Best Actor – Television Series Musical or Comedy. For the 67th Directors Guild of America Awards, C.K. was nominated for Outstanding Directing – Comedy Series for the episode "Elevator Part 6".

== Broadcast ==
The season premiered on OSN First Comedy HD in the Middle East on September 4, 2014.
