= Back (Louie) =

- Louie episode
- Episode no.: Season 4 Episode 1
- Directed by: Louis C.K.
- Written by: Louis C.K.
- Cinematography by: Paul Koestner
- Editing by: Louis C.K.
- Production code: XCK04001
- Original release date: May 5, 2014
- Running time: 22 minutes

Guest appearances
- Charles Grodin as Dr. Bigelow; Sarah Silverman as Sarah; Todd Barry as Todd; Rick Crom as Rick; Nick Di Paolo as Nick; Jim Norton as Jim; William Stephenson as William; Hadley Delany as Lilly; Ursula Parker as Jane

Episode chronology
← Previous "New Year's Eve"	Next → "Model"
- Louie (season 4)

"Back" is the first episode of the fourth season of the American comedy-drama television series Louie. It is the 40th overall episode of the series and was written and directed by Louis C.K., who also serves as the lead actor. It was released on FX on May 5, 2014, airing back-to-back with the follow-up episode, "Model".

The series follows Louie, a fictionalized version of C.K., a comedian and newly divorced father raising his two daughters in New York City. In the episode, Louie decides to buy a vibrator when a friend suggests it makes for a better experience.

According to Nielsen Media Research, the episode was seen by an estimated 0.94 million household viewers. The episode received critical acclaim, with critics praising the directing, writing and humor.

== Plot ==
Louie (Louis C.K.) is annoyed by the noise that the waste collectors make, preventing him from sleeping. This escalates when the collectors break into his house to make more noise and destroying his bedroom. He laments his situation to a friend, who suggests he should abandon his kids so he can have more free time.

During a poker night, Louie is told by one of the attendees that he uses a vibrator for satisfaction, explaining that it makes a better experience than simply masturbating. Louie decides to go to a sex shop to buy one, but is forced to leave when he experiences back pain. He visits a new doctor in the building, Bigelow (Charles Grodin), for help. However, Dr. Bigelow only suggests that he use his back as intended, acknowledging that he will have back pain sometimes. As Louie leaves, the receptionist shows him that she helps her back pain by using a vibrator in her back. This prompts Louie to go back and buy the vibrator.

== Production ==
=== Development ===
In April 2014, FX confirmed that the first episode of the season would be titled "Back", and that it would be written and directed by series creator and lead actor Louis C.K. This was C.K.'s 40th writing and directing credit.

== Reception ==
=== Viewers ===
In its original American broadcast, "Back" was seen by an estimated 0.94 million household viewers. This was a 118% increase in viewership from the previous episode, which was watched by 0.43 million viewers with a 0.2 in the 18-49 demographics.

=== Critical reviews ===
"Back" received critical acclaim. Matt Fowler of IGN gave the episode an "amazing" 9.5 out of 10 and wrote in his verdict, "As mentioned earlier, 'Back' was a great sampler of Louie - for both fans of the show and those who've never seen. The lovable "can do no right" lug was back and in fine self-loathing form. He got to play parent, hang around with his buddies, and suffer abject humiliation: the Louie trifecta. Most importantly, as it pertains to the series, it gave us another great "you never know where Louie's day will take him" episode. It didn't break any new ground, but it was a nice re-entry point."

Alan Sepinwall of HitFix wrote, "Many things happen in 'Back,' and we'll get to those in a minute, but it's all building up to Louie's visit to Dr. Bigelow, where he's told that the reason his back hurts is entirely a matter of evolution. The human back wasn't designed to be vertical all the time, and we're about 20,000 years away from the design being fully corrected." The A.V. Club gave the episode an "A–" grade and wrote, "By framing the flowers as such, C.K. there's a funereal thread subliminally laced into 'Back.' But nobody's dying and nobody's dead — everyone's just exhausted. 'Back' mirrors that state: It's not a logy episode, but it is a depiction of how someone winds up feeling as logy as Louie might when he picks up Lilly and Jane from school. Bolting from one part of the protagonist's day to the next, the direction and the pacing key the viewer into Louie's exhaustion."

Danielle Henderson of Vulture gave the episode a 4 star rating out of 5 and wrote, "The beautiful chaos of this show often makes it difficult to find a connecting thread, but the easily identifiable theme of this premiere is Louie's well-covered focus on being old and tired, which he introduces brilliantly with the bane of every sleep-deprived city dweller's existence — sanitation workers." Jake Cole of Slant Magazine wrote, "That twist on clichéd midlife concerns finds its fullest expression when Louie collapses on a sidewalk after fleeing the sex shop, only to receive aid from a much older woman, who not only confidently flags a taxi for him, but even helps him to his feet. Louie specializes in these kinds of encounters, in which expectations aren't so much reversed as dissipated by a broad spectrum of possibility, bringing C.K.'s strange scenarios closer to reality."

Joe Matar of Den of Geek wrote, "'Back,' of course, has no interest in continuing or touching upon past plots whatsoever. However, that lack of connection with what came before it establishes an overall consistency with the rest of the series. In addition to being disconnected from what came before it, the scenes that make up 'Back' are largely unrelated to one another and alternate in tone, resulting in an episode that is surreal, dark, awkward, and hilarious. In other words, it serves as a reasonable encapsulation of what we've come to expect from Louie." Paste gave the episode an 8.1 out of 10 and wrote, "All of the material seems to flow easily and never feels forced, with one bit leading to the next without a need for a segue. There’s a primary narrative about Louie deciding, on the advice of one of his poker buddies, to pick up a vibrator, which takes over the second half of the episode, but even this comes together in such a natural way that it nearly eludes the show."
