= Pamela (Louie) =

- Louie episodes
- Episode nos.: Season 4 Episodes 10, 13 & 14
- Directed by: Louis C.K.
- Written by: Louis C.K. (Part 1 & 2 & 3); Pamela Adlon (Part 2 & 3)
- Cinematography by: Paul Koestner
- Editing by: Louis C.K.
- Production codes: XCK04010; XCK04013; XCK04014
- Original release dates: June 2, 2014 (Part 1); June 16, 2014 (Part 2 & 3)
- Running time: 70 minutes

Guest appearances
- Part 1: Pamela Adlon as Pamela; Charles Grodin as Dr. Bigelow; Hadley Delany as Lilly; Ursula Parker as Jane; Part 2: Pamela Adlon as Pamela; Susan Kelechi Watson as Janet; Gary Wilmes as Patrick; Hadley Delany as Lilly; Ursula Parker as Jane; Part 3: Pamela Adlon as Pamela; Susan Kelechi Watson as Janet; Gary Wilmes as Patrick; Hadley Delany as Lilly; Ursula Parker as Jane

Episode chronology
← Previous "Elevator; In the Woods"	Next → "In the Woods; Pot Luck"
- Louie (season 4)

"Pamela" is the tenth, thirteenth and fourteenth episodes and season finale of the fourth season of the American comedy-drama television series Louie. They are the 49th, 52nd and 53rd overall episodes of the series and they were written and directed by Louis C.K., who also serves as the lead actor, with Pamela Adlon receiving co-writing credit for "Part 2" and "Part 3". It was released on FX; with "Part 1" airing on June 2, 2014, and "Part 2" and "Part 3" airing on June 16, 2014.

The series follows Louie, a fictionalized version of C.K., a comedian and newly divorced father raising his two daughters in New York City. In the episodes, Louie decides to pursue a relationship with Pamela after breaking up with Amia.

According to Nielsen Media Research, "Part 1" was seen by an estimated 0.71 million household viewers and gained a 0.3 ratings share among adults aged 18–49, "Part 2" was seen by an estimated 0.60 million household viewers and gained a 0.4 ratings share among adults aged 18–49, and "Part 3" was seen by an estimated 0.56 million household viewers and gained a 0.3 ratings share among adults aged 18–49. The episodes received extremely positive reviews, who praised its emotional tone and performances. However, critics were polarized over the episodes' depiction of sexual assault.

== Plot ==
=== Part 1 ===
Louie (Louis C.K.) checks Amia's apartment, finding it empty save for a couch. Spotting Dr. Bigelow (Charles Grodin) outside, he asks for advice. Dr. Bigelow considers Louie as a "classic idiot" for believing in love, warning him that he should cherish the heartbreak, as the real "bad part" is forgetting about Amia.

Louie then meets with Pamela (Pamela Adlon) about pursuing a relationship as she previously suggested. However, Pamela declines, especially as Louie is only going after her just because of the break-up. Despite this, Pamela agrees in babysitting his girls while Louie performs two shows. At the Comedy Cellar, Louie talks about God before addressing the topic of male supremacy.

Inspired by a pedestrian's talk about control, Louie returns to his apartment, finding a sleeping Pamela at his couch. When Pamela prepares to leave, Louie corners her, trying to kiss her despite her protests. Louie then tries to prevent her from leaving and to remove her clothes. Pamela breaks free, proclaiming "you can't even rape well." Louie then states that he does not believe her claim that she is no longer interested and that he wants to take control by kissing her. Pamela reluctantly allows it and leaves the apartment. Louie then raises his arms up, stating "Yes!" The next day, Louie accompanies the girls on the bus, where they ask him if Pamela is his girlfriend now.

=== Part 2 ===
Louie calls Pamela, asking her to go out with him to have some fun. Although reluctant, she accepts. They go to an art gallery, where they poke fun at the exhibitions. Their date extends to a restaurant, and they also walk through Central Park at night. Louie then brings out a blanket just so they can see the stars. He then surprises her by showing her a meteor shower, something she has never seen. Moved, Pamela shares a kiss with Louie.

Pamela stops at Louie's apartment to use the bathroom. Before leaving, he suggests she could stay. When she declines and deems they are not in a relationship, Louie flatly tells her to leave, stating that she either genuinely doesn't like him or does like him and hides it by treating him poorly and "either one...is a person I don't want to be with." Realizing he is serious about a relationship, she decides to stay by sending him pictures of her underwear, to which he does the same. She leads him to his bedroom, where they have sex. The following morning, the girls arrive at Louie's apartment and immediately take a liking to Pamela.

=== Part 3 ===
Louie returns home and finds that his furniture is being taken away. He discovers that Pamela gave them away so he can buy new stuff. While initially upset, he ends up laughing at the situation. To get back at her he makes her accompany him in taking the girls to Janet (Susan Kelechi Watson). Janet confuses Pamela, as she wonders who the real mother of the girls is. They return to the empty apartment where they have sex in the floor.

Louie takes Pamela to the Comedy Cellar. He is disappointed when she doesn't laugh at his act, although Pamela claims it was because he was staring at her. Louie also gets jealous when a fellow comedian announces that he got his own TV series. During a visit to her apartment, Louie says "I love you" to Pamela, but the latter does not express the same. Louie opens up about how Pamela does not want to do things like being known as his girlfriend or showing affection in public. After an argument he storms off. He is called back by Pamela who surprises him with a romantic bathtub. Despite being ashamed of his body he shows his chest for the first time to Pamela and gets in the bathtub. Pamela explains that while she understands Louie's concerns about their relationship, she still feels she cannot do so. She asks "Can this just be okay?", referring to being together in the bathtub. They exchange looks as the episode ends.

== Production ==
=== Development ===
In May 2014, FX confirmed that the tenth, thirteenth and fourteenth episode of the season would be titled "Pamela", and that they would be written and directed by series creator and lead actor Louis C.K., with Pamela Adlon receiving co-writing credit for "Part 2" and "Part 3". These episodes were C.K.'s 49th, 52nd and 53rd writing and directing credit, and Adlon's fourth and fifth writing credit.

== Reception ==
=== Viewers ===
==== Part 1 ====
In its original American broadcast, "Pamela Part 1" was seen by an estimated 0.71 million household viewers with a 0.3 in the 18-49 demographics. This means that 0.3 percent of all households with televisions watched the episode. This was a 16% increase in viewership from the previous episode, which was watched by 0.61 million viewers with a 0.3 in the 18-49 demographics.

==== Part 2 ====
In its original American broadcast, "Pamela Part 2" was seen by an estimated 0.60 million household viewers with a 0.4 in the 18-49 demographics. This means that 0.4 percent of all households with televisions watched the episode. This was even in viewership with the previous episode, which was watched by 0.60 million viewers with a 0.3 in the 18-49 demographics.

==== Part 3 ====
In its original American broadcast, "Pamela Part 3" was seen by an estimated 0.56 million household viewers with a 0.3 in the 18-49 demographics. This means that 0.3 percent of all households with televisions watched the episode. This was a slight decrease in viewership from the previous episode, which was watched by 0.61 million viewers with a 0.3 in the 18-49 demographics.

=== Critical reviews ===
==== Part 1 ====
"Pamela Part 1" received generally positive reviews from critics. Matt Fowler of IGN gave the episode a "great" 8.5 out of 10 and wrote in his verdict, "'Pamela Part 1' was the first episode in a while to give us a strong sampling of different Louie vignettes. All of which worked well on different levels. It's always fun to listen to Bigelow call Louie a "classic idiot" even though he himself would never admit to knowing all of life's answers. It's as if he's become a sage by default because Louie is so clueless. And Louie's prickly relationship with Pamela always gives us good material. And you do wonder, as stubborn as she is, if that horrible peck that Louie planted on her was her version of saying "okay, I'll date you." Because when we saw Louie with his girls at the end, they were asking if she was his new squeeze. And he avoided answering the question as if she was his actual girlfriend. Though he could just be delusional about the whole thing."

Alan Sepinwall of HitFix wrote, "As it turns out, 'Pamela Part 1' may as well have been called 'Elevator Part 7' in the way that everything in it flowed out of things Louie dealt with in his relationship with Amia, up to and including his decision to use the stairs rather than the elevator, and his stop in Ivanka's (mostly) empty apartment." Emily St. James of The A.V. Club gave the episode a "B" grade and wrote, "I'm giving 'Pamela (Part 1)' a relatively low grade, because it didn't seem nearly as cohesive to me as the show is at its best, but I think it's a fascinating half-hour all the same and a piece of television that proves a Rosetta stone to understanding much of the rest of the season and what Louis C.K. is up to with his much more integrated universe this year."

Danielle Henderson of Vulture gave the episode a 2 star rating out of 5 and wrote, "The episode ended with Louie and the kids on a bus talking about directions and yelling at a spitter, but I was still too shocked at the rapey behavior to even care. This episode is called 'Pamela 1,' so let's hope in the next installation she's coming back with a restraining order." Jake Cole of Slant Magazine wrote, "Maybe the episode already critiques itself, with Louie's stand-up bit about male supremacy as the status quo a dig at his subsequent behavior. Pamela's own chaotic inability to come to terms with how she feels about Louie also needs time to develop. But if these episodes form parts of larger arcs, they still force the viewer to consider them in their sectioned pieces, and for the moment, 'Pamela' seems like too much like a reflexive retreat from the profundities so deftly scrutinized in 'Elevator.'"

Joe Matar of Den of Geek gave the episode a 3.5 rating out of 5 and wrote, "It's a disturbing sequence that transitions into hilarity. Pamela doesn't seem too genuinely afraid of Louie once it's over, but one assumes it might also be hard to regard someone the same way you once did after they got rapey with you, no? I feel like it’s an unfortunate scene ultimately, because I guess I was really hoping for Louie and Pamela to one day have some kind of rosy, wonderful romance explosion resulting in a fun and funny relationship, but I don’t think we’re going to get that on this show." Paste gave the episode a 6.9 out of 10 and wrote, "It pushes the boundaries of the show, but for the first time this season, it pushed up not against a fictitious audience, but against the show itself. Saint Louis is being questioned, and it's a strong choice to end with."

==== Part 2 ====
"Pamela Part 2" received generally positive reviews from critics. Matt Fowler of IGN gave the episode a "great" 8.2 out of 10 and wrote in his verdict, "Once the ice caps melted between Louie and Pamela, and she was willing to talk to him as a (mostly) serious and sensual human being, it all felt right. And Pamela didn't even mind when Louie's daughters showed up unexpectedly the next morning and walked right in on her in Louie's bed. In fact, there were now two more females in the house she could use to make fun of Louie's mailbox, tree trunk body. "Pamela Part 2" showcased one of the things Louie does best as a series. It showed Louie out on a date with a nice, quirky girl. It's something that he can, for the most part, do right. It's afterwards where things get messy."

Alan Sepinwall of HitFix wrote, "Two weeks ago, the scene where Louie bars Pamela from leaving his apartment, demanding that she kiss him left a lot of viewers (this one included) wondering whether he intended to more directly confront the undertones of rape there, beyond Pamela joking that Louie is too stupid to even rape well. And if Parts 2 & 3 were designed as a response, the response came across as Louie understanding Pamela better than she understands herself, knowing that she has even more trouble dealing with her feelings than he does, and having to force them out of her through physical and/or verbal demands. If it isn't quite 'the lips say no, but the eyes say yes,' it's closer than I would hope CK meant to get." Erik Adams of The A.V. Club gave the episode a "B" grade and wrote, "'Pamela (Part 2)' doesn't back down from the uncomfortable conclusion of its predecessor, going so far as to re-stage the claustrophobic doorway confrontation from that episode's conclusion. It's as unnervingly aggressive as the first one. But Pamela gets to play the encounter on her terms this time, terms that are conducted over the telephone in a series of increasingly intimate photos, the volley of iPhone whooshes and other digital twinkling hilariously standing in for sounds of physical intimacy. These are both people who are known to keep others at a distance, so it's only natural that they'd come together with the aid of megapixels."

Danielle Henderson of Vulture gave the episode a perfect 5 star rating out of 5 and wrote, "Oh, so that's what's going on this season — Louie has been leaking his fucked-up frustrations about his ability to love on everyone within arm’s reach." Jake Cole of Slant Magazine wrote, "'Part 2' references Louie and Pamela's unnerving last encounter in a phone call where the two quickly mention the moment and move past it when Louie asks her out on a date. He takes her to an art gallery filled with various pieces of anti-art, including a bag of shit titled as such, a square canvas painted all-black and called 'Jews,' and a button connected to a speaker that blares a recording of the n-word, but at this point the series has enough scenes of Louie and Pamela proving their compatibility with like-minded sarcasm that for them to make fun of a pretentious art exhibit is low-hanging fruit."

Joe Matar of Den of Geek gave the episode a 3.5 rating out of 5 and wrote, "'Pamela Part 2' was about being on a date with Pamela and it did a pretty good job of conveying such an experience." Paste gave the episode a 7 out of 10 and wrote, "Now we return and, although Pamela is still around, the attempted rape is seemingly forgotten and what we're left with is yet another quirky romantic comedy. It's an ending that feels far from climatic and can't help but give the impression that Louis, the show's creator and one of the hardest working men in show business, took the easy way out for once."

==== Part 3 ====
"Pamela Part 3" received positive reviews from critics. Matt Fowler of IGN gave the episode a "great" 8.5 out of 10 and wrote in his verdict, "Louie capped off what felt, for the most part, like a full-season story. And with a happy ending no less. What might this mean going forward? Will Louie and Pamela still be a couple when the show returns for Season 5? I'm proud of the big lug for finally making it work with someone, but I also don't necessarily need this to become the new blueprint for the show."

Alan Sepinwall of HitFix wrote, "where the previous two seasons stealthily built to powerfully cathartic moments, this heavily serialized fourth season was one where the journey was ultimately more compelling than the destination it brought us and Louie to." Erik Adams of The A.V. Club gave the episode a "B+" grade and wrote, "After all of the drama and the reminiscing, the catastrophic flooding and the crippling legal debt, Louie pulls back to make a perfectly lovely romantic comedy, one that suggests some of the psychic scars and emotional wounds that informed these episodes have successfully been purged from the system."

Danielle Henderson of Vulture gave the episode a perfect 5 star rating out of 5 and wrote, "In the end, Pamela asks Louie, 'Is it okay to just be here? Liking each other?' and in the perfect end for this season, Louie doesn't answer." Jake Cole of Slant Magazine wrote, "Louie is so free-form that every season finale seems like it could work as a series conclusion, but this delivers so well on the show's overarching thematic and narrative movements that it wouldn't be a tragedy if the series stopped here."

Joe Matar of Den of Geek gave the episode a 4 rating out of 5 and wrote, "All things considered, if this is the end, it doesn't feel like the wrong way to go out." Paste gave the episode a 7 out of 10 and wrote, "It may have been a fitting end to this letdown of a season, but that's not a compliment. With Louie I sometimes have a difficult time judging how aware the show is or is not of its own political or story problems. How much irony is involved here, exactly? Regardless of that, what we ultimately have on the screen is a story with a retrograde view on male-female relationships surrounded by the ordinary trappings of a romantic comedy. These episodes aren't bad in that they’re not fun to watch; it’s that they’re artistically shallow and reliant on the same tropes as any other offering of the genre."
