= Os Velhinhos Se Divertem =

- Genre: Comedy
- Created by: Silvio Santos
- Inspired by: Benidorm Bastards
- Opening theme: We're Not Gonna Take It

Original release
- Release: 2011 – 2018

"Os Velhinhos se Divertem" is a segment on Hidden Cameras block shown within the Silvio Santos Program, broadcast on the Sistema Brasileiro de Televisão (SBT), from 2011 to 2018. The segment shows funny and unusual situations starring elderly actors who surprise people on the streets, in stores, in restaurants, and in other public places. Some pranks featuring Ruth Romcy were replayed.

== History ==
The segment "Os Velhinhos se Divertem" was created in 2011, based on the same format as the Belgian TV series called Benidorm Bastards, which also showed elderly people playing pranks on younger people. The segment was an idea of Silvio Santos himself, owner of SBT.

The Silvio Santos Program Team is responsible for the production, under the direction of Fernando Pelegio and the coordination of Ricardo Perez. The actors participating in the segment were chosen through auditions and received a fee for each recording. They also received guidance on how to act in different situations and how to improvise if something goes off-script.

The show is filmed in public locations in São Paulo, such as streets, squares, parks, shopping malls, and restaurants. Cameras are hidden in strategic spots to capture the reactions of the victims and the actors. The pranks are varied and involve themes such as dating, dancing, sports, technology, health, and even politics.

== Reception ==
The segment was considered a success with audiences and critics, being praised for its originality, quality, and respect for the elderly. Due to its positive reception, a second season was confirmed for 2012.
