= So Did the Fat Lady =

- Louie episode
- Episode no.: Season 4 Episode 3
- Directed by: Louis C.K.
- Written by: Louis C.K.
- Cinematography by: Paul Koestner
- Editing by: Louis C.K.
- Production code: XCK04003
- Original release date: May 12, 2014
- Running time: 22 minutes

Guest appearances
- Sarah Baker as Vanessa; Edward Burns as Ed; Robert Kelly as Bobby

Episode chronology
← Previous "Model"	Next → "Elevator"
- Louie (season 4)

"So Did the Fat Lady" is the third episode of the fourth season of the American comedy-drama television series Louie. It is the 42nd overall episode of the series and was written and directed by Louis C.K., who also serves as the lead actor. It was released on FX on May 12, 2014, airing back-to-back with the follow-up episode, "Elevator Part 1".

The series follows Louie, a fictionalized version of C.K., a comedian and newly divorced father raising his two daughters in New York City. In the episode, Louie is asked out by Vanessa, an overweight woman, and he hesitates on his decision.

According to Nielsen Media Research, the episode was seen by an estimated 0.81 million household viewers and gained a 0.4 ratings share among adults aged 18–49. The episode received extremely positive reviews from critics, with Baker's guest appearance receiving acclaim, although some viewed its message and monologue as heavy-handed. For the episode, Louis C.K. won Outstanding Writing for a Comedy Series at the 66th Primetime Emmy Awards.

== Plot ==
After a performance at the Comedy Cellar, Louie (Louis C.K.) is approached by an overweight woman, Vanessa (Sarah Baker). She wants to go out with him, but Louie does not feel comfortable with her. Despite wanting to lose weight, Louie and Bobby (Robert Kelly) go on a "bang-bang", during which they go to different places to eat complete meals. However, Louie feels embarrassed when Bobby tells their plan to a waitress.

Louie runs into Vanessa again, declining her suggestion. However, he changes his mind when she offers tickets to a New York Rangers game, deciding to go out for coffee with her. Their encounter goes well and both spend the rest of the day walking through the city. However, the day is ruined when Louie says "you are not fat", which annoys Vanessa as she considers herself to be. She is even more disappointed with Louie's dishonesty and how he perceives her for turning a date down earlier. While Louie wants to argue that he slept with overweight women before, Vanessa states that he never really "dated" an overweight woman. As she professes her desire to hold hands with someone, Louie decides to hold her hand. They walk away laughing, with Louie telling jokes while Vanessa replies "so did the fat lady."

== Production ==
=== Development ===
In April 2014, FX confirmed that the third episode of the season would be titled "So Did the Fat Lady", and that it would be written and directed by series creator and lead actor Louis C.K. This was C.K.'s 42nd writing and directing credit.

=== Casting ===
When questioned about her monologue, Sarah Baker explained her interpretation, "My interpretation of it was that she's [telling Louie], 'You saying, 'You're not fat,' is like saying, 'The worst thing a woman can be is fat, so I'm not gonna call you that.' Whereas she's kinda like, 'Yeah, I'm fat. You know, I'm nice, I'm funny, I'm cute — so who cares?' You know, she asked him out, and he said no, but she didn't really know why. And in that moment she's like, 'Oh, that is what this is all about. You think being fat is terrible.' That's when it clicks for her, like, 'Oh, you're not as great as I thought you were.'"

== Reception ==
=== Viewers ===
In its original American broadcast, "So Did the Fat Lady" was seen by an estimated 0.81 million household viewers with a 0.4 in the 18-49 demographics. This means that 0.4 percent of all households with televisions watched the episode. This was a 11% decrease in viewership from the previous episode, which was watched by 0.91 million viewers.

=== Critical reviews ===
"So Did the Fat Lady" received extremely positive reviews from critics. Matt Fowler of IGN gave the episode a "great" 8.5 out of 10 and wrote in his verdict, "'So Did the Fat Lady' was a funny, memorable episode of Louie, that played with both genuine emotions and satire. Just look at comedian Jim Norton's heightened reaction of repulsion to Vanessa and then look at comedian Dave Attell's sweet and real reaction to her later on where he gave her a genuine hug and wasn't shy about being friendly and flirty with her. Perhaps a vast difference between the self-confidence of the two performers, though Norton's moment meant to be more of a grim, comedic beat. Sarah Baker was wonderful in this episode as a confident, self-professed non-fan of comedy who pretty much filled her entire speech pattern with disarming one-liners."

Alan Sepinwall of HitFix wrote, "If this is going to be the last standalone episode for a while, it was an awfully good one, as both an education of Louie piece and a showcase for guest star Sarah Baker." Erik Adams of The A.V. Club gave the episode an "A" grade and wrote, "If much of what's forming season four is what's going on in Louie's head, the coda of 'So Did The Fat Lady' places us squarely within that head, letting us see with Louie's eyes and hear with Louie's ears. But that's only part of it, because the camera’s mobile, giving us a chance to look at Louie from Vanessa's perspective or pulling away to put us in the shoes of the theoretical people 'standing over there,' looking at Louie and Vanessa. And the neat trick of the whole thing is that even as the show works from the headspace of its creator, it still has the capacity to speak in many voices."

Danielle Henderson of Vulture gave the episode a perfect 5 star rating out of 5 and wrote, "I mostly liked this episode, but it got a little heavy-handed at the end. Not all of us fat girls have a secret speech stored inside of us, or are content to replace the possibility of love with the immediacy of hand-holding. I like that Louie grabbed Vanessa's hand, but I hate that he did it to shut her up." Jake Cole of Slant Magazine wrote, "The self-contained nature of each episode likely means this lesson will stick with Louie about as well as Rick Crom's dignified takedown of Louie's 'ironic' use of homophobic slurs, but for the time being, 'So Did the Fat Lady' stands out as one of the show's high-water marks."

Joe Matar of Den of Geek gave the episode a 4.5 rating out of 5 and wrote, "on the whole, the stuff I mentioned notwithstanding, I believed in Vanessa as a person and Louie as a person and that this was a time in these people's lives where they had a bit of connection and Louie acted kind of like a dick, but ended up learning something from her. It was a solid Louie short film." Paste gave the episode a 6 out of 10 and wrote, "Here, Louis C.K. wanted to write a message, but instead of just typing it up on Twitter, he told it in a 22-minute television spot on FX and showed absolutely no respect for his audience. Rather than the joke, I would've preferred it if the episode ended with a 'The More You Know' tag."

=== Accolades ===
For the episode, Louis C.K. was nominated for Outstanding Writing for a Comedy Series at the 66th Primetime Emmy Awards. He would later win, marking the second time he would win the award.
