= In the Woods (Louie) =

- Louie episodes
- Episode nos.: Season 4 Episodes 11 & 12
- Directed by: Louis C.K.
- Written by: Louis C.K.
- Cinematography by: Paul Koestner
- Editing by: Louis C.K.
- Production codes: XCK04011; XCK04012
- Original release date: June 9, 2014
- Running time: 67 minutes

Guest appearances
- Part 1: Jeremy Renner as Jeff Davis; Devin Druid as Young Louie; Amy Landecker as Louie's Mom; Skipp Sudduth as Greg Hoffman; Cory Nichols as Brad; Oscar Wahlberg as Danny; Hadley Delany as Lilly; Part 2: Jeremy Renner as Jeff Davis; F. Murray Abraham as Louie's Dad; Devin Druid as Young Louie; Amy Landecker as Louie's Mom; Skipp Sudduth as Greg Hoffman; Cory Nichols as Brad; Oscar Wahlberg as Danny; Hadley Delany as Lilly

Episode chronology
← Previous "Pamela Part 1"	Next → "Pamela Part 2 & 3"
- Louie (season 4)

"In the Woods" is the eleventh and twelfth episodes of the fourth season of the American comedy-drama television series Louie. They are the 50th and 51st overall episodes of the series and they were written and directed by Louis C.K., who also serves as the lead actor. It was released on FX on June 9, 2014.

The series follows Louie, a fictionalized version of C.K., a comedian and newly divorced father raising his two daughters in New York City. In the episode, Louie catches Lilly smoking marijuana and remembers part of his childhood as he started using it. The episode is dedicated to the memory of Philip Seymour Hoffman, who was supposed to guest star in the episode.

According to Nielsen Media Research, the episode was seen by an estimated 0.60 million household viewers and gained a 0.3 ratings share among adults aged 18–49. The episodes received critical acclaim, with critics praising the character development, performances, tone, themes and lack of humor.

== Plot ==
=== Part 1 ===
While at the park, Louie (Louis C.K.) notes many kids smoking marijuana. He is then horrified to discover Lilly (Hadley Delany) smoking as well with her friends. He pulls her off to chastise her, although Lilly does not appear to care for her actions.

In flashbacks, 13-year-old Louie helps his chemistry teacher, Greg Hoffman (Skipp Sudduth), into explaining methane gas by lighting a flatulence on fire. He asks his classmate Laurie to the school dance, although he is neither accepted or declined. At the dance, Louie's friend introduces him to a cigarette of marijuana that he stole from his brother. To avoid getting in trouble, they go to the woods to smoke with another friend. They spend the night under the effects of marijuana.

When the brother is unable to provide more marijuana, Louie decides to ask local drug dealer Jeff Davis (Jeremy Renner). Jeff is impressed by Louie deciding to smoke for his age, but decides to continue providing him in exchange for some scales from school. He steals from his chemistry class, while his mother (Amy Landecker) suspects there is something about her son. When she confronts him, he angrily dismisses anything. Back in present day, Louie takes Lilly to his apartment, who angrily locks herself in her room.

=== Part 2 ===
The young Louie skips school to deliver the scales to Jeff, impressing him and his girlfriend Alison. He provides him with two ounces of marijuana, which Louie smokes with his friends and also distributes through school. However, during a meeting at a friends' house, Louie witnesses as his friend's brother brutally beats him for making noise, with the brother calling them losers for their habit.

One day, Louie is visited by his dad (F. Murray Abraham). His dad believes he is using drugs and calls him out on his actions, but Louie is not frightened, insulting him for being absent in his life. Later, one of Louie's friends announces that his mother caught his marijuana and will now be sent to Phillips Academy. A friend turns aggressive when he believes he told their parents and smashes his family car.

At school, Louie and Hoffman are called to the principal's office. The principal informs Hoffman that Louie stole ten scales for drugs, and due to their price, it constitutes grand theft. However, Hoffman refuses to believe Louie would commit that and calls out the principal for only basing his verdict on rumors and both he and Louie leave his office. Feeling guilty, Louie visits Jeff to get the scales back. Jeff refuses, especially as Louie gave all the marijuana away. Jeff mocks Louie for his stupidity, telling him that he will have to come up with a solution.

The next day, Louie finds that one of his friends was arrested for attacking a classmate. He is informed by the principal that he is aware that he took the scales, but won't do anything about it. He is willing to face budget cuts but he will take the hit for Louie, telling him he'll have to think of this moment whenever it is brought back. Louie later visits Hoffman, confessing to stealing the scales. That night, Louie is confronted by his mother for his attitude and he flees to the woods, crying. When she finds him sleeping in the garage, she decides to have him attend appointments with a therapist. The therapist suggests Louie used drugs to deal with his parents' divorce and that his indifference is an effect of the drug. He says he needs to stop using them, and work on himself, telling him his mom will always be there for him.

Back in present day, Louie prepares food for Lilly. When she asks if he will give him a talk, he replies "Goodbye to your childhood, I guess." He says he loves her and will always be there for her. This prompts Lilly to hug him, reconciling.

== Production ==
=== Development ===
In June 2014, FX confirmed that the eleventh and twelfth episode of the season would be titled "In the Woods", and that they would be written and directed by series creator and lead actor Louis C.K.. These episodes were C.K.'s 50th and 51st writing and directing credit.

=== Writing ===
The episode was inspired by C.K.'s childhood. According to C.K., he started smoking marijuana at 13, and ended up stealing 14 scales from his school for a local drug dealer.

=== Casting ===
According to Jeremy Renner, Philip Seymour Hoffman was supposed to guest star in the episode before his death in February 2014. The episode is dedicated to his memory.

== Reception ==
=== Viewers ===
In its original American broadcast, "In the Woods" was seen by an estimated 0.60 million household viewers with a 0.3 in the 18-49 demographics. This means that 0.3 percent of all households with televisions watched the episode. This was a 16% decrease in viewership from the previous episode, which was watched by 0.71 million viewers with a 0.3 in the 18-49 demographics.

=== Critical reviews ===
"In the Woods" received critical acclaim. Matt Fowler of IGN gave the episode an "amazing" 9.2 out of 10 and wrote in his verdict, "There were certainly times when it felt like 'In the Woods' could have gone the scared-straight route. All they had to do was have Louie actually tell Lilly what he'd gone through instead of merely remembering the events quietly to himself. But the point of the episode, besides sharing a very raw, close-to-the-bone story about Louie's formative years, was Louie himself realizing that he understood why Lilly had the joint in her hand. And that he'd inadvertently done, through his divorce, to Lilly what had been done to him. Of course, none of this is to say "Louie should have stayed married for his kids," because due to the way he and Janet converse with one another, it probably would have been even more damaging for them."

Alan Sepinwall of HitFix wrote, "Did this story need to be 66 minutes, plus ads? I imagine some of the beats could have been tightened up, but the loose atmosphere, and all the '70s/'80s soundalike rock on the score helped convey what Louie was (and wasn't) feeling during this hazy, stupid period of his life. I'm more curious to see next week's closing chapters of both 'Pamela' and season 4 as a whole, to get a sense of why C.K. decided now was the time to interrupt the present-day arc for so long, rather than concluding the season with the incredibly moving 'In the Woods.'" Emily St. James of The A.V. Club gave the episode an "A" grade and wrote, "In an already hazy season, 'In The Woods' comes on as one of the haziest episodes yet, shrouded in a fog of memory and melancholy. It's at once a kind of celebration of kids being kids and experimenting with drugs because they're not sure what else to do and one of the stranger anti-drug tales you'll ever see. It's a nervy, complex piece of work that digs into everything from notions of masculinity to the responsibilities adults bear toward children and vice versa."

Danielle Henderson of Vulture gave the episode a 4 star rating out of 5 and wrote, "This was an episode told primarily in flashbacks, since Louie needed to pull from his past to figure out what to do when he catches Lilly smoking pot at an outdoor festival. In his standup act, C.K. talks about using drugs as a kid and says that he can't in good faith tell anyone that drugs are bad; in a 2011 interview with Rolling Stone, he also said that by the time he got to high school, he 'was a recovered drug addict.' A lot of what happened in last night's episode felt like an apology to his former self." Jake Cole of Slant Magazine wrote, "Louie regularly courts controversy as it explores various subjects on C.K.'s mind. Sometimes it follows these threads to innovative and critical conclusions, and sometimes it just mines shocks for a joke. Regardless, the series is always unlike anything else on TV, and even when it's infuriating, it's compulsively watchable. But 'In the Woods' represents new terrain for the series: For the first time, it's truly, forgettably boring."

Joe Matar of Den of Geek gave the episode a 4 rating out of 5 and wrote, "There are no easy answers or straightforward conclusions here. Bad shit happens, good shit happens. Life kind of sucks. All parents can do is be around and ask you to try not to screw up so much. And somehow this almost lack of a message is really bittersweet and beautiful." Paste gave the episode a 9.1 out of 10 and wrote, "This is why it's always exciting to sit down for an episode of Louis in a way it isn't for any other show. You may end up getting ranted at for 10 minutes, but you're just as likely to end up with this type of lyrical beauty."
