= Elevator (Louie) =

- Louie episodes
- Episode nos.: Season 4 Episodes 4, 5, 6, 7, 8 & 9
- Directed by: Louis C.K.
- Written by: Louis C.K.
- Cinematography by: Paul Koestner
- Editing by: Louis C.K.
- Production codes: XCK04004; XCK04005; XCK04006; XCK04007; XCK04008; XCK04009
- Original release dates: May 12, 2014 (Part 1); May 19, 2014 (Part 2 & 3); May 26, 2014 (Part 4 & 5); June 2, 2014 (Part 6)
- Running time: 131 minutes

Guest appearances
- Part 1: Ellen Burstyn as Evanka; Eszter Balint as Amia; Susan Kelechi Watson as Janet; Hadley Delany as Lilly; Ursula Parker as Jane; Gary Wilmes as Patrick; Part 2: Ellen Burstyn as Evanka; Eszter Balint as Amia; Susan Kelechi Watson as Janet; Ursula Parker as Jane; Gary Wilmes as Patrick; Part 3: Ellen Burstyn as Evanka; Charles Grodin as Dr. Bigelow; Eszter Balint as Amia; Susan Kelechi Watson as Janet; Pamela Adlon as Pamela; Ursula Parker as Jane; Part 4: Eszter Balint as Amia; Susan Kelechi Watson as Janet; Denny Dillon as Therapist; Brooke Bloom as Young Janet; Conner O'Malley as Young Louie; Hadley Delany as Lilly; Ursula Parker as Jane; Part 5: Ellen Burstyn as Evanka; Charles Grodin as Dr. Bigelow; Eszter Balint as Amia; Todd Barry as Todd; Part 6: Ellen Burstyn as Evanka; Eszter Balint as Amia; Susan Kelechi Watson as Janet; Hadley Delany as Lilly; Ursula Parker as Jane

Episode chronology
← Previous "So Did the Fat Lady"	Next → "Pamela"
- Louie (season 4)

"Elevator" is the fourth through ninth episodes of the fourth season of the American comedy-drama television series Louie. They are the 43rd through 48th overall episodes of the series and they were written and directed by Louis C.K., who also serves as the lead actor. It was released on FX; with "Part 1" airing on May 12, 2014, "Part 2" and "Part 3" airing on May 19, 2014, "Part 4" and "Part 5" airing on May 26, 2014, and "Part 6" airing on June 2, 2014.

The series follows Louie, a fictionalized version of C.K., a comedian and newly divorced father raising his two daughters in New York City. In the episode, Louie meets an old lady and becomes interested in her Hungarian niece, Amia, despite the fact that she does not know English.

According to Nielsen Media Research, "Part 1" was seen by an estimated 0.68 million household viewers and gained a 0.3 ratings share among adults aged 18–49, "Part 2" was seen by an estimated 0.60 million household viewers and gained a 0.3 ratings share among adults aged 18–49, "Part 3" was seen by an estimated 0.57 million household viewers and gained a 0.3 ratings share among adults aged 18–49, "Part 4" was seen by an estimated 0.51 million household viewers and gained a 0.2 ratings share among adults aged 18–49, "Part 5" was seen by an estimated 0.44 million household viewers and gained a 0.2 ratings share among adults aged 18–49, and "Part 6" was seen by an estimated 0.61 million household viewers and gained a 0.3 ratings share among adults aged 18–49.

The episodes received extremely positive reviews, with critics praising the ambition and emotional tone. For "Elevator Part 6", Louis C.K. was nominated for Outstanding Directing for a Comedy Series at the 66th Primetime Emmy Awards.

== Plot ==
=== Part 1 ===
Jane (Ursula Parker) awakens in the middle of the night due to a bad dream. Louie (Louis C.K.) comforts her and gets her to sleep again.

The next day, Louie, Jane and Lilly (Hadley Delany) go to the subway, with Louie reiterating the "subway rules" in case of an emergency. After boarding the train, Jane, believing she is dreaming, hops off the train as the doors close, to Louie's horror. He and Lilly are then forced to all the way back to the station, where Louie scolds Jane for her actions, making her cry. They return to meet with Janet (Susan Kelechi Watson), with Louie informing her about the events. She also scolds Jane, telling her they are not in a dream.

At Louie's apartment building, a Hungarian old woman, Evanka (Ellen Burstyn) uses the elevator but suddenly the elevator gets stuck. As staff tries to take her out, she asks Louie to get her pills from her apartment. Louie is given the keys and retrieves the pills, noting a woman (Eszter Balint) sleeping on her couch. He goes back with Evanka, who asks him to inform the woman, her niece Amia, to wait for her. Louie returns to the apartment, but Amia, who does not speak English, scares him off. Later, Amia visits Louie to give her a tart for his actions. Despite not speaking the same language, they both have a laugh while he eats.

=== Part 2 ===
After shopping, Louie visits Evanka at her apartment to return her key, as well as to deliver her a basket of products to thank them for the tart. Their meeting is interrupted when Louie is called by the school, asked to pick up Jane following problems at the school. When he asks her what is happening, Jane replies that she hates school and gives many excuses that Louie does not buy. She eventually comes clean, explaining that she pulled a classmate's skirt. Louie and Janet talk about Jane's behavior. Janet considers sending her to private school, which Louie opposes.

Louie meets Amia again in the building and both decide to go out in the city. After helping her buy a hair dryer, they return to her apartment where they bid farewell and hug.

=== Part 3 ===
While at the market, Louie runs into Pamela (Pamela Adlon), who has returned from Europe. She explains that her relationship with her ex-husband is over and left him and her son in Barcelona. She wants to start a relationship with Louie, who states he is already seeing someone. While disappointed, she claims she is happy for him.

Louie visits Amia, but Evanka tells him that she will be leaving back for Hungary, as she lives with her son. This disappoints Louie, although Evanka tells her that Amia will leave within one month and that they can catch up during that time. Louie spends more time with her, but questions if they can go past "dating" considering she is leaving. At the building, he runs into Dr. Bigelow (Charles Grodin) and asks for advice. Dr. Bigelow simply states that no one cares about his relationships and tells him to "just pick a road and go down it or don't." To prove his point, he shows his three-legged dog, stating that despite the disability, the dog will just go forward with his life.

=== Part 4 ===
Louie continues going out with Amia, who is also spending time with Lilly and even teaches Jane how to play the violin. Per the school principal's suggestion, Jane attends therapy. The therapist tells Louie and Janet that perhaps her behavior may be because of their divorce. Louie blames himself for their failure, but the therapist says it is Janet's responsibility in fixing it, as Louie cannot control himself. They also get into an argument about Amia, as the girls will get sad when she leaves.

In a flashback, a young Louie (Conner O'Malley) and Janet (Brooke Bloom) argue in a hotel room, as their marriage has not progressed in the past two years. They decide that they are better off by divorcing, so they have sex for the last time. They gloat over the benefits of being separated but wonder what if Janet were to get pregnant.

=== Part 5 ===
With one week left before Amia leaves, Louie invites her to dine with his friends at the Comedy Cellar. Todd Barry notes that Louie may be wasting potential, describing that he enjoys having no wife and kids. He then proceeds to explain a lengthy sequence in which he worked to finally get his name sign to spell his name correctly.

At his building, Louie finds Evanka unconscious in the elevator. He asks Dr. Bigelow for help, and he helps him in awakening her, as she forgot to chew pills. Louie then helps Evanka in going upstairs. Louie later goes out with Amia before returning to his apartment. They kiss goodbye but eventually start passionately kissing and have sex for the first time. The next morning, they talk in bed, although Amia leaves after she proclaims "no good", leaving Louie confused.

=== Part 6 ===
As a hurricane makes landfall in New York, Louie chases Amia to a church. Amia opens up, but Louie is unable to understand her. He takes her home, where their conflict escalates as she starts shattering dishes. As the storm worsens and gravely affects Janet's area, Louie decides to go out and save Janet and the girls. Louie rents a car from Hertz and barely makes it through the flooded streets until he reaches Janet's house, taking her and the girls to safety.

After the storm passes, Louie and Amia go to eat at a Hungarian restaurant. There, Amia gives an English-speaking employee a letter so he can translate it to Louie. The letter states that she enjoyed her time with Louie, but New York is not her home and their personal lives will not allow them to be together. Louie peacefully accepts the separation, but states he wouldn't trade it for anything. They continue holding hands as the episode ends.

== Production ==
=== Development ===
In April and May 2014, FX confirmed that the fourth through ninth episode of the season would be titled "Elevator", and that they would be written and directed by series creator and lead actor Louis C.K. These episodes were C.K.'s 43rd, 44th, 45th, 46th, 47th and 48th writing and directing credit.

== Reception ==
=== Viewers ===
==== Part 1 ====
In its original American broadcast, "Elevator Part 1" was seen by an estimated 0.68 million household viewers with a 0.3 in the 18-49 demographics. This means that 0.3 percent of all households with televisions watched the episode. This was a 17% decrease in viewership from the previous episode, which was watched by 0.81 million viewers with a 0.4 in the 18-49 demographics.

==== Part 2 ====
In its original American broadcast, "Elevator Part 2" was seen by an estimated 0.60 million household viewers with a 0.3 in the 18-49 demographics. This means that 0.3 percent of all households with televisions watched the episode. This was a 12% decrease in viewership from the previous episode, which was watched by 0.68 million viewers with a 0.3 in the 18-49 demographics.

==== Part 3 ====
In its original American broadcast, "Elevator Part 3" was seen by an estimated 0.57 million household viewers with a 0.3 in the 18-49 demographics. This means that 0.3 percent of all households with televisions watched the episode. This was a slight decrease in viewership from the previous episode, which was watched by 0.60 million viewers with a 0.3 in the 18-49 demographics.

==== Part 4 ====
In its original American broadcast, "Elevator Part 4" was seen by an estimated 0.51 million household viewers with a 0.2 in the 18-49 demographics. This means that 0.2 percent of all households with televisions watched the episode. This was an 11% decrease in viewership from the previous episode, which was watched by 0.57 million viewers with a 0.3 in the 18-49 demographics.

==== Part 5 ====
In its original American broadcast, "Elevator Part 5" was seen by an estimated 0.44 million household viewers with a 0.2 in the 18-49 demographics. This means that 0.2 percent of all households with televisions watched the episode. This was a 14% decrease in viewership from the previous episode, which was watched by 0.51 million viewers with a 0.2 in the 18-49 demographics.

==== Part 6 ====
In its original American broadcast, "Elevator Part 6" was seen by an estimated 0.61 million household viewers with a 0.3 in the 18-49 demographics. This means that 0.2 percent of all households with televisions watched the episode. This was a 38% increase in viewership from the previous episode, which was watched by 0.44 million viewers with a 0.2 in the 18-49 demographics.

=== Critical reviews ===
==== Part 1 ====
"Elevator Part 1" received generally positive reviews from critics. Matt Fowler of IGN gave the episode a "good" 7.7 out of 10 and wrote in his verdict, "Louie delivered two scary scenarios involving transportation this week - each unsettling for different reasons. Though the second one was played for light laughs while the first seemed to just show us the occasional 'Holy S***!' struggles that come from being a parent and ambush us out of nowhere. The city just doesn't seem to be safe for the young or old, and it's up to the middle-aged to help those on the ends of the spectrum navigate the system. Good, but not great stuff. The thinnest offering of Season 4 so far."

Alan Sepinwall of HitFix wrote, "most of the section of Part 1 that actually deals with the elevator and Louie meeting his Eastern European neighbors felt entirely like a preamble to whatever's coming next. So the most memorable part of that episode involved Louie's subway misadventure with Jane, who, convinced she was still dreaming, hopped off the car to see what would happen. Having something genuinely bad happen to Jane doesn't feel like something even a show as elastic as Louie would do but even though everyone made it to Louie's ex-wife's apartment physically unscathed, that was an emotionally harrowing sequence." Emily St. James of The A.V. Club gave the episode a "B+" grade and wrote, "As indicated by its title, 'Elevator, Part 1' is the first part of a multi-part saga about... well, it's not immediately clear. The safe money is on this story being about what happens after Louie and the woman meet and hit it off and try to overcome their differences and fall in love. It's a fitting idea for the season to pursue as a centerpiece storyline."

Danielle Henderson of Vulture gave the episode a perfect 5 star rating out of 5 and wrote, "I'm used to being a little unmoored with Louie, and part of its charm is Louis C.K.'s ability to defy expectations and push deeper into those moments of absurdity. But I think last night was the first time I felt actual terror watching the show, and I wasn't sure if 'pushing it' this time meant pushing it too far. It didn't, but it was a strangely riveting hour of TV all the same." Jake Cole of Slant Magazine wrote, "The begrudging humanity of Louie, a result less of its protagonist's cynicism than his sheer laziness, is one of the show's key facets, and the pressure-cooker atmosphere of 'Elevator Part 1' forces it out of Louie without sentiment."

Joe Matar of Den of Geek gave the episode a 4.5 rating out of 5 and wrote, "This might be the weirdest episode of Season 4 so far. Perhaps that's a hard claim to make stick because there's nothing as obviously unreal as the garbage men from the premiere or the bizarre courtship between Louie and Blake in the second. But the weirdness here, I think, stems from the fact that the storylines in this episode feel terribly inconclusive. Again, maybe an odd argument to try and make. Louie is hardly known for neatly wrapping everything up every week. But still, the stories here come off a bit like random happenings that barely develop." Paste gave the episode a 6 out of 10 and wrote, "This episode will probably play better when connected with what comes afterwards, but as the first part of a serial, it wasn't terribly enticing."

==== Part 2 ====
"Elevator Part 2" received positive reviews from critics. Matt Fowler of IGN gave the episode a "great" 8 out of 10 and wrote in his verdict, ""Elevator Part 2" continued on with Louie's split-levels of life enjoyment. Both in the way the luminous Amia unburdened him of all forms of commitment (even communication) and how he had to deal with Jane's precocious misbehavior. Perhaps not realizing that a lot of her hang-ups come from him. As if she's actually somehow seen his stand up routine. We're not exactly in 'laugh out loud' Louie territory here, but it's still great, unassumingly wise TV."

Alan Sepinwall of HitFix wrote, "As we get further into the six-part saga that is 'Elevator,' it's now clear that the Jane prologue from Part 1 last week wasn't an isolated sketch, but part of this larger story of Louie struggling, as usual, to relate to all of the women in his life – where he's so screwed up that the one woman he can come close to understanding is the one with whom he doesn't share a common language." Erik Adams of The A.V. Club gave the episode a "B+" grade and wrote, "viewers can appreciate the way Louie's conversation with Janet in 'Elevator (Part 2)' mirrors the lessons in hearing vs. listening in the first of last week's episodes. It's far too easy to overpraise Louie but the impulse to do so exists because it sets the bar for itself so high, then clears that bar with so frequently."

Danielle Henderson of Vulture gave the episode a 3 star rating out of 5 and wrote, "The middle of this story arc is sort of about Louie's trouble with women, but more about reconciling how he feels about himself in relation to the women in his life. This is one of those episodes that sort of connects the dots about Louie's approach to life, and it definitely feels like a bridge to the final installment." Jake Cole of Slant Magazine wrote, "So far, this season of Louie has concentrated even more than normal on Louie's romantic prospects, and Amia gives the series yet another avenue to explore its protagonist's hang-ups."

Joe Matar of Den of Geek gave the episode a perfect 5 rating out of 5 and wrote, "'Elevator Part 2' was great! It's a solid little episode on its own and provides a good bit of development of two delightful storylines that I'm now definitely invested in." Paste gave the episode a 7.2 out of 10 and wrote, "'Elevator Part 2' also came out strong in the way it contrasted verbal communication with nonverbal—for instance, the food he offers as a gift at the beginning of the episode — not to mention how this plays with Louie's increasing problem with writing believable (or even existent) dialogue. Rather than conversations, Louie has become a show of monologues, primarily rants, whether it's on the date in 'So Did the Fat Lady' or his daughter on the bench or Louis speaking with his ex-wife about what to do with Jane."

==== Part 3 ====
"Elevator Part 3" received very positive reviews from critics. Matt Fowler of IGN gave the episode a "great" 8.5 out of 10 and wrote in his verdict, "Yes, Louie and Amia are destined to only be a temporary thing, but I think that when the time comes to part ways, Louie will be in a better place. Having the one happy part of his life jerked away from him sent him on a desperate, bent-knee spiral. One which, fortunately, didn't scare Amia away. 'Elevator Part 3' intensified their bond, while also showing us just how important Louie feels Amia is for his sanity at the moment."

Alan Sepinwall of HitFix wrote, "Though these are middle chapters of a bigger story, there is such emotion and care in these beats – and the way that C.K. films so many of the scenes in a single fluid take, which inserts you right into the scene so you can feel the awkwardness or anger or joy that Louie himself is feeling – that I'm more excited than ever to see where this is going." Erik Adams of The A.V. Club gave the episode an "A–" grade and wrote, "With no dialogue beyond the musical conversation between the two violinists, 'Elevator (Part 3)' offers a philosophical exchange on par with Dr. Bigelow's 'dog with three legs' koan. And at the end of each, all Louie can do is offer barely articulate approval. His 'Yaaay!' at the end of the violin duet is more childlike than anything Jane says all night."

Danielle Henderson of Vulture gave the episode a 4 star rating out of 5 and wrote, "The elevator arc ended on a weirdly optimistic note, using a three-legged dog as a metaphor for hope, a way for Louie to stop living in his head so much, but I doubt it will stick." Jake Cole of Slant Magazine wrote, "The modicum of self-respect that Louie shows in turning her down marks a display of maturity he doesn't show anywhere else in these two episodes, and as 'Elevator' continues to pile on its critiques of Louie's selfishness and destructively impulsive behavior, it will be interesting to see how well he sticks to his decision to stay with Amia."

Joe Matar of Den of Geek gave the episode a 4.5 rating out of 5 and wrote, "Overall, this story is getting more interesting and more complex with the reintroduction of Pamela. Louie continues to provide completely unique television as there aren't many dramedies out there that usually forego continuity but then suddenly stick a six-part miniseries in the mix as well as bring back a character from two seasons ago. I didn't find this episode as nicely contained as 'Elevator Part 2,' but it's another solid, sweet, sad, fun, episode that ends with a helpful Charles Grodin moral: 'Just pick a road and go down it. Or don't.'" Paste gave the episode a 7.2 out of 10 and wrote, "I was hoping that the long hiatus between seasons would bring us a newly revitalized Louie, full of more surprising surrealism and dark sensibility. Instead, most of what we've been given is a decent, but not extraordinary, romantic comedy."

==== Part 4 ====
"Elevator Part 4" received critical acclaim. Matt Fowler of IGN gave the episode an "amazing" 9 out of 10 and wrote in his verdict, "With a deeper investment and investigation into Louie's beginnings with Janet, 'Elevator Part 4' has turned this extended story into Louie's most personal one yet. Granted there were always parts of the show that felt directly lifted from his life, but this one really seemed to drive home the message of how adults unintentionally screw up their kids by both being dishonest about their own feelings and giving into their feelings too much. Basically, it's almost a no-win scenario."

Alan Sepinwall of HitFix wrote, "Given that Louis C.K. has already messed with our expectations and understanding of genetics by casting African-American actress Susan Kelechi Watson as Janet, I got a kick out of him then casting a Caucasian actress to play Janet in the flashback to the bad early days of their marriage. And the actor playing Young Louie absolutely nailed C.K.'s mannerisms and vocal delivery; even though he looks nothing like C.K., now or then, you understand that it's him." Emily St. James of The A.V. Club gave the episode an "A" grade and wrote, "As a film, 'Elevator' would be terrific. As television, it's grand. Nowhere is that more keenly expressed than in 'Elevator, Part 4,' the first of tonight's two episodes and a quick dive into the dissolution of Louie and Janet's marriage. Rather, that's what it seems to be pushing toward."

Danielle Henderson of Vulture gave the episode a 4 star rating out of 5 and wrote, "Louis C.K. seems to be giving us a movie. These 'Elevator' episodes are a well-crafted way to float in and out of Louie's world with some depth while still sort of keeping us at arm's length; it all feels a little fantastic, but it's a sustainable story." Jake Cole of Slant Magazine wrote, "The first is a flashback of a young Louie and Janet discussing the prospect of divorce barely two years into their marriage, culminating in brief but mutually orgasmic breakup sex and Louie ironically wondering what would happen if she got pregnant from it."

Joe Matar of Den of Geek gave the episode a 4.5 rating out of 5 and wrote, "So, apparently, between this flashback and now, Janet changed into a black woman. Considering the guy playing young Louie looks not entirely unlike the real Louie, maybe C.K. is putting in some kind of message here about how Janet has changed but Louie didn't or something...? But, come on, let's be frank here: it's confusing. But, hey, another great episode of a weird-ass show." Paste gave the episode a 7.4 out of 10 and wrote, "This segment managed something Season Four has consistently had trouble with, walking the tightrope of dealing with the real issue of where Jane is supposed to go to school and both treating it seriously and finding some modicum of humor. Instead of the tone deafness we saw earlier, here there's black humor as Louis literally screams outside during the middle of their therapy session, yet things continue onwards."

==== Part 5 ====
"Elevator Part 5" received very positive reviews from critics. Matt Fowler of IGN gave the episode a "great" 8.8 out of 10 and wrote in his verdict, "I suppose Louie should have known better than to try and make a good thing better. Especially when he's someone who's way more comfortable with occasionally brushes with happiness, and not a person who can deal with it on a large, lengthy scale. And it's fun to try and decide whether or not he slept with Amia to try and convince her to stay or if he did it simply to prove to Evanka, and the universe, that what he and Amia had was "serious." Albeit doomed. Either way, it ended badly for him. And as we head into the final chapter of this tale, I kind of hope to find out that Amia's disapproval wasn't directly because of Louie's inadequacies. Though, that may be the funnier route, for sure."

Alan Sepinwall of HitFix wrote, "Given how much time has been spent on this arc already, I'm not only interested in seeing what comes in next week's conclusion, but in seeing how the start of the next story arc is able to function on the same night as this one's end." Emily St. James of The A.V. Club gave the episode an "A–" grade and wrote, "Though I've rattled on about 'Elevator, Part 4' the most here, there's more than enough going on in 'Part 5' to recommend it as well. I suspect the long vignette with Barry talking about his day will prove at least somewhat controversial, but I like the way that it ends with rapturous applause over the idea of Barry victoriously getting the manager of a club in Poughkeepsie to spell his name correctly on a dressing room sign."

Danielle Henderson of Vulture gave the episode a 4 star rating out of 5 and wrote, "The Jim Norton and Amia scene made me smile; I like that she was able to lay waste to him and spark his insecurity using only her tone of voice." Jake Cole of Slant Magazine wrote, "Louie, like the comic who makes it, can occasionally reveal blind spots in the protagonist's self-criticism that expose how he wields it as defense, not honest evaluation. The deeper the show gets into 'Elevator,' the more it emerges as the least pedantic yet most probing assessment of Louie's hang-ups and failures as a human being, untethered to the self-deprecation that he relies on for absolution."

Joe Matar of Den of Geek gave the episode a 3.5 rating out of 5 and wrote, "I can't be too mad at an episode with an awesome Todd Barry monologue, but I do wonder if all this Barry came at the loss of furthering the plot of Louie's troubles with his daughter Jane and ex-wife, Janet." Paste gave the episode a 7.2 out of 10 and wrote, "Louis C.K. as creator seems to believe that he's just as good at creating compelling drama as he is at surreal comedy. Unfortunately, he isn't, and the continuation of these storylines hasn't done much to improve their content. Instead, it's made ideas that felt unfit to take up the focus of one episode expand over much of the entire season."

==== Part 6 ====
"Elevator Part 6" received mostly positive reviews from critics. Matt Fowler of IGN gave the episode a "great" 8.3 out of 10 and wrote in his verdict, "The six-part Elevator series was an interesting deviation from the Louie norm. Not that it was without trademark Louie-isms, but the this [sic] long-form type of tragicomedy really does reflect how this series really is "Louie doing whatever he wants to do." Even if it means not providing his audience with the type of f***ed up stories they've grown accustomed to. Overall, the tale was rewarding and touching, though I won't call it "genius.""

Alan Sepinwall of HitFix wrote, "Because the bulk of this season has been telling one big story, it's tougher to come up with judgments on individual segments of it – even the alleged conclusion to a six-parter like 'Elevator Part 6.'" Erik Adams of The A.V. Club gave the episode an "A" grade and wrote, "The primary conflict of 'Elevator (Part 6)' is one of an epic sweep vs. an emotional finale. The episode contains some of the most technically challenging camera work of this or any other season of Louie, but it takes nothing more than a stationary shot to capture all of the joy, anguish, love, frustration, beauty, honesty, and gratitude that exists between Louie and Amia."

Danielle Henderson of Vulture gave the episode a 3 star rating out of 5 and wrote, "I liked the Elevator Series; it felt dreamy and absurd, but totally romantic and strange, all at once. Louie's dating life is better writ large." Jake Cole of Slant Magazine wrote, "Taken collectively, 'Elevator,' with its symbolic storm imagery, neurotic protagonist, and thoughtful consideration of the choice of remaining alone or risking heartbreak for even a few weeks of companionship, stands as one of the finest rom-coms of the last decade, able to combine the genre's sweetness, outsized absurdity, and anti-romantic deconstruction into a cohesive whole."

Joe Matar of Den of Geek gave the episode a perfect 5 rating out of 5 and wrote, "Basically, even if I had misgivings about 'Elevator Part 6.' The end of the episode made me well up in a way Louie hasn't done since Pamela took off for Paris back in Season 2. It was sweet, sad, charming, and even has a funny line from Louie in the middle of it all." Paste gave the episode a 6.9 out of 10 and wrote, "'Elevator Part 6' turns the show into a disaster movie, but the motivation for this strange turn of events is that perfectly named device: the pathetic fallacy. It offers us a pretty poor metaphor for what's going on in the narrative."

=== Accolades ===
For "Elevator Part 6", Louis C.K. was nominated for Outstanding Directing for a Comedy Series at the 66th Primetime Emmy Awards. He would lose the award to Modern Family for the episode "Las Vegas".
