= Benidorm Bastards =

Belgian comedy television series

- Genre: Comedy
- Created by: Tim Van Aelst
- Theme music composer: Pascal Deweze; Tim Vanhamel
- Country of origin: Belgium
- Original language: Dutch
- No. of seasons: 2
- No. of episodes: 30+

Production
- Producer: Shelter

Original release
- Network: 2BE
- Release: 2010 – 2011

Benidorm Bastards is a Belgian comedy television series.

== Format ==
Benidorm Bastards is a Belgian hidden camera comedy programme on the Flemish TV channel 2BE. All characters are amateur actors and senior citizens. The programme has a similar concept to Trigger Happy TV, a Belgian version of which was broadcast on the same channel. In October 2010, a second season started on 2BE. In the program old actors try to act as if they were young talking about things no older person would dare to talk about. They also have funny situations like out-of-control electric wheelchairs and other funny happenings which seem strange to young people.

=== Awards ===
- In September 2010, the programme won the Rose d'Or in Lucerne in the category "comedy", and also "best of 2010."
- In November 2011 the series won an International Emmy Award in the category "comedy."

=== Criticism ===
The mayor of the Spanish town of Benidorm does not approve of the programme's title Benidorm Bastards. He demands that "Benidorm" be removed from the title because the term "bastard" created "a negative projection" that damaged its image. The name Benidorm is used because many Belgian and Dutch seniors move to Benidorm after retirement.

== International broadcasts ==
Episodes of the original Belgian version of the show air in the Netherlands (RTL4, December 2013), in Australia on SBS2 in Dutch with English subtitles, India as Benidorm Pranksters with English dubbing and on ATV Home's RTHK programming block with Cantonese dubbing.

== International versions ==
A Dutch version of the show, announced on 15 April 2010, is broadcast by RTL 4 since 21 August 2010, recast with Dutch actors. From 17 March 2018 6 episodes of Benidorm bastards & de boefjes have been broadcast. In this series not only seniors, but also children are pranking with adults.

The United States network NBC announced it would be creating an American adaptation, Betty White's Off Their Rockers, starring Betty White. The show debuted on January 16, 2012, one day before White's 90th birthday.

The show has adaptions in all Scandinavian countries as well. The Danish version is Rollatorbanden, the Norwegian version is Bingobanden and the Swedish version is Pensionärsjävlar.

In the United Kingdom, ITV announced its own adaptation of the show. Following the American adaptation it was also entitled Off Their Rockers but with different characters. The first episode aired April 7, 2013.

The Turkish version Baston Takımı airs on Star TV.

The Brazilian version Os Velhinhos Se Divertem airs on SBT inside the oldest Brazilian show called Programa Silvio Santos.

The Spanish version, Los mayores gamberros, premiered on 13 September 2013 on Antena 3.

The Canada version, Les détestables, premiered in 2011 on V.

The Italian version, Vecchi Bastardi, premiered on April 7, 2014, in the afternoon on Italia 1 and ceased to be aired on 6 June 2014 (44 episodes of Italian made candid cameras mixed with international ones imported from United States, Holland, Australia, United Kingdom, Belgium and Spain).

The Estonia version of the show, Eesti Ulakad Vanurid, started broadcasting on 19 May 2016 on TV3.
