= 66th Primetime Emmy Awards =

2014 American television programming awards

- Promotional poster
- Date: August 25, 2014 (Ceremony); August 16, 2014 (Creative Arts Awards)
- Location: Nokia Theatre, Los Angeles, California
- Presented by: Academy of Television Arts and Sciences
- Hosted by: Seth Meyers

Highlights
- Most awards: Major: Breaking Bad (5); All: Sherlock: His Last Vow (7)
- Most nominations: The Normal Heart (9)
- Outstanding Comedy Series: Modern Family
- Outstanding Drama Series: Breaking Bad
- Outstanding Miniseries: Fargo
- Outstanding Competition Program: The Amazing Race
- Outstanding Variety Series: The Colbert Report
- Website: http://www.emmys.com/

Television/radio coverage
- Network: NBC
- Produced by: Don Mischer
- Directed by: Glenn Weiss

The 66th Primetime Emmy Awards honored the best in American prime time television programming from June 1, 2013, until May 31, 2014, as chosen by the Academy of Television Arts & Sciences. The ceremony was held on Monday, August 25, 2014, at the Nokia Theatre in Downtown Los Angeles, California, where 26 awards were presented, and was broadcast in the U.S. by NBC. Comedian and NBC's Late Night host Seth Meyers hosted the ceremony for the first time. The nominations were announced on July 10, 2014.

The scheduling of the Primetime Emmy Awards is coordinated with that of the Creative Arts Emmy Awards ceremony, which was held the previous weekend on August 16, 2014.

Breaking Bad was the major winner of the night, with five wins, including its second Primetime Emmy Award for Outstanding Drama Series for the second part of its fifth season. Modern Family won its fifth consecutive Primetime Emmy Award for Outstanding Comedy Series, tying with Frasier as the series with the most consecutive wins in the category. Gail Mancuso became the first woman in the history of the Primetime Emmy Awards to win the Outstanding Directing Emmy twice after her win for directing the Modern Family episode "Las Vegas". The Amazing Race won its tenth Primetime Emmy Award for Outstanding Reality-Competition Program as well. Other major winners of the night were Sherlock: His Last Vow (3 wins), American Horror Story: Coven and Fargo (2 wins each).

== Scheduling of ceremony ==
"This year we're doing the Emmys on a Monday night in August, which if I understand television, means the Emmys are about to be canceled."

— host Seth Meyers, during his opening monologue

The ceremony was held on a night other than Sunday for the first time since 1976 (the 28th Primetime Emmy Awards were also staged on a Monday that year, May 17). The ceremony's unusual date – a Monday night in late August – was due to two factors, primary being NBC's commitment to Sunday Night Football; since acquiring the National Football League's Sunday night game package in 2006, NBC, when it is their turn in the four-network rotation to air the Primetime Emmy Awards, usually schedules the ceremony for the Sunday before Labor Day weekend, to avoid conflicts with SNF in mid-September (when ABC, CBS or Fox normally air the ceremony). (Note: The last time a ceremony had to be scheduled around football was the 62nd Primetime Emmy Awards, which NBC aired on Sunday, August 29, 2010.) NBC's ideal date on the 2014 calendar for the ceremony (Sunday, August 24) led to the other scheduling factor — MTV's Video Music Awards, which were set for that night more than a year in advance (and would be staged in the L.A. area as well, at The Forum in Inglewood). On January 28, 2014, rather than go head-to-head with the VMA's, NBC announced that the ceremony would take place on Monday, August 25. The move would allow NBC to commit to a preseason Sunday Night Football broadcast for the 24th (a game between the Cincinnati Bengals and Arizona Cardinals); it also ensured the tradition of staging the Primetime Emmy Awards the weekend after the Creative Arts Emmy Awards (that ceremony was already set for August 16).

The ceremony's weeknight date and start time – 5:00 p.m. (PDT) in Los Angeles, California – led to concerns of rush hour traffic gridlock in Los Angeles' downtown core at the time of the ceremony; to help alleviate the concerns, the ATAS worked with Los Angeles city officials to map out street closures and red carpet staging areas, as well as include travel instructions (including which routes to take and where to park) in attendees' ticket packets.

== Changes in categories and balloting ==
On November 14, 2013, the Academy of Television Arts & Sciences announced that it would implement online voting for its members to select the nominees. However, online voting to determine the winners would not be used until 2015, and winners for this year were voted on via paper ballots.

The Academy had also announced changes to several awards and categories that affect both the Primetime and Creative Arts Emmy Awards. Changes for the Primetime Emmy Awards involved separating the Outstanding Miniseries or Movie category into two entities again—Outstanding Miniseries and Outstanding Television Movie. The two were combined in 2011, due to a downtrend in the genres. This separation is only for the program category with all other awards in the category remaining combined between the two formats. The Academy also introduced two new categories—Outstanding Structured Reality Program and Outstanding Unstructured Reality Program. (Note: Reality television programs are honored in three categories: "Outstanding Reality-Competition Program", "Outstanding Structured Reality Program", and "Outstanding Unstructured Reality Program"; the last two are awarded at the 66th Primetime Creative Arts Emmy Awards.)

There was also an increase in the number of longform nominees in writing, directing and performing categories for miniseries/movie (from five to six nominees) as well as a change in their final voting procedures. Additionally, a 2% rule was adopted in the comedy and drama series categories, wherein, a seventh nominee can be added to the respective categories if its total first-round votes are within 2% of the sixth place series.

== Winners and nominees ==
Winners are listed first and highlighted in bold:

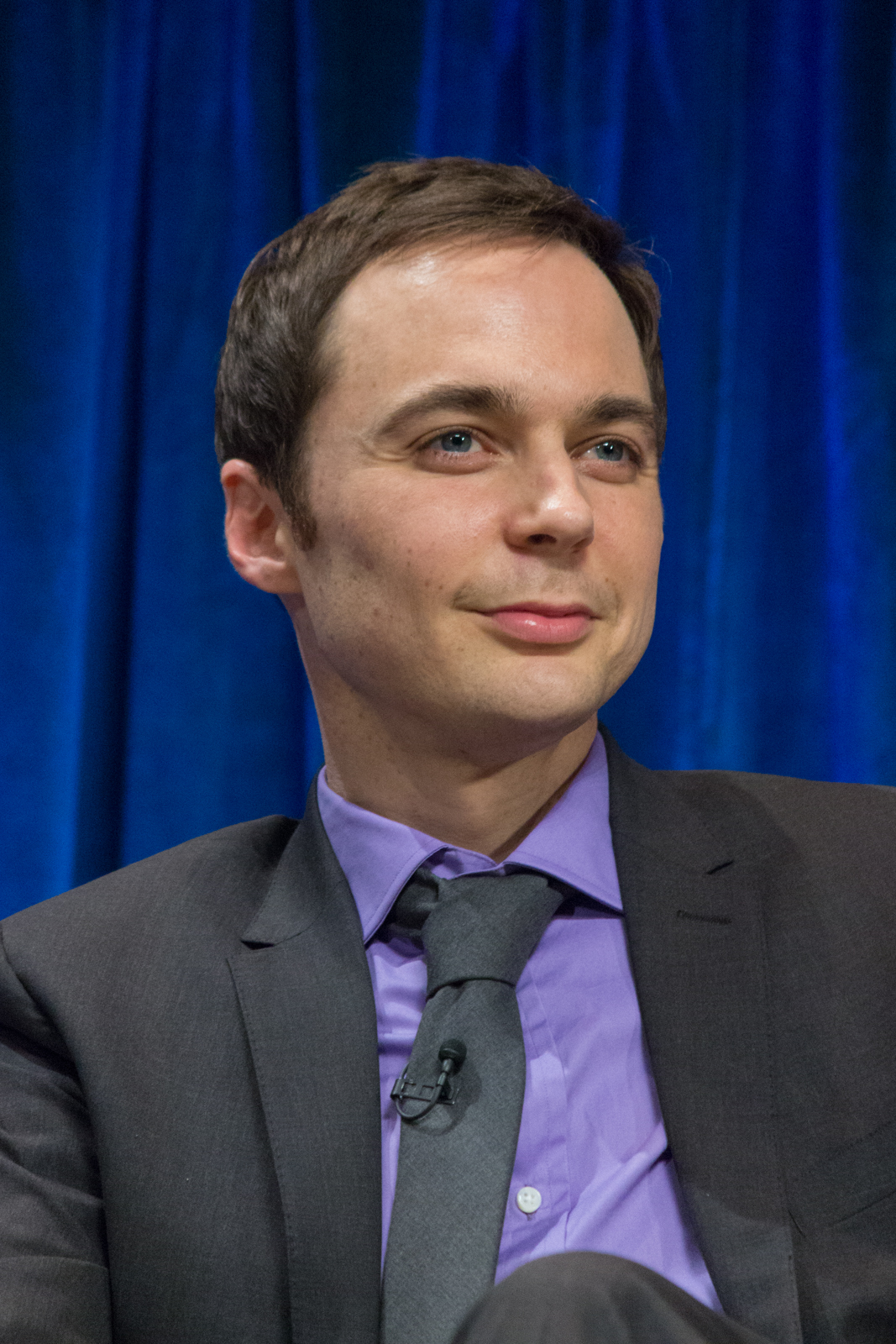
Jim Parsons, Outstanding Lead Actor in a Comedy Series winner

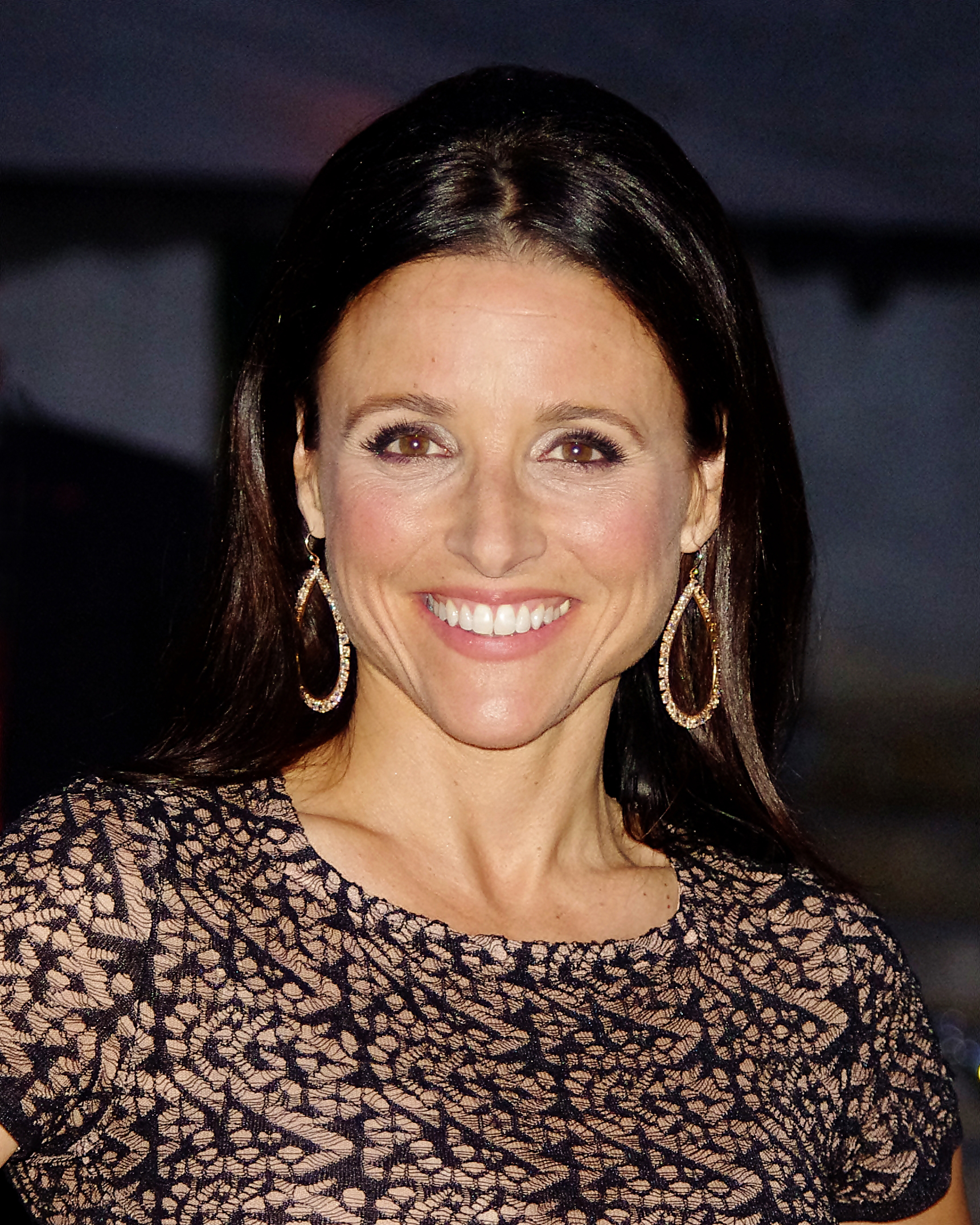
Julia Louis-Dreyfus, Outstanding Lead Actress in a Comedy Series winner

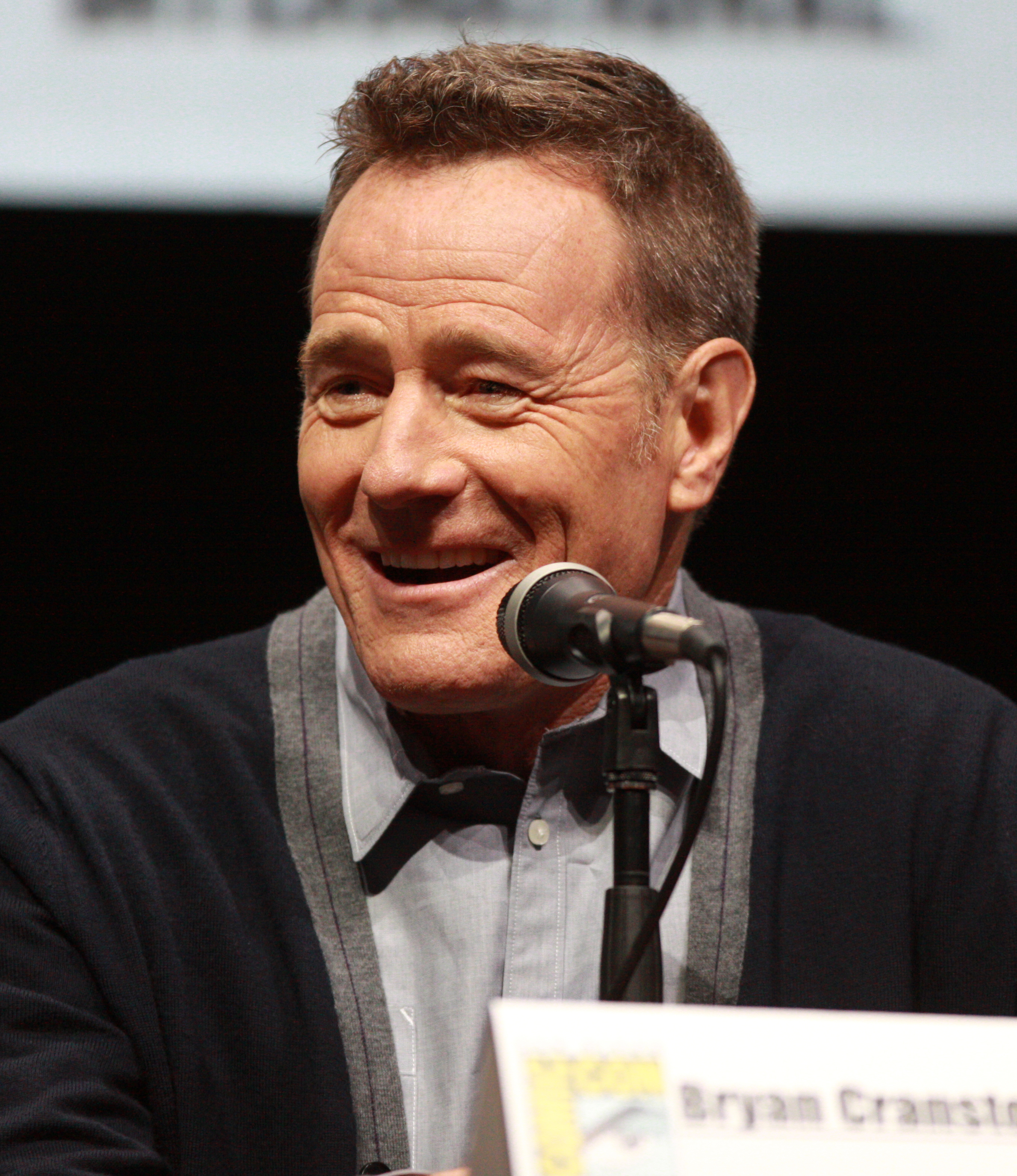
Bryan Cranston, Outstanding Lead Actor in a Drama Series winner

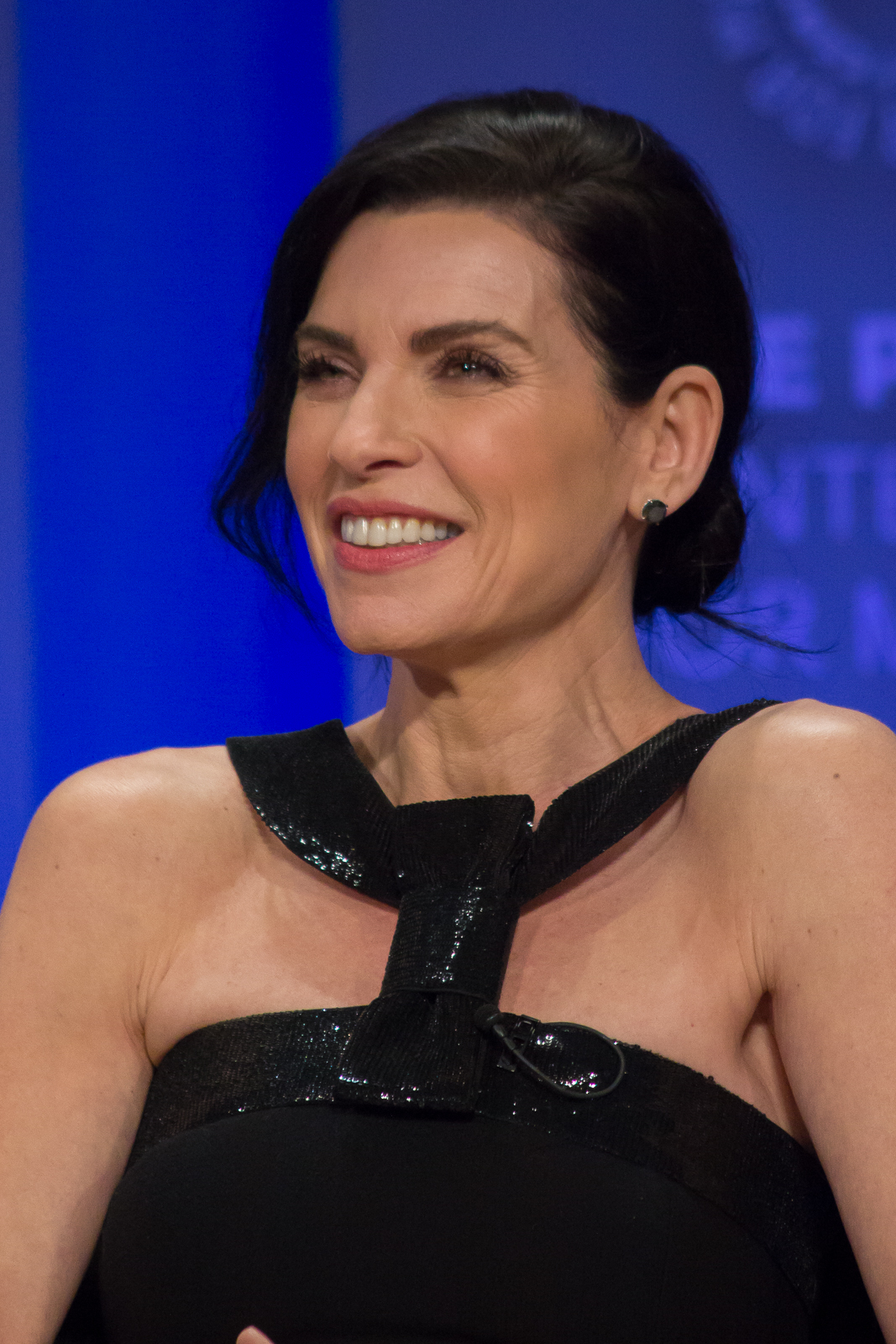
Julianna Margulies, Outstanding Lead Actress in a Drama Series winner

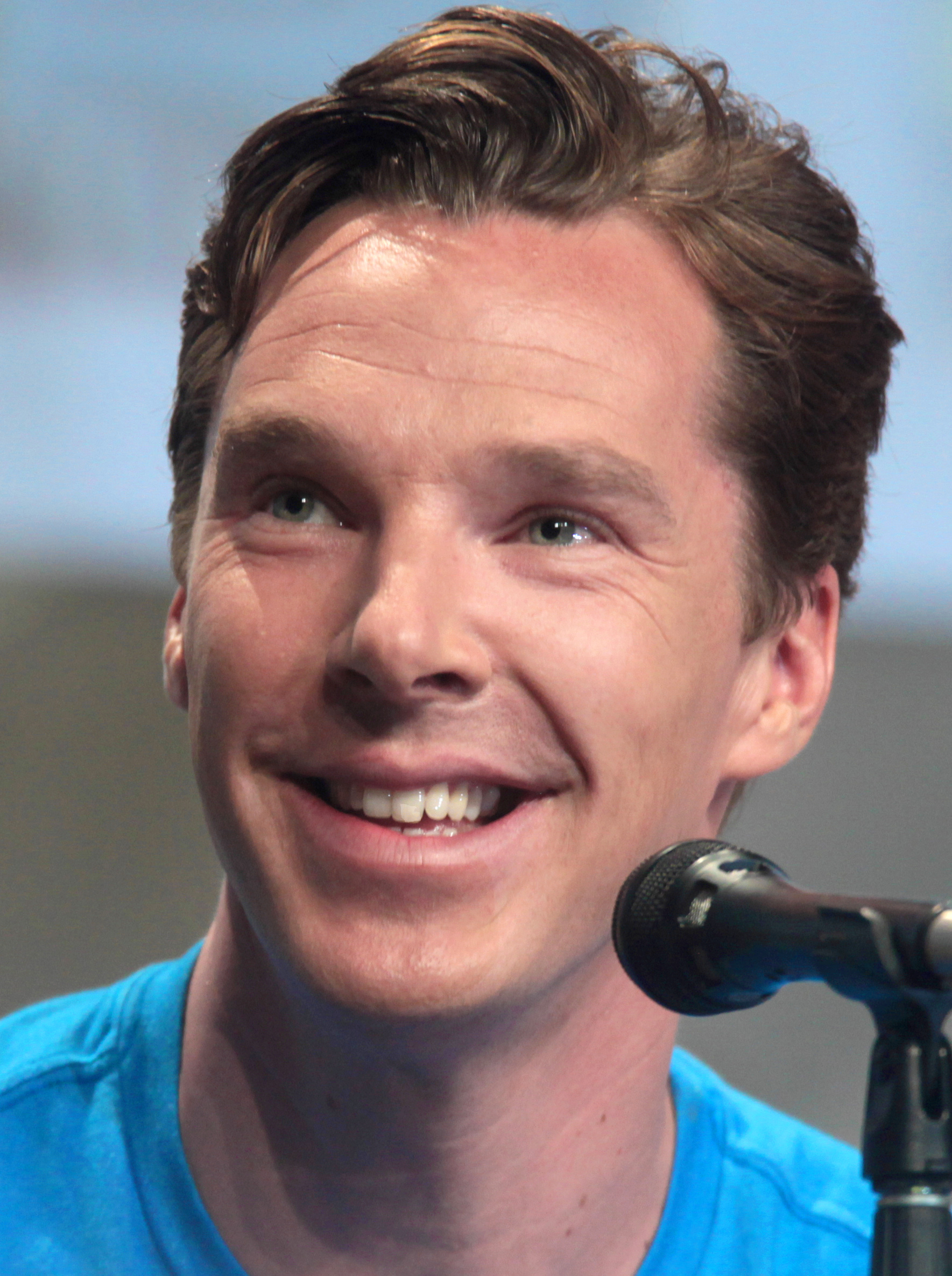
Benedict Cumberbatch, Outstanding Lead Actor in a Miniseries or Movie winner

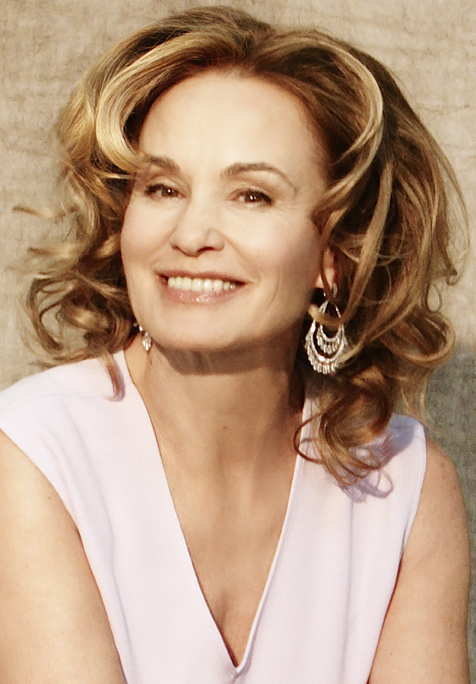
Jessica Lange, Outstanding Lead Actress in a Miniseries or Movie winner

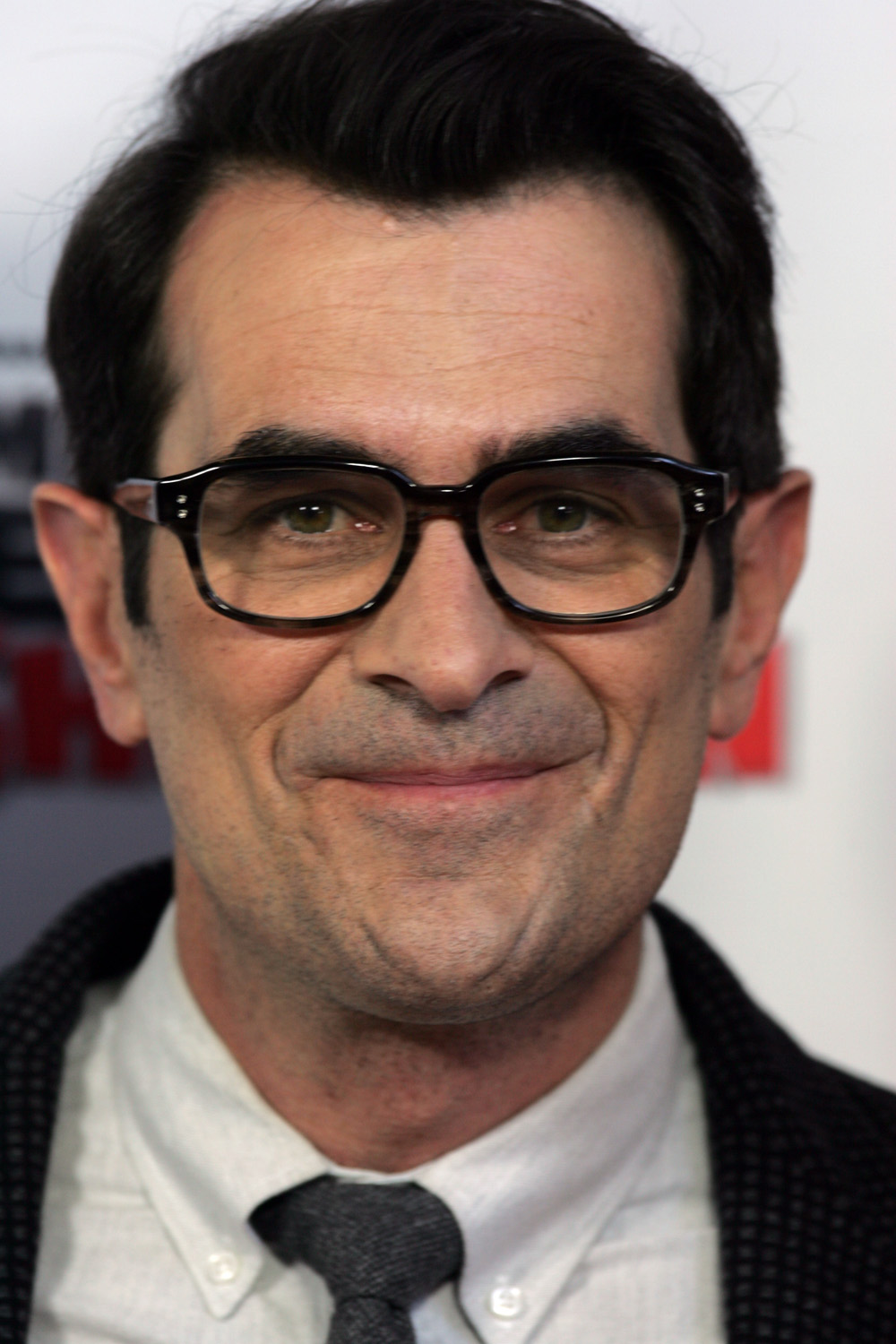
Ty Burrell, Outstanding Supporting Actor in a Comedy Series winner

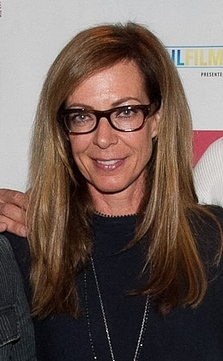
Allison Janney, Outstanding Supporting Actress in a Comedy Series winner

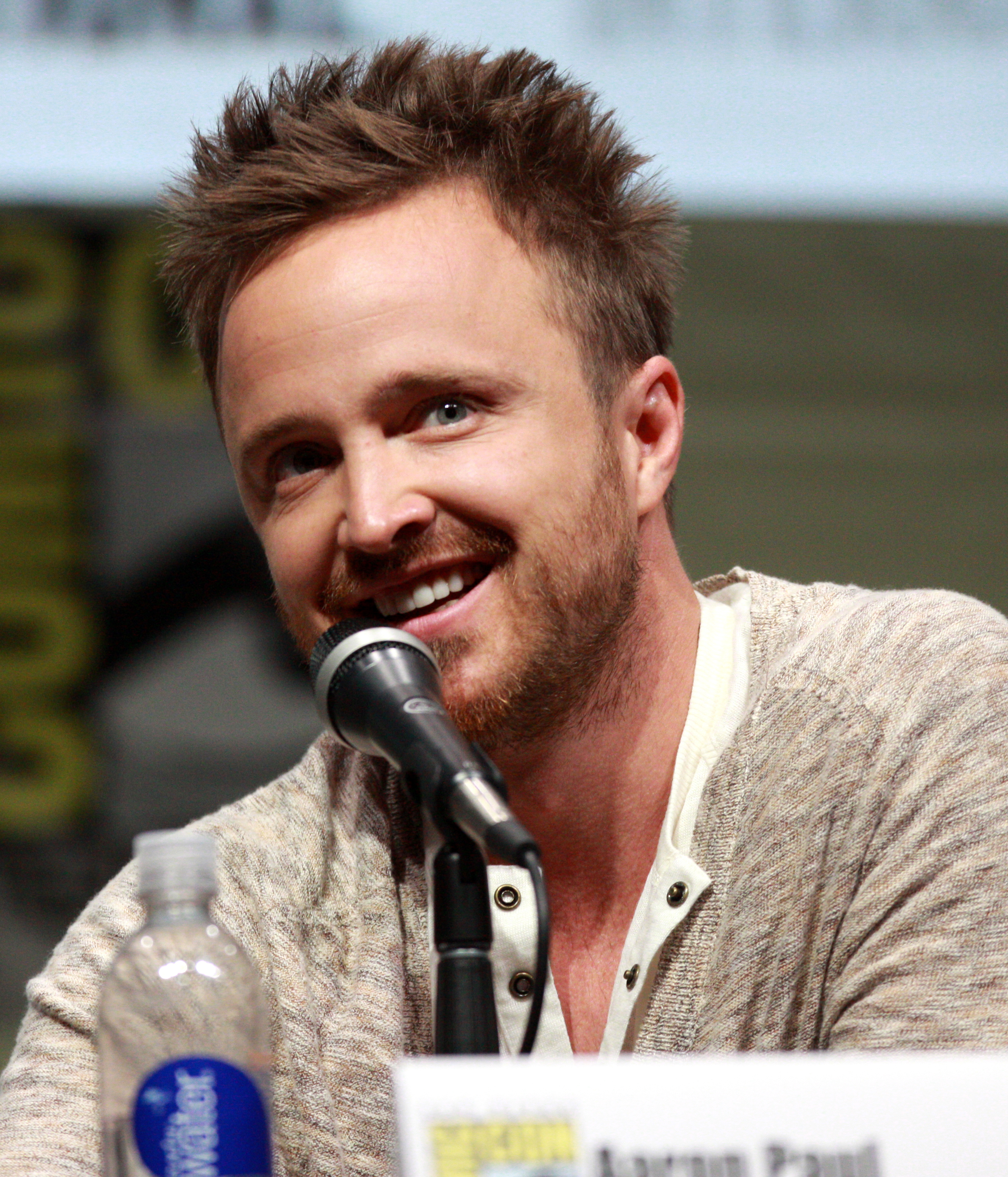
Aaron Paul, Outstanding Supporting Actor in a Drama Series winner

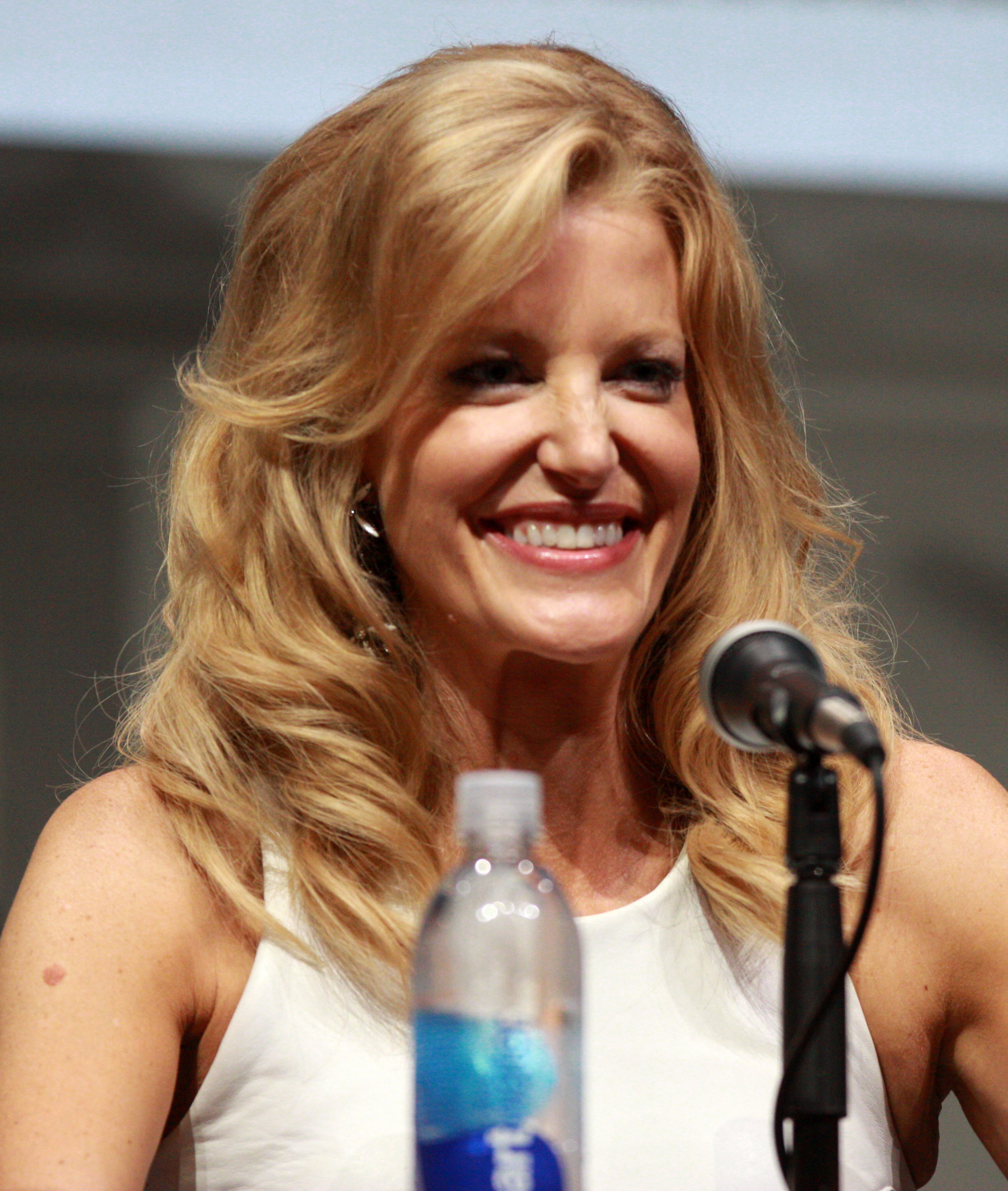
Anna Gunn, Outstanding Supporting Actress in a Drama Series winner

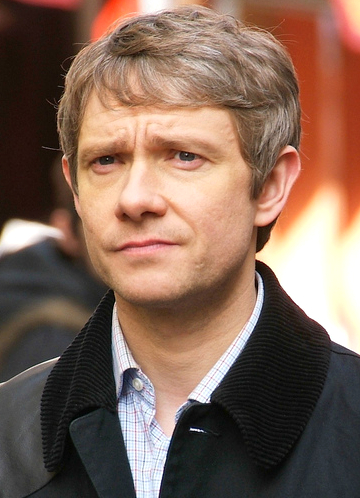
Martin Freeman, Outstanding Supporting Actor in a Miniseries or Movie winner

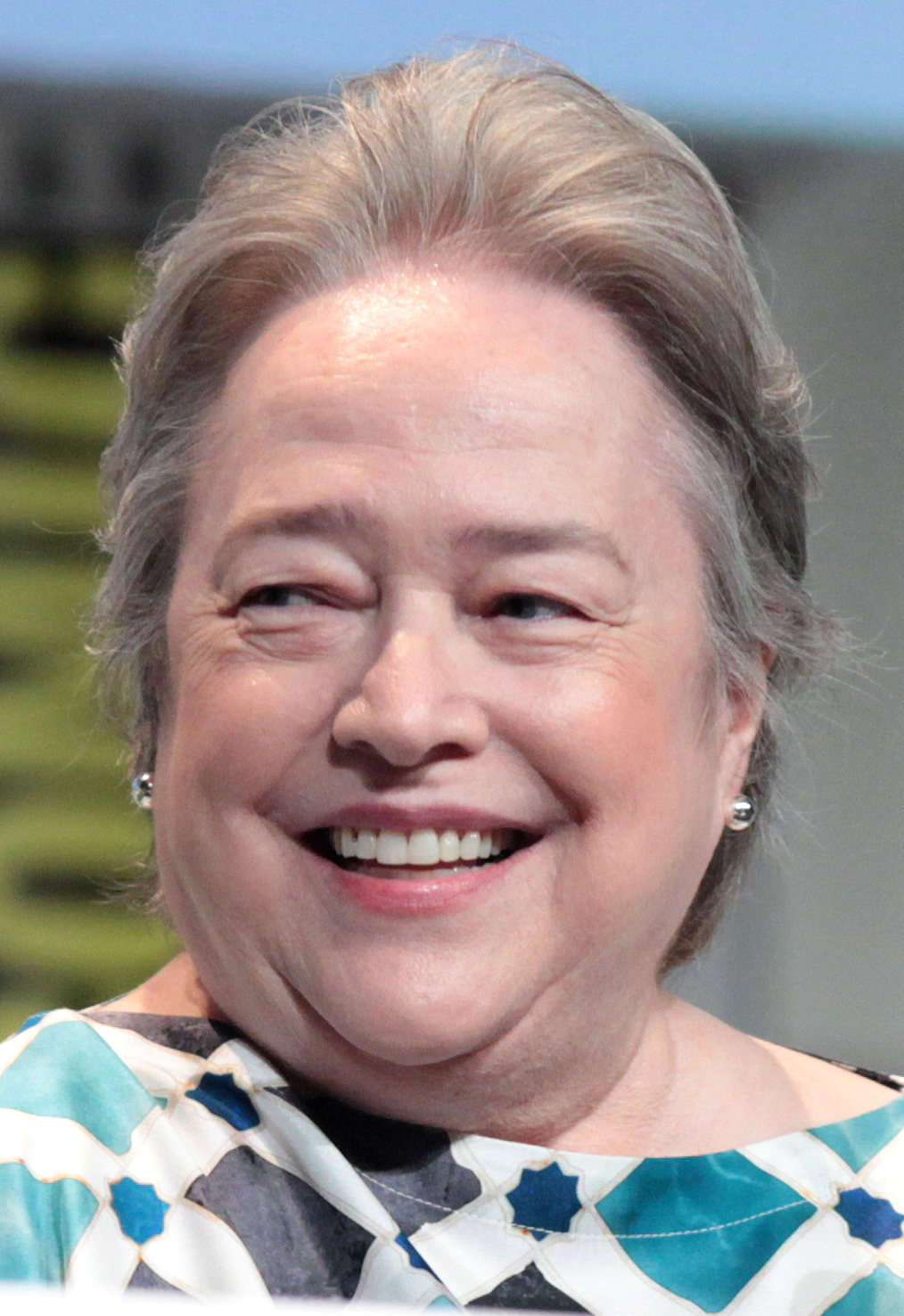
Kathy Bates, Outstanding Supporting Actress in a Miniseries or Movie winner

=== Programs ===
Programs
**Outstanding Comedy Series**: **Modern Family (ABC)**; The Big Bang Theory (CBS); Louie (FX); Orange Is the New Black (Netflix); Silicon Valley (HBO); Veep (HBO)	**Outstanding Drama Series**: **Breaking Bad (AMC)**; Downton Abbey (PBS); Game of Thrones (HBO); House of Cards (Netflix); Mad Men (AMC); True Detective (HBO)
**Outstanding Variety Series**: **The Colbert Report (Comedy Central)**; The Daily Show with Jon Stewart (Comedy Central); Jimmy Kimmel Live! (ABC); Real Time with Bill Maher (HBO); Saturday Night Live (NBC); The Tonight Show Starring Jimmy Fallon (NBC)	**Outstanding Miniseries**: **Fargo (FX)**; American Horror Story: Coven (FX); Bonnie & Clyde (A&E); Luther (BBC America); Treme (HBO); The White Queen (Starz)
**Outstanding Television Movie**: **The Normal Heart (HBO)**; Killing Kennedy (Nat Geo); Muhammad Ali's Greatest Fight (HBO); Sherlock: His Last Vow (PBS); The Trip to Bountiful (Lifetime)	**Outstanding Reality-Competition Program**: **The Amazing Race (CBS)**; Dancing with the Stars (ABC); Project Runway (Lifetime); So You Think You Can Dance (Fox); Top Chef (Bravo); The Voice (NBC)

=== Acting ===
==== Lead ====
Lead performances
**Outstanding Lead Actor in a Comedy Series**: **Jim Parsons – The Big Bang Theory as Dr. Sheldon Cooper (CBS)**; Louis C.K. – Louie as Louie (FX); Don Cheadle – House of Lies as Marty Kaan (Showtime); Ricky Gervais – Derek as Derek Noakes (Netflix); Matt LeBlanc – Episodes as himself (Showtime); William H. Macy – Shameless as Frank Gallagher (Showtime)	**Outstanding Lead Actress in a Comedy Series**: **Julia Louis-Dreyfus – Veep as Vice President Selina Meyer (HBO)**; Lena Dunham – Girls as Hannah Horvath (HBO); Edie Falco – Nurse Jackie as Jackie Peyton, RN (Showtime); Melissa McCarthy – Mike & Molly as Molly Flynn (CBS); Amy Poehler – Parks and Recreation as Leslie Knope (NBC); Taylor Schilling – Orange Is the New Black as Piper Chapman (Netflix)
**Outstanding Lead Actor in a Drama Series**: **Bryan Cranston – Breaking Bad as Walter White (AMC)**; Jeff Daniels – The Newsroom as Will McAvoy (HBO); Jon Hamm – Mad Men as Don Draper (AMC); Woody Harrelson – True Detective as Detective Martin Hart (HBO); Matthew McConaughey – True Detective as Detective Rustin "Rust" Cohle (HBO); Kevin Spacey – House of Cards as Frank Underwood (Netflix)	**Outstanding Lead Actress in a Drama Series**: **Julianna Margulies – The Good Wife as Alicia Florrick (CBS)**; Lizzy Caplan – Masters of Sex as Virginia Johnson (Showtime); Claire Danes – Homeland as Carrie Mathison (Showtime); Michelle Dockery – Downton Abbey as Lady Mary Crawley (PBS); Kerry Washington – Scandal as Olivia Pope (ABC); Robin Wright – House of Cards as Second Lady Claire Underwood (Netflix)
**Outstanding Lead Actor in a Miniseries or Movie**: **Benedict Cumberbatch – Sherlock: His Last Vow as Sherlock Holmes (PBS)**; Chiwetel Ejiofor – Dancing on the Edge as Louis Lester (Starz); Idris Elba – Luther as DCI John Luther (BBC America); Martin Freeman – Fargo as Lester Nygaard (FX); Mark Ruffalo – The Normal Heart as Ned Weeks (HBO); Billy Bob Thornton – Fargo as Lorne Malvo (FX)	**Outstanding Lead Actress in a Miniseries or Movie**: **Jessica Lange – American Horror Story: Coven as Fiona Goode (FX)**; Helena Bonham Carter – Burton & Taylor as Elizabeth Taylor (BBC America); Minnie Driver – Return to Zero as Maggie Royal (Lifetime); Sarah Paulson – American Horror Story: Coven as Cordelia Foxx (FX); Cicely Tyson – The Trip to Bountiful as Mrs. Carrie Watts (Lifetime); Kristen Wiig – The Spoils of Babylon as Cynthia Morehouse (IFC)

==== Supporting ====
Supporting performances
**Outstanding Supporting Actor in a Comedy Series**: **Ty Burrell – Modern Family as Phil Dunphy (ABC)**; Fred Armisen – Portlandia as various characters (IFC); Andre Braugher – Brooklyn Nine-Nine as Captain Ray Holt (Fox); Adam Driver – Girls as Adam Sackler (HBO); Jesse Tyler Ferguson – Modern Family as Mitchell Pritchett (ABC); Tony Hale – Veep as Gary Walsh (HBO)	**Outstanding Supporting Actress in a Comedy Series**: **Allison Janney – Mom as Bonnie Plunkett (CBS)**; Mayim Bialik – The Big Bang Theory as Dr. Amy Farrah Fowler (CBS); Julie Bowen – Modern Family as Claire Dunphy (ABC); Anna Chlumsky – Veep as Amy Brookheimer (HBO); Kate McKinnon – Saturday Night Live as various characters (NBC); Kate Mulgrew – Orange Is the New Black as Galina "Red" Reznikov (Netflix)
**Outstanding Supporting Actor in a Drama Series**: **Aaron Paul – Breaking Bad as Jesse Pinkman (AMC)**; Jim Carter – Downton Abbey as Charles Carson (PBS); Josh Charles – The Good Wife as Will Gardner (CBS); Peter Dinklage – Game of Thrones as Tyrion Lannister (HBO); Mandy Patinkin – Homeland as Saul Berenson (Showtime); Jon Voight – Ray Donovan as Mickey Donovan (Showtime)	**Outstanding Supporting Actress in a Drama Series**: **Anna Gunn – Breaking Bad as Skyler White (AMC)**; Christine Baranski – The Good Wife as Diane Lockhart (CBS); Joanne Froggatt – Downton Abbey as Anna Bates (PBS); Lena Headey – Game of Thrones as Cersei Lannister (HBO); Christina Hendricks – Mad Men as Joan Harris (AMC); Maggie Smith – Downton Abbey as Violet Crawley, Dowager Countess of Grantham (PBS)
**Outstanding Supporting Actor in a Miniseries or Movie**: **Martin Freeman – Sherlock: His Last Vow as Dr. John Watson (PBS)**; Matt Bomer – The Normal Heart as Felix Turner (HBO); Colin Hanks – Fargo as Officer Gus Grimly (FX); Joe Mantello – The Normal Heart as Mickey Marcus (HBO); Alfred Molina – The Normal Heart as Ben Weeks (HBO); Jim Parsons – The Normal Heart as Tommy Boatwright (HBO)	**Outstanding Supporting Actress in a Miniseries or Movie**: **Kathy Bates – American Horror Story: Coven as Delphine LaLaurie (FX)**; Angela Bassett – American Horror Story: Coven as Marie Laveau (FX); Ellen Burstyn – Flowers in the Attic as Olivia Foxworth (Lifetime); Frances Conroy – American Horror Story: Coven as Myrtle Snow (FX); Julia Roberts – The Normal Heart as Dr. Emma Brookner (HBO); Allison Tolman – Fargo as Deputy Molly Solverson (FX)

=== Directing ===
Directing
**Outstanding Directing for a Comedy Series**: **Modern Family: "Las Vegas" – Gail Mancuso (ABC)**; Episodes: "Episode Nine" – Iain B. MacDonald (Showtime); Glee: "100" – Paris Barclay (Fox); Louie: "Elevator, Part 6" – Louis C.K. (FX); Orange Is the New Black: "Lesbian Request Denied" – Jodie Foster (Netflix); Silicon Valley: "Minimum Viable Product" – Mike Judge (HBO)	**Outstanding Directing for a Drama Series**: **True Detective: "Who Goes There" – Cary Joji Fukunaga (HBO)**; Boardwalk Empire: "Farewell Daddy Blues" – Tim Van Patten (HBO); Breaking Bad: "Felina" – Vince Gilligan (AMC); Downton Abbey: "Episode One" – David Evans (PBS); Game of Thrones: "The Watchers on the Wall" – Neil Marshall (HBO); House of Cards: "Chapter 14" – Carl Franklin (Netflix)
**Outstanding Directing for a Variety Special**: **67th Tony Awards – Glenn Weiss (CBS)**; 86th Academy Awards – Hamish Hamilton (ABC); The Beatles: The Night That Changed America – Gregg Gelfand (CBS); Kennedy Center Honors – Louis J. Horvitz (CBS); Six by Sondheim – James Lapine (HBO); The Sound of Music Live! – Beth McCarthy-Miller and Rob Ashford (NBC)	**Outstanding Directing for a Miniseries, Movie or Dramatic Special**: **Fargo: "Buridan's Ass" – Colin Bucksey (FX)**; American Horror Story: Coven: "Bitchcraft" – Alfonso Gomez-Rejon (FX); Fargo: "The Crocodile's Dilemma" – Adam Bernstein (FX); Muhammad Ali's Greatest Fight – Stephen Frears (HBO); The Normal Heart – Ryan Murphy (HBO); Sherlock: His Last Vow – Nick Hurran (PBS)

=== Writing ===
Writing
**Outstanding Writing for a Comedy Series**: **Louie: "So Did the Fat Lady" – Louis C.K. (FX)**; Episodes: "Episode Five" – David Crane and Jeffrey Klarik (Showtime); Orange Is the New Black: "I Wasn't Ready" – Liz Friedman and Jenji Kohan (Netflix); Silicon Valley: "Optimal Tip-to-Tip Efficiency" – Alec Berg (HBO); Veep: "Special Relationship" – Simon Blackwell, Armando Iannucci, and Tony Roche (HBO)	**Outstanding Writing for a Drama Series**: **Breaking Bad: "Ozymandias" – Moira Walley-Beckett (AMC)**; Breaking Bad: "Felina" – Vince Gilligan (AMC); Game of Thrones: "The Children" David Benioff and D. B. Weiss (HBO); House of Cards: "Chapter 14" – Beau Willimon (Netflix); True Detective: "The Secret Fate of All Life" – Nic Pizzolatto (HBO)
**Outstanding Writing for a Variety Special**: **Sarah Silverman: We Are Miracles – Sarah Silverman (HBO)**; The Beatles: The Night That Changed America – Kenneth Ehrlich and David Wild (CBS); 71st Golden Globe Awards (NBC); 700 Sundays – Billy Crystal and Alan Zweibel (HBO); 67th Tony Awards – Dave Boone and Paul Greenberg (CBS)	**Outstanding Writing for a Miniseries, Movie or Dramatic Special**: **Sherlock: His Last Vow – Steven Moffat (PBS)**; American Horror Story: Coven: "Bitchcraft" – Ryan Murphy and Brad Falchuk (FX); Fargo: "The Crocodile's Dilemma" – Noah Hawley (FX); Luther – Neil Cross (BBC America); The Normal Heart – Larry Kramer (HBO); Treme: "...To Miss New Orleans" – David Simon and Eric Overmyer (HBO)

== Most major nominations ==
Networks with multiple major nominations (Note: "Major" constitutes the categories listed above: Program, Acting, Directing, and Writing. Does not include the technical categories.)
Network	No. of Nominations
HBO	39
FX	20
CBS	14
Netflix	11
PBS	11
AMC	10
Showtime	10
ABC	9
NBC	7
Lifetime	5
BBC America	4
Fox	3
Comedy Central	2
IFC	2

Programs with multiple major nominations
Program	Category	Network	No. of Nominations
The Normal Heart	Movie	HBO	9
American Horror Story: Coven	Miniseries	FX	8
Fargo	Miniseries	FX	8
Breaking Bad	Drama	AMC	7
Downton Abbey	Drama	PBS	6
Game of Thrones	Drama	HBO	5
House of Cards	Drama	Netflix	5
Modern Family	Comedy	ABC	5
Orange Is the New Black	Comedy	Netflix	5
Sherlock: His Last Vow	Movie	PBS	5
True Detective	Drama	HBO	5
Veep	Comedy	HBO	5
Louie	Comedy	FX	4
The Big Bang Theory	Comedy	CBS	3
Episodes	Comedy	Showtime	3
The Good Wife	Drama	CBS	3
Luther	Miniseries	BBC America	3
Mad Men	Drama	AMC	3
Silicon Valley	Comedy	HBO	3
67th Tony Awards	Variety	CBS	2
The Beatles: The Night That Changed America	Variety	CBS	2
Girls	Comedy	HBO	2
Homeland	Drama	Showtime	2
Muhammad Ali's Greatest Fight	Movie	HBO	2
Saturday Night Live	Variety	NBC	2
Treme	Miniseries	HBO	2
The Trip to Bountiful	Movie	Lifetime	2

== Most major awards ==
Networks with multiple major awards
Network	No. of Awards
AMC	5
CBS	5
FX	5
HBO	4
ABC	3
PBS	3

Programs with multiple major awards
Program	Category	Network	No. of Awards
Breaking Bad	Drama	AMC	5
Modern Family	Comedy	ABC	3
Sherlock: His Last Vow	Movie	PBS	3
American Horror Story: Coven	Miniseries	FX	2
Fargo	Miniseries	FX	2

== Presenters and performers ==
The awards were presented by the following:

=== Presenters ===
Name(s)	Role
Amy Poehler	Presenter of the award for Outstanding Supporting Actor in a Comedy Series
Zooey Deschanel; Allison Williams	Presenters of the award for Outstanding Writing for a Comedy Series
Jimmy Kimmel	Presenter of the award for Outstanding Supporting Actress in a Comedy Series
Hayden Panettiere	Introducer of Outstanding Guest Actress in a Comedy Series winner Uzo Aduba
Uzo Aduba; Hayden Panettiere	Presenters of the award for Outstanding Directing for a Comedy Series
Bryan Cranston; Julia Louis-Dreyfus	Presenters of the award for Outstanding Lead Actor in a Comedy Series
Jimmy Fallon	Presenter of the award for Outstanding Lead Actress in a Comedy Series
Mindy Kaling; John Mulaney	Presenters of the award for Outstanding Reality-Competition Program
Allison Janney; Octavia Spencer	Presenters of the awards for Outstanding Writing for a Miniseries, Movie or Dramatic Special and Outstanding Supporting Actress in a Miniseries or Movie
Stephen Colbert	Presenter of the award for Outstanding Supporting Actor in a Miniseries or Movie
Scott Bakula; Kate Walsh	Presenter of the award for Outstanding Directing for a Miniseries, Movie or Dramatic Special
Woody Harrelson; Matthew McConaughey	Presenters of the award for Outstanding Lead Actor in a Miniseries or Movie
Liev Schreiber; Kerry Washington	Presenters of the award for Outstanding Lead Actress in a Miniseries or Movie
Seth Meyers; Andy Samberg	Introducers of the performance of TV theme songs updated by "Weird Al" Yankovic
Lena Headey	Presenter of the award for Outstanding Miniseries
Julianna Margulies	Presenter of the award for Outstanding Television Movie
Ricky Gervais	Presenter of the award for Outstanding Writing for a Variety Special
Keegan-Michael Key; Jordan Peele	Presenter of the accountants from Ernst & Young
Chris Hardwick	Presenter of the award for Outstanding Directing for a Variety Special
Adam Levine; Gwen Stefani	Presenters of the award for Outstanding Variety Series
Lucy Liu	Presenter of the award for Outstanding Supporting Actor in a Drama Series
Billy Crystal	Presenter of a special presentation dedicated to Robin Williams
Debra Messing; Jim Parsons	Presenters of the awards for Outstanding Directing for a Drama Series and Outstanding Supporting Actress in a Drama Series
Katherine Heigl	Introducer of Outstanding Guest Actor in a Drama Series winner Joe Morton
Joe Morton	Presenter of the award for Outstanding Writing for a Drama Series
Viola Davis	Presenter of the award for Outstanding Lead Actress in a Drama Series
Julia Roberts	Presenter of the award for Outstanding Lead Actor in a Drama Series
Jay Leno	Presenter of the award for Outstanding Comedy Series
Halle Berry	Presenter of the award for Outstanding Drama Series

=== Performers ===
Name(s)	Performed
"Weird Al" Yankovic; Andy Samberg	"Weird Al's Theme Songs"
Sara Bareilles	"Smile"

== In Memoriam ==
Sara Bareilles performed the song "Smile" during the "In Memoriam" segment of the awards ceremony:

- Ralph Waite
- Paul Walker
- Maximilian Schell
- Casey Kasem
- Abby Singer
- Meshach Taylor
- Robert Halmi Sr.
- Juanita Moore
- Sandy Frank
- Russell Johnson
- James Avery
- Daniel Blatt
- Sandi Fullerton
- Hank Rieger
- Paul Mazursky
- Ann B. Davis
- Eli Wallach
- Lucy Hood
- Hal Cooper
- Michael Filerman
- Alan Landsburg
- Philip Seymour Hoffman
- Peter O'Toole
- Mitzie Welch
- Don Pardo
- David Brenner
- Shirley Temple
- Efrem Zimbalist Jr.
- Carmen Zapata
- Hal Needham
- Sandy Grossman
- Ruby Dee
- Sheila MacRae
- Mickey Rooney
- Marcia Wallace
- Sid Caesar
- Harold Ramis
- Elaine Stritch
- Lauren Bacall
- James Garner
- Joan Fontaine
- Maya Angelou
- Bob Hoskins

After the last picture was shown, a special tribute to Robin Williams, who died on August 11, 2014, was presented by Billy Crystal.

== Ratings ==
Despite its departure from its normal telecast schedule, the 66th Primetime Emmy Awards received 15.59 million viewers, the second-largest viewership in eight years.
