= 21st Young Artist Awards =

2000 US media awards ceremony

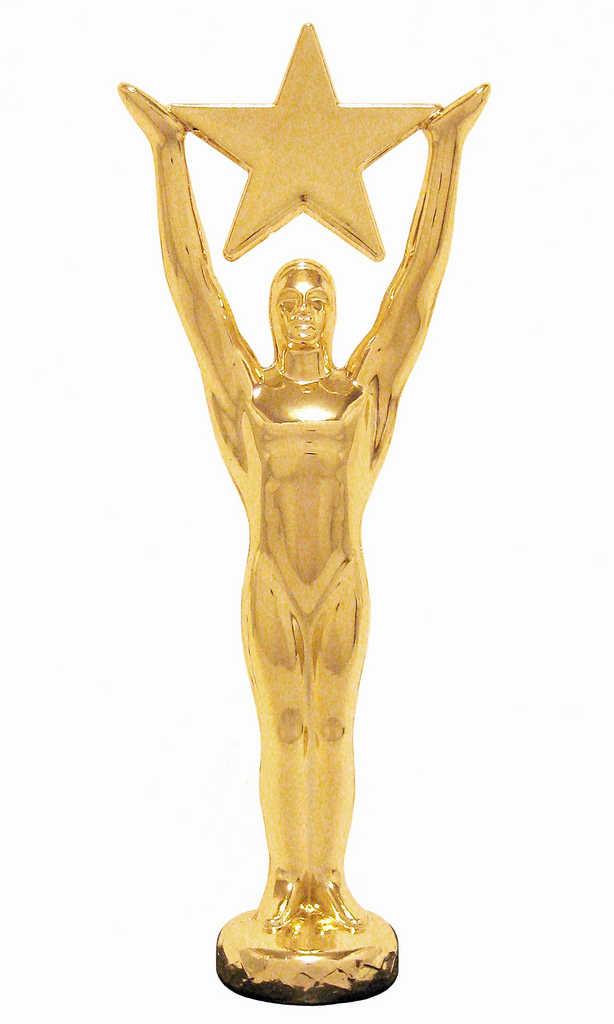
- Awarded for: Achievement in 1999 in film and television
- Date: March 19, 2000
- Site: Sportsmen's Lodge; Studio City, California
- Hosted by: Austin O'Brien; Trevor O'Brien; Cody McMains; Michelle Trachtenberg; Kaitlin Cullum; Kimberly Cullum

The 21st Young Artist Awards ceremony (formerly known as the Youth in Film Awards), presented by the Young Artist Association, honored excellence of young performers under the age of 21 in the fields of film, television and theatre for the year 1999, and took place on March 19, 2000, at the Sportsmen's Lodge in Studio City, California.

The announcer for the evening was William H. Bassett. The hosts for the evening were Austin O'Brien, Trevor O'Brien, Cody McMains, Michelle Trachtenberg, Kaitlin Cullum and Kimberly Cullum. Performers for the evening included, Girls On-Q, Adam Nicholson, Adam Wylie and Blake McIver Ewing.

Established in 1978 by long-standing Hollywood Foreign Press Association member, Maureen Dragone, the Young Artist Association was the first organization to establish an awards ceremony specifically set to recognize and award the contributions of performers under the age of 21 in the fields of film, television, theater and music.

== Categories ==
★ Bold indicates the winner in each category.

== Best Performance in a Feature Film ==
=== Best Performance in a Feature Film: Leading Young Actor ===
★ Haley Joel Osment - The Sixth Sense - Disney (Buena Vista Pictures)

- Lucas Black - Crazy in Alabama - Columbia Pictures
- Jeremy Blackman - Magnolia - New Line Cinema
- Noah Fleiss - Joe the King - Trimark
- Jake Gyllenhaal - October Sky - Universal

=== Best Performance in a Feature Film: Leading Young Actress ===
★ Kimberly J. Brown - Tumbleweeds - Fine Line Features

- Brittany Murphy - Girl, Interrupted - Columbia Pictures
- Natalie Portman - Anywhere But Here - 20th Century Fox
- Christina Ricci - Sleepy Hollow - Paramount
- Michelle Williams - Dick - TriStar Pictures

=== Best Performance in a Feature Film: Supporting Young Actor ===
★ (tie) Reeve Carney - Snow Falling on Cedars - Universal
★ (tie) Ryan Merriman - The Deep End of the Ocean - Columbia Pictures

- Miles Marsico - Stuart Little - Columbia Pictures
- Cody McMains - Tumbleweeds - Fine Line Features
- Kyle Sabihy - Analyze This - Warner Brothers

=== Best Performance in a Feature Film: Supporting Young Actress ===
★ Thora Birch - American Beauty - DreamWorks SKG

- Jena Malone - For Love of the Game - Universal
- Anna Paquin - A Walk on the Moon - Miramax
- Colleen Rennison - The Story of Us - Universal
- Michelle Trachtenberg - Inspector Gadget - Disney

=== Best Performance in a Feature Film: Young Actor Age Ten or Under ===
★ Jake Lloyd - Star Wars: Episode I – The Phantom Menace - 20th Century Fox

- Zachary David Cope - Stir of Echoes - Artisan Entertainment
- Jonathan Lipnicki - Stuart Little - Columbia Pictures
- Cole and Dylan Sprouse - Big Daddy - Columbia Pictures

=== Best Performance in a Feature Film: Young Actress Age Ten or Under ===
★ Scarlett Pomers - Happy, Texas - Miramax

- Penny Bae Bridges - True Crime - Warner Brothers
- Francesca Fisher-Eastwood - True Crime - Warner Brothers
- Alyssajo Norcliffe - Dream Parlor - Timeless Entertainment

== Best Performance in an International Film ==
=== Best Performance in an International Film: Young Performer ===
★ Wei Minzhi - Not One Less - China

- Joe Breen, Ciaran Owens, Michael Legge - Angela's Ashes - Ireland
- Keith Chin - Anna and the King - Malaysia
- Lester Llansang - Saranggola (The Kite) - Philippines
- Manuel Lozano - Butterfly's Tongue - Spain
- Mohsen Ramezani - The Color of Paradise - Iran
- Madelief Verelst - Scratches in the Table - Holland

== Best Performance in a TV Movie or Pilot ==
=== Best Performance in a TV Movie or Pilot: Leading Young Actor ===
★ Mason Gamble - Anya's Bell - CBS

- Jake Dinwiddie - Au Pair - Fox Family Channel
- Andrew Ducote - Judgment Day: The Ellie Nesler Story - USA Cable
- Jake LeDoux - Summer's End - Showtime
- Trevor Morgan - Genius - Disney Channel
- Jonathan Tucker - Mr. Music - Disney Channel

=== Best Performance in a TV Movie or Pilot: Leading Young Actress ===
★ Jamie Renee Smith - My Last Love - ABC

- Kirsten Dunst - The Devil's Arithmetic - Showtime
- Alicia Morton - Annie - ABC
- Tegan Moss - Sea People - Showtime
- Bethany Richards - Hayley Wagner, Star - Showtime
- Kirsten Storms - Zenon: Girl of the 21st Century - Disney Channel

=== Best Performance in a TV Movie or Pilot: Supporting Young Actor ===
★ Drake Bell - The Jack Bull - HBO

- Bill Switzer - Locked in Silence - Showtime
- Christopher Bell - Sarah, Plain and Tall: Winter's End - CBS
- Brendan Fletcher - Summer's End - Showtime
- Miko Hughes - Lethal Vows - CBS
- Will Rothhaar - Black and Blue - CBS

=== Best Performance in a TV Movie or Pilot: Supporting Young Actress ===
★ Hilary Duff - The Soul Collector - CBS

- Amanda Barfield - A Memory in My Heart - CBS
- Camilla Belle - Replacing Dad - CBS
- Sarah Francis - Summer's End - Showtime
- Alison Pill - Artists Specials: Degas and the Dancer - HBO
- Emmy Rossum - Genius - Disney Channel

=== Best Performance in a TV Movie or Pilot: Young Actor Age Ten or Under ===
★ Marc Donato - Locked in Silence - Showtime

- Seth Adkins - The Promise - CBS
- Jake Sakson - Don't Look Under the Bed - Disney Channel
- Jacob Smith - Evolution's Child - USA
- Michal Suchánek - Aftershock: Earthquake in New York - CBS
- Hayden Tank - Replacing Dad - CBS

=== Best Performance in a TV Movie or Pilot: Young Actress Age Ten or Under ===
★ Brittney Lee Harvey - Mr. Murder - ABC

- Courtney Chase - Nick of Time - ABC
- Emily Osment - Sarah, Plain and Tall: Winter's End - CBS
- Hayden Panettiere - If You Believe - Lifetime
- Katie Volding - Smart House - Disney Channel

== Best Performance in a Drama Series ==
=== Best Performance in a Drama Series: Leading Young Actor ===
★ Austin O'Brien - Promised Land - CBS

- Brandon Gilberstadt - 100 Deeds for Eddie McDowd - Nickelodeon
- Arjay Smith - The Journey of Allen Strange - Nickelodeon

=== Best Performance in a Drama Series: Leading Young Actress ===
★ Beverley Mitchell - 7th Heaven - Warner Brothers

- Majandra Delfino - Roswell - Warner Brothers
- Sarah Schaub - Promised Land - CBS

=== Best Performance in a Drama Series: Supporting Young Actor ===
★ Dan Byrd - Any Day Now - Lifetime

- Cameron Finley - Baywatch - Syndicated
- Robert Iler - The Sopranos - HBO
- Courtland Mead - NYPD Blue - ABC
- Max Peters - Hope Island - PAX
- Shane Sweet - The Journey of Allen Strange - Nickelodeon

=== Best Performance in a Drama Series: Supporting Young Actress ===
★ Shari Dyon Perry - Any Day Now - Lifetime

- Erin J. Dean - The Journey of Allen Strange - Nickelodeon
- Heather Matarazzo - Now and Again - CBS
- Jamie-Lynn Sigler - The Sopranos - HBO
- Julia Whelan - Once and Again - ABC
- Evan Rachel Wood - Profiler - NBC

=== Best Performance in a Drama Series: Young Actor Age Ten and Under ===
★ Myles Jeffrey - Early Edition - CBS

- Bobby Borriello - The Sopranos - HBO
- Jeffrey Schoeny - The X-Files - FOX

=== Best Performance in a Drama Series: Young Actress Age Ten and Under ===
★ Mae Middleton - Any Day Now - Lifetime

- Chea Courtney - Melrose Place - FOX
- Brittany Tiplady - Millennium - FOX
- Karle Warren - Judging Amy - CBS

=== Best Performance in a Drama Series: Guest Starring Young Actor ===
★ Tony C. Barriere - Any Day Now - Lifetime

- Carlo Alban - Touched by an Angel - CBS
- Bobby Edner - Touched by an Angel - CBS
- Chas Smith]- Chicago Hope - CBS
- Scott Terra - Charmed - Warner Brothers
- Jake Thomas - Touched by an Angel - CBS

=== Best Performance in a Drama Series: Guest Starring Young Actress ===
★ Kaitlin Cullum - 7th Heaven - Warner Brothers

- Ashley Edner - Party of Five - FOX
- Rachel Grate - ER - NBC
- Hallee Hirsh - Law and Order - NBC
- Aysia Polk - JAG - NBC
- Caitlin Wachs - The Pretender - NBC

== Best Performance in a Comedy Series ==
=== Best Performance in a Comedy Series: Leading Young Actor ===
★ Thomas Dekker - Honey, I Shrunk the Kids - Syndicated

- Robert Ri'chard - Cousin Skeeter - Nickelodeon
- Lee Thompson Young - The Famous Jett Jackson - Disney Channel

=== Best Performance in a Comedy Series: Leading Young Actress ===
★ Georgina Sherrington - The Worst Witch - HBO

- Amanda Bynes - The Amanda Show - Nickelodeon
- Mila Kunis - That '70s Show - FOX

=== Best Performance in a Comedy Series: Supporting Young Actor ===
★ Andrew Ducote - Thanks - CBS

- Ryan Sommers Baum - The Famous Jett Jackson - Disney Channel
- Daniel Clark - I Was a Sixth Grade Alien - Fox Family Channel
- Dee Jay Daniels - The Hughleys - ABC
- Leon Curtis Frierson - All That - Nickelodeon
- Eric Lloyd - Jesse - NBC

=== Best Performance in a Comedy Series: Supporting Young Actress ===
★ Kerry Duff - The Famous Jett Jackson - Disney Channel

- Ashley Lyn Cafagna - Saved by the Bell: The New Class - NBC
- Amy Centner - Thanks - CBS
- Courtney Peldon - Home Improvement - ABC
- Brianne Prather - The Jersey - Disney Channel
- Alexa Vega - Ladies Man - CBS
- Shawna Waldron - Ladies Man - CBS

=== Best Performance in a Comedy Series: Young Performer Age Ten or Under ===
★ Sara Paxton - Working - NBC

- Ashley Monique Clark - The Hughleys - ABC
- Rachel David - Movie Stars - Warner Brothers
- Ashley & Lindsey Trefger - Home Improvement - ABC

=== Best Performance in a Comedy Series: Guest Starring Young Performer ===
★ J.B. Gaynor - Boy Meets World - ABC

- Cory Buck - Sports Night - ABC
- Alexandra Gilliams - Sabrina, the Teenage Witch - ABC
- Rachel Glenn - Cousin Skeeter - Nickelodeon
- Matt Weinberg - Friends - NBC
- Joey Zimmerman - Cupid - ABC

== Best Performance in a Soap Opera ==
=== Best Performance in a Soap Opera: Young Actor ===
★ David Lago - The Young and the Restless - CBS

- Joseph Cross - As the World Turns - CBS
- Josh Ryan Evans - Passions - CBS
- Jesse McCartney - All My Children - ABC
- Logan O'Brien - General Hospital - ABC
- Nicholas Pappone - The Young and the Restless CBS

=== Best Performance in a Soap Opera: Young Actress ===
★ Taylor Anne Mountz - Passions - NBC

- Chea Courtney - Passions - NBC
- Adrienne Frantz - The Bold and the Beautiful - CBS
- Carly Schroeder - Port Charles - CBS
- Brittany Snow - Guiding Light - CBS
- Erin Torpey - One Life to Live - NBC

== Best Performance in a Voice-Over ==
=== Best Performance in a Voice-Over (TV or Feature Film): Young Actor ===
★ Eli Marienthal - The Iron Giant - Warner Brothers

- Joseph Ashton - Rocket Power - Nickelodeon
- Michael James Caloz - Arthur - KCET
- Rickey D'Shon Collins - Recess - ABC
- Alex D. Linz - Tarzan - Disney

=== Best Performance in a Voice-Over (TV or Feature Film): Young Actress ===
★ Aria Noelle Curzon - Dan Danger - Nickelodeon

- Kristin Fairlie - Little Bear - Nickelodeon
- Olivia Hack - Hey Arnold! - Nickelodeon
- Emily Hart - Sabrina: The Animated Series - UPN
- Ashley Johnson - Recess - ABC

== Best Ensemble Performance ==
=== Best Performance in a Feature Film or TV Movie: Young Ensemble ===
★ Shiloh 2: Shiloh Season - Warner Brothers

Zachary Browne, Rachel David, Marissa Leigh, Joe Pichler and Caitlin Wachs

- Annie - ABC

Erin Adams, Sarah Hyland, Lalaine, Alicia Morton, Nanea Miyata, Marissa Rago and Danelle Wilson

- The Artists Specials: Mary Cassatt, an American Impressionist - HBO

Emma Isherwood, Jonathan Koensgen and Charlotte Sullivan

- Music of the Heart - Miramax

Michael Angarano, Melay Araya, Henry Dinhoffer, Jean Luke Figueroa, Victoria Gomez, Justin Spaulding, Zoe Sternbach-Taubman and Jade Yorker

=== Best Performance in a TV Series: Young Ensemble ===
★ The Jersey - Disney Channel

Courtnee Draper, Michael Galeota, Theo Greenly and Jermaine Williams

- Freaks and Geeks - NBC

John Francis Daley, James Franco, Sarah Hagan, Jarrett Lennon, Samm Levine, Seth Rogen, Jason Segel and Martin Starr

- Get Real - FOX

Jesse Eisenberg, Kyle Brent Gibson, Anne Hathaway and Eric Christian Olsen

- Little Men - PAX

Trevor Blumas, Alex Campbell, Brittney Irvin, Corey Sevier and Rachel Skarsten

- Safe Harbor - WB

Orlando Brown, Christopher Khayman Lee, Jeremy Lelliott, Chyler Lleigh and Jamie Williams

- So Weird - Disney Channel

Erik von Detten; Patrick Levis; Cara DeLizia; Eric Lively

== Best Family Entertainment ==
=== Best Family TV Movie or Pilot: Network ===
★ Anya's Bell - CBS

- Annie - ABC
- Behind the Mask - CBS
- Dr. Quinn, Medicine Woman: The Movie - CBS
- My Last Love - ABC
- Sabrina, Down Under - ABC
- Secret of Giving - CBS
- The Simple Life of Noah Dearborn - CBS

=== Best Family TV Movie or Pilot: Cable ===
★ Summer's End - Showtime

- The Thirteenth Year - Disney Channel
- A Lesson Before Dying - HBO
- Gift of Love: The Daniel Huffman Story - Showtime
- Hayley Wagner, Star - Showtime
- Horse Sense - Disney Channel
- Sea People - Showtime
- The Artist Specials: Mary Cassatt: An American Impressionist - HBO

=== Best Animated TV Show or Series ===
★ Sabrina: The Animated Series - ABC

- Angela Anaconda - Fox Family Channel
- Bear in the Big Blue House - Disney Channel
- Blue's Clues - Nickelodeon
- Mike, Lu & Og - Cartoon Network
- Recess - ABC

=== Best Family TV Drama Series ===
★ Judging Amy - CBS

- 7th Heaven - Warner Brothers
- 100 Deeds for Eddie McDowd - Nickelodeon
- Hope Island - PAX
- Little Men - PAX
- So Weird - Disney Channel
- Touched by an Angel - CBS

=== Best Family TV Comedy Series ===
★ Freaks and Geeks - NBC

- Animals Are People Too - PAX
- The Famous Jett Jackson - Disney Channel
- The Hughleys - ABC
- The Jersey - Disney Channel
- Kids Say the Darndest Things - CBS

=== Best Family Feature Film for 1999: Animated ===
★ Toy Story 2 - Disney

- The Adventures of Elmo in Grouchland - Columbia Pictures
- The Iron Giant - Warner Brothers
- Pokémon: The First Movie - Warner Brothers
- Tarzan - Disney

=== Best Family Feature Film for 1999: Comedy ===
★ Stuart Little - Columbia Pictures

- Inspector Gadget - Disney
- Muppets from Space - Columbia Pictures
- Never Been Kissed - 20th Century Fox
- The Other Sister - Touchstone

=== Best Family Feature Film for 1999: Drama ===
★ Music of the Heart - Miramax

- Anna and the King - 20th Century Fox
- For Love of the Game - Universal
- October Sky - Universal
- Star Wars: Episode I – The Phantom Menace - 20th Century Fox
- The Straight Story - Disney

=== Best International Film ===
★ Not One Less - China

- The Butterfly's Tongue - Spain
- The Color of Paradise - Iran
- Saranggola (The Kite) - Philippines
- Scratches in the Table - Holland

== Special awards ==
=== Outstanding Young Performer in Theater ===
★ Roberto Cisneros - The Smuin Ballet, San Francisco

=== Outstanding Young Performers in a Television Commercial ===
★ Hallie Kate Eisenberg - Pepsi
★ Connor Matheus - K-Mart

=== The Jackie Coogan Award ===
==== Outstanding Contribution to Youth Through Motion Pictures ====
★ George Lucas - Producer, Lucasfilm

=== The Mickey Rooney Award ===
==== Former Child Star Life Achievement Award ====
★ Lucille Bliss - voice of "Anastasia" in Disney's Cinderella (1950)

=== The Michael Landon Award ===
==== Community Service to Youth ====
★ Kids On Stage For A Better World

=== Young Artist Awards Scholarship ===
★ R. J. Arnett
