= Ariel (The Little Mermaid) =

Character from The Little Mermaid

- The Little Mermaid character
- Ariel in her mermaid form
- First appearance: The Little Mermaid (1989)
- Created by: Ron Clements; John Musker
- Based on: The Little Mermaid by Hans Christian Andersen
- Voiced by: Jodi Benson (1989–present); Kathryn Haywood (Ariel's Majestic Journey); Mykal-Michelle Harris (Ariel)
- Portrayed by: Marietta DePrima (Little Mermaid's Island); Sierra Boggess (musical); Rachelle Ann Go (2011 musical); Auliʻi Cravalho (The Little Mermaid Live!); Halle Bailey (2023 film)

In-universe information
- Nickname: The Little Mermaid
- Species: Human (via magical transformation); Mermaid (originally)
- Title: Princess Consort of Prince Eric's Kingdom; Princess of Atlantica
- Affiliation: Disney Princesses
- Family: King Triton (father); Queen Athena (mother); Attina, Alana, Adella, Aquata, Arista and Andrina (older sisters)
- Spouses: Prince Eric
- Children: Melody
- Relatives: King Poseidon (paternal grandfather); King Neptune (paternal great-grandfather); Ursula (paternal aunt in some media)
- Nationality: Atlantican
- Age: 16 (first film); 15 (Ariel's Beginning); 8 (Ariel)

Ariel is a fictional character and the titular protagonist in Walt Disney Pictures' The Little Mermaid franchise, first appearing in the 1989 animated film. Voiced by Jodi Benson, Ariel is the youngest daughter of King Triton and Queen Athena of an underwater kingdom called Atlantica. She is often rebellious, and in the first film, she longs to be a part of the human world. She marries Prince Eric, whom she rescued from a shipwreck, and together they have a daughter, Melody. She is the fourth Disney Princess, the first Disney Princess to be developed during the Disney Renaissance, and the first Disney Princess since Aurora.

The character is based on the title character of Hans Christian Andersen's 1837 fairy tale "The Little Mermaid" but was developed into a different personality for the 1989 animated film adaptation. Ariel has received a mixed reception from critics; some publications such as Time criticize her for being too devoted to Eric whereas others, such as Empire, praise the character for her rebellious personality, a departure from previous Disney Princesses' roles. Halle Bailey portrays a live-action version of the character in the 2023 live-action adaptation of the original 1989 film.

== Development ==
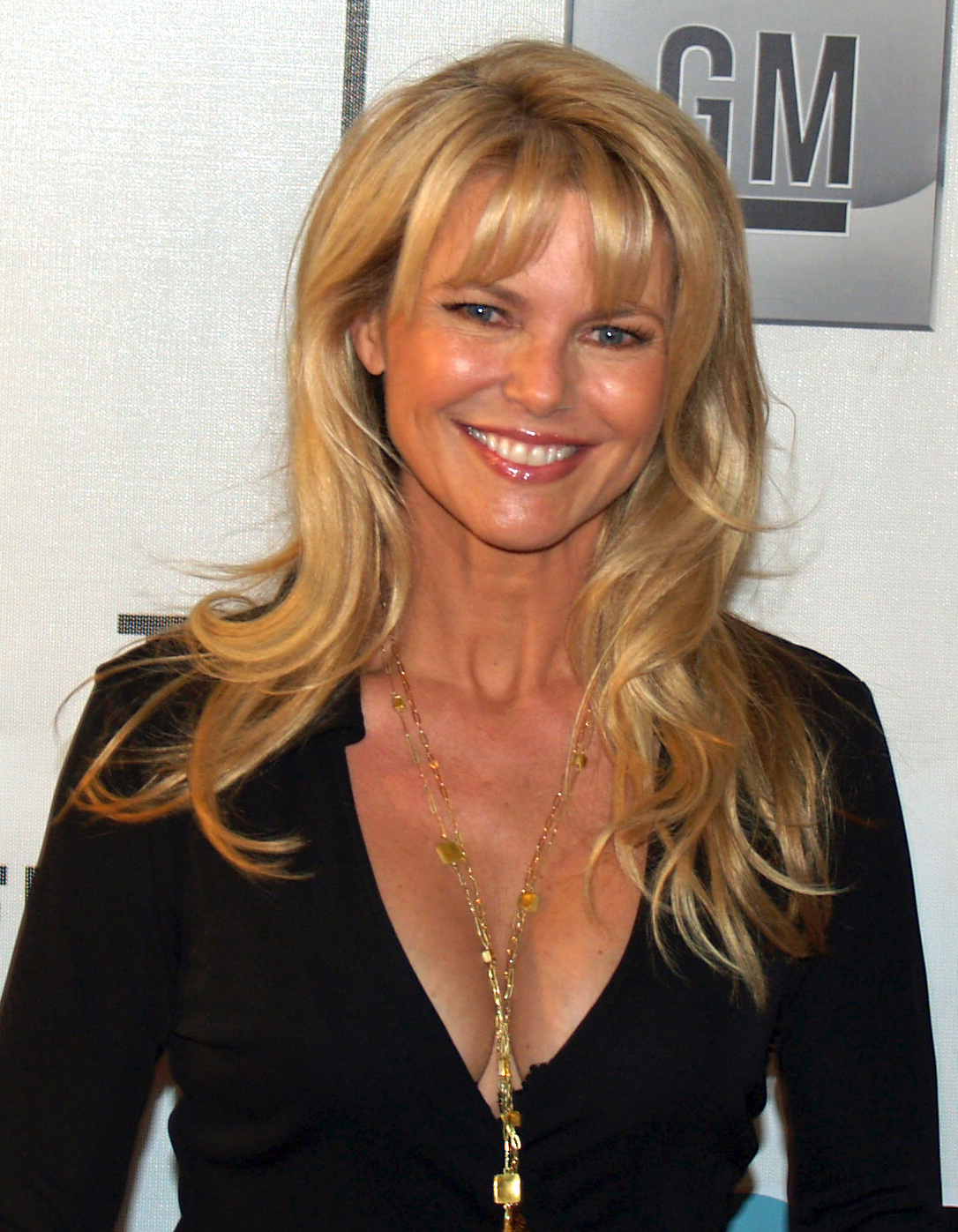
Christie Brinkley was one of the inspirations for Ariel's design

Ariel was based on the title character of Hans Christian Andersen's "The Little Mermaid", but co-director and writer Ron Clements felt that the mermaid in the original story was too tragic and rewrote the character, resulting in Ariel.

I heard "Part of Your World", Jodi Benson singing that, and it just captivated me. I have to do that. And I went and told those guys, "I really wanna do Ariel." And they said, "Well, I don't know. This is supposed to be a pretty girl. Can you do that?" I said, "Look, I have to do Ariel. I mean, I can feel it in my heart."

— Glen Keane, Ariel's supervising animator

Jodi Benson, who was predominantly a stage actress, was chosen to voice Ariel because the directors felt "it was really important to have the same person doing the singing and speaking voice". Clements stated that Benson's voice had a unique "sweetness" and "youthfulness". When recording the vocals for "Part of Your World", Benson asked that the lights in the studio be dimmed, to create the feeling of being deep under the sea. "Part of Your World", which was referred to by songwriter Howard Ashman as the "I Want" song, was originally going to be cut from the final film, owing to Jeffrey Katzenberg's belief that it slowed the story down, but Ashman and Keane fought to keep it in.

Ariel's original design was developed by animator Glen Keane. Her appearance was based on a number of inspirational sources, Christie Brinkley, Alyssa Milano (who was 16 at the time in addition to hosting the making of the special on Disney Channel), and model-comedian Sherri Stoner, who provided live-action references for the animators during the development of the film. She would later do the live-action references for Belle (Paige O'Hara) in Beauty and the Beast. The movement of Ariel's hair underwater was based on footage of astronaut Sally Ride while she was in space. Extra reference was given by filming Stoner swimming in a pool, which also helped guide Ariel's aquatic movement.

A challenge in animating Ariel for the 1989 film was the color required to show Ariel in the changing environments, both under the sea and on land, for which the animators required thirty-two color models, not including costume changes. The sea-green color of Ariel's mermaid tail was a hue specially mixed by the Disney paint lab; the color was named "Ariel" after the character. The choice of red as Ariel's hair color was the subject of dispute between the filmmakers and studio executives who wanted the character to have blonde hair. It was noted that red hair contrasted better with Ariel's green tail, red was easier to darken than yellow, and Disney's live-action branch Touchstone Pictures had recently released Splash that had a blonde mermaid; Ariel's red hair was ultimately kept.

In an interview, Jodi Benson stated that for Ariel's Beginning, the writers revised the script multiple times to make sure Ariel retained her relevance in a more modern context. Benson complained to them that they wrote Ariel out of character and suggested they bring her back to her roots.

== Characteristics ==
Ariel is the youngest of King Triton and Queen Athena's seven daughters. She is often seen in the company of Flounder, her best friend, and Sebastian, her father's advisor who is often assigned to keep an eye on her. In the television series and first film, Ariel has a fascination with the human world and often goes off to find human artifacts that she displays in a secret grotto. Ariel, a free spirit, is often rebellious, wandering off on her own to explore her surroundings, and frequently disobeys the orders of her father or Sebastian, causing conflict between the characters. In The Little Mermaid, she is depicted as being willing to do anything to be with Prince Eric, even giving up her voice to become human. Clements described her as a typical teenager, prone to errors of judgment. She also is incredibly curious, and her curiosity often leads her into dangerous situations.

Ariel is kind and caring to others no matter what their circumstances, as depicted in the television series. In an early episode, Ariel helps an orphaned merboy who had fallen in with a bad crowd. In another episode, Ariel befriends a supposed bad luck creature and protects it from Ursula and other merfolk who wish it harm. Ariel appears as an adult in Return to the Sea and gives birth to a daughter named Melody, becoming the first, and currently, only, Disney princess to become a mother. Ariel is protective of her daughter, as Triton was of Ariel in the first film. After Morgana threatens Ariel and King Triton, Prince Eric and Ariel build a wall around the palace to protect Melody from Morgana and other terrors of the ocean. Although it protected her, it could not protect her curiosity. Ariel's Beginning depicts her personality as it was in the original film after Jodi Benson had advocated returning the character to her roots. Ariel is, once again, a rebellious free spirit, and after her father decrees music to be banned in Atlantica she runs away with Sebastian and his band.

== Appearances ==
=== The Little Mermaid ===
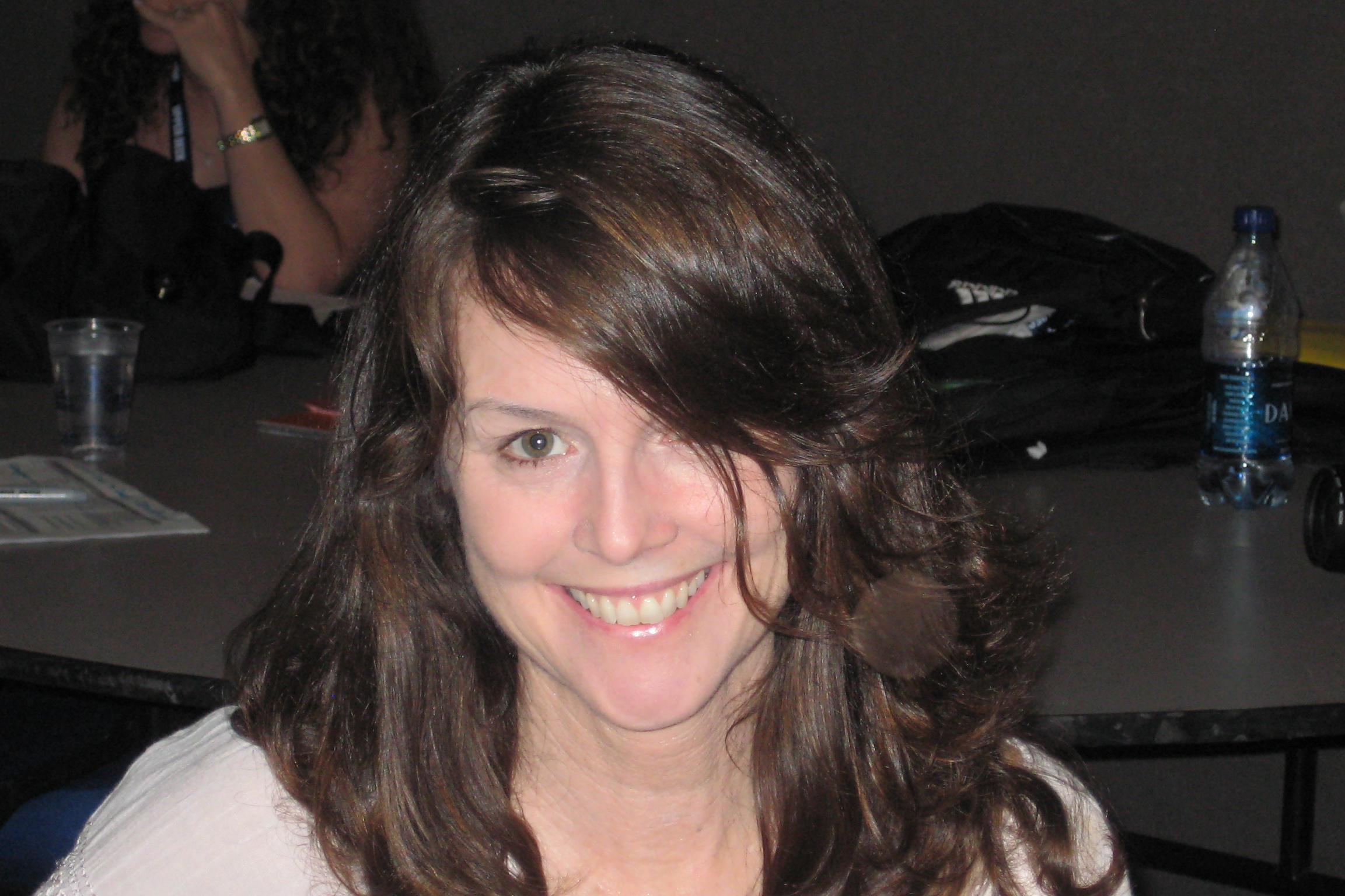
For the 1989 film, many of Ariel's mannerisms were copied from Sherri Stoner's live-action performance as the character

Ariel first appears in The Little Mermaid (1989), in which she is shown as being adventurous and curious about the world of humans, a fascination which annoys both her father King Triton and his court composer Sebastian, as merfolk are not allowed to make contact with the human world. She and Flounder go in search of human objects, which they take to a seagull named Scuttle for appraisal. Ariel falls in love with a human prince named Prince Eric after saving him from drowning, and visits the sea witch, Ursula, who agrees to turn her into a human in exchange for her voice. Ariel must make Prince Eric fall in love with her and romantically kiss her within three days, lest she belong to Ursula forever.

Unknown to Ariel, this agreement is part of Ursula's bigger plan to trap Ariel's father, King Triton and steal his magical trident. After being transformed, Ariel found that she can no longer breathe, nor swim. Sebastian and Flounder take her to the surface. She is soon found by Eric and is taken back to his castle. Ariel almost manages to obtain the "kiss of true love", but is stopped by Ursula's underhanded tactics. On the second day, Ursula transforms herself into a human, calling herself "Vanessa" and using Ariel's voice, bewitches Eric to make him marry her on the third day. After learning from Scuttle that the woman is Ursula in disguise, Ariel disrupts the wedding and regains her voice, but the sun sets as Ariel and Prince Eric are about to kiss, transforming Ariel back into a mermaid. After transforming herself back into her true witch form, Ursula takes Ariel back into the ocean, where she is met by King Triton and Sebastian.

Triton trades himself for Ariel, enabling Ursula to steal his crown and enabling her to claim his trident, which angers Ariel, who will not allow Ursula to destroy merfolk and humans. In the battle that follows, Ariel is trapped at the bottom of a whirlpool. Before Ursula can kill her, Eric impales Ursula with a derelict ship's splintered prow. After Ursula dies, her spell is broken, and King Triton and the merfolk are transformed back to normal merpeople. At the end of the film, after King Triton uses his magical trident to transform Ariel into a human, she leaves the sea to live in the human world. She and Eric marry and live happily ever after.

=== Television series ===
A prequel television series that originally aired from 1992 to 1994, depicts Ariel's life as a mermaid under the sea with Sebastian, Flounder, and her father. Ariel appears in all 31 episodes of the series, which is set an unspecified time before the first film. The series follows Ariel's adventures with her friends and family and sometimes has Ariel foiling the attempts of enemies that are intent on harming her or the kingdom of Atlantica.

Ariel's relationships with various characters from the film are highlighted and expanded, such as the love and occasional conflict between Ariel and her father, how Ariel met Flounder and Scuttle, the relationships between Ariel and her sisters, and Ariel's early fear and avoidance of Ursula the sea witch. Other recurring new characters are also introduced, such as orphaned merboy Urchin and mute mermaid Gabriella that become Ariel's friends, as well as the Evil Manta, Lobster Mobster and Da Shrimp, who are Ariel's enemies. Ariel's mother is absent, having already died prior to the events of the series, though she is occasionally mentioned in vague terms. In one episode Ariel comes across Hans Christian Andersen, author of "The Little Mermaid", while he was traveling underwater in a primitive submarine. In the fictionalized encounter she saves Andersen's life, inspiring him to write the story.

Some episodes of the series are musical and feature original songs performed by the characters. A soundtrack containing some of these songs was released in 1992 under the title "Splash Hits".

=== The Little Mermaid II: Return to the Sea ===
In The Little Mermaid II: Return to the Sea (2000), Ariel, now the queen consort of Eric's kingdom has given birth to a daughter named Melody. When Melody's safety is threatened by Ursula's sister Morgana after using her as a hostage to get Triton's trident, Ariel and her husband Eric decide they must keep Melody away from the sea. So they build a large wall to separate it from the castle.

But Melody's love of the sea proves too strong and she visits Morgana, who turns her into a mermaid temporarily. King Triton uses his trident to transform Ariel back into her own mermaid form to find and rescue Melody. Morgana tricks Melody into taking part in a plot to steal her grandfather King Triton's trident. Together with Tip the Penguin and Dash the Walrus she goes to Atlantica and succeeds in acquiring the trident. Ariel arrives as they return with it to Morgana, and tries to persuade Melody to give back the trident. Morgana then reveals her true intentions. She calmly mentions that the spell that turned Melody into mermaid will wear off by sundown, then uses the trident's magic to lord over the ocean, rising to the surface to gloat. Scuttle, Triton, Sebastian, and Eric arrive, and a battle ensues against Morgana and her minions. Soon after the sunset, Morgana's spell wears off, and Melody returns to human form. Ariel saves Eric from Cloak and Dagger who tied him and pulled it into the depths and Melody manages to grab the trident and returns it to King Triton, who then punishes Morgana by sending her to the bottom of the ocean frozen in a block of ice.

Triton returns Ariel to human form, the wall separating Eric's castle from the sea is torn down, and contact between humans and merfolk is restored.

=== The Little Mermaid: Ariel's Beginning ===
The prologue of The Little Mermaid: Ariel's Beginning (2008) shows Ariel as a young mermaid, living happily with her father, King Triton, her mother, Queen Athena, and her six older sisters. As Ariel and her family relax in a lagoon, a pirate ship approaches and everyone flees except Athena, who returns to recover a music box Triton had given her and is killed when the ship crushes her. Afterwards, a devastated King Triton bans all music from Atlantica and throws the music box deep into the ocean. Ariel and her sisters grow up forgetting music and living under their father's strict rules, enforced by Marina del Rey, their governess.

Ariel meets Flounder and follows him to a secret underground club where Sebastian and his band play music. There she sings the song "I Remember", which reminds her of her distant past surrounded by love and music, and of her mother. Ariel introduces her sisters to the club, but eventually they are caught thanks to Marina, who had followed them. Sebastian and his band are imprisoned and the club is closed under Triton's orders. After arguing with Triton, Ariel breaks the band out of prison and escapes with them.

With Sebastian's assistance, Ariel finds her mother's music box, and they decide to return it to Triton. On their way back to Atlantica, they encounter Marina, and a struggle ensues in which Ariel is knocked unconscious, witnessed by Triton. Ariel makes a full recovery, and a remorseful Triton allows music back into Atlantica.

== International versions ==
Following the first film's initial release, several other dubs were released in 1989 and more in 1990. Several countries redubbed the film for a re-release in 1998. Norwegian singer Sissel Kyrkjebø dubbed the character in both Norwegian and Swedish, and the singing voice in Danish. Simona Patitucci, the first film's Italian voice, won a prize as the Best European Ariel in 2001.

Ariel's dubbers worldwide
Language	Release year(s) of dub(s)					Voice				
Language	The Little Mermaid	The Little Mermaid (TV series)	The Little Mermaid II: Return to the Sea	The Little Mermaid: Ariel's Beginning	The Little Mermaid (live-action)	The Little Mermaid	The Little Mermaid (TV series)	The Little Mermaid II: Return to the Sea	The Little Mermaid: Ariel's Beginning	The Little Mermaid (live-action)
Arabic (Egypt)	1998	—N/a	2006	2008	2023	رولا_زكي (Rula Zaky)		لانا غسان (Lana Ghassan) (speaking)		رنا عادل (Rana Adel)
Arabic (Egypt)	1998	—N/a	2006	2008	2023	رولا_زكي (Rula Zaky)		نهى فكري (Noha Ferky) (singing)	دينا إسكندر (Dina Iskandar) (singing)	رنا عادل (Rana Adel)
Arabic (Modern Standard)	2022	2015-2016	Not dubbed		2023	أريج فودة (Arig Fouda)	إيناس صبري (Inas Sabry) (speaking)	Not dubbed		رنا عادل (Rana Adel)
Arabic (Modern Standard)	2022	2015-2016	Not dubbed		2023	أريج فودة (Arig Fouda)	نهى قيس (Noha Qais) (singing)	Not dubbed		رنا عادل (Rana Adel)
Bulgarian	2006	Not dubbed			2023	Мина Костова (Mina Kostova) (speaking)	Not dubbed			Димитрина Германова (Dimitrina Germanova) (speaking)
Bulgarian	2006	Not dubbed			2023	Весела Бонева (Vesela Boneva) (singing)	Not dubbed			Димитрина Германова (Dimitrina Germanova) (speaking)
Cantonese	1991	—N/a	2000	2008	Not dubbed	朱妙蘭 (Zyu Miu-Laan "Peggy Chu") (speaking)	—N/a	馮蔚衡 (Fung Wai-Hang) (speaking)		Not dubbed
Cantonese	1991	—N/a	2000	2008	Not dubbed	鄺美雲 (Kwong Mei-Wan "Cally Kwong) (singing)	—N/a	陳美鳳 (Can Mei-Fung "May Chan") (singing)		Not dubbed
Chinese (China)	2007	Not dubbed	2007	2009	2023	李潇潇 (Lǐ Xiāo-Xiāo "Eva Lee")	Not dubbed	—N/a		赵双 (Zhào Shuāng) (speaking)
Chinese (China)	2007	Not dubbed	2007	2009	2023	李潇潇 (Lǐ Xiāo-Xiāo "Eva Lee")	Not dubbed	—N/a		单依纯 (Shàn Yī-Chún) (singing)
Chinese (Taiwan)	1991	—N/a	2000	2008	2023	宋文 (Sòng Wén "Ariel Sung")	—N/a	陳德容 (Chén Dé-Róng) (speaking)	劉小芸 (Liú Xiǎo-Yún)	閻奕格 (Yán Yì-Gé "Janice Yan")
Chinese (Taiwan)	1991	—N/a	2000	2008	2023	宋文 (Sòng Wén "Ariel Sung")	Jodi Benson (singing "Edge of the Sea" & "Harmony" *)	陳秀珠 (Chén Xiù-Zhū "Judy Chen")	劉小芸 (Liú Xiǎo-Yún)	閻奕格 (Yán Yì-Gé "Janice Yan")
Croatian	2006		Not dubbed		2023	Renata Sabljak		Not dubbed		Lana Meniga (speaking)
Croatian	2006		Not dubbed		2023	Renata Sabljak		Not dubbed		Mateja Majerle (singing)
Czech	1998	1994	2000	2016	2023	Jana Mařasová			Ivana Korolová	Natálie Grossová
Czech	1998	2004	2000	2016	2023	Jana Mařasová			Ivana Korolová	Natálie Grossová
Danish	1990	1992-1994	2000	2008	2023	Marie Ingerslev (speaking)	Louise Fribo			Annelie "Karui" Saemala Overbeck
Danish	1990	1992-1994	2000	2008	2023	Sissel Kyrkjebø (singing)	Louise Fribo			Annelie "Karui" Saemala Overbeck
Danish	1998	1992-1994	2000	2008	2023	Marie Ingerslev (speaking)	Louise Fribo			Annelie "Karui" Saemala Overbeck
Danish	1998	1992-1994	2000	2008	2023	Sissel Kyrkjebø (singing)	Louise Fribo			Annelie "Karui" Saemala Overbeck
Dutch	1989	1997	2000	2008	2023	Laura Vlasblom				Lynn Mancel
English	1989	1992-1994	2000	2008	2023	Jodi Benson				Halle Bailey
Finnish	1990	1992-1994	2000	2008	2023	Johanna Nurmimaa		Nina Tapio		Yasmine Yamajako
Finnish	1998	1992-1994	2000	2008	2023	Nina Tapio	Nina Tapio (singing in season 3, episode 7)	Nina Tapio		Yasmine Yamajako
French (Canada)	1989	Not dubbed	2000	Not dubbed	2023	Violette Chauveau (speaking)	Not dubbed	Violette Chauveau (speaking)	Not dubbed	Audrey-Louise Beauséjour
French (Canada)	1989	Not dubbed	2000	Not dubbed	2023	Dominique Faure (singing)	Not dubbed	Nancy Fortin (singing)	Not dubbed	Audrey-Louise Beauséjour
French (France)	1990	1994-1998	2000	2008	2023	Claire Guyot	Claire Guyot	Claire Guyot (speaking)		Cerise Calixte
French (France)	1998	1994-1998	2000	2008	2023	Claire Guyot (speaking)	Claire Guyot	Marie Galey (singing)		Cerise Calixte
French (France)	1998	1994-1998	2000	2008	2023	Marie Galey (singing)	Claire Guyot	Marie Galey (singing)		Cerise Calixte
Georgian	Not dubbed				2023	Not dubbed				სოფიო კაკულია (Sophio Kakulia)
German (Austria)	1998	Not dubbed				Caroline Vasicek	Not dubbed			
German (Germany)	1990	1994-1996	2000	2008	2023	Dorette Hugo (speaking)	Dorette Hugo (speaking)	Anna Carlsson (speaking)		Rieke Werner (speaking)
German (Germany)	1990	1994-1996	2000	2008	2023	Ute Lemper (singing)	Dorette Hugo (speaking)	Anna Carlsson (speaking)		Rieke Werner (speaking)
German (Germany)	1998	1994-1996	2000	2008	2023	Anna Carlsson (speaking)	Jana Werner (singing)	Naomi van Dooren (singing)		Sophia Riedl (singing)
German (Germany)	1998	1994-1996	2000	2008	2023	Naomi van Dooren (singing)	Jana Werner (singing)	Naomi van Dooren (singing)		Sophia Riedl (singing)
Greek	1990	1997-1998	2000	2008	2023	Κρίστη Στασινοπούλου (Krísti Stasinopoúlou)	Άριελ Κωνσταντινίδη (Áriel Konstantinídi)	Χριστίνα Κουλουμπή (Hristína Kouloumpí) (speaking)		Μαρίνα Σάττι (Marina Satti)
Greek	1998	2004	2000	2008	2023	Χριστίνα Κουλουμπή (Hristína Kouloumpí) (speaking)		Χαρά Κεφαλά (Hará Kefalá) (singing)	Μαρίνα Σάττι (Marina Satti) (singing)	Μαρίνα Σάττι (Marina Satti)
Greek	1998	2004	2000	2008	2023	Άννα Ρόσση (Anna Rossi) (singing)	Χριστίνα Αργύρη (Hristína Aryíri) (singing)	Χαρά Κεφαλά (Hará Kefalá) (singing)	Μαρίνα Σάττι (Marina Satti) (singing)	Μαρίνα Σάττι (Marina Satti)
Hebrew	1989	1995-1996	2000	2008	2023	שלומית אהרון (Shlomit Aharon)	רמה מסינגר (Rama Messinger)	רמה מסינגר (Rama Messinger)	לימור שפירא (Limor Shapira)	Noa Klein
Hebrew	1989	2011	2000	2008	2023	שלומית אהרון (Shlomit Aharon)	שלומית אהרון (Meshi Kleinstein)	רמה מסינגר (Rama Messinger)	לימור שפירא (Limor Shapira)	Noa Klein
Hindi	2011	—N/a			2023	प्राची सावे साठी (Prachi Save Saathi) (speaking)	—N/a	प्राची सावे साठी (Prachi Save Saathi) (speaking)		Natasha Chungath (speaking)
Hindi	2011	—N/a			2023	চান্দ্রেয়ী ভট্টাচার্য (Chandreyee Bhattacharya (singing)	—N/a	—N/a		Arunaja Nalinakshan (singing)
Hungarian	1998	1995	2000	2008	2023	Oszvald Marika			Vágó Bernadett	Gigi Radics
Icelandic	1998	1996-1997	2000	2008	Not dubbed	Valgerður Guðnadóttir				Not dubbed
Indonesian	1991	1996-1997	2003	2014	Not dubbed	Hana Pertiwi	—N/a	Beatrix Renita	Maria Cicilia	Not dubbed
Italian	1989	1993-1995	2000	2008	2023	Simona Patitucci	Paola Valentini (speaking)			Sara Labidi (speaking)
Italian	1989	1993-1995	2000	2008	2023	Simona Patitucci	Tanaquilla Leonardi (singing)	Renata Fusco (singing)	Giulia Luzi (singing)	Yana C (singing)
Japanese	1991	1992-1994	2000	2008	2023	すずきまゆみ (Suzuki Mayumi)				豊原江理佳 (Toyohara Erika)
Japanese	1997	1992-1994	2000	2008	2023	すずきまゆみ (Suzuki Mayumi)				豊原江理佳 (Toyohara Erika)
Kazakh	2021	Not dubbed	2021	2023	Not dubbed	Шехназа Қызыханова (Şehnaza Qyzyhanova)	Not dubbed	Шехназа Қызыханова (Şehnaza Qyzyhanova)		Not dubbed
Korean	1991	1996-1998	2000	2008	2023	김수경 (Kim Su-gyeong) (speaking)	김수경 (Kim Su-gyeong) (speaking from season 1, episode 5 to season 3, episode 8)	김수경 (Kim Su-gyeong) (speaking)		Danielle Marsh
Korean	1991	1996-1998	2000	2008	2023	손영진 (Son Yeong-jin) (singing)	방주란 (Bang Ju-ran) (singing; speaking voice from season 1 episodes 1–4)	방주란 (Bang Ju-ran) (singing)	양꽃님 (Yang Kkot-nim) (singing)	Danielle Marsh
Malay	2010	—N/a			Not dubbed	—N/a	—N/a	—N/a		Not dubbed
Malay	2010	—N/a			Not dubbed	—N/a	Xema Suhaimi (singing "Sing a New Song")	—N/a		Not dubbed
Norwegian	1989	1992-1994	2000	2008	2023	Sissel Kyrkjebø	Guri Schanke			Morgan Brit Knaplund
Polish	1998	1995	2000	2008	2023	Beata Jankowska-Tzimas		Beata Jankowska-Tzimas		Sara James
Polish	1998	1996	2000	2008	2023	Beata Jankowska-Tzimas		Beata Jankowska-Tzimas		Sara James
Polish	1998	2007	2000	2008	2023	Beata Jankowska-Tzimas	Katarzyna Łaska	Beata Jankowska-Tzimas		Sara James
Portuguese (Brazil)	1990	1993-1994	2000	2008	2023	Marisa Leal (speaking)	Marisa Leal (speaking)		Marisa Leal (speaking)	Laura Castro
Portuguese (Brazil)	1990	1993-1994	2000	2008	2023	Gabriela Ferreira (singing)	Marisa Leal (speaking)		Marisa Leal (speaking)	Laura Castro
Portuguese (Brazil)	1998	1993-1994	2000	2008	2023	Marisa Leal (speaking)	Kiara Sasso (singing)		Marisa Leal (speaking)	Laura Castro
Portuguese (Brazil)	1998	1993-1994	2000	2008	2023	Kiara Sasso (singing)	Kiara Sasso (singing)		Marisa Leal (speaking)	Laura Castro
Portuguese (Portugal)	1998	2005	2000	2008	2023	Mila Belo (speaking)				Soraia Tavares
Portuguese (Portugal)	1998	2005	2000	2008	2023	Anabela Braz Pires (singing)				Soraia Tavares
Romanian	2005	—N/a	2015	2008	2023	Lara Ionescu (speaking)	Maria Răducanu	—N/a	Lara Ionescu (speaking)	Ana Stănciulescu
Romanian	2005	—N/a	2015	2008	2023	Maria Răducanu (singing)	Maria Răducanu	Maria Răducanu (singing)		Ana Stănciulescu
Russian	2006	—N/a	2013	2008	2023	Светлана Светикова (Svetlana Svetikova)		Фролова, Екатерина (Yekaterina Frolova)	Светлана Светикова (Svetlana Svetikova)	Дильнура Биржанова (Dil'nura Birzhanova)
Serbian	Not dubbed	2008	Not dubbed		2023	Not dubbed	Наташа Балог (Nataša Balog)	Not dubbed		Ирина Арсенијевићг (Irina Arsenijević)
Serbian	Not dubbed	2008	Not dubbed		2023	Not dubbed	Jodi Benson (singing, original version)	Not dubbed		Ирина Арсенијевићг (Irina Arsenijević)
Slovak	2013	2012	2014		2023	Zuzana Dvořáková Šťastná	Miroslava Drínová	Zuzana Dvořáková Šťastná		
Slovene	Not dubbed	1996	Not dubbed		2023	Not dubbed	—N/a	Not dubbed		
Spanish (Latin America)	1989	1992-1994	2000	2008	2023	Gabriela León (speaking)	Rocío Robledo (speaking, season 1)	Cony Madera (speaking)	Cony Madera	Yatzil Aguirre
Spanish (Latin America)	1989	1992-1994	2000	2008	2023	Gabriela León (speaking)	Erika Robledo (speaking, seasons 2–3)	Cony Madera (speaking)	Cony Madera	Yatzil Aguirre
Spanish (Latin America)	1989	1992-1994	2000	2008	2023	Isela Sotelo (singing)			Cony Madera	Yatzil Aguirre
Spanish (Spain)	1998	2002	Not dubbed	2008	2023	Graciela Molina (speaking)		Not dubbed	Cristina Yuste Álvarez (speaking)	Alicia Valadés (speaking)
Spanish (Spain)	1998	2002	Not dubbed	2008	2023	María Caneda (singing)		Not dubbed	Isabel Malavia (singing)	Mirela (singing)
Swedish	1989	1995	2000	2008	2023	Sissel Kyrkjebø	Johanna Ljungberg (speaking and singing "Just A Little love", "Edge of the Sea" & "Harmony")	Myrra Malmberg		Joanné Nugas
Swedish	1989	1995	2000	2008	2023	Sissel Kyrkjebø	Liza Öhman (singing "Sing A New Song")	Myrra Malmberg		Joanné Nugas
Swedish	1989	1995	2000	2008	2023	Sissel Kyrkjebø	Heléne Lundström (singing "Daring To Dance" & "Never Give Up")	Myrra Malmberg		Joanné Nugas
Tamil	2011	Not dubbed	—N/a		Not dubbed	—N/a	Not dubbed	—N/a		Not dubbed
Tamil	2011	Not dubbed	—N/a		Not dubbed	চান্দ্রেয়ী ভট্টাচার্য (Chandreyee Bhattacharya (singing)	Not dubbed	—N/a		Not dubbed
Telugu	—N/a	Not dubbed			Not dubbed	—N/a	Not dubbed			Not dubbed
Thai	1991	1999	2000	2008	2023	Martina Sprangers	จันทร์จิรา นิ่มพิทักษ์พงศ์ (Chanchira Nimphithakphong)			Bowkylion
Thai	1998	1999	2000	2008	2023	จันทร์จิรา นิ่มพิทักษ์พงศ์ (Chanchira Nimphithakphong)	จันทร์จิรา นิ่มพิทักษ์พงศ์ (Chanchira Nimphithakphong)			Bowkylion
Turkish	1998	1999	2000	2008	2023	Berna Terzi Erol (speaking)				Selen Severcan
Turkish	1998	1999	2000	2008	2023	Şebnem Ferah (singing)	Tülay Uyar (singing)			Selen Severcan
Ukrainian	2013	2011	2016		2023	Ліза Курбанмагомедова (Liza Kurbanmahomedova)				Єлизавета Мастаєва (Elyzaveta Mastaieva)
Vietnamese	2019	—N/a	Not dubbed		2023	Hồng Thoa (speaking)	—N/a	Not dubbed		Nguyễn Duyên Quỳnh
Vietnamese	2019	—N/a	Not dubbed		2023	Nguyễn Duyên Quỳnh (singing)	—N/a	Not dubbed		Nguyễn Duyên Quỳnh

== In other media ==
=== Tie-in music albums ===
In addition to the film's official soundtrack, two original music albums were released by Walt Disney Records as part of the franchise: Sebastian from The Little Mermaid (1990) and The Little Mermaid: Songs from the Sea (1992). The former is a cover album mainly focusing on Samuel E. Wright as Sebastian, with Jodi Benson as Ariel providing supporting vocals, while the latter is a concept album of original songs that depict a day in Ariel's life under the sea.

=== Printed media ===
Ariel appears in a number of printed media that have been released as part of the franchise. A series of twelve prequel novels were published in 1994 by Disney Press, following young Ariel's adventures living under the sea with her sisters and father. The titles are: Green-Eyed Pearl and Nefazia Visits the Palace by Suzanne Weyn; Reflections of Arsulu and The Same Old Song by Marilyn Kaye; Arista's New Boyfriend and Ariel the Spy by M. J. Carr; King Triton, Beware!, The Haunted Palace and The Boyfriend Mix-Up by Katherine Applegate; The Practical-Joke War by Stephanie St. Pierre; The Dolphins of Coral Cove by K. S. Rodriguez; and Alana's Secret Friend by Jess Christopher.

In 1992, Disney Comics released a four-issue The Little Mermaid Limited Series comic book series. In 1994 Marvel Comics released its own title, Disney's The Little Mermaid, which ran for twelve issues.

Ariel appears as a minor character in the 2016 young adult novel Poor Unfortunate Soul: A Tale of the Sea Witch by Serena Valentino, which is part of a Disney Villains series and is mainly about Ursula the Sea Witch. She is also a main character in the 2018 young adult novel Part of Your World by Liz Braswell, which is part of a Disney Twisted Tales series and is set in an alternate universe where Ariel was unable to stop Ursula's wedding to Eric.

=== Disney Princess ===
In 2000, Ariel became an official member of the newly launched Disney Princess line, an umbrella franchise that includes various Disney princesses under its banner. Ariel is one of the original 8 characters that were included at the franchise's launch. The franchise is directed at young girls and covers a wide variety of merchandise, including but not limited to magazines, music albums, toys, video games, clothes, and stationery.

This franchise includes illustrated novels starring the various princesses, two of which are about Ariel: The Birthday Surprise and The Shimmering Star Necklace. Both novels are written by Gail Herman, and contain original stories about Ariel's life as a human and Eric's wife, but still maintaining close relationships with her father and sisters under the sea. The franchise also includes illustrated short stories about Ariel's life as a human, such as Ariel and the Aquamarine Jewel, Ariel's Dolphin Adventure, and Ariel's Royal Wedding.

Jodi Benson provides Ariel's voice for her appearances in the Disney Princess music albums, DVDs, and video games. The first original song released for this franchise is "If You Can Dream", which featured Cinderella, Aurora, Ariel, Belle, Pocahontas, Jasmine and Mulan singing together. Other original songs that feature Ariel are "I Just Love Getting Dressed for Tea", "Manners and Etiquette", "The Princess Dance" and "Happy Birthday, Princess" from Disney Princess Tea Party (2005); "Christmas Is Coming!", "Christmas in the Ocean", "Ariel's Christmas Island" and "The Twelve Days of Christmas" from Disney Princess Christmas Album (2009); and "Ariel's Sing-Along Sea Song: the Crab Song" from Disney Princess Party (2010).

=== Broadway musical ===
Sierra Boggess as Ariel in the stage musical

Ariel appears in the Broadway adaptation of the 1989 film, which ran at the Lunt-Fontanne Theatre with previews from November 3, 2007, leading to opening night on January 10, 2008. This original production closed on August 30, 2009, but other US and international productions have followed since. The character of Ariel for the stage adaptation was originated by Sierra Boggess, who received a nomination for the Drama Desk Award for Outstanding Actress in a Musical for her performance. Jodi Benson, the original voice actress for Ariel, attended the musical's opening night.

In order to portray the characters underwater, the actors wore Heelys wheeled footwear, which simulate the gliding action of swimming creatures. The actors playing Ariel and the other merfolk had wire-frame tails attached to their hips. Subsequent productions feature different designs for Ariel and the merfolk; the Dutch and Japanese productions use wirework and aerial stunts to create the illusion of underwater swimming.

=== Disney Parks ===
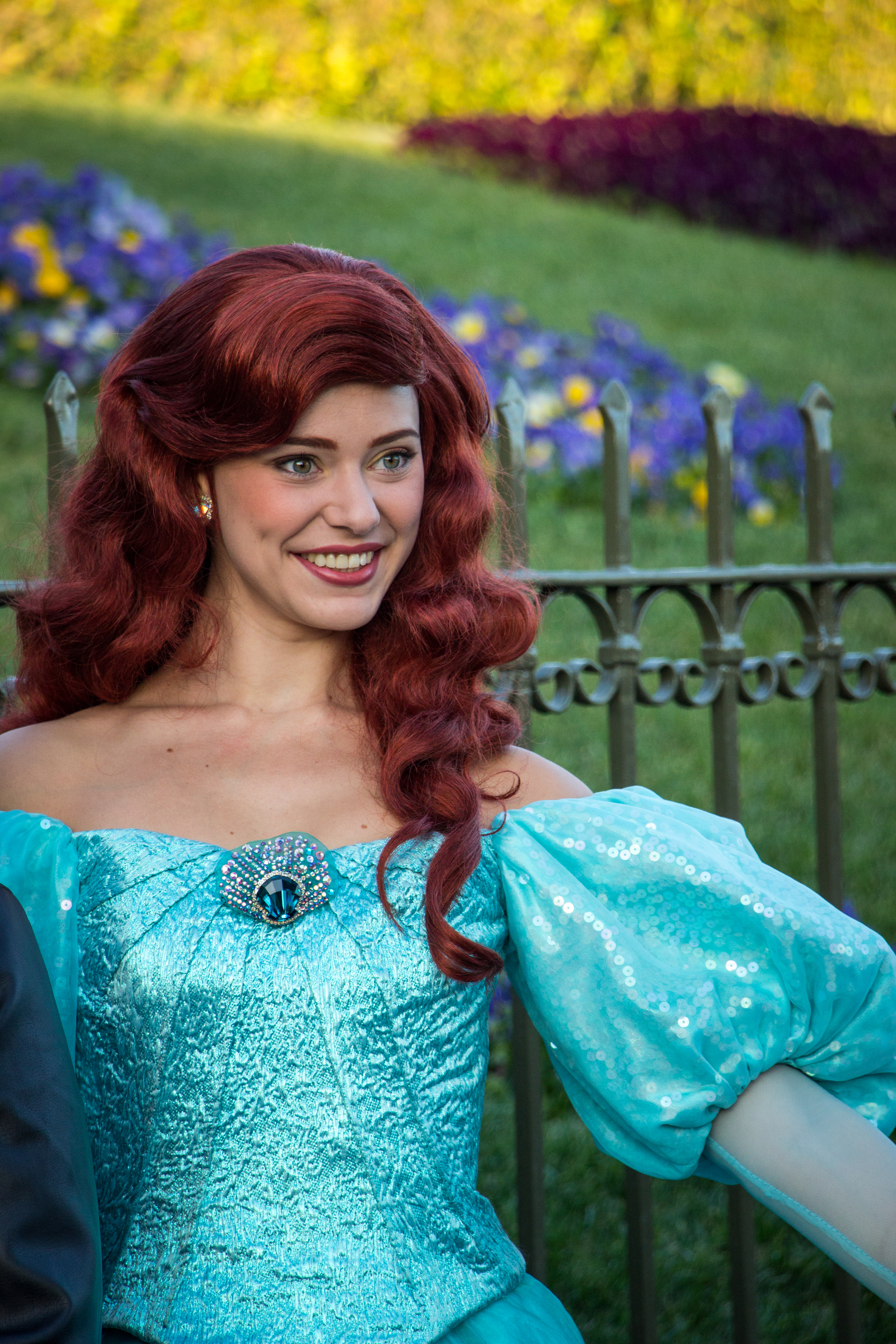
Ariel, as she appears in the Disney Parks.

Ariel makes regular appearances in the Walt Disney Parks and Resorts, having a special location called Ariel's Grotto at most of them. The original Ariel's Grotto was torn down at Walt Disney World's Magic Kingdom owing to the Fantasyland expansion. "The Little Mermaid" mini-land can be found in the Magic Kingdom's New Fantasyland. It includes a replica of Prince Eric's Castle, a dark ride called Ariel's Undersea Adventure, a market called "Prince Eric's Village Market", and the new location of Ariel's meeting grotto. She has a major role in Mickey's PhilharMagic and stars in her own live stage shows at Disney's Hollywood Studios and Tokyo DisneySea. A dark ride based on the film was designed for Disneyland Paris but never built. A re-designed version of the attraction, called Ariel's Undersea Adventure, was built as part of the major expansion for Disney California Adventure Park. She also has her own hotel at the Disney's Art of Animation Resort. There is a land in Tokyo DisneySea titled "Mermaid Lagoon". It features many rides and attractions themed around the Little Mermaid. A clone of the dark ride found in Disney California Adventure Park and Magic Kingdom was to be a part of Fantasyland in Hong Kong Disneyland but was never built. A clone of the dark ride was also supposed to be in Tokyo DisneySea but was canceled due to budget reasons. In May 2023, the version of Ariel from the live-action film adaptation began making appearances at the Disney Parks.

=== Other films ===
==== Ralph Breaks the Internet ====
Ariel appears in Ralph Breaks the Internet, with Jodi Benson reprising the role.

==== Live-action film adaptation ====
In Disney's 2023 live-action remake of The Little Mermaid, Ariel was played by Halle Bailey.

In May 2016, Deadline Hollywood reported that Disney was in early development for a live-action adaptation of the film. In 2019, Halle Bailey was cast in the starring role as Ariel. Criticism of the casting after the teaser trailer release became viral and elicited the hashtag #NotMyAriel. The film was released on May 26, 2023. Bailey's portrayal as Ariel was generally well received by critics with many of them considering her performance as the main highlight of film. (Note: Attributed to multiple references:)

=== Television ===
==== Little Mermaid's Island (cancelled TV series) ====
Not long after the film was released, Muppet creator Jim Henson proposed a live-action show based on the film, titled Little Mermaid's Island. Ariel was to be portrayed by Marietta DePrima, and she would interact with various puppet characters created by Jim Henson's Creature Shop. Two episodes of this series were filmed but not aired due to complications after Henson's death.

==== Once Upon a Time ====
An alternate version of Ariel appears in Once Upon a Time, portrayed by JoAnna Garcia.

==== Concert ====
In 2016 a stripped-down concert version of The Little Mermaid was staged at the Hollywood Bowl, featuring the songs from the film and four songs from the Broadway musical. Sara Bareilles performed the role of Ariel for the first two nights of the concert (June 4 and 5), while Jodi Benson, the original voice actress for Ariel, reprised her role for the June 6 performance.

==== The Little Mermaid Live! ====
In 2019 ABC aired a musical television special performed with a live audience, where footage of the 1989 film was interwoven with live musical performances of songs from the film and Broadway stage musical. Auliʻi Cravalho performed as Ariel in this production, and Jodi Benson introduced the show.

==== Lego Disney Princess specials ====
Ariel appears as one of the main characters in Lego's animated special Lego Disney Princess: The Castle Quest, released on Disney+ on August 18, 2023. She also appears in the 2025 sequel, Lego Disney Princess: Villains Unite.

==== Ariel ====
A young Ariel, bearing an appearance and design based on the portrayal of the character in the 2023 film, but with an artstyle that more closely resembles the aesthetic of the original 1989 animated film, is the titular protagonist of the Disney Junior animated series Ariel, released in 2024. Ariel is voiced by Mykal-Michelle Harris.

==== Sofia the First ====
It was announced in May 2026 that Ariel will appear in the sequel series to Sofia the First, entitled Sofia the First: Royal Magic, with Ariel providing "wisdom and guidance" with the protagonist, Sofia.

=== Video games ===
Ariel appears in various video games based on the films, including the two adaptations of the first film (one for NES and Game Boy, known as The Little Mermaid, and one for Sega consoles called Ariel the Little Mermaid).

She appears in some installments of the Kingdom Hearts series. In Kingdom Hearts (2002), Ariel appears in the Atlantica world, which is themed after The Little Mermaid and features an original storyline that involves Ariel and Sora battling Ursula and the Heartless. Ariel also appears in Kingdom Hearts II (2005), which loosely adapts the story of the 1989 film, and Kingdom Hearts III (2019) as an assist character for Sora.

== Reception and legacy ==
Ariel has received mixed reception from critics. Upon the film’s release, the character was praised by critics as a modern heroine, although she also faced some criticism. Roger Ebert of the Chicago Sun-Times praised the character, writing that "Ariel is a fully realized female character who thinks and acts independently, even rebelliously, instead of hanging around passively while the fates decide her destiny." James Bernardelli of Reelviews wrote that Ariel can be viewed as a template for future Disney heroes and heroines. He also praised Jodi Benson's vocal performance for the character. In an article for Empire, Levi Buchanan stated that Ariel is "powerful and self-reliant." Janet Maslin of The New York Times complimented Ariel, stating that "teenagers will appreciate the story's rebellious heroine" and went on to praise Ariel's wit. Josh Tyler of Cinema Blend wrote favorably about Ariel, although he believed that the character was eroticized, stating "The scene where Ursula rips out her throat and gives her extremely naked parts below the waist is almost titillating, though I'm sure to little kids it seems entirely innocent." Similarly, reviewer John Puccio said that "Ariel is perhaps the sexiest-looking animated character the Disney artists have ever drawn." In his review of Ariel's Beginning, James Plath of DVD Town wrote, "For little girls, Ariel is one of the most beloved of Disney princesses, and she holds a warm place in the hearts of parents as well." Rory Aronsky of Film Threat praised Jodi Benson's vocal performance in Ariel's Beginning, writing that "Benson adds more to the appeal of Ariel for older fans, and younger girls just learning about her, as well as generations not born yet who will undoubtedly become attached to her, ensuring the continued existence of the franchise."

In their review of The Little Mermaid, the staff of TV Guide wrote that Ariel resembled "a big-haired, denatured Barbie doll, despite her hourglass figure and skimpy seashell brassiere." Tamara Weston of Time wrote that while Ariel is less passive and more strong-willed than her predecessors, she still "gives up her voice to be with a man" who comes to her rescue at the film's climax. Hal Hinson of The Washington Post wrote that it would be difficult for children to relate to Ariel's "feelings of disenchantment and longing for another world" and that she "doesn't have much personality." However, he also wrote a positive statement about Ariel, saying it was "refreshing ... to see a heroine who has some sense of what she wants and the resources to go after it." Nell Minow of Common Sense Media had a mixed view of Ariel, praising her for being "adventuresome, rebellious, and brave," but also criticizing that she "gives up everything – her family, her home, her voice – for love, even though her trust in the sea witch puts everyone she loves in danger." Daphne Lee of The Star called Ariel "annoying" and went on to state that she "is a silly girl who gives up her voice and her family for a man she knows next to nothing about."

It was largely the results of these initial negative reviews regarding Ariel, that resulted in then-Disney Animation chairman Jeffrey Katzenberg deciding to add in a "feminist twist" to the next Disney fairy tale adaptation, Beauty and the Beast, and by extension make the film's female protagonist, Belle, into a feminist, as well as hire Linda Woolverton to act as the main screenwriter for the film. Despite her mixed critical reception, Ariel remains popular with audiences and is considered one of Disney's most iconic and beloved animated characters, with her specific color combination of red hair, lavender seashells, and green tail making her distinctly identifiable. An IMDb poll showed Ariel to be the second most alluring animated character after Jessica Rabbit. In August 2011, Jodi Benson was honored as a Disney Legend for her work as Ariel and her other projects at Disney. Although Belle is still often regarded and praised as Disney's first true feminist princess, fans and critics state that Ariel is because of her desire for independence, as well as being the first Disney princess to save her prince's life in her film.

A bi-annual convention called ArielCon is dedicated to the character. Ariel is an official "ambassador" for the "Keep Our Oceans Clean" campaign by Environmental Defense, The National Maritime Sanctuary, and The National Oceanic and Atmospheric Administration. From 2007 onwards, Disney launched an advertising campaign called Disney Dreams Portraits featuring celebrities dressed up as various Disney characters and photographed Annie Leibovitz; Julianne Moore was photographed as Ariel for this campaign.

"Hipster Ariel" has become a popular internet meme, utilizing a screenshot of Ariel with photoshopped glasses accompanied by a humorous caption. The popularity of the Hipster Ariel meme also led Funko to produce a line of Funko Pop figures based on the Hipster Disney Princess meme. Ariel's distinct appearance makes her the subject of "look-alike" events and competitions.
