= Bored of the Rings (disambiguation) =

Bored of the Rings is a 1969 Harvard Lampoon parody of Lord of the Rings.

Bored of the Rings may also refer to:

- Bored of the Rings (video game), text adventure game
- "Bored of the Rings", episode of The Sarah Silverman Program
- "Bored of the Rings", episode of The Hughleys
