= List of The Hughleys episodes =

This is a list of the 89 episodes of the American ABC/UPN sitcom, The Hughleys.

== Series overview ==
Season	Episodes	Originally released		
Season	Episodes	First released	Last released	Network
1	23	September 22, 1998	May 11, 1999	ABC
2	22	September 24, 1999	April 28, 2000	ABC
3	22	September 11, 2000	May 14, 2001	UPN
4	22	September 3, 2001	May 20, 2002	UPN

== Episodes ==
=== Season 1 (1998–99) ===
No. overall	No. in season	Title	Directed by	Written by	Original release date	Prod. code	Viewers (millions)
1	1	"Pilot"	Andy Cadiff	D.L. Hughley & Matt Wickline	September 22, 1998	2-98-179	15.99
In the series premiere, Darryl Hughley and his family are getting settled into their new home in the L.A. suburbs, but Darryl keeps seeing racism where there is none and lets his best friend Milsap scare him into thinking that he's on the "slippery slope" to losing his blackness.
2	2	"Carpool"	Matthew Diamond	Kim C. Friese	September 29, 1998	2-98-102	13.71
Yvonne asks Darryl to carpool for a few days, but things do not work out when the other kids' moms vote him out the day before Yvonne is to appear before city council.
3	3	"Lost in the Suburbs"	Brian K. Roberts	Matt Wickline	October 6, 1998	2-98-103	14.18
Darryl feels left out when Milsap hits it off with Dave and Yvonne becomes busy with Sally's baby shower.
4	4	"Class Clown"	Peter Bonerz	Eunetta T. Boone	October 13, 1998	2-98-105	12.27
When Darryl finds out that Michael is the popular class clown, he worries about his academic future.
5	5	"Keeping Romance Alive"	Peter Bonerz	D.L. Hughley & Matt Wickline	October 20, 1998	2-98-104	12.12
Darryl and Yvonne are having trouble finding time alone together.
6	6	"Rich Kids Bad, Poor Kids Good"	Michael Lessac	Billy Van Zandt & Jane Milmore	October 27, 1998	2-98-101	12.96
Darryl is worried that his kids are growing up spoiled, so he decides to show them what life is like to grow up poor.
7	7	"Baby Fever"	Steve Zuckerman	Billy Van Zandt & Jane Milmore	November 3, 1998	2-98-108	12.22
Dave's not around when Sally goes into labor; the Hughleys and Milsap come to her rescue. Darryl overhears a conversation between Yvonne and a nurse and thinks that Yvonne might be pregnant.
8	8	"Soccer"	Peter Bonerz	John Bowman	November 10, 1998	2-98-106	13.32
Darryl is not psyched when Yvonne signs him up to coach Michael's suburban soccer team.
9	9	"Sydney"	Steve Zuckerman	Bootsie	November 17, 1998	2-98-107	11.55
Darryl is neglecting Sydney, and realizes that he has to do something drastic when Sydney asks Milsap to escort her to her school's "Father–Daughter" dance.
10	10	"Thanksgiving"	Steve Zuckerman	D.L. Hughley & Matt Wickline	November 24, 1998	2-98-109	14.24
Yvonne wants to impress Darryl's hard-to-please relatives by cooking Thanksgiving dinner all by herself. Meanwhile, Darryl's family visits for the first time.
11	11	"I'm Shrinking"	Gil Junger	Kim C. Friese	December 8, 1998	2-98-110	12.65
Darryl starts to obsess about losing everything.
12	12	"A Multi-Culti Christmas"	Gil Junger	Story by : Eunetta T. Boone; Teleplay by : Eunetta T. Boone & Stacy A. Littlejohn	December 15, 1998	2-98-111	12.05
Darryl takes matters into his own hands after becoming agitated with the school's very PC Christmas pageant.
13	13	"Reliving Single"	Steve Zuckerman	Billy Van Zandt & Jane Milmore	January 5, 1999	2-98-112	14.86
The couples in the suburbs are worried about Milsap's single status and try to set him up. Meanwhile, Michael tries his hand at impressing his new babysitter.
14	14	"I Ain't Heavy, I'm Your Father"	Peter Bonerz	Stacy A. Littlejohn & Myles Avery Mapp	January 12, 1999	2-98-113	11.99
Darryl goes camping with the kids to prove that he's fun.
15	15	"Why Can't We Be Friends?"	Peter Bonerz	D.L. Hughley & Matt Wickline	February 2, 1999	2-98-114	12.87
Darryl questions his friendship with Dave after meeting one of Dave's friends who is a racist.
16	16	"Dog Eat Dog"	Steve Zuckerman	Kim C. Friese	February 9, 1999	2-98-116	11.82
Darryl's neighbor (Taylor Negron) takes him to court after he claims the family's stray dog attacked him. While Darryl tries to defend himself, his neighbor has the legal counsel of Johnnie Cochran, which makes Darryl fear for the outcome of the case.
17	17	"Storm o' the Century"	Steve Zuckerman	Bootsie & Myles Avery Mapp	February 16, 1999	2-98-115	12.86
Darryl ruins the fun for everyone when the Hughleys and the Rogerses stop at a haunted hotel.
18	18	"I Do, I Do, Again: Part 1"	Mark Cendrowski	Eunetta T. Boone	February 23, 1999	2-98-117	14.84
Darryl asks Yvonne to marry him again, now that he can afford a big wedding, but it looks like her father might ruin the ceremony.
19	19	"I Do, I Do, Again: Part 2"	Brian K. Roberts	Matt Wickline & Eunetta T. Boone	March 2, 1999	2-98-118	14.35
Yvonne threatens to call off the wedding if Darryl and her father do not at least pretend to get along with each other.
20	20	"G.E.D."	Brian K. Roberts	Story by : D.L. Hughley; Teleplay by : Bootsie & Stacy A. Littlejohn	March 16, 1999	2-98-119	12.67
When Michael tells his family that he doesn't plan on going to high school, Darryl tries to set an example by going back to school for his G.E.D.
21	21	"Clan of the Cave Bear"	Brian K. Roberts	D.L. Hughley & Matt Wickline	April 6, 1999	2-98-120	10.74
Yvonne takes a job doing fundraising at a local hospital.
22	22	"Jungle Gym Fever"	Steve Zuckerman	John Bowman & Myles Avery Mapp	May 4, 1999	2-98-122	10.39
Darryl becomes upset when Sydney's first crush is on a white boy.
23	23	"Up on the Roof"	Mark Cendrowski	John D. Beck & Ron Hart	May 11, 1999	2-98-121	10.30
Milsap accepts another job when Darryl refuses to give him what he deserves.

=== Season 2 (1999–2000) ===
No. overall	No. in season	Title	Directed by	Written by	Original release date	Prod. code	Viewers (millions)
24	1	"Young Guns"	Mark Cendrowski	D.L. Hughley & Matt Wickline	September 24, 1999	2-99-201	8.28
The school that the Hughleys' and Rogers' kids attend is considering putting in metal detectors because kids have been caught bringing guns to school. Both Dave and Darryl are gun owners, and insist on their rights to bear arms. Yvonne tries to get Darryl to get rid of his gun, which he refuses to do until Michael is checking it out one night, drops it, and it accidentally goes off and breaks a window.
25	2	"Milsap Moves Up"	Mark Cendrowski	Kim C. Friese	October 1, 1999	2-99-202	7.17
Darryl gets a reputation around work as giving good love advice. When Milsap starts to despair about his long-distance relationship with Regina, Darryl tells him to make a big gesture. Milsap buys a huge house very near the Hughleys (of which Darryl is extremely jealous), and proposes to Regina, who says no.
26	3	"Honey, I Beat the Kids"	Steve Zuckerman	Billy Van Zandt & Jane Milmore	October 8, 1999	2-99-203	8.99
Darryl gives Michael a spanking for misbehaving, but it's Darryl who learns a lesson about raising children, and that the way he grew up is not necessarily the best way.
27	4	"Sap and the Star"	Steve Zuckerman	John D. Beck & Ron Hart	October 15, 1999	2-99-205	9.27
Milsap starts dating a movie star (guest star Tyra Banks), and Darryl gets so caught up in the Hollywood lifestyle that he forgets Yvonne's birthday. To make up for his gaffe, Darryl sets up a romantic night of tango dancing for himself and his wife. Michael keeps trying to steal Milsap's girlfriend.
28	5	"Help a Brother Out"	Brian K. Roberts	Bootsie	October 22, 1999	2-99-207	7.81
Darryl's big brother Jojo comes to town with a crazy T-shirt scheme and an excuse for everything, usually involving the white man keeping him down. Darryl tries to get Jojo to get a real job, but Jojo working at Darryl's company doesn't work out when Jojo draws up a bogus contract with a huge client. Finally Darryl has it out with Jojo, telling him he can't always blame someone else for his problems, and Jojo, initially upset, finally listens and gets a job doing sales for the airline their father used to work for.
29	6	"The Curse of the Coyote Man"	Steve Zuckerman	Story by : Erik Marino; Teleplay by : John D. Beck & Ron Hart	October 29, 1999	2-99-206	10.50
Darryl, Milsap and Dave try to scare Michael and Sydney by telling them stories of the Coyote Man and then scaring them while they're trick-or-treating. They scare the wrong kids, and then cut through the woods to catch up with the Hughley kids. Cops come to the Hughley house with a video tape and a red stained sweat shirt. In a "Blair Witch" style documentary, the three men get lost and separated in the woods, and then Darryl is apparently attacked by Coyote Man. When the lights go out and a furry beast crashes into the house, everyone is terrified. It turns out that Darryl paid the real Coyote Man to scare his family.
30	7	"Roots: Part 1"	Brian K. Roberts	D.L. Hughley & Matt Wickline	November 5, 1999	2-99-208	8.97
At a big family Thanksgiving, Darryl learns that the man he always thought was his father actually is not, and his entire family has been lying to him his whole life.
31	8	"Roots: Part 2"	Brian K. Roberts	Story by : D.L. Hughley; Teleplay by : Stacy A. Littlejohn	November 12, 1999	2-99-209	10.26
Darryl is incredibly upset by the news that Henry is not his biological father. Darryl's mother tells him about Jerry Rose (Billy Dee Williams), his real father, and how he took off shortly after Darryl was born. Henry tells Yvonne where to find Jerry Rose, and Yvonne packs up Darryl and takes him to Oakland, where Jerry has a restaurant. Jerry is incredibly excited to meet Darryl, and wants to be a part of his life. Jerry tells Darryl that he once sent $35,000 to Hattie Mae, but Henry sent the check back with a letter saying he did not want to accept payment for raising "his" sons. Darryl realizes that Henry really is his "real" father even if he is not his biological father, and goes back to L.A. and has a heart-to-heart with him.
32	9	"Daddy's Going to Hell"	Steve Zuckerman	Eunetta T. Boone	December 3, 1999	2-99-204	8.26
Darryl does not go to church because he feels that it's full of gossiping hypocrites and is always trying to get money out of him. He's honored when Dave and Sally ask him to be Gretchen's godfather, but then gets all bent out of shape when he finds out the whole christening thing costs $200. He backs out, and then gets into a car accident. A man in a white suit who looks suspiciously like Isaac Hayes gives him a new appreciation for church, and he gets to the christening just in time to take his place as godfather.
33	10	"I Love You, You're Fired"	Mark Cendrowski	John Bowman & Matt Wickline	December 10, 1999	2-99-210	7.75
Yvonne fills in when Darryl's assistant quits, but their fabulous working relationship quickly deteriorates and Darryl ends up having to fire her. Yvonne hires Darryl's mother as her replacement for revenge.
34	11	"Miracle on 135th and Avalon"	Peter Bonerz	John D. Beck & Ron Hart	December 17, 1999	2-99-211	8.69
Darryl tells Sydney and Michael a Christmas story to thwart their disbelief in Santa Claus, and it turns out that Darryl himself still believes in Santa.
35	12	"Seoul Brother Next Door"	Steve Zuckerman	Myles Avery Mapp	January 7, 2000	2-99-212	9.19
Darryl and his Korean neighbor (Pat Morita) feud over their differences, but then finally realize that they do have some things in common.
36	13	"Death Takes a Three Day Holiday"	Mark Cendrowski	Billy Van Zandt & Jane Milmore	January 21, 2000	2-99-213	10.02
When a neighbor dies at a young age and his widow is not left with enough life insurance, Yvonne becomes concerned about Darryl's life insurance situation, and convinces him to take the physical to get more life insurance even though he's scared of doctors. He gets a check up, and the doctor calls his house with test results, leaving a garbled message with Michael that has Darryl convinced he's dying. Darryl tries to live his last days as fully as possible, and after not sleeping for 37 hours he passes out from exhaustion. He wakes up and his doctor tells him that he's actually fine. It turns out that the doctor does not treat many black patients — in fact, Darryl's only his second — and he overreacted to a slight imbalance in Darryl's blood that's actually normal for black men.
37	14	"So What Do You Do, Mrs. Hughley?"	Mark Cendrowski	Al Sonja L. Rice	January 28, 2000	2-99-214	9.55
At a charity auction, Yvonne meets a number of working mothers who are condescending when they find out Yvonne is a stay at home mom, but her gift-basket that she donates sells for a lot of money. Yvonne decides to start a gift-basket business to prove she too can do it all and starts to work herself to the bone. Yvonne feels badly when Sydney gets a D on a math test, Michael has a new friend she has not even met, Darryl has to take Sydney to her Buttercup Girls meeting, and Michael starts gaining weight from Jessie Mae's butter-heavy cooking. She realizes she's doing something she hates and ignoring something she loves to prove something to people she does not care about, so she quits.
38	15	"Lies My Valentine Told Me"	Steve Zuckerman	D.L. Hughley & Matt Wickline	February 11, 2000	2-99-216	9.28
It turns out that both the Hughleys and the Rogerses have been keeping secrets from each other, and the others' suspicions cause the two couples to have a terrible Valentine's Day. Darryl bought an expensive watch, Yvonne got her own credit card, Dave is keeping a motorcycle at Milsap's, and Sally bought a whole bunch of new clothes. Meanwhile, the Hughley kids and their friend Ronnie are playing with exotic animals like bats and pythons in the Hughleys' home.
39	16	"Two Jacks and a Beanstalk"	Matt Wickline	Story by : Matt Wickline; Teleplay by : Billy Van Zandt & Jane Milmore	February 25, 2000	2-99-217	9.60
Way back in the middle ages, Jack Sr. (D.L. Hughley) works for meager wages. With his hungry, hovel-dwelling brood, they have little to do but complain about food. When Jack Jr. (Dee Jay Daniels) sells their cow for beans, his father chides him for their lack of means. But the legumes, of course, are the magic kind, so the two Jacks climb the sprouting vine. In the clouds they search for untold wealth, to ensure a lifetime of happiness and health.
40	17	"She's a Brickhouse"	Mark Cendrowski	Eunetta T. Boone	March 3, 2000	2-99-215	9.42
Darryl's sexy new neighbor, Heather (guest star Cindy Margolis), causes a stir in the neighborhood, especially when he dreams she kisses him. Meanwhile, Michael & Sydney want a DVD player, so they work for Milsap to get paid to buy it.
41	18	"The Music Man"	Leonard R. Garner Jr.	Stacy A. Littlejohn	March 17, 2000	2-99-218	9.02
Mr. Ballard is fired from Sydney and Michael's school after Darryl encourages him to stand up for himself when the budget for his school musical is cut. Darryl hires him on at the vending company, but he brings productivity way down. So Darryl decides to go to the school superintendent to try to get Mr. Ballard his job back. He ends up striking a deal where Mr. Ballard can do his school musical if Darryl funds it. At the last minute, the superintendent sells all of the school's musical instruments, so Ballard puts on a take-off on "Stomp" called "Whomp," an all-percussion show using sports equipment and trash can lids. Everyone loves the show and pressures the superintendent into giving Ballard his job back.
42	19	"The Girl That I Married"	Mary Lou Belli	Bootsie	March 31, 2000	2-99-220	6.98
After Darryl teaches his son how to be a ladies' man, and Michael starts dating two women at the same time, Yvonne admits that she was dating someone else when she first started dating Darryl. Darryl, although he originally refuses to go to Yvonne's college reunion, now crashes it in order to hunt down her other boyfriend. He learns to have some confidence in his relationship with Yvonne, but still tackles both a Reverend and a Rabbi out of jealousy. Meanwhile, Sydney becomes friends with one of Michael's girlfriends and gets him busted.
43	20	"Body Double"	Skip Collector	Kim C. Friese	April 7, 2000	2-99-221	6.78
Yvonne's parents drop the family's hated Aunt Thelma off at the Hughley residence where she proceeds to die. Darryl goes with Yvonne's father to make funeral arrangements, and even though he also hated Aunt Thelma, he is horrified with how cheap his father-in-law is being. At the wake in the Hughleys' house, the family realizes that they have a strange white woman in the casket instead of Aunt Thelma, and the guys have to crash a confederate funeral to steal their hated Aunt's body back. The finally have a proper wake that Darryl pays for and the kids even find something good to say about the old woman.
44	21	"Love the One You're With"	Mark Cendrowski	Erik Marino	April 21, 2000	2-99-222	6.70
Darryl's parents haven't had sex in a month, so they head to a couples retreat for the weekend. Darryl thinks the couples retreat will ruin his parents' marriage, so he decides to follow them up there with Yvonne... and of course Dave and Sally come too. After Darryl's parents start threatening divorce, they rediscover their passion and spend most of the weekend in bed. Darryl, however, in the spirit of honesty and communication fostered by the retreat, tells Yvonne about some of his methods for not listening to her. Yvonne shoots back with some harsh honesty of her own and they have an all-out fight. They realize that their marriage has worked just fine for the last 15 years with them being honest about the things they like about each other, and just keeping quiet about everything else, so if it isn't broken they shouldn't fix it.
45	22	"The Thin Black Line"	Mark Cendrowski	Myles Avery Mapp	April 28, 2000	2-99-219	6.47
Yvonne's cousin makes a documentary of the Hughleys, making Darryl hyper-aware of the possibility that he is selling out by moving to the white suburbs. Sydney gets into a fight with a girl at school who calls her white. The Rogerses are made to feel that somehow they are racist.

=== Season 3 (2000–01) ===
No. overall	No. in season	Title	Directed by	Written by	Original release date	Prod. code	Viewers (millions)
46	1	"Design Flaws"	Mark Cendrowski	Bootsie	September 11, 2000	2-00-302	5.82
Yvonne convinces Darryl to hire a contractor to remodel the kitchen, but the man they select is also working on the Rogers' home. As a result, Dave and Sally are less than pleased, as the work on their home halts while the contractor busies himself at the Hughleys'. Darryl, too, is unhappy, as the contractor's plans expand to include the entire house — and, possibly Yvonne, and force both families to live in a tent together.
47	2	"Guess Who's Coming Out for Dinner?"	Mark Cendrowski	Kim C. Friese	September 18, 2000	2-00-301	4.58
Darryl is afraid that his "girl-hating" son Michael might be gay, suspicions that ultimately lead one of his neighbors to come out of the closet at a lively neighborhood get-together. Meanwhile, Mr. Park is named President of the Homeowners' Association, and can't wait to start handing out citations — especially to Darryl.
48	3	"We Got It Maid"	Mark Cendrowski	Stacy A. Littlejohn	September 25, 2000	2-00-303	4.83
When Yvonne goes back to work, she hires a maid to help around the house — but the housekeeper's personality mixed with Darryl's is a recipe for disaster. Meanwhile, Darryl asks Milsap to find a good band for his mother's retirement party.
49	4	"In the Bluff"	Brian K. Roberts	Myles Avery Mapp	October 2, 2000	2-00-304	3.97
Darryl decides to launch a Web site for Hughley Vending that features scantily clad women. When Yvonne learns about the idea, she's taken aback. Then, when she visits the business during a casting call, she becomes jealous of the pretty young women and, in an effort to get him to stop, informs Darryl that she wants to pose. But Darryl, believing that she really does want to pose, is afraid to say no.
50	5	"The Truth Shall Set Me Free"	Brian K. Roberts	Matt Ember	October 9, 2000	2-00-305	4.10
After firing one of his employees for incompetence, Darryl is shocked when he is sued for racial discrimination. While Darryl's friends try to convince the judge — and themselves — that Darryl isn't really a racist, his hopes of winning fade further when he discovers that the former employee has hired a world-famous lawyer (Johnnie Cochran). Note: This is Johnnie Cochran's second guest appearance, his first appearance in Season 1, Episode 16, where he was hired by Darryl's neighbor.
51	6	"Scary Hughley"	Mark Cendrowski	John D. Beck & Ron Hart	October 30, 2000	2-00-306	4.51
The Hughleys and the Rogerses decide to throw a joint party in their two houses for Halloween, but Darryl gets all competitive and decides he has to throw a better party than his neighbors. Darryl finds out that Crazy Larry, the appliance store owner, used to live in his house and died in the kitchen when he tried to get a bagel out of a toaster with a fork. Darryl, with the help of a talisman that unleashes dark evil, finds himself being haunted by the ghost of Crazy Larry, and he has to perform an exorcism on Yvonne. It turns out that Darryl's friends ganged up to pull a prank on him to teach him not to be so competitive.
52	7	"Rage Against the Machine"	Mark Cendrowski	Anne Parker	November 6, 2000	2-00-307	3.38
Darryl and Yvonne agree to let their home be a polling place for the Presidential election. Darryl's father is disgusted when he learns that his son doesn't vote. Dave drives Darryl nuts with his new favorite toy, a leafblower, that not only disturbs Darryl by making a racket, but blows leaves onto Darryl's property. Darryl fights the realization that he's a Republican, but his non-participation takes a U-turn when he learns that there's a measure to ban leafblowers on the ballot. Darryl's father is proud when Darryl gets thrown in jail trying to persuade voters to vote against leafblowers.
53	8	"Darryl's Victory Tour"	Steve Zuckerman	Jane Milmore & Billy Van Zandt	November 13, 2000	2-00-308	3.74
When an old friend comes to visit, Darryl and Yvonne recount when they first met at the Jackson Victory Tour concert at Dodger Stadium in the '80s, but the nostalgic trip proves bumpy when they learn that their recollections do not necessarily match. Absent: John Henton as Milsap
54	9	"Oh Thank Heaven for Seven-Eleven"	Steve Zuckerman	Todd R. Jones & Earl Richey Jones	November 20, 2000	2-00-309	3.71
On Thanksgiving, a fight between Darryl and a store clerk results in Darryl, his family, in-laws, Dave and Sally being stuck inside a mini-mart surrounded by the LAPD.
55	10	"His Park Is Worse Than His Bite"	Steve Zuckerman	John D. Beck & Ron Hart	November 27, 2000	2-00-310	3.63
Darryl and Mr. Park's feud gets so bad that Yvonne and the neighbors insist they call a truce. Mr. Park refuses to sign the treaty because Darryl is up one prank on him. He says he'll sign the treaty if Darryl does him the favor of watching his dog while he's away. Darryl gets talked into it, but when he goes over to Mr. Park's house to feed the dog, the dog is dead. Darryl, instead of just telling Mr. Park the truth, freaks out and buys a look-alike Dalmatian. When Mr. Park gets home, he of course isn't convinced that this new dog is his. When Darryl admits the truth Mr. Park laughs because his dog was actually dead before he left for his trip and he just set Darryl up.
56	11	"Love or Money"	Brian K. Roberts	Stacy A. Littlejohn	December 11, 2000	2-00-311	3.89
Despite Yvonne's misgivings about helping friends and relatives, Darryl agrees to help his aunt with her failing hair salon, and develops a bold plan for a grand reopening.
57	12	"It Had to Be Jew"	Brian K. Roberts	Story by : D.L. Hughley; Teleplay by : Matt Ember	January 15, 2001	2-00-312	2.97
Darryl's belief that blacks and Jews do not get along is tested when he and his Jewish neighbor take part in a fund-raising event for the local community center.
58	13	"Bamboozled"	Steve Zuckerman	Myles Avery Mapp	February 5, 2001	2-00-314	3.61
Much to Darryl's delight, Dave's embarrassed by his visiting hillbilly cousin DuWayne (D. L. Hughley in a dual role).
59	14	"My Horny Valentine"	Mary Lou Belli	Bootsie	February 12, 2001	2-00-313	3.90
Worried that their relationship is based just on sex, Yvonne decides she and Darryl should abstain for the week leading up to Valentine's Day.
60	15	"Forty Acres and a Fool"	Steve Zuckerman	Ernest Hollingsworth	February 19, 2001	2-00-315	3.69
Darryl's biological father, Jerry Rose (Billy Dee Williams), reenters his life, asking to meet with Darryl's mother and angering Darryl in the process.
61	16	"It's a Wonderful Life"	Steve Zuckerman	John D. Beck & Ron Hart	February 26, 2001	2-00-316	3.56
When Darryl is having difficulty with Yvonne he thinks it would be better to be married to a white woman. That night, he dreams that he is, and he soon realizes that as long as he is a jackass it doesn't matter what color his wife is, he's still going to have problems.
62	17	"South Side Story"	Steve Zuckerman	Todd R. Jones & Earl Richey Jones	March 5, 2001	2-00-318	3.72
After Darryl donates vending machines to the community center where he hung out as a teenager, Michael starts spending time there too. While Yvonne worries about the effect it's having on Michael, Darryl is pleased about his son's interest in the community center... until an old acquaintance reveals a secret about Darryl's past as a gang member.
63	18	"Something About Shari"	Mark Cendrowski	Stacy A. Littlejohn and Todd R. Jones & Earl Richey Jones	March 12, 2001	2-00-320	4.09
Darryl plays host for the wedding of Yvonne's sister, but things turn difficult when he catches the groom cheating with a stripper at his bachelor party.
64	19	"Darryl, Family Counselor"	Steve Zuckerman	Jane Milmore & Billy Van Zandt	March 19, 2001	2-00-317	3.67
Dave has a run-in with his visiting mother-in-law Edna, leading him to move in with Darryl and Yvonne. Fed up with his messiness, however, Darryl takes it upon himself to reingratiate Dave with Sally and Edna.
65	20	"Road Rage"	Mark Cendrowski	Anne Parker	April 30, 2001	2-00-319	2.62
After they receive traffic citations, Darryl, Dave and Milsap attend driving school, where Darryl runs into radio talk-show host Larry Elder, whose conservative opinions irritate him. Meanwhile, Milsap tries to get into the eccentric teacher's good graces.
66	21	"Mother's Day"	Mary Lou Belli	Story by : Stacy A. Littlejohn; Teleplay by : Myles Mapp and Todd R. Jones & Earl Richey Jones	May 7, 2001	2-00-322	3.07
The perfect Mother's Day that Darryl promised Yvonne goes up in smoke when their mothers arrive for surprise visits and commiserate over how much harder life was for them without the modern conveniences Yvonne now enjoys.
67	22	"Titanic II: Electric Boogaloo"	Mark Cendrowski	John D. Beck, Ron Hart & Myles Avery Mapp	May 14, 2001	2-00-321	3.00
Darryl and Yvonne's dreams of a romantic getaway cruise quickly sink after they encounter their shipmates and Yvonne discovers the highs— and lows —of gambling at the ship's casino.

=== Season 4 (2001–02) ===
No. overall	No. in season	Title	Directed by	Written by	Original release date	Prod. code	Viewers (millions)
68	1	"Joint Custody"	Leonard R. Garner Jr.	Ernest L. Hollingsworth	September 3, 2001	2-01-401	4.17
Darryl is having a bad day: Yvonne's freeloading sister Shari is moving into an apartment in their neighborhood. Then Shari comes over to his place and tries to steal a jacket that belongs to Sydney. Darryl struggles with her over it and a marijuana joint falls out of a pocket. That throws Darryl and Yvonne for a loop, but they're even more shocked when Sydney reveals to whom the jacket really belongs.
69	2	"Mid-Wife Crisis"	Brian K. Roberts	John D. Beck & Ron Hart	September 10, 2001	2-01-402	4.10
Yvonne expresses interest in getting a job outside the home, but Darryl doesn't think she has any marketable skills. Also, Darryl woos a possible new business partner with a homemade dinner; and Yvonne becomes the neighborhood's "hot mom."
70	3	"A Cry for Pleh"	Mary Lou Belli	Earl Richey Jones & Todd R. Jones	September 17, 2001	2-01-403	3.67
After Michael is diagnosed with dyslexia, Darryl and Yvonne hire a tutor to help him with his studies. Darryl, however, is quickly taken aback by the woman because she makes him feel dumb.
71	4	"Go with the Flow"	Steve Zuckerman	Myles Avery Mapp	September 24, 2001	2-01-404	4.28
While Yvonne is away on business, Darryl finds himself thrust into a mothering role when Sydney has her first period.
72	5	"Stormy Weather"	Brian K. Roberts	Donald Todd	October 1, 2001	2-01-407	3.87
Yvonne worries that the romance has dimmed between her and Darryl after looking over Michael's English paper, then following one of Sally's brief psychoanalyses the next day, especially since Milsap and Coral have become more in love with each other than her. To prove to her that it hasn't, Darryl arranges a night on the town that she won't soon forget.
73	6	"Hughley & Son"	Brian K. Roberts	Tom J. Astle	October 8, 2001	2-01-406	3.69
Darryl and Yvonne discover that Michael has been skipping school, but instead of forcing him back to the classroom, Darryl decides to give him a taste of the working world and brings him aboard at Hughley Vending.
74	7	"When Darryl Bumped Sally"	Steve Zuckerman	Jane Milmore & Billy Van Zandt	October 15, 2001	2-01-405	4.02
Sally gets a therapy talk show and Darryl is the sponsor. Instead of just broadcasting a sponsorship message, however, Darryl ends up giving his own advice to the callers. The producers love Darryl's caustic attitude and bring him on as a co-host. Sally is disgusted, and leaves the show.
75	8	"Whatchoo Stalkin' About, Willis?"	Mark Cendrowski	Anne Parker	October 29, 2001	2-01-409	4.49
The cast is trying to rehearse their Halloween episode when D.L. doesn't show up for his appearance. The cast argues about D.L. not showing up, and when the star does decide to make an appearance, he puts everyone else down and fires the director. The lights go out and there's a deep, threatening voice. The cast investigates and are captured by a robed figure one by one until D.L. is the only one left. D.L. decides he'll just have his own show, starring, written by, and directed by him. However, when he finds the rest of his cast tied up and gagged in his dressing room, D.L. is relieved. He begins untying everyone but is interrupted by an attack by the robed figure. He fights off the mysterious stalker and manages to unrobe him, revealing.... Gary Coleman.
76	9	"Daddy's Lil' Girl"	Mary Lou Belli	John D. Beck & Ron Hart	November 5, 2001	2-01-408	4.53
Darryl brings Sydney to a store with very revealing clothes, against Yvonne's protest. Sydney convinced Darryl that she was only going to buy a shirt that was not fit for a "Hootchie" but she went out of control and bought very revealing clothes just because she won a contest to meet rapper Lil' Romeo. Meanwhile, Dave and Milsap have Lil' plans of their own involving Michael, which includes making him a rapper. Michael a.k.a. Spoon Boy auditioned in front of Romeo trying to get a record deal, but no luck.
77	10	"The Keepin' It Real World"	Mary Lou Belli	Earl Richey Jones & Todd R. Jones	November 12, 2001	2-01-410	3.7
After being lured into a time-share scam, Darryl and company become trapped in a cabin in the woods and are forced to confront some "real world" issues.
78	11	"One Foot in the Grave-y"	Leonard R. Garner Jr.	Ernest L. Hollingsworth	November 19, 2001	2-01-411	4.86
Darryl's mother, Hattie Mae, wrests control of Thanksgiving dinner from Yvonne, forcing Darryl to make a stand. Also, Shari bets Milsap and Dave that she's more football-savvy than they are.
79	12	"I'm Dreaming of a Slight Christmas"	Mary Lou Belli	Christopher Shiple	December 17, 2001	2-01-412	3.30
Believing that Michael and Sydney are spoiled, Darryl and Yvonne show the kids what the true meaning of Christmas is. Meanwhile, the family's Christmas cheer is endangered when Shari accidentally gives the kids' new presents to a foster-child facility; and Milsap gives Dave and Sally a lottery ticket that might be worth big bucks.
80	13	"I Have a Scheme"	Mary Lou Belli	Myles Avery Mapp	January 21, 2002	2-01-413	3.72
When Michael leads the neighborhood effort to rename their street after Dr. Martin Luther King Jr., Darryl puts the plan into jeopardy by alienating a neighbor with a particularly egregious breach of political correctness. Meanwhile, Sydney uses VIP concert tickets to bribe her way into the popular school crowd, only for one of them to talk her into drinking her first beer.
81	14	"Smells Like Free Spirit"	Andrew Susskind	Story by : D.L. Hughley; Teleplay by : Tom J. Astle	February 4, 2002	2-01-416	3.39
Darryl's wild 17-year-old niece Carly, an aspiring singer, arrives for an unexpected visit.
82	15	"Leaving Las Vegas"	Ken Whittingham	Jane Milmore & Billy Van Zandt	February 11, 2002	2-01-414	3.77
Darryl's planned Valentine's Day surprise for Yvonne — a weekend vacation — turns into a bust when they're stranded at the airport. Meanwhile, Milsap is left in charge of Michael and Sydney.
83	16	"Bored of the Rings"	Leonard R. Garner Jr.	Marco Pennette	February 25, 2002	2-01-415	3.90
Darryl is shocked to learn his parents have split up, and attempts to facilitate a reconciliation. Meanwhile, Michael attempts to choreograph Sydney's talent show in an effort to make a lasting impression on her girlfriends.
84	17	"Jump the Jump"	Steve Zuckerman	Howard Meyers	March 4, 2002	2-01-417	2.5
When Michael's fear of heights prevents him from participating in a school rope climbing project, Darryl is compelled to reveal that he, too, has long shared the same phobia. Together they choose to face their fears in the ultimate test: a perilous skydiving adventure. Meanwhile, Yvonne explores news ways to maintain a friendship with teenage daughter Sydney.
85	18	"You've Got Male"	Leonard R. Garner Jr.	Story by : D.L. Hughley; Teleplay by : Tom J. Astle	March 25, 2002	2-01-419	3.80
Sydney receives a new computer, but is warned not to go into any chat rooms, which she does. Meanwhile, Carly is having difficulties with her songwriting assignment, so Yvonne attempts to help using a poem Darryl made to fall in love with her, only for it to be based on a Barry Manilow song. Also, the adults are convinced Michael may have begun relieving himself when at home.
86	19	"Directed by Darryl Hughley"	Mark Cendrowski	Donald Todd	April 29, 2002	2-01-418	2.59
In pursuit of a kiss from his dream girl, Michael joins the school production of Damn Yankees and finds that his father, who is directing, may jeopardize his plans. Meanwhile, Milsap and Shari find that a new computer dating service leads them to familiar territory.
87	20	"How Hattie Got Her Groove Back"	Mark Cendrowski	Anne Parker	May 6, 2002	2-01-422	2.82
Darryl is unhappy when he discovers that his mother Hattie Mae is involved with her piano teacher. Michael's Mother's Day gift for Yvonne causes a rift between Yvonne and Sally.
88	21	"It's a Girl: Part 1"	Leonard R. Garner Jr.	John D. Beck & Ron Hart and Earl Richey Jones & Todd Jones	May 13, 2002	2-01-420	3.23
Milsap and Darryl attend their 20th high-school reunion, where Milsap learns that he became a father after the 15th reunion. Darryl reunites with a former girlfriend.
89	22	"It's a Girl: Part 2"	Mark Cendrowski	Marco Pennette	May 20, 2002	2-01-421	4.19
Darryl faces the music — and possibly the end of his marriage — when Yvonne learns what happened between him and his old flame Camille at their high-school reunion. Meanwhile, Milsap continues to adjust to his new life with Adriana; and Darryl's niece Carly heads off to college in hopes of finding peace, tranquility and no Hughleys. But to Carly's dismay, Michael and Sydney arrive for an impromptu visit on her first day.
