= Maria Răducanu =

Romanian musician (born 1967)

- Born: Maria Răducanu; 3 November 1967 (age 58); Huși, Vaslui, Romania
- Occupation: Singer-songwriter
- Years active: 1984–present

Maria Răducanu (born 3 November 1967, Huși, jud. Vaslui) is a self-taught Romanian ethno jazz singer-songwriter, noted for her vocal range and considered as representative of the new Romanian jazz. She mixes jazz with Romanian folk music, songs by Maria Tănase, to whom she has been compared, fado and European music from the 16th century.

== Discography ==
- Ziori (Tzadik, 2010) with Marc Ribot (guitars, bass) and Nicolai Adi Chiru (2nd guitar)
- Pure Music (The End Film, 2008) with Krister Jonsson (guitar)
- Troika – Chansons Russes (Arbore Sonor, 2005) with Maxim Belciug (guitar)
- La Tarara – Chansons Espagnoles (Arbore Sonor, 2005) with Maxim Belciug (guitar)
- Cantece din Rasarit / Chants du Levant (Institut Francais de Bucarest, 2005) with Jan Roder (bass)
- Lumini (La Strada Music, 2004) with Mircea Tiberian (piano)
- Viata Lumij (2003) with Mircea Tiberian Quartet
- Colinde (La Strada Music, 2002) with Vlaicu Golcea (double bass) and Sorin Romanescu (guitar)
- Pe vale (La Strada Music, 2002) with Vlaicu Golcea (double bass) and Sorin Romanescu (guitar) (nominated in Romania for the best jazz creation award)

== Special contribution ==
Maria Răducanu received an offer from The Walt Disney Company, and she provides the Romanian voice of Ariel, in The Little Mermaid (TV series) (1992– Ager Film), and in 2005 in the classic eternal Disney dubbing, The Little Mermaid.
