= Anna Carlsson =

German voice actress

- Occupation: Voice actress

Anna Carlsson is a German voice actress.

Anna Carlsson is from Frankfurt am Main.

== Career ==
Carlsson voices in the German-language dubs of a number of animation and anime productions, including Kim Possible. The Little Mermaid, Lilo & Stitch: The Series, Cardcaptor Sakura, Dr. Slump and Dragon Ball. In live-action dubbing she voiced in Desperate Housewives, Angel, and Samantha Who?. She is the dub voice for Eva Longoria, Piper Perabo, Zooey Deschanel, and Amy Smart on a number of films and shows.

She is fluent in the languages of German, English, and Swedish.

== Filmography ==
=== Film ===
List of voice performances in feature films
Title	Role	Dub voice for, Notes	Source
21	Kianna	Liza Lapira	
The Accidental Husband	Marcy	Lindsay Sloane	
A Dirty Shame	Caprice Stickles	Selma Blair	
A Family	Chrisser	Line Kruse	
Ah! My Goddess: The Movie	Morgan	Ayako Kawasumi	
Almost Famous	Penny Lane	Kate Hudson	
The American	Mathilde	Thekla Reuten	
American Pie 2	Danielle	Denise Faye	
Apocalypse Now: Redux	Terri Tereil	Colleen Camp	
Aquamarine	Aquamarine	Sara Paxton	
Arsène Lupin	Clarisse von Dreux-Soubise	Eva Green	
The Aviator	Jean Harlow	Gwen Stefani	
Bad Company	Julie	Kerry Washington	
Bandits	Claire / Pink Boots	January Jones	
Barbie: A Fashion Fairytale	Jaqueline, Jilliana	Alexa Devine, Annick Obonsawin	
Barney's Version	Clara 'Chambers' Charnofsky	Rachelle Lefevre	
The Baytown Outlaws	Celeste	Eva Longoria	
Because I Said So	Mae	Piper Perabo	
Beverly Hills Chihuahua	Rachel Ashe Lynn	Piper Perabo	
Bewitched	Nina Johnson	Heather Burns	
The Big Bounce	Nancy Hayes	Sara Foster	
The Big Tease	Gretle Dickens	Sara Gilbert	
Black Dahlia	Sheryl Saddon	Rose McGowan	
Buffalo '66	Layla	Christina Ricci	
Buffalo Soldiers	Robyn Lee	Anna Paquin	
The Butterfly Effect	Kayleigh Miller	Amy Smart	
The Candidate (2008 film)	Camilla	Tuva Novotny; Synchro dub 2012	
Cardcaptor Sakura Movie 2: The Sealed Card	Meiling Li	Yukana Nogami	
Cardcaptor Sakura: The Movie	Meiling Li	Yukana Nogami	
Carolina	Georgia Mirabeau	Azura Skye	
Chaos	Marnie Rollins	Keegan Connor Tracy	
The Children of Noisy Village	Anna	Anna Sahlin	
The Cider House Rules	Candy Kendall	Charlize Theron	
City of God	Angélica	Alice Braga	
Club Dread	Kellie	Tanja Reichert	
Coco Chanel	Coco Chanel	Barbora Bobulova; Synchro dub 2010	
Columbus Circle	Abigail	Selma Blair	
Coyote Ugly	Violet Sanford	Piper Perabo	
Cradle 2 the Grave	Sona	Kelly Hu	
Cry_Wolf	Dodger	Lindy Booth	
Dancing in September	Rhonda	Malinda Williams	
Declaration of War	Juliette	Valérie Donzelli	
The Diving Bell and the Butterfly	Henriette Durand	Marie-Josée Croze	
Dragon Ball Z: Battle of Gods	Videl	Yuuko Minaguchi	
Dragon Ball Z: Broly – Second Coming	Videl	Yuuko Minaguchi	
Dragonlance: Dragons of Autumn Twilight	Tika	Michelle Trachtenberg	
The Dukes of Hazzard	Daisy Duke	Jessica Simpson	
Eulogy	Katie Collins	Zooey Deschanel	
Everyday People	Joleen	Bridget Barkan	
Failure to Launch	Kit	Zooey Deschanel	
Far Cry	Valerie Cardinal	Emmanuelle Vaugier	
The Final Curtain	Karen Willet	Julia Sawalha	
Final Destination	Terry Chancey	Amanda Detmer	
Flawless	Cassie Jay	Natalie Dormer	
Forces spéciales	Elsa	Diane Kruger	
George and the Dragon	Princess Lunna	Piper Perabo	
Going the Distance	Female Bartender	Kristen Schaal	
Goliyon Ki Raasleela Ram-Leela	Kesar	Barkha Bisht	
Gotta Kick It Up!	Daisy	Camille Guaty	
Guess Who	Polly	Jessica Cauffiel	
Halloween: Resurrection	Donna	Daisy McCrackin	
Harsh Times	Sylvia	Eva Longoria	
The Heartbreak Kid	Consuela	Eva Longoria	
The Hitchhiker's Guide to the Galaxy	Trillian	Piper Perabo	
Hogfather	Susan	Michelle Dockery	
House Bunny	Lilly	Kiely Williams	
House of 9	Claire Leevy	Susie Amy	
I Don't Know How She Does It	Allison Henderson	Christina Hendricks	
In a World...	Eva Longoria	Eva Longoria	
In Bruges	Marie	Thekla Reuten	
Journey to the Center of the Earth	Hannah Ásgeirsson	Anita Briem	
Julia	Elena	Kate del Castillo	
Kangaroo Jack: G'Day U.S.A.!	Jessie	Kath Soucie	
Kim Possible Movie: So the Drama	Kim Possible	Christy Carlson Romano	
Kim Possible: A Sitch in Time	Kim Possible	Christy Carlson Romano	
Kingsman: The Secret Service	Princess Tilde	Hanna Alström	
Lady in the Water	Young-Soon Choi	Cindy Cheung	
Le Divorce	Isabel Walker	Kate Hudson	
Le Roi danse	Julie	Claire Keim	
Legally Blonde	Margot	Jessica Cauffiel	
Legally Blonde 2	Margot	Jessica Cauffiel	
Leroy & Stitch	Nani Pelekai	Tia Carrere	
Lethal Weapon 4	Rianne Murtaugh	Traci Wolfe	
Lilo & Stitch 2: Stitch Has a Glitch	Nani Pelekai	Tia Carrere	
The Little Mermaid films and direct-to-videos	Ariel	Jodi Benson	
Little White Lies	Léa	Louise Monot	
The Long Weekend	Susie	Chelan Simmons	
Looper	Suzie	Piper Perabo	
Love and Other Disasters	Talullah Wentworth	Catherine Tate	
Love Me No More	Cecile	Marie-Josée Croze	
Macbeth	Paddock	Kate Bell; 2006 film, Synchro dub 2010	
Mammoth	Ellen Vidales	Michelle Williams	
Mark of an Angel	Laurence	Sophie Quinton	
Martha Marcy May Marlene	Lucy	Sarah Paulson	
Memoirs of a Geisha	Sayuri	Zhang Ziyi	
More About the Children of Noisy Village	Anna	Anna Sahlin	
Movie 43	Angie	Katie Finneran	
My Little Eye	Emma	Laura Regan	
Mystery, Alaska	Sarah Heinz	Megyn Price	
Not Another Teen Movie	Janey Briggs	Chyler Leigh	
The Notebook	Sara Tuffington	Heather Wahlquist	
Over Her Dead Body	Kate	Eva Longoria	
Pieces of April	Beth Burns	Alison Pill	
Playing Mona Lisa	Alice	Tammy Townsend	
Pokémon: The Movie 2000	Maren	Kotono Mitsuishi	
Ranma ½: Big Trouble in Nekonron, China	Ukyo Kuonji	Hiromi Tsuru	
Ranma ½: Nihao My Concubine	Ukyo Kuonji	Hiromi Tsuru	
The Recruit	Layla Moore	Bridget Moynahan	
The Refuge	Mousse	Isabelle Carré	
Road Trip	Beth	Amy Smart	
Rush Hour 2	Hu Li	Zhang Ziyi	
Russian Dolls	Celia Shelburn	Lucy Gordon	
Santa Who?	Claire Dreyer	Robyn Lively	
Saturday Night Fever	Connie	Fran Drescher; Synchro dub 2002	
Scooby-Doo	Velma Dinkley	Linda Cardellini	
The Sentinel	Jill Marin	Eva Longoria	
Single White Female 2: The Psycho	Holly Parker	Kristen Miller	
Somewhere	Claire	Ellie Kemper	
Soul Surfer	Sarah Hill	Carrie Underwood	
Starsky & Hutch	Holly	Amy Smart	
Stitch! The Movie	Nani Pelekai	Tia Carrere	
Storm Watch	Tess Woodward	Vanessa Marcil	
Sugar & Spice	Hannah Wald	Rachel Blanchard	
Sundays at Tiffany's	Jaqueline	Kristin Booth; Synchro dub 2012	
The Sweetest Thing	Jane Burns	Selma Blair	
Tortilla Soup	Maribel Naranjo	Tamara Mello	
Trainwreck	Nikki	Vanessa Bayer	
Transporter	Lai	Qi Shu	
The Truth	Mia Francis	Eva Longoria	
Urban Legends: Final Cut	Amy Mayfield	Jennifer Morrison	
White Chicks	Tori	Jessica Cauffiel	
White Oleander	Hannah	Allison Munn	
Who Killed Bambi?	Isabelle / Bambi	Sophie Quinton	
Winter Passing	Reese Holden	Zooey Deschanel	
Winx Club 3D: Magical Adventure	Darcy	Federica De Bortoli	
Winx Club: The Secret of the Lost Kingdom	Darcy		
Wish Upon a Star	Hayley Wheaton	Danielle Harris	
Without a Paddle	Flower	Rachel Blanchard	
Without Men	Rosalba	Eva Longoria	
xXx	J.J.	Eve	
You, Me and Dupree	Annie	Amanda Detmer	
Your Highness	Belladonna	Zooey Deschanel	

=== Television ===
List of voice performances in television
Title	Role	Dub voice for, Notes	Source
7th Haven	Kendall	Leighton Meester; Ep. 22, 23	
Accidentally on Purpose	Brenda	Rachel Boston; Ep. "The Escort" (ep. 1x17)	
Accused	Donna Armstrong	Andrea Lowe; Ep. "Kennys Geschichte"	
Alias	Carrie Bowman	Amanda Foreman	
American Horror Story	Dr. Alex Lowe, Shelley	Chloë Sevigny	
Angel	Faith	Eliza Dushku	
Annika Bengtzon	Annika Bengtzon	Malin Crépin	
Becker	Darcy Thompson	Angela Shelton	
Bones	Margaret Whitesell	Zooey Deschanel; Ep. "Was vom Mann der Weihnacht übrig blieb (5x10)"	
Buffy	Halfrek	Kali Rocha	
The Bush Baby	Harva	Mami Matsui	
Buzz Lightyear of Star Command	Mira Nova	Nicole Sullivan	
Cardcaptor Sakura	Meiling Li	Yukana Nogami	
Case Closed	Various guest characters		
Charmed	Paige Matthews	Rose McGowan	
Cold Case	Claire Shepard	Azura Skye	
Columbo	Vanessa	Jennifer Sky; Ep. "Columbo Likes the Nightlife"	
Covert Affairs	Annie Walker	Piper Perabo	
CSI: Miami	Sara Piper	Jennifer Sky; Ep. "Würgemale (2x24); Game Over (3x18)"	
CSI: NY	Lindsay Monroe	Anna Belknap	
Delilah and Julius	Zoe Ling	Athena Karkanis	
Desperate Housewives	Gabrielle Solis	Eva Longoria	
Digimon Frontier	Lanamon, Calmaramon	Haruhi Terada	
Fillmore!	Karen Tehama	Lauren Tom	
Dr. Slump	Akane Kimidori	Hiroko Konishi	
L.A. Dragnet	Det. Gloria Duran	Eva Longoria	
Dragon Ball Z	Videl	Yuuko Minaguchi	
ER	Various characters		
Felicity	Meghan Rotundi	Amanda Foreman	
Full Metal Panic? Fumoffu!	Youko Wakana	Akiko Hiramatsu	
Go On	Simone	Piper Perabo; Ep. 14-17	
Greek	Kiki	Collette Wolfe; Ep. "Hals über Kopf (2x16)"	
Grey's Anatomy	Ellis Grey (jung)	Sarah Paulson; Ep. "Die Zeitschleife (6x15)"	
Hotel Babylon	Lady Catherine Stanwood	Kelly Brook; Ep. 3	
Irene Huss	Sanna Kaegler	Tuva Novotny; Ep. "Der erste Verdacht"	
Jack and Jill	Elisa Cronkite	Sarah Paulson	
JAG	Abigail Abby Sciuto	Pauley Perrette; Ep. "Eisige Zeiten, Teil 1 & 2"	
JAG	Rachel Hanna	Ali Hillis; Ep. "Vier Frauen"	
Joey	Jane	Reagan Dale Neis; Ep. "Der Buchclub"	
Kim Possible	Kim Possible	Christy Carlson Romano	
Law & Order: Special Victims Unit	Christine Danielson; A.D.A. Gillian Hardwicke	Gloria Reuben; Melissa Sagemiller	
Lewis	Andrea De Ritter	Elize du Toit; Ep. "Mörderisches Verhängnis (#5.4)"	
Lie to Me	Michelle Russell	Clea DuVall; Ep. "Geblendet (1x12)"	
Lilo & Stitch: The Series	Nani Pelekai	Tia Carrere	
Mad About You	Jane	Megan Mullally; Ep. "Eine herbe Enttäuschung"	
Mad Men	Mutter Lakshmi	Anna Wood; Ep. "Crane vs. Krishna"	
Magi-Nation	Edyn	Martha MacIsaac	
Malcolm in the Middle	Various characters		
Wallander	Linda Wallander	Johanna Sällström	
Medium	Various characters		
Miami Medical	Anna Tischer	Rosalie Ward	
House of Mouse	Ariel	Jodi Benson	
NCIS: Los Angeles	Ariel Drewett	Wynn Everett; Ep. "Ein letzter Test (2x21)"	
NCIS: Los Angeles	Vanessa Maragos	Elaine Hendrix; Ep. "Neun Stunden (2x05)"	
NCIS	Wendy Smith	Merritt Wever; Ep. "Rollentausch"	
Nip/Tuck	Agatha Ripp	Sarah Paulson; Ep. "8"	
Odyssey 5	Holly Culverson	Lindy Booth	
Office Girl	Deirdre Bishop	Nicole Sullivan; Ep. 15, 19	
Oliver Beene	Elke	Maggie Grace	
One Tree Hill	Carrie	Torrey DeVitto	
Party of Five	Callie Martel	Alexondra Lee; Ep. "Ein hoher Preis"	
Pushing Daisies	Hedda Lillihammer	Ivana Milicevic; Ep. CSI Norwegian (2x10)	
Sabrina, the Teenage Witch	Zoe; Colette	Ally Holmes, Ep. "Ein wahres Wunder"; Ginger Williams, Ep. "Eine Frage des Alters"	-->
Sailor Moon	Black Lady	Kae Araki	
Samantha Who?	Samantha Newly	Christina Applegate	
Scrubs	Alex	Elizabeth Bogush	
Sherlock	Mary Morstan / Watson	Amanda Abbington	
Sofia the First	Princess Ariel	Jodi Benson; Ep. "Sofia die erste und die Meerjungfrauen"	
Stargate SG-1	Reese	Danielle Nicolet; Ep. "Reese"	
Supernatural (U.S. TV series)	Tammi	Marisa Ramirez; Ep. "Hexenzauber (3x09)"	
That 70s Show	Various characters		
That's My Bush!	Princess Stevenson	Kristen Miller	
The Border	Sergeant Layla Hourani	Nazneen Contractor	
The Exes	Deanna	Kali Rocha	
The Following	Julianna	Anna Wood; Ep. 3-5	
The Fosters	Ana Gutiérrez	Alexandra Barreto	
The Ghost Whisperer	Sandra Holloway	Elaine Hendrix; Ep. "Der letzte Vorhang"	
The Ghost Whisperer	Colleen Finn	Sarah Utterback; Ep. "Kranke Liebe"	
The Mentalist	Lorelei Martins	Emmanuelle Chriqui; Ep. 24 1 8	
The Mentalist	Francine Trent	Holley Fain; Ep. "Schmerzensschreie (3x17)"	
The Royals	Königin Helena Henstridge	Elizabeth Hurley	
The Starter Wife	Sasha	Leeanna Walsman	
The Suite Life on Deck	Helga	Mary Kate McGeehan; Ep. "Alter Schwede!"	
The Trouble with Normal	Claire Garletti	Paget Brewster	
The West Wing	Annabeth Schott	Kristin Chenoweth	
Un paso adelante	Lola Fernández	Beatriz Luengo	
Welcome to Sweden	Emma Wiik	Josephine Bornebusch	
Winx Club	Diaspro	Ariana Grande	
Without a Trace	Maggie Cartwright	Arija Bareikis; Ep. "Das brave Mädchen"	
Xena: Warrior Princess	Amarice	Jennifer Sky	

=== Other media ===
In the German version of the Computer Game Jagged Alliance (1995) she voiced one of the main supporting characters, Brenda Richards.
