= Marietta DePrima =

American actress (born 1964)

- Born: February 9, 1964 (age 62); Chicago, Illinois, U.S.
- Occupation: Actress
- Years active: 1984–present
- Spouse: George Newbern (m. 1990)
- Children: 3

Marietta DePrima Newbern (born February 9, 1964) is an American actress, best known for playing the role Sally Rogers, opposite actor Eric Allen Kramer, on the ABC/UPN sitcom, The Hughleys.

== Early life ==
Marietta is a graduate of Carmel Catholic High School in Mundelein, Illinois, and Saint Joseph Elementary School in Libertyville, Illinois.

== Career ==
DePrima has appeared in many television programs including Family Ties, Tour of Duty, Quantum Leap, Boston Legal, Dear John, Diagnosis: Murder, and Matlock. She played Ariel in a failed Disney Channel live-action/puppetry TV show called Little Mermaid's Island, as conceived by Jim Henson.

== Personal life ==
DePrima and her husband, actor George Newbern, both graduated from Northwestern University, where she was a member of Kappa Alpha Theta, in 1986 with degrees in Radio/TV/Film. They were married in 1990, and have three children: Emma (b. 1995), Mae (b. 1998), and Ben (b. 2002).
