= Renata Sabljak =

Croatian actress and singer

- Born: Renata Sabljak; 2 June 1977 (age 48); Zagreb, SR Croatia, SFR Yugoslavia
- Citizenship: Croatia
- Occupations: Actress, singer
- Spouse: Robert Prelec (m. 2008)
- Children: 2
- Awards: Order of Danica Hrvatska

Renata Sabljak (born 2 June 1977) is a Croatian film, theatre, voice actress and singer.

== Biography ==
Sabljak was born on 2 June 1977 in Zagreb to Nikola and Sanda Sabljak. She went to "Tituš Brezovački Gymnasium". She graduated from the Academy of Dramatic Arts of the University of Zagreb. She sang at the inauguration of first Croatia's female president Kolinda Grabar-Kitarović in February 2015.

== Personal life ==
She married Robert Prelec in 2008. They have twins; Borna and Luka.

== Filmography ==
=== Film ===
Film
Year	Title	Role
2001	The Miroslav Holding Co.	Ana-Marija
2009	Baza Djeda Mraza	Hilda Pilić

=== Croatian voice-dub ===
Film
Year	Title	Role
1989	The Little Mermaid	Ariel
1991	Beauty and the Beast	Belle
1992	Aladdin	Princess Jasmine (singing)
1998	The Lion King 2: Simba's Pride	Kiara
2001	Shrek	Fiona
2004	Shrek 2	Fiona
2007	Shrek the Third	Fiona
2007	Shrek the Halls	Fiona
2010	Marmaduke	Jezebel
2010	Shrek Forever After	Fiona
2011	A Monster in Paris	Lucille
2014	Rio 2	Gaby
2014	My Catholic Family	Esmeralda
2015	Minions	Scarlet Overkill
