= Joe Breen =

Canadian football player

Profile
- Position: Running back

Personal information
- Born: April 23, 1897; Toronto, Ontario, Canada
- Died: October 13, 1978 (aged 81); Toronto, Ontario, Canada

Career information
- College: University of Toronto

Career history
- 1924–1925: Toronto Argonauts

Awards and highlights
- CFL Eastern All-Star (1921)
- Canadian Football Hall of Fame (Class of 1963)

Joseph M. Breen (April 23, 1897 – October 13, 1978) was a Canadian football player for two seasons for the Toronto Argonauts of the Interprovincial Rugby Football Union. Later, he coached at the University of Western Ontario and was a referee from 1935 through 1940. He was inducted into the Canadian Football Hall of Fame in 1963 and into the Canada's Sports Hall of Fame in 1975.
