= John Henton =

American actor and comedian (born 1960)

- Born: November 23, 1960 (age 65); East Cleveland, Ohio, U.S.
- Occupations: Actor, comedian
- Years active: 1982–present
- Children: 1

John Henton (born November 23, 1960) is an American actor and comedian. Henton is known for his roles as Overton Wakefield Jones on the Fox sitcom Living Single and as Milsap Morris on the ABC/UPN sitcom The Hughleys.

== Life and career ==
Henton was born in East Cleveland, Ohio. He is a graduate of Shaw High School.

In 1982, Henton had a day job working at a paint warehouse and was taking computer classes in the evenings. He decided to perform at an amateur night at a Cleveland comedy club. On his second performance, Henton won the amateur night contest.

Henton was a stand-up comedian in the Cleveland area for a few years. He took his comedy on the road for a year and won the 1991 Johnny Walker National Comedy Search.

Henton was spotted by The Tonight Show Starring Johnny Carson comedy executive Jim McCawley, who booked him to perform on the show on June 5, 1991. As Henton finished his set, he looked to Carson for his approval. Carson, Ed McMahon, and guest Tony Bennett all waved Henton over to take a seat on Carson's guest couch. During a commercial break, Carson asked Henton if he had an agent. Henton said he didn't, and Carson told him, "Well, you will after tonight." Henton appeared on Comic Strip Live ten days later, and he was booked for a second performance on The Tonight Show on October 11. Henton's comedy special, John Henton: Comedy with an Attitude, aired on Showtime in January 1993.

Henton played the role of Overton Wakefield Jones on the Fox sitcom Living Single. He also played Milsap Morris on the ABC/UPN sitcom The Hughleys. Henton has made guest appearances on other sitcoms One on One, The Parkers, For Your Love, Hannah Montana and Love That Girl!.

In September 2000, Henton was involved in a serious car accident that "destroyed his left eye socket, shattered both of his legs, broke nine teeth and ripped up his stomach". His face was badly deformed by the incident, though extensive plastic surgery restored most of his facial structure.
