= The Hughleys =

American television sitcom (1998–2002)

- Genre: Sitcom
- Created by: D. L. Hughley; Matt Wickline
- Starring: D. L. Hughley; Elise Neal; Eric Allan Kramer; John Henton; Ashley Monique Clark; Dee Jay Daniels; Marietta DePrima
- Theme music composer: Jonathan Wolff and Paul Buckley
- Composers: Jonathan Wolff and Paul Buckley (seasons 1–2); Jonathan Wolff, Paul Buckley & Scott Clausen (seasons 3–4) (Main theme by John Butcher and Andrew Rollins)
- Country of origin: United States
- Original language: English
- No. of seasons: 4
- No. of episodes: 89 (list of episodes)

Production
- Executive producers: Robert Greenblatt; David Janollari; Chris Rock; Michael Rotenberg; Dave Becky; Matt Wickline (seasons 1–3); D. L. Hughley (seasons 3–4); Kim Friese (season 3); Marco Pennette (season 4)
- Camera setup: Multi-camera
- Running time: 22–24 minutes
- Production companies: The Greenblatt/Janollari Studio; Willowick Entertainment (1998–2000) (seasons 1–2); Fox Television Studios

Original release
- Network: ABC
- Release: September 22, 1998 – April 28, 2000
- Network: UPN
- Release: September 11, 2000 – May 20, 2002

The Hughleys is an American television sitcom that aired on ABC from September 22, 1998, to April 28, 2000, and on UPN from September 11, 2000, to May 20, 2002. It was co-created by comedian D. L. Hughley and Matt Wickline and starred comedian Hughley as the main character, Darryl Hughley, and Elise Neal as Yvonne, his hard-working wife, who move their family from the inner city to suburban Los Angeles.

== Plot summary ==
The show starred D. L. Hughley as the main character, vending machine salesman Darryl Hughley. Elise Neal portrayed Darryl's wife Yvonne. Former Living Single co-star John Henton portrayed the couple's best friend Milsap Morris from the "old neighborhood", who often visited the family and helped them out (much resemblance to Willona visiting James and Florida on Good Times). Ashley Monique Clark portrayed Darryl and Yvonne's 12-year-old daughter Sydney, and Dee Jay Daniels portrayed their 10-year-old son Michael; both children sometimes acted out and sometimes caused complete chaos. Michael's best friends included Ronnie (Preston Wamsley), Otto (played by Connor Matheus in Seasons 1 and 2, then Ian Meltzer in Seasons 3 and 4), and Miles (Martin Spanjers).

The show's initial plot involved successful vending-machine business owner Darryl Hughley moving his family from a South Los Angeles ghetto to West Hills, a predominantly white neighborhood in the San Fernando Valley and move on up wealthy neighborhood. Darryl and his family try to adjust to living in an all-white area while trying not to forget who they are and where they came from. Darryl and Yvonne befriend their new neighbors, Sally and Dave, who are Darryl's polar opposites. The story has many racial themes that are usually comedic as Darryl makes fun of other races, especially his white and Korean neighbors.

== Cast and characters ==
Marietta DePrima and Eric Allan Kramer played Dave and Sally Rogers, a friendly, wholesome suburban white couple. Marla Gibbs played Darryl's happy-go-lucky mother Hattie Mae opposite Ellis Williams as his father Henry. Telma Hopkins portrayed Yvonne's mother, Paulette Williams, and Sherman Hemsley portrayed Yvonne's father, James Williams, who thought of Darryl as a "jackass". Patricia Belcher appeared as Aunt Jessie Mae Hughley, and Adele Givens portrayed Yvonne's older sister Shari Williams, Darryl's wisecracking, backtalking, evil sister-in-law.

The series had many guest stars including Ashley Tisdale, Billy Dee Williams as Darryl's biological father, Kelly Rowland, Lil' Romeo, Gary Coleman, Pat Morita, Vivica A. Fox, Mo'Nique, Tyra Banks, and Rose Marie.

from left: Marietta DePrima, Eric Allan Kramer, Ashley Monique Clark, Elise Neal, D. L. Hughley, Dee Jay Daniels, and John Henton

=== Main characters ===
- Darryl Hughley (D. L. Hughley): a thirty-five-year-old successful salesman and business owner. His wife is Yvonne, and they have two children, Sydney and Michael. He moved from his old black neighborhood into a white suburban neighborhood. He is the son of Henry and Hattie Mae Hughley. Upon the show's move from ABC to UPN, the character was featured in a crossover appearance on the UPN series The Parkers in the Season 2 episode "Who's Your Mama?". He is best friends with Milsap (his sales manager), and later his white neighbour Dave Rogers.
- Yvonne Williams-Hughley (Elise Neal): Darryl's wife, the mother of their two children, and best friend of Sally. She does not get along with Darryl's mother Hattie, who constantly criticizes everything she does. Darryl calls her "Vonnie", as does Milsap sometimes.
- Sydney (Ashley Monique Clark) and Michael Hughley (Dee Jay Daniels): Darryl and Yvonne's 12-year-old daughter and 11-year-old son.
- Dave (Eric Allan Kramer) and Sally Rogers (Marietta DePrima): the Hughley family's Caucasian neighbors and best friends. They often hang out and travel together. Initially, Darryl was unwilling to befriend them out of fear that they were racists. Dave can be described as a "jolly giant". He owns a sporting goods store, and is very knowledgeable about sports, vehicles, and extreme activities. Sally and Darryl have a sort of brother/sister-like friendship, as sometimes he'll turn to her for advice or jokingly tease her. Dave and Sally have two children: son Otto and daughter Gretchen. Sydney and Michael often address Dave and Sally as "Uncle Dave" and "Aunt Sally".
- Milsap Morris (John Henton), Darryl's lifelong best friend, the sales manager of his company. He frequently visits the Hughley household, and provides much comic relief throughout the series. Unlike Darryl, Milsap is unmarried with no children which sometimes saddens him. Early in the series, Dave becomes Milsap's second-best friend after the two form a strong friendship - which Darryl was jealous of at first until he learned to be friends with both men. Darryl, Yvonne, and Dave often refer to him by his nickname "Sap", whereas Sydney and Michael address him as "Uncle Sap" or "Uncle Milsap".

=== Recurring characters ===
- Hattie Mae Hughley (Marla Gibbs), Darryl's somewhat aggressive mother, who made her first appearance in "The Thanksgiving Episode". She criticizes Yvonne, from her cooking habits to everything else she finds wrong with her. She also appears to have a firm handle on Darryl as the no-nonsense mother who refuses to let him get away with anything, despite his adulthood. This is shown in many episodes, one example being Sydney and Michael failing to "punish" Daryl for drugs from his past, in which they get their grandmother to do it instead. She made her last appearance on "How Hattie Got Her Groove Back".
- Henry Hughley (Ellis Williams), Darryl's "father", who made his first appearance in "The Thanksgiving Episode". In the 2nd-season episode, Darryl discovers that Henry isn't his biological father; but still Darryl sees him as more of a father for raising him. He made his last appearance in "Bored of the Rings".
- Jessie Mae (Patricia Belcher), Darryl's maternal aunt. She made her first appearance in "The Thanksgiving Episode", where the Hughley women attempt to Thanksgiving cooking. In a few other appearances, she is shown more confrontational than Hattie Mae, but still may have her moments.
- Hazel/M'Dear (Virginia Capers), Darryl's maternal grandmother. She makes her first appearance in "The Thanksgiving Episode", where the Hughley women attempt to take over Thanksgiving cooking. She appears to be less insulting than Hattie Mae.
- Chuck Ballard (Taylor Negron), Darryl's neighbor and the kids' music teacher. Despite being a friend of the family, he often appears in antagonistic roles, such as the episode "Dog Eat Dog", where he faked a dog attack in spite of Darryl demanding him to take out his lewd lawn decorations.
- JoJo (Miguel A. Núñez Jr.), Darryl's older brother, who worked at an airport.
- James Williams (Sherman Hemsley), Yvonne's father who still doesn't approve of Darryl; the two never get along with each other.
- Paulette Williams (Telma Hopkins), Yvonne's mother, who is less confrontational with Darryl.
- Shari Williams (Adele Givens), Yvonne's older sister. Like her father, she doesn't get along with Darryl.

== Episodes ==
The show spent two seasons on ABC, and it followed Home Improvement during its first season. The series was canceled when ABC decided to revamp its TGIF lineup. UPN picked up the show in the fall of 2000 and it aired in the Monday night lineup along with Moesha, The Parkers, and Girlfriends. While The Parkers and Girlfriends had improved ratings, The Hughleys did not over the next two years and aired its series finale after its fourth season.

The Hughleys ended with the two-part series finale "It's a Girl!" (aired May 13 and May 20, 2002). In this episode, Darryl Hughley's niece, Carly (guest star Kelly Rowland) is preparing for college (the college was unknown), with peace, tranquility and no expectation of her relatives coming to annoy her (implying the entire Hughleys clan). Carly then receives an unexpected visit from her cousins Sydney and Michael. Darryl and Milsap go to their twentieth high school reunion and Milsap learns that his "old" girlfriend, Shandra, has a child, and he is the father.

Season	Episodes	Originally released		
Season	Episodes	First released	Last released	Network
1	23	September 22, 1998	May 11, 1999	ABC
2	22	September 24, 1999	April 28, 2000	ABC
3	22	September 11, 2000	May 14, 2001	UPN
4	22	September 3, 2001	May 20, 2002	UPN

== Ratings ==
Season	Season premiere	Season finale	TV season	Ranking	Viewers (in millions)
1st	September 22, 1998	May 11, 1999	1998–1999	#37	12.4
2nd	September 24, 1999	April 28, 2000	1999–2000	#77	8.46
3rd	September 11, 2000	May 14, 2001	2000–2001	#130	3.4
4th	September 3, 2001	May 20, 2002	2001–2002	#135	3.6

== Rereleases ==
Reruns of The Hughleys started airing in syndication in mid-September 2002 to 2003, such as WWOR-TV who reran the show at 6:30 pm weeknights, replacing reruns of Sister, Sister from 2002 to 2003. The series aired on FXX from 2013–2017 in a widescreen form. On January 5, 2015, Bounce TV began airing reruns until it was removed in 2021. In August 2017, Aspire aired reruns until it was removed in 2022.

The series began streaming on Netflix and Hulu in September 2024. It later streamed on Tubi before getting removed on November 1, 2026.
