= Ashley Monique Clark =

American actress (born 1988)

- Born: December 1, 1988 (age 37)
- Occupation: Actress
- Years active: 1996–present
- Spouse: John Ivy (m. 2015)
- Children: 1

Ashley Monique Clark (born December 1, 1988) is an American actress best known for her role as Sydney Hughley (D. L. Hughley's TV daughter) on the ABC and UPN television sitcom, The Hughleys. She has received two NAACP Image Award nominations throughout her career and won a Young Artist Award in 1999.

== Career ==
Clark made her professional television debut in 1996 as a member of a Bluebird troop in an episode of The Fresh Prince of Bel-Air. The following year, she played a young version of Brandy Norwood's titular character on the sitcom, Moesha. Clark had a recurring role as Jaleen on the soap opera Sunset Beach where she appeared in eight episodes. She had a minor role in the 1997 film Liar Liar as a child at a party.

In 1998, she was cast as Sydney Hughley, the daughter of D. L. Hughley's character, in sitcom The Hughleys. The series aired on both ABC and UPN from 1998 to 2002. She received two NAACP Image Award nominations for Outstanding Youth Actor in 1999 and 2001 for portraying Sydney. Clark also won the Young Artist Award in 1999 for best performance in a TV comedy series (supporting young actress).

Shortly after The Hughleys ended in 2002, with a total of four seasons and 89 episodes, Clark appeared in Zoey 101 and Still Standing. She also had a supporting role in the movie Love Don't Cost a Thing (2003) as Aretha Johnson, in addition to a recurring role on The Bernie Mac Show as Teri, one of Vanessa's friends, from 2003 to 2006. She has also appeared on Hollywood Squares. Clark portrayed Kee Kee in the action film Domino (2005).

== Filmography ==
Film
Year	Title	Role	Notes
1997	Liar Liar	Child at Party and School	
2000	Bruno	Girl #2	uncredited; directed by Shirley MacLaine
2003	Love Don't Cost a Thing	Aretha Johnson	
2005	Domino	Kee Kee Rodriguez	

Television
Year	Title	Role	Notes
1996	The Parent 'Hood	Angela Davis	Episode: "I'm O'Tay, You're O-Tay"
1996	The Fresh Prince of Bel-Air	Blue Bird #3	Episode: "I, Bowl Buster"
1996	Encino Woman	Kindergartner	Television film
1997	Sunset Beach	Jaleen Muhammad	8 episodes
1997	Moesha	Young Moesha	Episode: "My Mom's Not an Ottoman"
1998–2002	The Hughleys	Sydney Hughley	4 seasons; 89 episodes
2001	Hollywood Squares	Herself	2 episodes
2003–2005	Still Standing	Kristin	3 episodes
2005	Zoey 101	Karen	2 episodes
2003–2006	The Bernie Mac Show	Teri	6 episodes
2008	ER	Keisha	Episode: "Believe the Unseen"
2008	Sons of Anarchy	Eviqua Michaels	4 episodes
2010	Big Time Rush	Soda Girl	2 episodes
2016	Angel from Hell	Waitress	Episode: "Practice Guy"
2022	All American: Homecoming	Maxine Vaughn	Episode: "Confessions"
2022	Family Reunion	Jillian Edwards	Episode: "Remember When Elvis Broke Jesus?"
2023	Lessons in Chemistry	Martha Wakeley	2 episodes
2024	The Upshaws	Stephanie	Episode: "Do I?"
