= Kiara Sasso =

Brazilian actress and singer (born 1979)

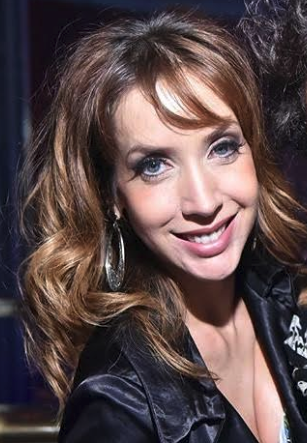
- Born: Chiara Francesca Perin Di Santolo Sasso; January 27, 1979 (age 47); Rio de Janeiro, Brazil
- Occupations: Actress, singer
- Years active: 1987–present

Kiara Sasso (born January 27, 1979) is a Brazilian actress and singer.

Having been brought up in both Redondo Beach, California, and Rio de Janeiro, Kiara found herself early on, in show business. At the age of eight she was on-camera, working as an extra or playing tiny parts in US commercials and TV shows. On one of her trips back to Brazil, Kiara began her stage work and her devotion for musical theater. Mainly working on stage, she played "Christine" in The Phantom of the Opera, "Belle" in Beauty and the Beast, Ellen in Miss Saigon, "Maria" in The Sound of Music, "Jeanie" in Hair and "Kitty" in The Drowsy Chaperone, amongst others.

In 2011 she played "Donna Sheridan" in the Brazilian production of Mamma Mia!.
