= Dee Jay Daniels =

American former television actor

- Born: October 17, 1988 (age 36); Montclair, California, U.S.
- Occupation: Actor
- Years active: 1995–2006, 2014

Dee Jay Daniels (born Dorjan Lyndell Daniels; October 17, 1988) is an American former television actor and rapper.

Daniels is best known for his role as Michael Hughley on the D. L. Hughley sitcom, The Hughleys, playing the son of Hughley's character. He also appeared in several shows including In the House, Coach, The Wayans Bros., Grace Under Fire and Cold Case. He also had a supporting role as Ethan in the 2005 Disney film, Sky High.

== Legal issues ==
Daniels was arrested for murder in Stockton, California in 2011 in the stabbing death of J.J. Lewis. He was acquitted on December 21, 2012.
