= Walter Latham =

American actor

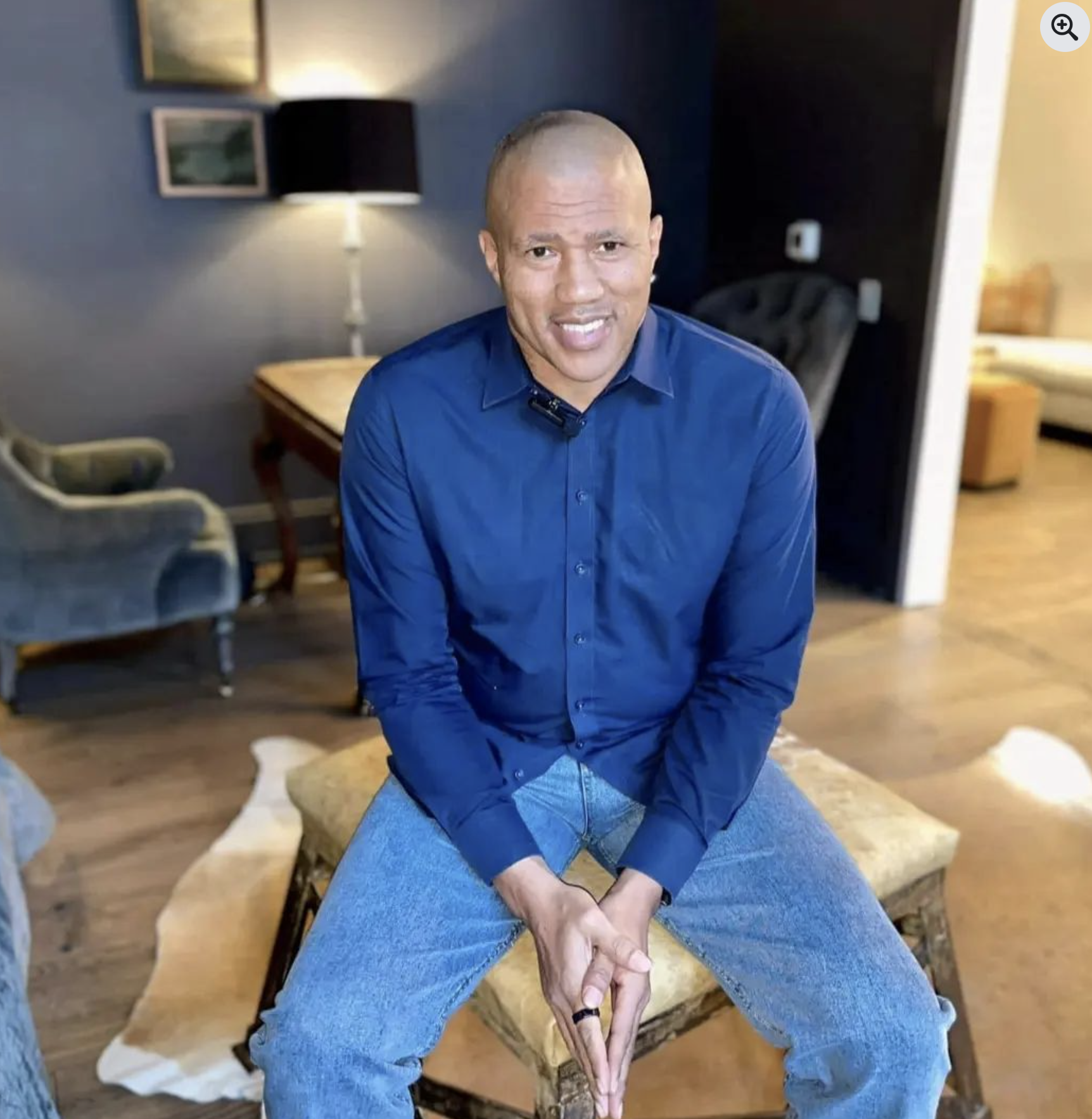
- Latham at the home offices of Walter Latham Entertainment, Inc.
- Born: December 13, 1970 (age 55); Brooklyn, New York, U.S.
- Website: http://www.walterlatham.com

Walter Latham (born December 13, 1970) is an American film and comedy producer born and raised in Brooklyn, New York. Latham, who is African-American, founded a comedy production company, Latham Entertainment, which helped launch the careers of noted comedians and comic actors, including Bernie Mac, Steve Harvey, and Mo'Nique. His releases, The Original Kings of Comedy, Queens of Comedy, Latham Entertainment Presents, and Bad Boys of Comedy have grossed more than $250 million worldwide. He currently resides in Franklin, TN with his wife and business partner, Yulonda.

== Early life ==
An African-American, Walter Latham was born in Brooklyn, New York, where he was raised in a single-parent home with his mother and younger sister. From childhood, he listened to the comedy albums of Eddie Murphy and Richard Pryor. In search of a better life, he moved to North Carolina in his teens but found life there to be equally as difficult. Guided by his own passion for comedy, Latham dropped out of East Carolina University at age 20 to start a promotion company and produce comedy shows. Walter started the company with a $4000 loan and the support of his mother. His first show failed because the talent he booked failed to show up. Latham did not let this setback deter him. He went on to produce many highly successful comedy tours across the nation.

== Career ==
In December 1997, Walter Latham took a group of black comedians who would in time be known as the Kings of Comedy on tour. Steadfastly believing that packaging a number of popular comedians would be wildly successful, Latham mounted a triple-headliner tour starring Steve Harvey, Cedric the Entertainer, and Bernie Mac. In 1999, the addition of D.L. Hughley and the sponsorship of HBO brought the total grosses over $37 million in two years.

Latham decided to capture the experience of the live Kings of Comedy Tour on film. The Original Kings of Comedy was directed by Spike Lee and produced by Latham Entertainment and MTV films. The film was produced on an estimated $3,000,000 budget. On its opening weekend, Kings of Comedy grossed a total of $11,053,832 on 847 screens, averaging to about $13,051 per venue. The tour grossed over $18 million in its first year. The Original Kings of Comedy eventually grossed a total of $38,168,022 at the box offices.

== Filmography ==
Film
Year	Film	Featured Comedians	Notes
2000	The Original Kings of Comedy	Steve Harvey, Bernie Mac, Cedric The Entertainer, D.L. Hughley	Film grossed over $37 million during its run at the box office. It is the 2nd highest grossing comedy stand-up film of all time. Nominated for NAACP Image Award for Outstanding Motion Picture; Soundtrack nominated for a Grammy for the Best Spoken Comedy Album in 2000
2001	Runteldat	Martin Lawrence	Tour grossed more than $7M opening weekend and is the 4th highest grossing stand-up film in history.

Comedy Tours
Year(s)	Tour Name	Featured Comedians	Notes
1992	Schlitz Malt Liquor Tour	D.L. Hughley and Bernie Mac	
1993	Zima Clear Malt Comedy Jam	Bill Bellamy and Chris Tucker	
1995	What About Me	Chris Tucker	
1997–1999	Kings of Comedy	Steve Harvey, Bernie Mac, Cedric The Entertainer	Tour grossed more than $18 Million in its first year.
2000–2001	Queens of Comedy	Mo'Nique, Sommore, Adele Givens, Laura Hayes	
2001	Runteldat	Martin Lawrence	
2002–2003	Latham Entertainment Presents	J Anthony Brown, Earthquake, Bruce Bruce, Sommore, D. L. Hughley	Released to DVD 2003
2003	Crown Royal Comedy Soul Festival	Rickey Smiley, Earthquake, Bruce Bruce, Adele Givens	

Television
Year	Title	Network	Featured Comedians/Hosts	Notes
1996–1997	Bring The Pain	HBO	Chris Rock	
2001	Queens of Comedy	Showtime	Mo'Nique, Sommore, Adele Givens, Laura Hayes	The special was Showtime's highest rated special in 2001
2005–2007	P.Diddy Presents The Bad Boys of Comedy Seasons 1 & 2	HBO	MC'd by Doug E. Fresh	Co-Executive Produced by Latham Entertainment. Nominated for BET Comedy Award in "Outstanding Comedy Variety Series" category.
2008	Shaken Not Stirred	MyNetwork TV	Hosts: D.L. Hughley, Anthony Anderson, Paul Rodriguez, John Salley	5 Episodes; Toastees included Reverend Al Sharpton, Pamela Anderson, Bobby Brown, Ice-T and Rev Run
2012	Comedy After Dark	Walter Latham Comedy (YouTube)	Hosts: Jenna Jameson, Trina, Rosa Acosta, Carolina Catalino	24 Episodes; YouTube Original Content
