= Rodney Perry =

American comedian, actor and writer (born 1970)

- Born: September 15, 1970 (age 55); Chicago, Illinois, U.S.
- Years active: 2000–present
- Known for: The Mo'Nique Show; Who's Got Jokes?
- Website: rodneyperry.com

Rodney Perry (born September 15, 1970) is an American comedian, actor and writer. He is most known for serving as co-host on BET's late night talk show The Mo'Nique Show where he provided laughs alongside actress and comedian Mo'Nique five nights a week from October 5, 2009, until the show ended on August 16, 2011.

== Early life ==
Born in Chicago and raised in Monroe, Perry found his way to comedy by way of the United States Navy, where he performed to some of his toughest audiences. He eventually moved to San Francisco Bay Area where he honed his comedic craft and perfected his stage show, which includes observations on everything from the workplace to the joys and occasional pains of raising a big family.

== Career ==
For four seasons, Perry has served as co-host and Man on the Street for TV One's comedy competition Bill Bellamy's Who's Got Jokes? He's also appeared on HBO's Def Comedy Jam, BET's Comic View, Showtime's Jamie Foxx's Laffapalooza, Starz Network's Martin Lawrence Presents First Amendment Stand-Up, E! Network's Chelsea Lately and Byron Allen's Comics Unleashed. On the big screen, Perry joined Tyler Perry and a host of stars in Tyler Perry's 2011 film Tyler Perry's Madea's Big Happy Family. Perry has also teamed up with Tony Rock in the film The Last Laugh, a drama about comedy. In addition to his nightly role on The Mo'Nique Show, Perry constantly tours with his stand-up act. He is currently preparing to shoot his first comedy special, Rodney Perry All the Way Live, in summer 2011.

== Filmography ==
=== Film ===
| Year | Title | Role | Notes |
|---|---|---|---|
| 2003 | With or Without You | Guard #1 | |
| 2003 | Livin' tha Life | Uncle Fred | Video |
| 2003 | Malibooty! | Pablo | Video |
| 2004 | Johnson Family Vacation | Cousin Lump | |
| 2004 | Out on Parole | Mask | Video |
| 2005 | Wifey | Icky | Video |
| 2005 | Jepardee! | Tyrone Watkins | Short |
| 2005 | Flip The Script | Hot Sauce | |
| 2005 | Tears of a Clown | Darryl | |
| 2005 | So Fresh, So Clean... a Down and Dirty Comedy | Lovey | |
| 2006 | Near Mrs. | Stacy | Short |
| 2007 | Business Johnson | Delmar | Short |
| 2007 | Redrum | Otis | |
| 2008 | Smokeless | - | Short |
| 2008 | Show Stoppers | Don't Cuss | |
| 2008 | Legacy | Jaul | Video |
| 2008 | I'm Every Woman | - | Short |
| 2009 | Truly Blessed | Pastor Jenkins | |
| 2009 | From the 9th Ward | Smitty | Short |
| 2009 | The Adventures of Umbweki | Medicine Man | |
| 2010 | Baby Mama's Club | Blake | |
| 2011 | Madea's Big Happy Family | Harold | |
| 2011 | Slice 2 | Phony Producer | |
| 2011 | Dance Fu | Mayor Pope | |
| 2012 | The Chamber | Coach Felt | Short |
| 2012 | C'mon Man | Hubert Davis | |
| 2012 | Raising Izzie | Guard | TV movie |
| 2013 | Love Will Keep Us Together | Earnest | TV movie |
| 2013 | In the Meantime | Alijuanbiwazinga Jones | TV movie |
| 2013 | Slice 3 | Burnt Orange | |
| 2014 | Core: A Short Film About Bullying | Dr. Blackwell | Short |
| 2014 | The Productive Lie | Lester | |
| 2014 | A Song for Jordan | Lance Taylor | Short |
| 2015 | What Love Will Make You Do | Cousin Ben | |
| 2015 | Blaq Gold | William Burrell | TV movie |
| 2015 | Mr. Right | Frank | |
| 2015 | Soul Ties | Bartender | |
| 2015 | Civilian Life | Mr. Wiley | |
| 2016 | Rabidus | Detective Sean Anderson | |
| 2016 | Loose Screws | Uncle Clarence | |
| 2016 | To Love the Soul of a Woman | Frank Sanders | |
| 2016 | DigitalLivesMatter | Pops | |
| 2016 | Not Another Black Movie | Martin Cole | |
| 2017 | Dirty South House Arrest | Mr. Bookman | |
| 2017 | Conflict of Interest | Tristin | |
| 2017 | Once Upon a Time in Detroit | Detective Mitchell | |
| 2018 | The Products of the American Ghetto | Cowboy | |
| 2018 | Hey, Mr. Postman! | Frank Crawford | |
| 2018 | Real Logic | - | Short |
| 2018 | Coins for Christmas | Mr. Cannon | TV movie |
| 2018 | Before You Say I Do Live! | Nate | |
| 2020 | Heaven On Seven | Pastor Swanson | |
| 2020 | True You | Earl Worthman | |
| 2021 | Coming 2 America | Cousin | |
| 2021 | HIStory | Mr. Justin Black | Short |
| 2021 | Ayanna Shon's Christmas Hypnosis | Ced | |
| 2022 | Devon's Day: A Juneteenth Story | Lester | Short |
| 2022 | Easter Sunday | Father Hildo | |
| 2023 | Socially Distanced | Glen | |
| 2023 | Recession Proof | Pastor Hicks | |
| 2023 | Can't Get Rite | Officer Bufford Black | |
| 2023 | The Pass | Big J | |
| 2023 | The Bad Visitor | Marcus | |
| 2023 | The Drone That Saved Christmas | Barry Bryant | |
| 2023 | A Thanksgiving Christmas | One Tyme | |
| 2023 | Double Dekoi | Officer Larry | |
| 2023 | My Christmas Threesome | Curtis | |
| 2023 | Generational Gap | Himself | |
| 2023 | He Who Findeth | Gabe | |
| 2024 | Finding Tony | Mr. Parks | |
| 2024 | Eye for an Eye | Pigeon Toe Perry | |
| 2025 | South Haven | Thomas | |

=== Television ===
| Year | Title | Role | Notes |
|---|---|---|---|
| 2000 | It's Showtime at the Apollo | Himself | Episode: "Nelly/Rodney Perry" |
| 2001-12 | ComicView | Himself | Recurring Guest |
| 2003 | Laffapalooza | Himself | Episode: "Episode #1.3" |
| 2006 | The Tom Joyner Show | Himself | Episode: "Episode #1.13" |
| 2006 | Def Comedy Jam | Himself | Episode: "Episode #7.10" |
| 2006-09 | Bill Bellamy's Who's Got Jokes? | Himself/Co-Host | Main Co-Host |
| 2008 | Baisden After Dark | Himself/Panelist | Episode: "Getting Lazy After Marriage" |
| 2008 | 1st Amendment Stand Up | Himself | Episode: "Rodney Perry/Bruce Bruce/Deon Cole" |
| 2008 | The Rodney Perry Show | Himself/Host | Main Host |
| 2009 | Nite Tales: The Series | Cleophius | Episode: "Night Watch" |
| 2009-11 | The Mo'Nique Show | Himself/Co-Host | Main Co-Host |
| 2010 | The Big Black Comedy Show | Himself | Episode: "Let's Begin to Win in 2010" |
| 2011 | The Celibate Nympho Chronicles: The Web Series | Reggie | Episode: "I Promise Nothing Will Happen" |
| 2011 | Love Atlanta Style | The Doctor | Episode: "Trip to the Clinic" |
| 2012 | Uptown Comic | Himself | Episode: "Episode #1.1" |
| 2012 | Off the Chain | Himself/Host | Main Host |
| 2014 | Love That Girl! | Sherman | Episode: "Mo' Money, Mo' Problems" |
| 2014-18 | Family Time | Rodney | Recurring Cast: Season 2-6 |
| 2017 | Unsung | Himself | Episode: "Case" |
| 2017 | About Him 2: The Revolution | Mayor | Episode: "Knee Deep in Oppression" |
| 2019 | Tales | Security Guard | Episode: "My Life" |
| 2020 | Produce Your Own Life | Himself | Episode: "Mama, My Name is Famous" |
| 2020 | Main Street Review | Himself | Main Cast |
| 2020 | Reckless Enlightenment | Multiple | Episode: "Prayer for Strength" |
| 2021 | The Urbans | Randy | Episode: "The Good Broccoli Part 1 & 2" |
| 2021 | Live & In Color | Drunk Man | Episode: "Episode 1" |
| 2022 | Our Kind of People | Minister | Episode: "It Is Not Light We Need, But Fire" |

=== Documentary ===
| Year | Title |
|---|---|
| 2008 | History of the Joke |
| 2013 | A Funny Thing Happened on the Way to the White House |
| 2014 | The Swirl |

=== Comedy Special ===
| Year | Title |
|---|---|
| 2011 | Rodney Perry Nothing But the Truth |
