= The Bounce Back =

- Theatrical release poster
- Directed by: Youssef Delara
- Screenplay by: Youssef Delara; Staci Robinson; Victor Teran
- Based on: The Bounce Back Book by Karen Salmansohn
- Produced by: Ray Brown; Amir Delara; Youssef Delara; Victor Teran; Shemar Moore
- Starring: Shemar Moore; Nadine Velazquez; Bill Bellamy; Sheryl Underwood; Kali Hawk
- Cinematography: Ben Kufrin
- Edited by: Youssef Delara
- Music by: Reza Safinia
- Production companies: Ankle Sock & Baseball Pants; Cima Productions
- Distributed by: Viva Pictures Distribution
- Release date: December 9, 2016 (United States)
- Running time: 104 minutes
- Country: United States
- Language: English
- Budget: $3 million
- Box office: $421,404

The Bounce Back is a 2016 American romantic comedy film directed by Youssef Delara and is loosely inspired by The Bounce Back Book by Karen Salmansohn. The film stars Shemar Moore, Nadine Velazquez, Bill Bellamy, Sheryl Underwood, and Kali Hawk. Viva Pictures Distribution released the film on December 9, 2016.

== Plot ==
Matthew Taylor (Shemar Moore), a father, author, and relationship expert is on a book tour promoting his new best-selling book, The Bounce Back. He has everything figured out until he meets the acerbic Kristin Peralta (Nadine Velazquez), a talk show circuit therapist who is convinced that he is nothing but a charlatan. Matthew's life is turned upside down when he inadvertently falls for Kristin and faces the painful truth of his past relationship.

== Cast ==
- Shemar Moore as Matthew Taylor
- Nadine Velazquez as Kristin Peralta
- Bill Bellamy as Terry Twist
- Sheryl Underwood as Nina
- Kali Hawk as Jessica Williams
- Matthew Willig as Vladamir
- Michael Beach as George
- Vanessa Bell Calloway as Ellen
- Nishi Munshi as Haifa
- Denise Boutte as Julie
- Megan Stevenson as Sarah
- Robinne Lee as Sam
- Nadja Alaya as Aleya Taylor

== Release ==
The Bounce Back was released on December 9, 2016, in the United States in 615 theaters.

=== Box office ===
The Bounce Back was released alongside Office Christmas Party along with the wide expansions of Miss Sloane and Nocturnal Animals, and was expected to gross $1.3 million from 615 theaters in its opening weekend. However, it only grossed $227,354 in its opening weekend, making it the 31st worst opening for a wide release in movie history. The film grossed $321,910 in the United States and Canada and $99,494 in other territories for a worldwide total of $421,404.

== Reception ==
On review aggregator website Rotten Tomatoes, the film has an approval rating of 67%, based on 6 reviews, with an average rating of 5.8/10.
