= Donna Richardson =

American fitness instructor

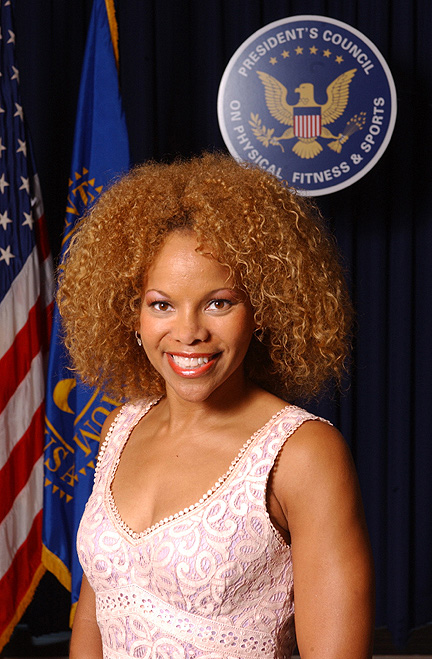

Personal information
- Full name: Donna Richardson Joyner
- Born: November 3, 1962 (age 64) Silver Spring, Maryland, U.S.
- Occupations: Fitness instructor, sports commentator, President's Council on Physical Fitness and Sports
- Updated on March 17, 2009

Donna Richardson Joyner (born November 3, 1962) is an American fitness and aerobics instructor, author and ESPN television sports commentator. Widely known for her series of fitness videos, she was appointed in 2006 by President George W. Bush to serve on the President's Council on Physical Fitness and Sports. She also produces and hosts Donna Richardson: Mind, Body, & Spirit, which airs on TV One, and Sweating In The Spirit, which airs on The Word Network.

She has served on the Women's Sports Foundation Board of Trustees and is an Advisory Board Member for the Boys and Girls Clubs of America.

== Early life and education ==
Richardson is a native of Silver Spring, Maryland where she graduated from Montgomery Blair High School. She was Blair's first African-American homecoming queen. She graduated from Hollins College with a degree in Health Education and Dance.

== Personal life ==
Richardson met popular syndicated radio personality Tom Joyner in 1997 after being a guest on his radio show. They became engaged one year later in August 1998, while in Philadelphia en route to the airport. On July 29, 2000, Richardson married Joyner in Montego Bay, Jamaica and had a week-long honeymoon in Venice, Italy. Richardson and Tom Joyner separated in May 2012

== Fitness career ==
Certified by AFAA and ACE as an International Fitness Expert, Richardson-Joyner began her fitness career as an aerobics instructor, after responding to a challenge to take an aerobics class. She eventually moved on to teach other instructors. Eventually she began to compete nationally and internationally in aerobics competitions.

In 1992, she was hired as a co-host of the ESPN Fitness Pros Show and co-starred in her first commercial fitness tape, Platinum Buns of Steel.

Richardson Joyner was selected by The Oprah Winfrey Show as one of the "Top 5 Fitness Video Instructors". She was selected by Fitness magazine as one of their "Top 10 Movers and Shakers" and was inducted into the National Fitness Hall of Fame.

Richardson Joyner not only was the star of Sweating in the Spirit, she was also the executive producer.

Richardson Joyner has lectured in 40 countries and has been a featured motivational speaker with several national tours including God's Leading Ladies, Sisters In The Spirit and the Pantene Total You.

Donna was named by Essence magazine for being “one out of 25 most inspiring women in America” in 2006.

Richardson Joyner is in the Guinness Book of World Records for creating and leading the world's largest line dance, with over 50,000 participants at Megafest hosted by Bishop T. D. Jakes in Atlanta, Georgia.

== Print/media ==
=== Books ===
Year	Title	Publisher	Other notes
March 1, 1998	Let's Get Real: Exercise Your Right to a Healthy Body	Pocket Books	

=== Visual media ===
==== DVDs ====
Year	Title	Publisher	Other notes
1999	Donna Richardson: 3-Day Rotation 2000	Anchor Bay	
2003	Sweating In The Spirit	Razor & Tie	gospel exercise video featuring live performances by Kirk Franklin, Yolanda Adams, and Shirley Murdock
2006	Sweating In The Spirit 2	Razor & Tie	features music performed by a live band and vocal renditions by Byron Cage, Martha Munizzi and RiZen

=== VHS videocassettes ===
Year	Title	Publisher	Other notes
2006	Old School Dance Party	Donnamite Productions	features rappers The Sugarhill Gang
1995	4-Day Rotation Workout	Anchor Bay Entertainment	
1995	Donna-Mite Aerobic Workout	Anchor Bay Entertainment	
	30 Days to Firmer Abs & Arms	Anchor Bay Entertainment	
	Donna Richardson - 30 Days To Thinner Thighs	Anchor Bay Entertainment	
	Back to Basics	Anchor Bay Entertainment	
	Step & Awesome Abs	Anchor Bay Entertainment	
1993	Donna Richardson - Attitude Aerobics	Anchor Bay Entertainment	
	Platinum Series: Thighs of Steel 2000	Warner Home Video	With Tamilee Webb, Tracy York
1994	Perfect Balance Workout	Anchor Bay Entertainment	
	Platinum Series: Buns of Steel 2000	Warner Home Video	With Tamilee Webb, Tracy York
	Platinum Series: Arms & Abs of Steel 2000	Maier Group	With Tamilee Webb, Tracy York
2006	The Brazilian Workout		
