= Nikki Woods =

American television producer

- Born: Rock Hill, Missouri
- Children: Tyler, Willow
- Presenting career
- Show: The Tom Joyner Morning Show
- Network: Syndicated
- Style: Talk, urban adult contemporary, R&B/soul
- Country: United States
- Website: www.nikkiwoodsmedia.com

Nikki Woods is an American radio producer based in Dallas, Texas and best known for her work as the senior producer on the nationally syndicated Tom Joyner Morning Show. She is also a personal branding coach, social media consultant, author, motivational speaker and voice-over artist.

== Early life and college ==
Woods was born in Rock Hill, Missouri, a suburb of St. Louis. She explored many different career options as an adolescent but ultimately decided to study education and subsequently enrolled at Howard University in pursuit of that goal. However, Woods discovered during her time teaching in Missouri and in Jamaica that education was not her true passion and returned home to Rock Hill to weigh other professional options.

While back home in Missouri, Woods began to pay more attention to how people earned their livings and which of those career fields overlapped with her strengths. This period of introspection coincided with her increased exposure to Magic 108 in St. Louis and sparked her interest in the world of broadcast journalism; Woods was fascinated by the opportunity Disc Jockeys had to regularly speak to so many people on such an intimate level. This newfound interest sent Woods back to school, this time at University of St. Francis in Joliet, Illinois where she graduated with a BA in journalism and a concentration in broadcast journalism in 1995.

== Early career ==
After graduating from the University of St. Francis, Woods got her first job in radio as a co-host and news director at WILD in Boston, a station that at the time served as a staple amongst the Boston area African American community for being a reliable outlet for R&B and its subgenres. It has since converted to air programming from China Radio International.

Woods stayed at WILD for only one year, then moved back to the Midwest and landed a job at the legendary Chicago urban radio station WGCI. Here, she co-hosted the Crazy Howard McGee morning show and produced news & traffic for 10 years until station ownership controversially replaced GCI's local morning show with the nationally syndicated Steve Harvey Morning Show.

== Tom Joyner Morning Show ==
Once the Crazy Howard McGee morning show staff and crew were ousted from WGCI, Woods began working at the nationally syndicated Tom Joyner Morning Show in 2008, an urban program broadcast to approximately 8 million listeners daily in more than 115 U.S. markets. In her new setting, she transitioned away from hosting and into the role of producer, working predominantly behind the scenes though she does occasionally make appearances on the TJMS airwaves to contribute "info-tainment" on weekend activities and events, as well as through Joyner's online TV series Mama's Gone Wild and Beyond the Studio. Though she is no longer based in Chicago, Woods can still be heard through TJMS’ Chicago affiliate, WSRB Soul 106.3, where she contributes regularly to the station's TJMS Community Watch program.

Woods’ efforts have won her praise from many in the world of radio, including from Tom Joyner, himself known as "the hardest working man in radio", who's called Woods "the hardest working senior producer in radio."

== Nikki Woods Media ==
In addition to her work on the Tom Joyner Morning Show, Woods runs her own business Nikki Woods Media. Woods’ primary service under this company is training her clients, which range from everyday individuals to corporations, in effective personal branding, message delivery, and platform development. This training takes form in one-on-one coaching sessions as well speaking engagements at workshops and large events.

Wood's work through her own company has earned her a reputation as a "Global Visibility Expert", a reputation supported by her books, Top Twitter Tips for Global Visibility and Quick and Dirty Twitter Tips to Global Visibility, both of which focus on increasing visibility via the social network website Twitter.

== Literary works ==
Woods has published one fiction work and is currently in the process of writing her second novel. Her first – a romance novel titled Easier Said Than Done originally published by Ebony Energy in 2005 and recently reissued by Brown Girls Publishing in 2014 – follows an entertainment executive struggling to balance family and career all at once. The novel received positive reviews, averaging 4 out of 5 stars on goodreads.com and 4½ out of 5 stars on Amazon.

== Ambassadorships ==
Separate from her own professional endeavors, Woods is an ambassador for Pretty Brown Girls Inc., a movement that empowers and inspires girls and women to celebrate their shades of brown, as well as for Oprah Winfrey’s OWN network.

== Awards ==
Woods was named the ME&WE Inc Woman of the Year in 2013.

== Personal life ==
Woods lives with her two children, Tyler and Willow, in Dallas, Texas.
