= The Queens of Comedy =

2000 film by Steve Purcell

- Directed by: Steve Purcell
- Written by: Laura Hayes; Adele Givens; Sommore; Mo'Nique
- Produced by: Steve Purcell; Walter Latham
- Starring: Laura Hayes; Adele Givens; Sommore; Mo'Nique
- Production company: Latham Entertainment
- Distributed by: Paramount Pictures
- Release date: February 20, 2001
- Running time: 79 minutes
- Country: United States
- Language: English

The Queens of Comedy is a 2001 American stand-up comedy film directed by Steve Purcell that is a direct spin-off film of The Original Kings of Comedy, both of which were produced by Walter Latham. The film follows the performances and behind-the-scenes conversations of four black, female stand-up comedians at Memphis, Tennessee's Orpheum Theatre.

Laura Hayes opens the show and serves as MC. She tells family stories about her grandchildren, her mother, and her sisters. Adele Givens urges her audience to celebrate their flaws; she comments on this crazy world, her 92-year-old grandmother, and the need to take care when naming a baby.

Sommore, recently released from jail, talks about children, men, marriage, and why mothers give their eight-year old daughters a hula-hoop. Lastly, Mo'Nique celebrates big women and contrasts blacks and whites. She tries to give big women hope, that it is ok to be a big woman, and it is ok to dislike skinny women.

The film also cuts to footage of the queens on the town having fun. For one night only, eight years later, the ladies returned for a comeback on The Mo'Nique Show, which aired on October 29, 2009.

== Airing ==
The Queens of Comedy premiered on Showtime in the United States. It has aired internationally in Europe, the United Kingdom and Ireland, and it has been subtitled in Germany, the Netherlands and Sweden. In Africa, it aired in South Africa, Ghana, Liberia, and Nigeria.
