= Livin' the Life =

Livin' the Life may refer to:

- Livin' the Life (album), by Chris and Lorin Rowan
- Livin' the Life, an album by Elbert West

== See also ==
- Livin' tha Life, a 2003 American film
- Living the Life, a British television talk show
