= Greg Smithey =

American fitness and aerobics instructor

Greg Smithey is an American physical fitness and aerobics instructor. He created The Original Buns of Steel workout in 1987 with actress Tamilee Webb. In The Original Buns of Steel, Smithey leads viewers through a series of exercises devoted to strengthening, tightening, toning, growing and shaping the buttocks, thighs and upper legs. Smithey incorporates the lower body strengthening exercises he used to train for vaulting into his workout. Over one million copies of Smithey's workout were sold on VHS tape by The Maier Group (later acquired by A*Vision). Smithey's projects include re-launching a DVD version of his Original Buns of Steel at the Original Buns of Steel official website. Greg Smithey has a BA in physical education, an MA in education and is certified by IDEA as a fitness instructor.

Smithey originally competed as a pole vaulter, jumping 5.10 metres in Idaho in 1973.
