= ComicView =

American stand-up comedy TV show

- Created by: Curtis Gadson
- Starring: See hosts section below
- Country of origin: United States
- Original language: English

Production
- Production locations: Atlanta; Houston; Los Angeles; Miami; New Orleans
- Running time: Original series: 45–48 minutes Revived series: 30 minutes

Original release
- Network: BET
- Release: September 14, 1992 – December 17, 2008
- Release: May 6 – September 30, 2014

Comic View is an American stand-up comedy show that aired on BET on Tuesdays and Fridays from September 1992 to December 2008. In May 2014, BET announced the return of Comic View. The show has been the launching pad for such comedians as D. L. Hughley, Cedric the Entertainer, Sommore, and Rodney Perry.

== Overview ==
In the show's later years, the show moved to different cities, such as Atlanta, Los Angeles, Miami and New Orleans.

The episodes aired during the 2005–2006 season were filmed in New Orleans less than a month before Hurricane Katrina. Before the show aired, a message dedicated the show to the citizens of New Orleans. Another incarnation entitled Comic View: One Mic Stand began in September 2008 with actor Kevin Hart as the host. Its recent incarnation was renamed back to Comic View which began in May 2014 with comedian Sommore returning as the new host.

== Hosts ==
- D. L. Hughley (1992–1994)
- Cedric the Entertainer (1994–1995)
- Sommore (1995–1996; 2014)
- Don "D.C." Curry (1996–1997; 2013)
- Montana Taylor (1997–1998)
- Gary Owen (1998–1999)
- Lester Barrie (1999–2000)
- Rickey Smiley (2000–2001)
- Bruce Bruce (New Orleans 10th Anniversary Party Gras, 2000–2002)
- Arnez J (Caliente, 2002–2003)
- J. Anthony Brown (2003–2004)
- Sheryl Underwood (2005–2006)
- Kevin Hart (One Mic Stand, 2008)

== References in pop culture ==
- The program was mentioned by Cam'Ron in his song "Tomorrow" ("Clowns, they belong on ComicView ")
- The program was also mentioned on the 11th episode of the first season of Chappelle's Show. An aged Asian man tells Dave Chappelle his camera will show him things some "would pay not to see." Dave responds, in kind, by asking "Oh snap, it gets ComicView?"
- The program was mentioned by Nas in his song "2nd Childhood" off of his Stillmatic album. ("He break his mom's furniture, watching ComicView ").
- The program was mentioned by Fabolous in his song "Jokes on You" off his From Nothin' to Somethin' album. ("But ok, you B.E.T. only if its Comic View ").
- The program was mentioned by Timbo King in a song by Bronze Nazareth called "More Than Gold" off of Bronze's The Great Migration album. ("You ain't nice as hell, you a ComicView rapper you should write for Chappelle ").
- The program was mentioned in the 4th episode of the third season of the Netflix series Dear White People and has apparently not aged well according to a character.
