= Bill Bellamy =

American actor and stand-up comedian (born 1965)

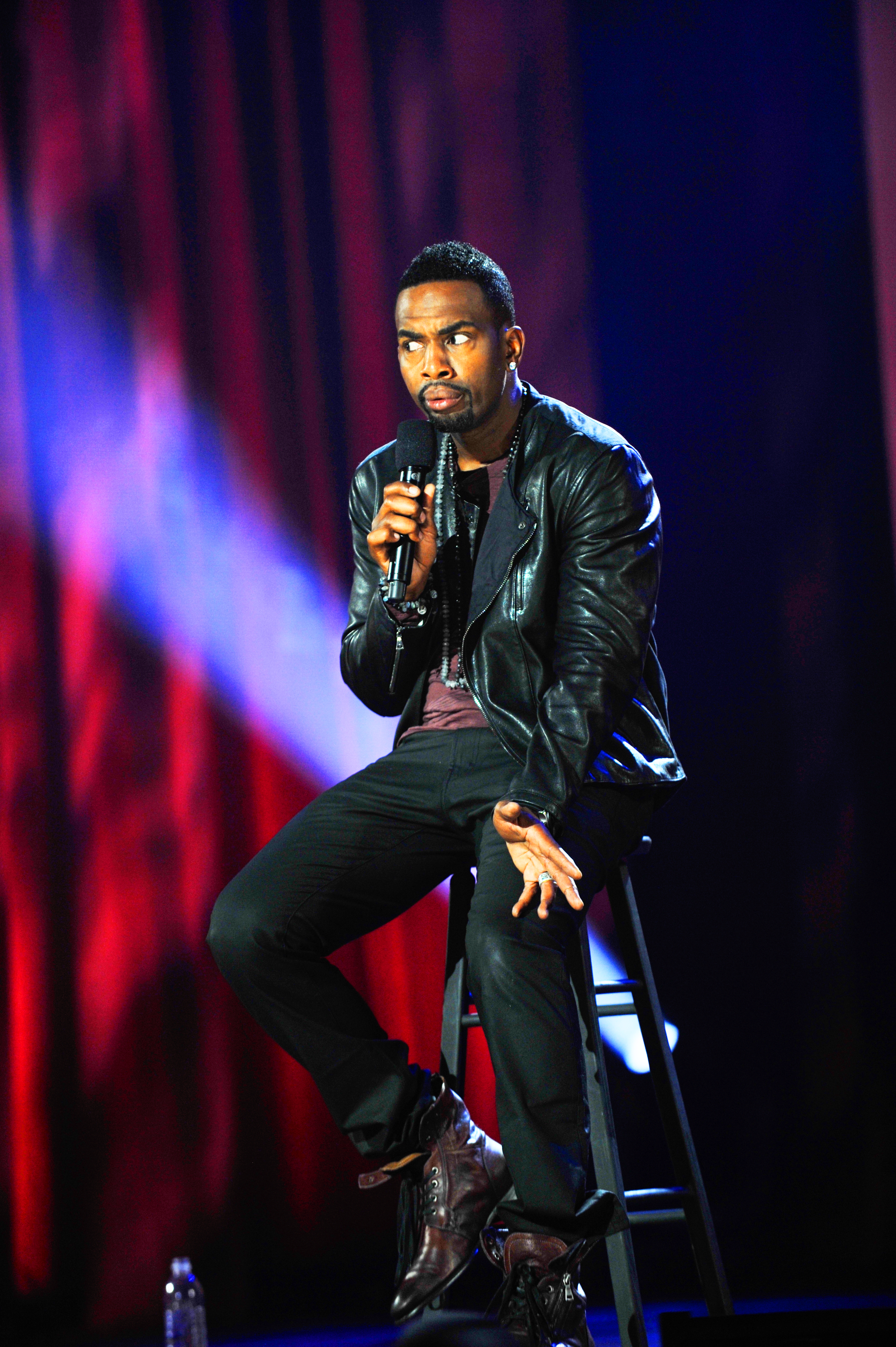
- Bellamy in 2011
- Born: William Bellamy; April 7, 1965 (age 61); Newark, New Jersey, U.S.
- Education: Rutgers University (BEcon)
- Occupations: Actor; comedian
- Years active: 1985–present
- Spouse: Kristen Baker (m. 2001)
- Children: 2
- Relatives: Shaquille O'Neal (cousin)

William Bellamy (born April 7, 1965) is an American actor and stand-up comedian. Bellamy first gained national notoriety on HBO's Russell Simmons' Def Comedy Jam, where he is credited for creating or coining the phrase "booty call", described as a late night call to a potential paramour with the intention of meeting strictly for sex.

== Early life and education ==
William Bellamy was born on April 7, 1965 in Newark, New Jersey. His cousin is basketball player Shaquille O'Neal.

Bellamy attended Seton Hall Preparatory School in South Orange, New Jersey. He then majored in economics at Rutgers University.

== Career ==
For many years, Bellamy was a staple on MTV, a VJ and the host of several MTV programs including MTV Jams and MTV Beach House. He went on to star in a number of movies, including Fled, Love Jones, The Brothers, How to Be a Player, Getting Played and Any Given Sunday. He also appeared on two episodes of the TV show Kenan & Kel. Additionally, he voiced Skeeter on the Nickelodeon television show Cousin Skeeter.

In 2002, Bellamy had a co-starring role in the Fox Network television show Fastlane alongside Peter Facinelli and Tiffani Thiessen. He also appeared frequently as a "roundtable" guest on the late night E! talk show Chelsea Lately. Bellamy hosted seasons 5 and 6 of NBC's Last Comic Standing reality show (2007 and 2008). In 2014, he had a recurring role as Councilman Powell on the TV Land original series Hot in Cleveland. He voiced Marcus Hill, a playable character in the 2005 updated version of the NARC video game.

In 2016, Bellamy played FBI Agent Sanders, the partner of Dolph Lundgren's character, in Kindergarten Cop 2.

Bellamy hosted Bill Bellamy's Who's Got Jokes? on TV One. He was also an executive producer for it. In 2020, he starred in the Netflix miniseries Self Made.

== Personal life ==
Bellamy married his wife Kristen Baker on 16 June 2001 at the Hotel Casa del Mar in Santa Monica, California. They have two children together.

== Filmography ==
=== Film ===
Year	Title	Role	Notes
1993	Joey Breaker	Ace Man	
1993	Who's the Man?	K.K.	
1996	Fled	Ray	
1997	Love Jones	Hollywood	
1997	Austin Powers' Electric Psychedelic Pussycat Swingers Club	The Swingers Club	TV movie
1997	How to Be a Player	Drayton Jackson	
1999	Love Stinks	Larry Garnett	
1999	Any Given Sunday	Jimmy Sanderson	
2001	The Brothers	Brian Palmer	
2002	Three Big Words	-	Short
2002	Buying the Cow	Jonesy	
2005	Neverwas	Martin Sands	
2005	The Real Mario Grey	Dr. Getty	Short
2006	Getting Played	Mark Sellers	TV movie
2010	Lottery Ticket	Giovanni Watson	
2012	Noobz	Brian Bankrupt Simmons	
2013	10 Rules for Sleeping Around	Dwayne	
2016	Kindergarten Cop 2	Sanders	
2016	The Bounce Back	Terry Jackson	
2019	Twenty to One	Narrator	TV movie
2020	A Dark Foe	Rocco	
2021	A Rich Christmas	Marshall Rich	TV movie
2023	House Party	Pops	
2023	Back on the Strip	Tyriq 'Da Face' Cox	
2025	#WorstChristmasever	Larry Vann	

=== Television ===
Year	Title	Role	Notes
1989	The Play on One	Antique Dealer	Episode: "Heartland"
1991–1995	It's Showtime at the Apollo	Himself	Recurring guest
1992	Def Comedy Jam	Himself	Episodes: "Episode #1.4" & "#2.6"
1993	MTV Beach House	Himself/Host	Main host: Season 1
1996	Baywatch	Himself	Episode: "Beachblast"
1997	Soul Train Lady of Soul Awards	Himself/co-host	Main co-host
1998	Figure It Out	Cousin Skeeter (voice)	Episode: "Bags Groceries Dad Buys in Record Time"
1998–2001	Cousin Skeeter	Skeeter	Main cast
1999	Kenan & Kel	Himself	Guest cast: Seasons 3-4
2000	The Jamie Foxx Show	Andre	Episode: "Partner fo' Life"
2001	Hollywood Squares	Himself/Panelist	Recurring panelist
2001–2002	Men, Women & Dogs	Jeremiah	Main cast
2002–2003	Fastlane	Deaqon "Deaq" Hayes	Main cast
2004	Half & Half	James Lewis	Episode: "The Big Birth-Date Episode"
2005	I Love the '90s: Part Deux	Himself	Episode: "1996"
2006	Def Comedy Jam	Himself	Episode: "Episode #7.8"
2006	Caerdydd	Mr. Howard	Episode: "Episode #1.1"
2006–2009	Bill Bellamy's Who's Got Jokes?	Himself/host	Main host
2007	Thank God You're Here	Himself	Episode: "Episode #1.7"
2007–2008	Last Comic Standing	Himself/Host	Main host: Seasons 5–6
2007–2008	October Road	Stratton Lorb	Recurring cast
2010	Castle	Mickey Reed	Episode: "The Late Shaft"
2010	Royal Pains	Aristotle	Episode: "The Hankover"
2010	Meet the Browns	Anthony	Recurring vast: Season 4
2012	Celebrity Ghost Stories	Himself	Episode: "Bill Bellamy/Dawn Wells/Jack Blades/Mary Lambert"
2012	BlackBoxTV Presents	Headshot	Episode: "AEZP: Execution Style"
2012-13	Mr. Box Office	Marcus Jackson	Main cast
2013	Centric Comedy All-Stars	Himself/host	Main host
2013	Who Gets the Last Laugh?	Himself	Episode: "Kunal Nayyar/Bill Bellamy/Jeff Dye"
2013	Big Morning Buzz Live	Himself/panelist	Episode: "Natalie Dormer/Capital Cities"
2013	Rachael Ray	Himself/guest co-host	Episodes: "Episode #8.6" & "#8.42"
2013	White Collar	Delmon Wells	Episode: "Empire City"
2014	Hot in Cleveland	Councilman Jim Powell	Recurring cast: Season 5
2015	Live at Gotham	Himself/Host	Episode: "Bill Bellamy"
2015	Murder in the First	PA Announcer	Episode: "Bruja Blanca"
2015–2017	Dinner at Tiffani's	Himself	Recurring guest
2016–2018	Unsung Hollywood	Himself	Episodes: "Bill Bellamy" & "Rickey Smiley"
2017	90's House	Himself	Episode: "The One with All the Pick-up Lines"
2017–2020	Funny You Should Ask	Himself	Recurring guest
2018	Insecure	Kev'yn	Recurring cast: Season 3
2020	This Is Stand-Up	Himself	Episodes: "Episode #1.1" & "#1.2"
2020	Unfiltered: Paris Jackson & Gabriel Glenn	Himself	Episode: "Who Is Paris Jackson?"
2020	S.W.A.T.	Jackie Shaw	Episode: "Knockout"
2020	Self Made	Sweetness	Recurring cast
2021	Dark Humor	Himself	Episode: "Comedy & Hip-Hop: We've Got Bars"
2021	Celebrity Family Feud	Himself/Celebrity Player	Episode: "Vivica A. Fox vs. Bill Bellamy and MLB Alums vs. MLB Wives"
2021	Dark Side of the 90s	Himself	Episode: "Hip Hop: The East vs. West Media War"
2021	The Wendy Williams Show	Himself/Guest Co-Host	Episodes: "Episode #14.22" & "#14.23"
2021	The Talk	Himself/Guest Co-Host	Recurring Guest Co-Host: Season 11
2022	Phat Tuesdays: The Era Of Hip Hop Comedy	Himself	Main guest
2022	Urban Eats and Treats	Himself	Episode: "Bill Bellamy"
2022	The Neighborhood	Lorenzo	Episode: "Welcome to the Man Code"
2023	Celebration of Black Cinema & Television	Himself/host	Main host
2023	Bel-Air	Julius Banks	Episode: "Let the Best Man Win"

=== Comedy Specials ===
Year	Title
1994	Bill Bellamy: Booty Call
2005	Bill Bellamy: Back to My Roots
2012	Bill Bellamy: Crazy Sexy Dirty
2013	Bill Bellamy's Ladies Night Out Comedy Tour
2022	Bill Bellamy: I Want My Life Back

=== Music Videos ===
Year	Artist	Title
1995	Da Brat	"Give It 2 You"
1995	2Pac	"Temptations"
1997	Foxy Brown	"Big Bad Mamma"

=== Video Games ===
Year	Title	Role
2005	Narc	Marcus Hill (voice)
2006	L.A. Rush	Lidell Ray (voice)
