= Tom Joyner Morning Show =

American syndicated radio program

The Tom Joyner Morning Show
- Genre: Talk, Urban Adult Contemporary, R&B/Soul
- Running time: 240 minutes (approximately)
- Country of origin: United States
- Home station: Was KZMJ (Dallas)
- Syndicates: Reach Media
- Starring: Tom Joyner; Sybil Wilkes
- Created by: Tom Joyner
- Original release: January 3, 1994 – December 13, 2019
- Opening theme: Oh, oh, oh, it's The Tom Joyner Morning Show
- Website: www.tjms.com

The Tom Joyner Morning Show was an American nationally syndicated radio program, hosted by veteran broadcaster Tom Joyner. The program, which aired on Urban contemporary- and Urban adult contemporary-formatted stations across the United States, ran from January 3, 1994 until December 13, 2019.

== Overview ==
The program aired live Monday through Friday for four hours, beginning at 6:00 AM Eastern time and was based in Dallas, Texas, where Joyner was previously the local morning host at KKDA-FM, until 2002, when he moved to KSOC (now KZMJ) (also a Dallas radio station). The Tom Joyner Morning Show aired on the station until November 14, 2014, when KSOC flipped to classic hip-hop, leaving the program without a flagship affiliate until September 11, 2017, the program returned to KSOC when it flipped back to urban adult contemporary. The program remained in Dallas until the mid-2010s, when Joyner began hosting remotely from South Florida after relocating to that area. The show's format featured Joyner and various contributors reporting and discussing the latest news and sports of the day alongside popular R&B songs from the 1970s through the present-day. The weekly best-of compilation was offered to affiliated stations on weekends under the title Tom Joyner's Right Back at 'Cha.

Southwest Airlines was a prominent sponsor of the radio show, especially Joyner's on-site remotes (called "Sky Shows"), and offered free round-trip airfare to any destination that Southwest flew as a recurring giveaway on the show. (Southwest is also headquartered in Dallas.)

Joyner attributed the national show's success to his complete refusal to serve non-black audiences. He stated in 2000: "We do a show for African Americans. That's what we do." In 2019 he stated: "Don't worry about crossover. Just super serve, super serve, super serve. Anything that affects African Americans, that's what you do."

== History ==
Joyner, who was perhaps best known for commuting daily by plane between Dallas and Chicago while simultaneously hosting local radio programs in both cities (conferring upon him the nickname "Fly Jock"), and as the first host of the syndicated television series Ebony/Jet Showcase, was signed by ABC Radio Networks in 1993 for a new national show to be distributed to Urban contemporary stations. The Tom Joyner Morning Show premiered on January 3, 1994. Joyner gained ownership of the program in 2003 when he co-founded his own company, Reach Media. The Black-owned media company Radio One (now Urban One) acquired majority ownership in Reach Media in November 2004, and took over syndication rights to the program in a joint venture.

In 2017, Joyner announced that he would retire and that the show would end in 2019, its 25th anniversary in syndication. In the summer of 2019, Joyner announced that Rickey Smiley, who was hosting a competing syndicated morning program on Urban contemporary and Rhythmic adult contemporary-formatted stations, would succeed him on Joyner's Urban AC affiliates. The final live episode of the Tom Joyner Morning Show aired on December 13, 2019. Joyner stated on his last program that his decision was made because of repeated salary cuts (claiming that successive cuts had reduced his salary nearly 90 percent); acknowledged that cultural changes and radicalization among black audiences ("I think we were more woke then than now") had reduced his influence and thus his listenership and affiliate count; and further stated that his own financial greed—about which he was unrepentant—drove much of his radio career.

Following Joyner's sign-off, Reach Media and Urban One offered "best of" compilation programs until December 31, 2019. On January 2, 2020, many of Joyner's former affiliates began airing the reformatted Rickey Smiley Morning Show.

== Featured personalities ==
- Tom Joyner
- J Anthony Brown (1996-2016)
- Sybil Wilkes
- Tyrell Zimmerman (On A Roll Catering, Newport News, VA)

== Others featured on the show ==
- Jacque Reid
- Roland Martin
- Kevin Frazier
- Jeff Johnson
- Jawn Murray (2006-2011)
- Sheryl Underwood (2006-2010).
- Tavis Smiley (1996-2008)
- George Wallace
- D.L. Hughley
- Al Sharpton
- Nikki Woods
- Myra J
- Damon Williams (comedian)
- Dominique (comedian)
- Huggy Lowdown (celebrity snitch)
- Chris Paul (The Morning Minute, The NFL Rap-Up, and The Cowboys Wake Up Show)
- Shaun King
