= D. L. Hughley Breaks the News =

American news show

- Country of origin: United States
- Original language: English

Production
- Production locations: CNN Time Warner Center Studios, New York
- Camera setup: Multi-camera
- Running time: 60 minutes
- Production company: 3 Arts Entertainment

Original release
- Network: CNN
- Release: October 25, 2008 – March 28, 2009

D. L. Hughley Breaks the News is an American news show that aired on CNN from October 25, 2008 to March 2009, hosted and head written by comedian D. L. Hughley. On March 9, 2009, CNN announced that Hughley would be ending the show due to a desire to work in Los Angeles and be closer to his family. He plans to continue his work with CNN as a Los Angeles–based contributor for the network.

On the show's finale, Hughley did a report about the legalization of marijuana. He took the show into a medical marijuana dispensary to get his doctor's prescription refilled for chronic back pain, but CNN censored that portion of the segment.

== Nazi Germany comparison ==
On his February 28, 2009 show, while discussing the Republican National Committee's attempts to gain popularity with the black community, Hughley expressed an opinion to RNC's Chairman Michael Steele and rapper Chuck D. Hughley observed, in reference to the majority whiteness of the attendants to the 2008 Republican National Convention, "The tenets of the Republican Party are amazing and they seem warm and welcome. But when I watch it be applied—like you didn't have to go much further than the Republican National Convention. ...It literally looked like Nazi Germany. It literally did. I make that point, not only are we not welcome—not only are we not welcome, but they don’t even care what we think. That seems to be the way I see..." Chairman Steele interrupted, "Well I'm here now, and you are right." Hughley's comparison was criticized by conservative commentator Andrew C. McCarthy, who called it a "slanderous claim". Steele also received criticism from conservatives for the same episode, both for expressing agreement with Hughley, and for a comment he made earlier on the show, dismissing radio host Rush Limbaugh as "an entertainer", and calling his radio show "incendiary" and "ugly". Conservative commentator Michelle Malkin wrote that Steele's comments "played right into the left's hands", while RNC member Ada Fisher, citing Steele's comments on the show, called on Steele to resign.
