= Dirty Laundry (2006 film) =

2006 drama film

- DVD cover
- Directed by: Maurice Jamal
- Written by: Maurice Jamal
- Starring: Rockmond Dunbar; Jenifer Lewis; Loretta Devine; Terri J. Vaughn; Maurice Jamal; Sommore
- Distributed by: Codeblack Entertainment; Freestyle Releasing
- Release dates: July 15, 2006 (Los Angeles Outfest Gay and Lesbian Film Festival); December 7, 2007 (United States)
- Running time: 100 minutes
- Country: United States
- Language: English
- Budget: $13 million

Dirty Laundry is a 2006 drama film written, directed, and starring Maurice Jamal. It was produced by 20th Century Fox Home Entertainment and distributed by Codeblack Entertainment. It is available on DVD and is rated PG-13.

== Plot ==
After ten years, Sheldon returns from New York City to Paris, Georgia. His mother is Evelyn, a laundress who is stubborn, ornery, opinionated, mean-spirited, insulting, and inflexible. Evelyn sends a ten-year-old boy claiming to be Sheldon's son to see Sheldon. Sheldon comes home to resolve the matter. Old arguments reignite between himself, his mother, his sister, and his brother.

Sheldon disputes that the boy is his son. He does not want to be a part of fatherhood or family. Then, a white man from New York arrives at Evelyn's door, claiming to be Sheldon's partner

== Cast ==
- Rockmond Dunbar as Sheldon
- Loretta Devine as Evelyn
- Jenifer Lewis as Aunt Lettuce
- Terri J. Vaughn as Jackie
- Maurice Jamal as Eugene
- Sommore as Abby
- Joey Costello as Ryan
- Aaron Grady Shaw as Gabriel
- Rainey Mathews as Pudge
- Bobby Jones as Pastor James
- Leigh Taylor-Young as Mrs. James
- Gregory Alan Williams as Percy
- Alec Mapa as Daniel
- Veronica Webb as Susan
- Erica Watson as Clarine
- Tony Vaughn as Auntie's Husband
- Chad Hawkins as Auntie's Rapping Son
- Dottie Peoples as Sister in Congregation
- Austin Whittaker as Young Sheldon
- Markelle Gay as Young Eugene
- Renee White Davis as Willa
- Tanya Shields as Bertie Mae
- Denita Isler as Norma Jean
- Clay Drinko as Bradley
- La Rivers as Tanya Elise
- Nathan Hale as Peanut
- Kate Secor as Liz
- Andrei Claude as Bartender
