= Sommore =

American comedian and actress

- Sommore in 2003
- Born: Lori Ann Rambough; May 15, 1966 (age 60); Trenton, New Jersey, US
- Education: McCorristin Catholic High School (1985); Morris Brown College
- Occupations: Comedian; actress
- Years active: 1992–present
- Relatives: Nia Long (half-sister)
- Website: www.sommore.com

Sommore (/səˈmɔːr/; born Lori Ann Rambough; May 15, 1966) is an American comedian and actress. Known as the "Diva of Contemporary Comedy", her comedic style features biting sarcasm and frank discussions about money, sex, and equality between the sexes. She first gained fame as the first female host of the long-running Black Entertainment Television (BET) stand-up showcase ComicView, as well as one of the four female comedians that headlined The Queens of Comedy tour.

She appeared in the films Friday After Next, Soul Plane and Dirty Laundry, and has received the Richard Pryor Award for Comic of the Year.

== Early life and education ==
Sommore was raised in Trenton, New Jersey. After attending Our Lady of the Divine Shepherd and The Pennington School, she graduated from McCorristin Catholic High School (now called Trenton Catholic Academy) in 1985. She graduated from Morris Brown College in Atlanta, Georgia, where she studied business administration. After receiving her degree, Sommore worked various jobs such as retail, employment consulting and an algebra instructor before progressing into her successful comedy career.

== Career ==
=== Television and film appearances ===
Sommore has appeared on various shows including HBO's Def Comedy Jam, Showtime at the Apollo, ComicView, and BET Live from L.A. She has also done guest appearances on television sitcoms The Hughleys and The Parkers, and she has been featured on The Oprah Winfrey Show. She also appeared on Comedy Central Roast of Flavor Flav. In 2008, she appeared as one of the mob members on several episodes of the game show 1 vs. 100.

Sommore in 2001

Her film appearances include Soul Plane, A Miami Tail, Friday After Next, and Something New.

Sommore and fellow African American female comedians Mo'Nique, Laura Hayes, and Adele Givens were the stars on The Queens of Comedy tour, which was filmed and subsequently aired on Showtime and released on DVD.

Sommore launched the worldwide premiere of "The Queen Stands Alone" on September 30, 2008. The release of her stand-up comedy special was a film version of her stand-up act and was written and produced by Sommore as well as her entertainment company One Thousand Kisses, Inc.

Sommore was a winning participant on the sixth season of Celebrity Fit Club. She lost 11 pounds during the show.

Her 2015 special Sommore: The Reign Continues was aired on Netflix in 2018. Her Netflix stand-up special, Sommore: Chandelier Fly, was released in February 2026.

== Personal life ==
Aside from her hometown of Trenton, New Jersey, Sommore has lived in Los Angeles and Fort Lauderdale, Florida. Currently, her primary residence is in Miami. Her father was the poet Doughtry "Doc" Long and her half-sister is actress Nia Long.

== Filmography ==
=== Film ===
Year	Title	Role	Notes
2002	Friday After Next	Cookie	
2003	A Miami Tail	Stephanie	
2004	Soul Plane	Cherry	
2006	Something New	Herself	
2006	Dirty Laundry	Abby	

=== Television ===
Year	Title	Role	Notes
1995	Snaps	Herself	Episode: "Episode #1.2"
1995	Def Comedy Jam	Herself	Episode: "Episode #5.5"
1995-96	ComicView	Herself/Host	Main Host
1996	It's Showtime at the Apollo	Herself	Episode: "Episode #9.20"
1998	The Hughleys	Keshia	Episode: "Pilot"
2002	The Parkers	Olivia Radcliffe	Episode: "Mother's Day Blues"
2005	Weekends at the DL	Herself	Episode: "Episode #1.18"
2006	The Tom Joyner Show	Herself	Episode: "Episode #1.15"
2006	Live at Gotham	Herself/Host	Episode: "Episode #1.6"
2006	Def Comedy Jam	Herself	Episode: "Episode #7.1"
2007	Wild 'N Out	Herself	Episode: "The Jump Off Special"
2007	Comedy Central Roast	Herself	Episode: "Comedy Central Roast of Flavor Flav"
2007-14	Comics Unleashed	Herself	Recurring Guest
2008	1 vs. 100	Herself	Contestant: Season 2
2008	Flavor of Love	Herself	Episode: "Things That Go Bump On The Lip"
2008	Celebrity Fit Club	Herself	Contestant: Season 6
2014	Just for Laughs: All-Access	Herself	Episode: "Jeff Ross"
2014	Hit the Floor	Herself	Episode: "Blow Out"
2014	Love & Hip Hop: Atlanta	Herself/Host	Episode: "Reunion Part 1-3"
2014	ComicView	Herself/Host	Main Host
2018	The History of Comedy	Herself	Recurring Guest: Season 2
2021	South Side	Yvonne Turner	Episode: "Life of an Ottoman"

=== Documentary ===
Year	Title
2005	The Funniest Man Dead or Alive
2009	Why We Laugh: Black Comedians on Black Comedy
2009	Blunts & Stunts: Class of '94

=== Comedy Releases ===
Year	Title
1995	Sommore: Bitch House
2001	The Queens of Comedy
2003	Latham Entertainment Presents
2007	Sommore: The Queen Stands Alone
2013	Sommore: Chandelier Status
2015	Sommore: The Reign Continues
2018	Sommore: A Queen with No Spades
2019	All The Queens Men
2023	Sommore: Queen Chandelier
2026	Sommore: Chandelier Fly
