= Steve Purcell (director) =

American film director and producer

- Born: March 26, 1957 (age 69); Los Angeles, California, U.S.
- Occupations: Film director, film producer
- Years active: 1980–present

Steve Purcell is an American film director and producer.

For much of his career he worked on a number of live concert films with artists such as Meat Loaf, Alanis Morissette, Trisha Yearwood, B.B. King and Yanni. In 2001, he directed the comedy concert film The Queens of Comedy. From 2001 to 2002, he directed Mary-Kate and Ashley Olsen in the films Holiday in the Sun, Getting There and When in Rome. He previously worked with the Olsens in a number of You're Invited to Mary-Kate & Ashley's... productions as a director and editor.
