= Warner Music Vision =

American music video company

- Type: Subsidiary
- Industry: Home Video
- Founded: 1990; 36 years ago
- Defunct: 2006; 20 years ago
- Fate: Merged with the Rights Company to form Warner Music Entertainment
- Successors: Warner Music Entertainment (2006–2013)
- Headquarters: United States
- Parent: Warner Music Group

Warner Music Vision (also known as Warner Vision and Warner Vision International) was a music video company formed in 1990 by Warner Music International to make music videos from artists and bands on Warner Bros. Records, Maverick Records, Sire Records, Atlantic Records, Elektra Records and other Warner Music Group labels and to release them on video.

In 2006, Warner Music Vision merged with the Rights Company to form Warner Music Entertainment.

== Labels ==
=== WarnerVision Entertainment ===
The label also had a sublabel, WarnerVision Entertainment (formerly A*Vision Entertainment from 1990 until 1995), to release special interest products. The A*Vision label was set up in 1990 by Atlantic Records, and their first release was the documentary Banned in the U.S.A., a 2 Live Crew documentary video. It expanded in 1991 when it partnered with Penthouse to distribute videocassettes under the Penthouse Video label. In 1992, A*Vision expanded again by signing a co-distribution with the niche-interest VIEW Video label.

1993 saw a wave of expansion into various niche fields; this diversification (done in part to counter a sluggish market for music video-related product) began in January 1993 with the launch of two autonomous labels: KidVision, primarily focusing on children's videos, and NightVision, for adult titles. A third new label, BodyVision, was launched in February to handle health and fitness titles; while sister company Warner Home Video had obtained the rights to Jane Fonda's popular exercise titles via their buyout of Lorimar-Telepictures several years prior, Kathy Smith workout videos became BodyVision's primary offering after Smith's previous distributor, Media Home Entertainment, closed its doors. Rhino Home Video, a division of Rhino Records, signed a distribution deal with A*Vision Entertainment in March; Warner Music via Atlantic had owned 50% of Rhino since 1992, but their home video division had been going through Uni Distribution Corp. under a pre-existing deal.

The expansion continued in 1994, as the company launched a label dedicated to motion pictures, known as Atlantic Group Films. The first film released under the label was the direct-to-video erotic thriller Indecent Behavior, which ranked No. 36 in the Billboard charts in its first week. A major coup for A*Vision was a deal with Saban Entertainment to release titles under the Saban Home Entertainment and Libra Home Entertainment labels; this deal brought A*Vision home video rights to the popular children's action series Mighty Morphin' Power Rangers. (PolyGram Video, the previous distributor of MMPR before A*Vision outbid them, retained rights to Saban's X-Men animated series.) The company also further cemented their exercise video dominance by acquiring The Maier Group, who had produced the hit exercise video series Buns of Steel.

The start of 1995 saw a shift in both name and position; the division would no longer report to Atlantic Records, but to Warner Bros. Records, which culminated in a rebrand to WarnerVision Entertainment on March 1, 1995; unit president Stuart Hersch was elevated to executive vice-president; the accompanying film unit was renamed from Atlantic Group Films to WarnerVision Films to reflect the change. The name change was marked by yet more expansion, this time by way of an alliance with Coliseum Video to release World Wrestling Federation product. That April, Dualstar Video, the video imprint of the Olsen twins' Dualstar Entertainment Group moved from BMG Kidz to WarnerVision through a new distribution pact.

However, the chaos that had afflicted Warner Music for much of the 1990s -- a period marked by internecine conflict and turmoil between executives and their respective supporters -- also began to affect WarnerVision. The first domino to fall was Mel Lewinter, Hersch's direct superior, who was fired by August amid both an investigation into stolen and resold Atlantic Records product and general executive turmoil at Warner Music. By October, rumors of Hersch's departure began to swirl, as then-head of Warner Music, Michael Fuchs, was purging executives who had supported Fuch's predecessor as chairman, Doug Morris. The relationship between Warner and Hersch began to sour, with Hirsch disallowed from seeking out new acquisitions or talking to licensors. (Another factor in Hersch's departure was the then-pending merger of Time Warner with Turner Broadcasting.) Late in the year, it was reported Time Warner planned to spin off WarnerVision to Hersch, who planned to revert the name of the unit to A*Vision Entertainment, which WEA would continue to distribute. The spinoff was then nullified in 1996 after Hersch's deal fell apart; instead, operational oversight of the unit shifted to Warner Home Video. WEA ultimately chose to abandon their remaining video distribution operations that August, with the loss of Live Entertainment (which opted to instead distribute their tapes independently) and Warner Home Video asserting their dominance over video product within the company. While the Dualstar Video deal continued on under Warner Home Video, the Saban Entertainment deal didn't, with the company switching distributors to 20th Century Fox Home Entertainment in October of that year.

=== Warner Reprise Video ===
Logo of Warner Reprise Video.

The company also had another notable sublabel, Warner Reprise Video (formerly Warner Music Video from 1984 until 1986), which focused on music video releases.

The company was initially set up in 1984 as Warner Music Video by WEA as a label to distribute the Warner Bros. Records catalog. The label debuted with a 20-minute compilation of Madonna's most recent hits. By 1986, Warner Music Video was renamed to Warner Reprise Video.

=== WEA Music Video ===
The company operated WEA Video (later known as WEA Visual Entertainment), also known as WEA Music Video in Canada and Australia, as their worldwide sales and distribution unit. From June 1992 to August 1998, WEA also distributed releases by LIVE Entertainment following the latter's stint with Uni Distribution Corporation, although WEA's role was decreased after LIVE took a more active role in July 1996, and continuing to pick, pack and ship for its distribution until 20th Century Fox Home Entertainment took over in late 1998.

== Jane Evans ==
A former operations director of Warner Music Vision, Jane Evans, had a park named after her in Hampstead, London, 2018.
