= The Original Kings of Comedy =

- Theatrical release poster
- Directed by: Spike Lee
- Written by: Steve Harvey; D. L. Hughley; Cedric the Entertainer; Bernie Mac
- Produced by: Spike Lee; Walter Latham; David Gale
- Starring: Steve Harvey; D. L. Hughley; Cedric the Entertainer; Bernie Mac
- Cinematography: Malik Sayeed
- Edited by: Barry Alexander Brown
- Production companies: MTV Productions; Latham Entertainment; 40 Acres and a Mule Filmworks
- Distributed by: Paramount Pictures
- Release date: August 18, 2000
- Running time: 116 minutes
- Country: United States
- Language: English
- Budget: $13 million
- Box office: $38.2 million

The Original Kings of Comedy is a 2000 American stand-up comedy film directed by Spike Lee and featuring the comedy routines of Steve Harvey, D.L. Hughley, Cedric the Entertainer, and Bernie Mac. Filmed in front of a live audience at the Charlotte Coliseum in Charlotte, North Carolina, the comedians give the audience their views about African-American culture, race relations, religion, and family. The film was produced by MTV Productions and Latham Entertainment, and was distributed by Paramount Pictures. It was shot over the last two nights (February 26 and 27, 2000) of the Kings of Comedy tour with Harvey, Hughley, Cedric, and Mac. The show is intercut with footage of the comedians backstage, promoting the show on the radio, at the hotel, and during a basketball game. It was a critical and commercial success. The film's popularity led to multiple spin-off films.

== Summary ==
=== Steve Harvey ===
Steve Harvey, the star of The Steve Harvey Show, is the master of ceremonies for the show. Unlike his sitcom character, Harvey's on-stage routines use a significant amount of profanity; as the show's M.C., Harvey is given three short sets instead of one long one.

The finale of Harvey's sets finds him poking fun at a member of the audience by stealing his coat while he is away from his seat, and remarking that the "thuggish"-looking young man couldn't possibly be in the field of "computer technology" that he claims he is. Harvey also covers his experiences growing up in the church, calling out the ineffectiveness of the typical black church "building fund", and recollecting his mother's friend Sister Odelle's profane language and befuddled attempts to sing a church hymn (interspersed with lyrics from television show theme songs).

=== D.L. Hughley ===
Harvey's first set is followed by D. L. Hughley, the star of The Hughleys. He talks about family, specifically Black-American family with roots in the South. He observes the differences between black people and white people; for example, Hughley notes that black people don't skydive or do other dangerous physical activities because they experience enough peril just trying to get through an average day. "Bungee jumping," he says. "That's too much like lynchin' for us!" He also talks about "helicopter man", a game he and his wife play in bed, and some skid-marked undergarments that he tried to hide at the bottom of his dirty clothes.

=== Cedric the Entertainer ===
Cedric the Entertainer (Harvey's co-star on The Steve Harvey Show) presents himself as the most in-tune with the younger demographic, and goes through a number of topics during his routine. Primary among these is his embellishment of the differences between the "hope factor" and the "wish factor": white people "hope" that nothing goes wrong, and black people "wish" someone would start trouble so that they can retaliate. Cedric acknowledges that he is now a "grown-ass man", and can no longer call his friends by their "lil' nicknames" or engage in other such immature behavior. Cedric refuses, despite mounting evidence, to admit that he stole jokes from Katt Williams.

He discusses how angry a black president might become if a Monica Lewinsky question were posed at a news conference, and also goes into routines about smoking, black athletes' expansion into golf, tennis, and other sports, what a "ghetto-ass wedding" would be like, and black people's eventual migration to the moon. Also his love for Jamaican music and how in their music they solve a simple problem.

In a November 2022 interview on Shannon Sharpe's podcast "Club Shay Shay", Cedric revealed that during the actual live tour and filming, he was the closing act and Bernie Mac actually went second after D.L. Hughley. But after filming, the producers and editors of the tour decided it would be best to edit the footage to put Cedric as the second act and Bernie as the closing act.

=== Bernie Mac ===
Bernie Mac is the most autobiographical of the group. He turns his comedy on himself. He uses short, punchy attacks to make his point about his decreased sex drive and desire for quick sex instead of longer periods of intercourse. Mac's longest routines involve his hard-nosed style of child-rearing, where he makes no qualms about "fucking a kid up" if he needs to. He goes into an extended routine about the stress of raising his sister's children for her while she recovers from drugs [Mac did not actually have a sister; this was part of the routine], and tells of a run-in he had with his two-year-old niece and his effeminate six-year-old nephew, whom he refers to repeatedly as "the faggot" (Mac's routine about his sister's kids later became the basis of his Fox Network family comedy The Bernie Mac Show).

He then tells a story about his mentally challenged nephew and his bouts with his bus driver; according to Mac, when the bus would come, his nephew would attempt to ask a question, but would immediately start stuttering, frustrating the bus driver and prompting him to drive off without picking him up. This continues the next few days, and Mac's aunt confronts the bus driver, asking why he was "denying [her son's] 'edumacation.'" The bus driver begins to stutter exactly like Mac's nephew, then proclaims "he was teasin' me!". The set, and the film, are concluded with Mac's piece on the ubiquity of the swear word "motherfucker", which he describes as "a noun: a person, place or thing," and then, as noted by New York Times reviewer Elvis Mitchell, "proceeds to give the heft of an adjective and even transforms it into a split infinitive." He can be seen on the archive footage (and the closing credits) on Harvey's eponymous talk show. The show also reunited with Harvey without Mac as well as paying tribute to him, which aired in November 2016.

== Reception ==
Rotten Tomatoes gives the film a rating of 83% based on reviews from 103 critics. The site's critical consensus reads: "If you want lots of laughs and don't mind some profanity, The Original Kings of Comedy can deliver." Metacritic, which uses a weighted average, assigned the film a score of 73 out of 100, based on 37 critics, indicating "generally favorable" reviews.

== Box office ==
The Original Kings of Comedy was produced on an estimated $3,000,000 budget. On its opening weekend, it grossed a total of $11,053,832 on only 847 screens, averaging to about $13,051 per venue and ranking as the second highest-grossing film that weekend behind only The Cell. It eventually grossed a total of $38,168,022 at the box offices.

== Home media ==
This film was released on VHS and DVD on February 27, 2001, and distributed by Paramount Home Entertainment. Bonus features on the DVD include the music video "#1 Stunna" by Big Tymers, Kings On The Town featurette, and bonus scenes.

== Soundtrack ==
A soundtrack containing performances from the film and hip hop was released on August 22, 2000, by Universal Records. It peaked at #50 on the Billboard 200 and #15 on the Top R&B/Hip-Hop Albums.

== Awards and nominations ==
2001 NAACP Image Awards

- Outstanding Motion Picture (nominated)

2001 Chicago Film Critics Association Award

- Best Documentary (nominated)

== Related films ==
The popularity of this movie inspired spin-offs, including The Queens of Comedy, The Original Latin Kings of Comedy, The Kims of Comedy, The Comedians of Comedy and The Killers of Comedy.
