= Miller Lite Comedy Search =

Contest for comedians

Miller Lite Comedy
- Genre: Comedy competition
- Country: United States
- Participants: Comedians
- Major events: Stand-up comedy
- Website: standupitsmillertime.complex.com

The Miller Lite Comedy Search Contest was a nationally known contest which identified up-and-coming comedians in the Chicago metropolitan area as well as nationwide.

Even though the contest was not limited to African-American contestants, the vast majority of those who competed were African-American. Miller Brewing Company usually collaborated with Chicago radio station WGCI-FM to host the event at various venues. Redd Foxx was the host of the event the first year, and later comedians such as Damon Wayans, Eddie Griffin, Mo'Nique and Steve Harvey acted as hosts.

Some past finalists and winners have included:

- Sheryl Underwood - 1989 Finalist
- Adele Givens - 1990 Finalist
- Bernie Mac - 1990 Grand Prize Winner
- Cedric the Entertainer

Mark Reedy was the first winner in 1987, and Craig Frazier won the contest in 1988.
