= Soul Plane =

2004 American film by Jessy Terrero

- Theatrical release poster
- Directed by: Jessy Terrero
- Written by: Chuck Wilson; Bo Zenga
- Produced by: David Scott Rubin; Jessy Terrero
- Starring: Tom Arnold; Kevin Hart; Method Man; Snoop Dogg
- Cinematography: Jonathan Sela
- Edited by: Michael R. Miller
- Music by: RZA
- Production companies: Metro-Goldwyn-Mayer; Turbo Productions
- Distributed by: MGM Distribution Co.
- Release date: May 28, 2004 (United States)
- Running time: 86 minutes
- Country: United States
- Language: English
- Budget: $16 million
- Box office: $14.8 million

Soul Plane is a 2004 American comedy film directed by Jessy Terrero (in his feature film directorial debut). The film stars a predominantly Black cast, with Kevin Hart, Tom Arnold, Method Man, and Snoop Dogg playing lead roles. Supporting actors include Mo'Nique, Loni Love, K. D. Aubert, D. L. Hughley, Godfrey and Sofia Vergara. The film revolves around multiple characters in different scenarios on board an airplane.

Soul Plane received negative reviews from critics and grossed $14 million worldwide making less than the $16 million it cost to make.

== Plot ==
Nashawn Wade claims that he has loved planes since he was a child, but he has a horrible experience with a typical airline: his dog Dre is classified as checked baggage instead of a carry-on, he eats a horrible airline meal, his buttocks get stuck in the toilet while he has diarrhea, caused by his meal, during turbulence, and Dre is fatally sucked through a jet engine after a flight attendant accidentally opens the cargo door.

In response to the terrible experience he endured, Nashawn sues the airline and is awarded $100,000,000 by the jury. He decides to use the money to start his own airline, called N.W.A. (Nashawn Wade Airlines), whose acronym and logo are a pop culture reference to rap group N.W.A. The airline specifically caters to African Americans and hip hop culture. The terminal at the airport is called the Malcolm X terminal, where two non-working TSA Agents, Jamiqua and Shaniece, are goofing off instead of checking belongings. The plane is a heavily modified Boeing 747SP, customized with low-rider hydraulics, spinners, and a dance club. The safety video is also a parody of the Destiny's Child song "Survivor".

After taking off from Los Angeles International Airport, Nashawn must deal with a multitude of problems, starting with his acrophobic captain, Captain Mack. At a cruising altitude of Flight Level 330, it is revealed that he has never left the ground because he learned to fly on computer simulators in prison. Meanwhile, his cousin Muggsey sets up a miniature casino and strip joint in one of the areas of the plane (as seen in the workprint and unrated versions of the film), and Nashawn's ex-girlfriend, Giselle is on board and less than happy to see him. Meanwhile, the Hunkee family, the only Caucasian passengers on board, must also deal with their own problems; Elvis' daughter Heather is turning 18 and plans to use her newfound freedom by drinking and having sex, his son has transformed from an exact duplicate of him to a stereotypical wigger, and his wife is suddenly addicted to black men after viewing pictures in a pornographic magazine.

Captain Mack seemingly dies after eating mushrooms that the co-pilot, First Officer Gaemon, uses to soothe his genital crabs. Nashawn attempts to contact Gaemon, who is incapacitated after slipping near a hot tub, forcing Nashawn to attempt to land the plane himself. Nashawn lands the plane safely, using flight attendant Blanca's flight knowledge which she learned while having sex in the cockpit with the pilot on another plane. The plane lands in the middle of Central Park instead of John F. Kennedy International Airport in Queens, New York, and the spinners are stolen from the plane. Nashawn reconciles with Giselle after earlier revealing to her that he only broke up with her so she would not give up her college opportunities for him.

The movie ends with Nashawn telling the audience the fate of his crew. He claims that he and his ex-girlfriend are back together and are taking their relationship slow this time around, his cousin Muggsey has started a strip club and gambling casino located in another airplane similar to the club in Nashawn's plane, Elvis has begun a sexual relationship with Jamiqua, and his son Billy has become a major music video director but has disappeared shortly after filming a Michael Jackson video. Captain Mack later wakes up to find his chain and clothing stolen.

== Cast ==
- Kevin Hart as Nashawn Wade
- Snoop Dogg as Captain Antoine Mack
- Tom Arnold as Elvis Hunkee
- Method Man as "Muggsy"
- K. D. Aubert as Giselle
- Godfrey as First Officer Leslie Gaemon
- Brian Hooks as D.J.
- Missi Pyle as Barbara Hunkee
- Arielle Kebbel as Heather Hunkee
- Ryan Pinkston as Billy Hunkee
- Loni Love as Shaniece
- Mo'Nique as Jamiqua
- Sofía Vergara as Blanca
- Sommore as Cherry
- D. L. Hughley as Johnny
- Gary Anthony Williams as "Flame"
- John Witherspoon as Blind Man
- Angell Conwell as Tamika
- Roberto Roman as Passenger
- Denyce Lawton as Flight Attendant #3
- Terry Crews as Bouncer
- Stephen Keys as Flight Engineer Riggs
- Richard T. Jones as False Denzel (uncredited)
- Lil Jon as Himself
- Ying Yang Twins as Themselves
- Karl Malone as Himself

== Release ==
=== Box office ===
Soul Plane opened on May 28, 2004, in 1,566 theaters. In its opening weekend, the film made $5,648,486 in the domestic box office, ranking number five behind Shrek 2, The Day After Tomorrow, Troy, and Raising Helen. At the end of its run, the film grossed $14,190,750 domestically and $631,596 overseas for a worldwide total of $14,822,346.

In an interview on the podcast WTF with Marc Maron, Hart said that the poor box office turnout was partly due to bootlegging, which had apparently begun three months before the film was released in theaters. He explained, "on the street, Soul Plane made 40 million dollars". Hart told Marc Maron that during a premiere, fans were coming up to him asking him to sign copies of the bootleg. Hart does, however, credit Soul Plane for making him popular enough to start touring around the country.

=== Critical reception ===
On the review aggregator website Rotten Tomatoes, 18% of 100 critics' reviews are positive, with an average rating of 3.8/10. The website's consensus reads: "A raunchy sendup of Airplane! that never really takes off." Metacritic, which uses a weighted average, assigned the film a score of 33 out of 100, based on 26 critics, indicating "generally unfavorable" reviews. Audiences polled by CinemaScore gave the film an average grade of "C+" on an A+ to F scale. Stephen Holden of The New York Times says in his review: "This hectic farce, which pushes every envelope, is so broad and relentlessly raunchy that it makes a spoof like Airplane seem as demure as a vintage drawing-room comedy." The A.V. Club's Nathan Rabin criticized the film for having stereotypical characters and humor made up of "desperate half-gags further botched by clumsy camera work and atrocious timing."

Scott Brown of Entertainment Weekly rated the film a "C−" grade, noting the similarities to Airplane saying, "The makers of Soul Plane figured they'd simply reverse the racial polarity and pack a whole movie full of similar material — just not as funny." He concluded that, "If you're looking for comic insights beyond the well-documented ass differential between whites and blacks, well, golly, you ought to try another carrier." Wesley Morris of The Boston Globe gave the film credit for delivering a couple funny gags but was offset by "embarrassing bathroom jokes and witless raunch". Despite giving credit to Hart, Hughley and Snoop for their performances, Marc Savlov of The Austin Chronicle felt that the rest of the film's sophomoric gags "only serves to make the rest of the production that much more humorless in contrast."

In late 2014, the film appeared on Empire magazine's users-voted list of "The 50 Worst Movies Ever", ranking number 47. Its given reason for being listed states: "This was billed as an 'urban' take on Airplane! That's a bad idea to begin with: like Scary Movie, parodies of a parody are on to a loser from the start. But with the addition of crude racial stereotyping (of all races) and a fatal lack of funny, this goes from bad to worst. If more voters had seen it, this would be in the top 10."
