= Getting Played =

- DVD Cover of Getting Played
- Written by: David Silberg
- Directed by: David Silberg
- Starring: Vivica A. Fox; Bill Bellamy; Carmen Electra; Stacey Dash
- Theme music composer: David Lawrence
- Country of origin: United States
- Original language: English

Production
- Executive producer: Eric Manlunas
- Producers: Vivica A. Fox; Lita Richardson; Michael Catalano; David Silberg
- Cinematography: Francis Kenny
- Editor: Charlene Perrone
- Running time: 84 minutes

Original release
- Release: December 10, 2005

Getting Played is a 2005 American romantic comedy television film directed by David Silberg, starring Vivica A. Fox, Bill Bellamy, Carmen Electra, and Stacey Dash.

== Plot ==
The film centers around three very attractive women who, after having many guy troubles themselves, decide to play a prank on a random man. Their goal is to seduce the man while catching the whole sequence on tape and ultimately humiliating him with the footage. Their plan runs into some snags, as the man they choose to prank knows what they are trying to do to him.

A man named Mark Sellers (Bill Bellamy) then has sex with Andrea Collins (Vivica A. Fox) and Lauren (Carmen Electra) while they video tape the intercourse, only for him to change both tapes. He then goes on a date with Emily (Stacey Dash) only to fall in love with her after finding that they both have a lot in common and they "look good together". In the end, they admit everything to each other, and after five minutes of begging, disturbing a couple eating dinner who they think that they are on a hidden camera show, decide to forgive each other and start out clean and honest.

== Cast ==
- Vivica A. Fox as Andrea Collins
- Bill Bellamy as Mark Sellers
- Carmen Electra as Lauren
- Stacey Dash as Emily
- Joe Torry as Josh
- Dorian Gregory as Darrel
- Kathy Najimy as Dr. Heidi Z. Klemmer
- Michael Jai White as Jerome
- Mindy Sterling as Lydia
- Joseph C. Phillips as Robert Mitchellson
- Janell Inez as Sharise
- Sheryl Underwood as Herself (Comedienne)
- Earthquake as James
- Tichina Arnold as Stephanie
- Larry B. Scott as Dennis

== Release ==
The movie was released on December 10, 2005, in the United States and the DVD was released on June 13, 2006.

== Critical reception ==
CHUD.com, "Getting Played is what happens when you try to stretch a sitcom plot into a feature length film. It’s much harder than it looks. The plot it paper thin and the ending is never in question, so you’ve got to find ways to pad the thing out to 90 minutes."
