= Bill Bellamy's Who's Got Jokes? =

- Starring: Bill Bellamy; Tommy Ford; Rodney Perry
- Country of origin: United States
- No. of seasons: 4

Production
- Running time: 60 minutes

Original release
- Network: TV One
- Release: August 22, 2006 – October 4, 2009

Bill Bellamy's Who's Got Jokes? (also known as Who's Got Jokes?) is a one-hour televised stand-up comedy competition hosted by Bill Bellamy which airs on cable television network TV One.

The original run was from August 22, 2006 until October 4, 2009. It features Thomas Mikal Ford as the "Pope of Comedy" and Rodney Perry as the "Man on the Street." Each episode, four contestants have to give a nice, clean three-minute comedy. If they curse or go over their time, the "Pope of Comedy" takes away a point.

Season One winner was George Willborn, a.k.a. "The Stress Reliever," who has gone on to co-host Baisden After Dark on TV One. Season Two winner was Shawn Morgan. Season Three winner was Lav Luv. Season Four winner was J. Reid.

== Notable contestants ==
- Rajiv Satyal
- Lil Rel Howery
- Tiffany Haddish
- Karlous Miller
- Eric Andre
- Tyler Craig
