= Sheryl Underwood =

American comedian and actress (born 1963)

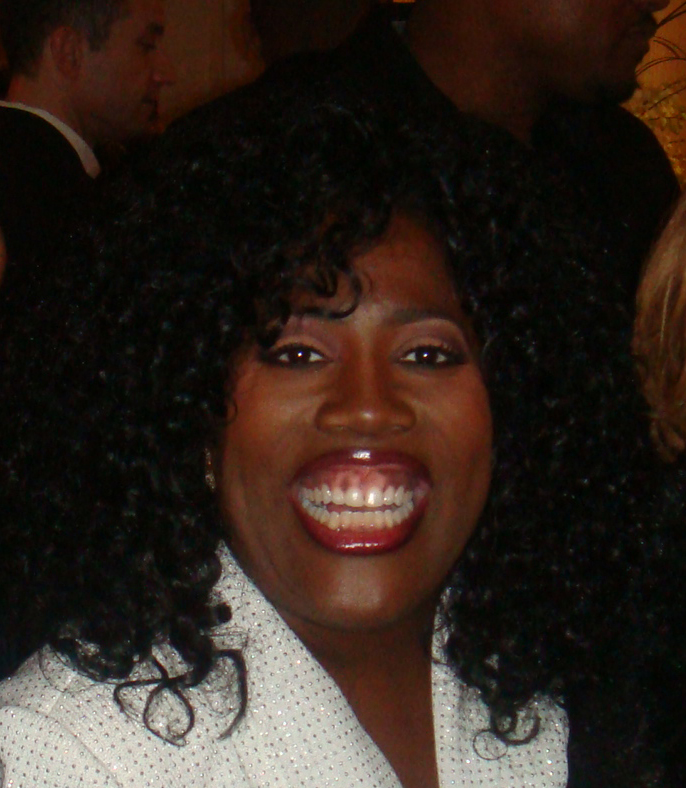
- Underwood in 2008
- Born: Sheryl Patrice Underwood; October 28, 1963 (age 63); Little Rock, Arkansas, U.S.
- Occupations: Comedian; actress; television host
- Notable work: The Talk; BET Comic View
- Education: University of Illinois Chicago (BA) Governors State University (MA)

Comedy career
- Years active: 1988–present
- Medium: Stand-up; television; film
- Subjects: Human sexuality; race relations; African-American culture; politics
- Website: packratproductionsinc.com
- Military career
- Branch: United States Air Force; Air Force Reserve
- Service years: 1981–1982
- Units: Travis Air Force Base; Maxwell Air Force Base; Sheppard Air Force Base; Castle Air Force Base; 928th Airlift Wing

Sheryl Patrice Underwood (born October 28, 1963) is an American comedian, actress, and television host. She first rose to prominence in the comedy world as the first female finalist in 1989's Miller Lite Comedy Search. Underwood was one of the hosts on the CBS Daytime talk show The Talk from September 2011 to December 2024, becoming the show's longest running co-host. She received a Daytime Emmy Award in 2017 and has been nominated seven times overall.

== Early life ==
Underwood was born in Little Rock, Arkansas, and later moved to Atwater, California, where she attended high school. Her sister, Frankie, was diagnosed with polio. Sheryl is now Frankie's caregiver.

== Professional career ==
After graduating college, Underwood joined the United States Air Force, where she served two years in the reserves. She later gained public notice as the first female finalist in the Miller Lite Comedy Search in 1989. She won the BET "Funniest Female Comedian on Comic View" award in 1994 and the BET Comedy Awards' Platinum Mic Viewers Choice Award in 2005.

Following her stand up success, Underwood took a number of minor acting roles, including Bad Mouth Bessie in the 1998 film I Got the Hook Up and Catfish Rita in the 2005 film Beauty Shop.

Underwood was the host of BET's Comic View and executive producer and host of the limited run comedy/variety series Holla (September 2002 – January 2003).

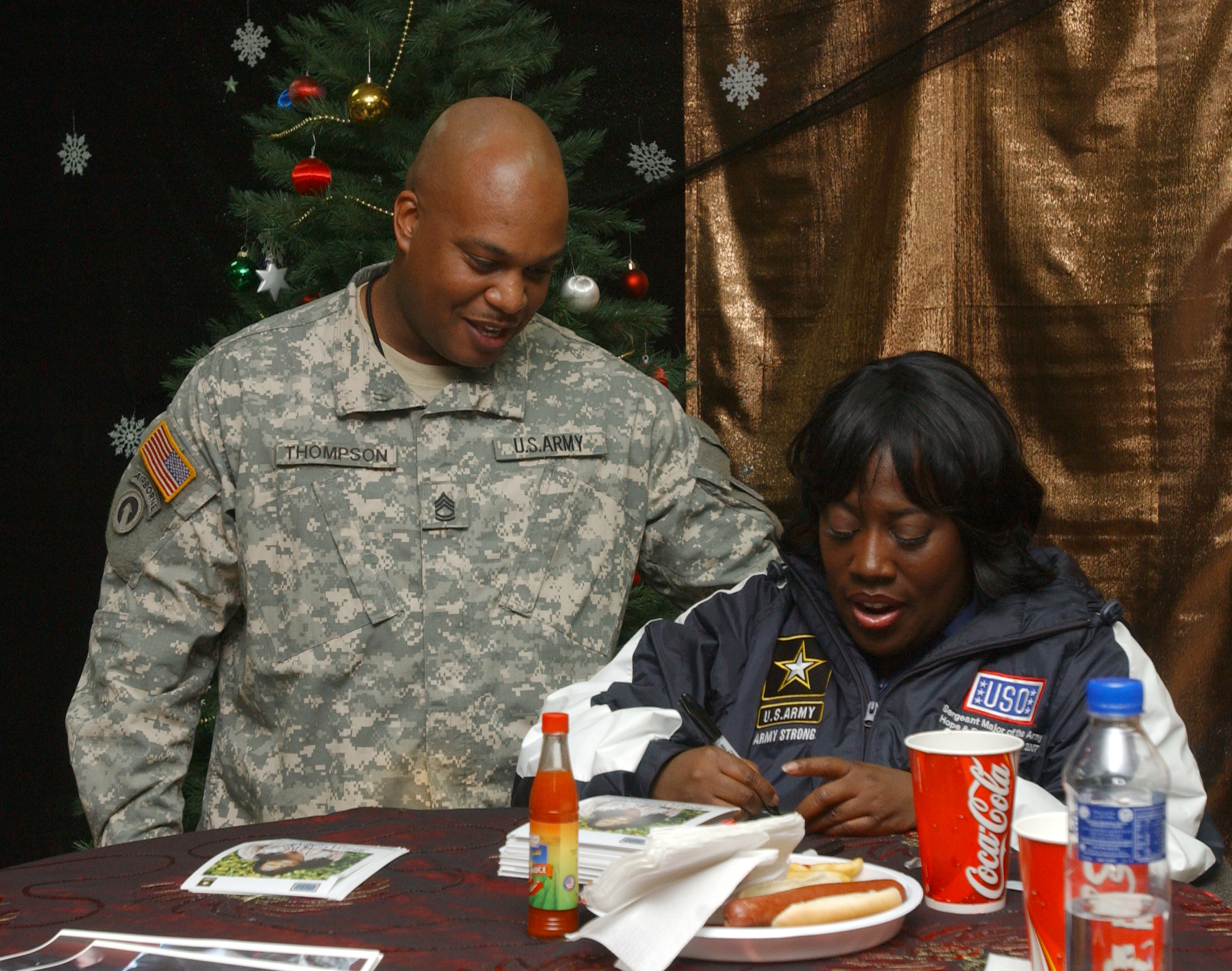
Sheryl Underwood with a soldier at Camp Arifjan, Kuwait, December 12, 2007, as a part of the Sgt. Maj. of the Army's Hope and Freedom tour to entertain deployed troops

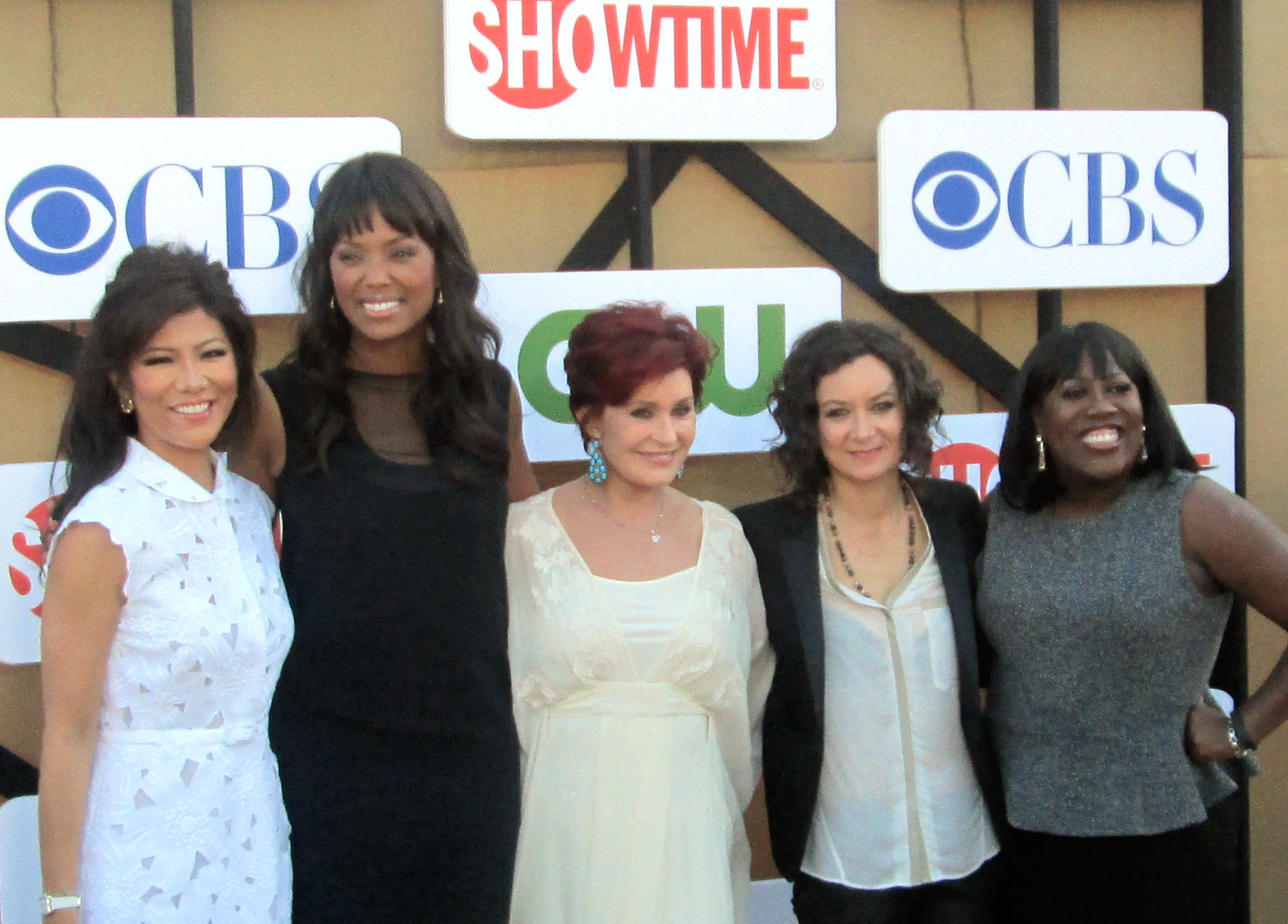
The Talk co-hosts Julie Chen, Aisha Tyler, Sharon Osbourne, Sara Gilbert and Sheryl Underwood in 2012

Underwood was a contributor on the nationally syndicated Tom Joyner Morning Show until June 2010 when she joined The Steve Harvey Morning Show as a contributor. She briefly hosted her own radio program, Sheryl Underwood and Company, for Radio One-owned Syndication One News/Talk and XM Satellite Radio's Channel 169 (The Power). On Tuesday nights, Underwood hosts The Sheryl Underwood Show on Jamie Foxx's Sirius Satellite Radio channel, The Foxxhole (Sirius 106)

In 2011, Underwood became a co-host of the CBS Daytime talk show The Talk in its second season, replacing Leah Remini. She remained on the show until it ended in December 2024.

Underwood signed a multi-year development deal with CBS Studios in 2022.

== Personal life ==
Underwood holds a Bachelor of Arts degree in liberal arts from the University of Illinois at Chicago and master's degrees in media management and mass communication from Governors State University. Underwood once served in the U.S. Armed Forces, and frequently makes jokes about "all the creative places you can get busy on a military base."

Underwood identifies as a lifelong Republican. However, she campaigned for Barack Obama's re-election in 2012 United States presidential election. Underwood also campaigned for Hillary Clinton in the 2016 election "because we have to protect the legacy of President Obama. Low voter turnout benefits Donald Trump and the Republicans. He can't win."

Underwood is a lifetime member of Zeta Phi Beta sorority, first joining in 1990. She served as president of the organization's Omicron Rho Zeta chapter, as the National Chair of Honorary Members, National Executive Board Chair and International Grand Basileus.

In addition to Zeta Phi Beta, Underwood is also a member of the National Council of Negro Women and the NAACP. She also founded the African-American Female Comedian Association.

In the fall of 2011, Underwood revealed that her husband—who suffered from clinical depression—died by suicide after they had been married three years.

=== Zeta Phi Beta presidency ===
Underwood was elected as the 23rd International Grand Basileus (President) during Zeta Phi Beta's biennial business meeting in Las Vegas, Nevada, in 2008. Her election as Grand Basileus was disputed, but District of Columbia Superior Court Judge Gerald I. Fisher dismissed a lawsuit against the sorority and Underwood that asked the court to unseat her.

== Filmography ==
Year	Work	Role
1992	Def Comedy Jam	Frequent Performer
1993	Soul Train Comedy Awards	Presenter
1997	Make Me Laugh	Herself
1998	Bulworth	Woman in Frankie's
1998	I Got the Hook-Up	Bad Mouth Bessie
2000	Oh Drama! (TV series)	Host
2001	Nikki (episode: "Working Girl")	Janet
2002	Holla	Host Executive Producer
2002	Tough Crowd with Colin Quinn	Herself
2004	BET Comedy Awards	Herself
2005	Beauty Shop	Catfish Rita
2005	The 2nd Annual BET Comedy Awards	Herself
2005	Weekends at the D.L.	Herself
2005	Made You Look: Top 25 Moments of BET History	Herself
2005	Getting Played	Herself
2007	Baisden After Dark	Herself
2011	Comics Unleashed	Herself
2011–2024	The Talk	Co-host
2012–13	The Young and the Restless	Justice of the Peace
2016	The Bold and the Beautiful (2016, 2018)	Emmy
2016	Supergirl (episode: "Falling")	Herself
2016	The Odd Couple	Diane
2017–19	Funny You Should Ask	Herself
2018	Jane the Virgin (episode: "Chapter Seventy-Four")	Herself
2019	I Got the Hook Up 2	Bad Mouth Bessie
2026	The Roast of Kevin Hart	Herself

Media offices
Preceded by Leah Remini	The Talk co-host 2011–2024	Incumbent
Preceded by Barbara C. Moore	Zeta Phi Beta National President; 2008–2012	Succeeded by Mary Breaux Wright
