= Def Comedy Jam =

Television series

- Genre: Stand-up comedy
- Created by: Russell Simmons; Bob Sumner
- Directed by: Stan Lathan
- Presented by: Martin Lawrence
- Country of origin: United States
- Original language: English
- No. of seasons: 8

Production
- Camera setup: Single camera
- Running time: 30 minutes
- Production companies: Brillstein-Grey Communications; Russell Simmons Television; HBO

Original release
- Network: HBO
- Release: March 6, 1992 – May 2, 1997

Related
- All Def Comedy

Def Comedy Jam is an HBO television series produced by Russell Simmons, Stan Lathan, and Bob Sumner. The series was hosted by Martin Lawrence and Joe Torry in its first six seasons, Steve Harvey in its seventh season, and D. L. Hughley in its eighth season.

Simmons and long-time collaborator Lathan were inspired to make Def Comedy Jam by The Uptown Comedy Club in Harlem, New York and The Comedy Act Theatre in Los Angeles, California. They teamed up with Def Jam Recordings label executive and veteran comedy scout Sumner to launch the show. The series had its original run from 1992 to 1997, and in 2006 it returned in the HBO fall lineup. The show helped to launch the careers of several African-American stand-up comedians.

On 10 September 2017, a Netflix special, Def Comedy Jam 25, was filmed at the Beverly Hilton. It was shown on 26 September 2017 and featured many of the comedy stars listed below.

== Notable performers ==
- Kid Capri
- Katt Williams
- Dave Chappelle
- Mike Epps
- Jamie Foxx
- Adele Givens
- Eddie Griffin
- D. L. Hughley
- Aries Spears
- Martin Lawrence
- Bernie Mac
- Monique Hicks
- Leslie Segar
- Sommore
- Chris Tucker
- Chris Rock
- Sheryl Underwood
- John Witherspoon

== Spin-offs ==
The show produced a spinoff called Loco Slam.

== Home media ==
The show was released on DVD boxsets in the US and the UK.
