= The Tom Joyner Show =

The Tom Joyner Show is a one-hour, live-action, comedy-variety show hosted by Tom Joyner. It features celebrities and musical artists. It is not to be confused with the Tom Joyner Morning Show. It aired from Fall 2005 to May 2006. In May 2006, Joyner announced that the series would cease production due to high production costs. Reruns were seen on TV One.

== See also ==
- Tom Joyner
- WCIU
