= Tamilee Webb =

American fitness professional and video maker

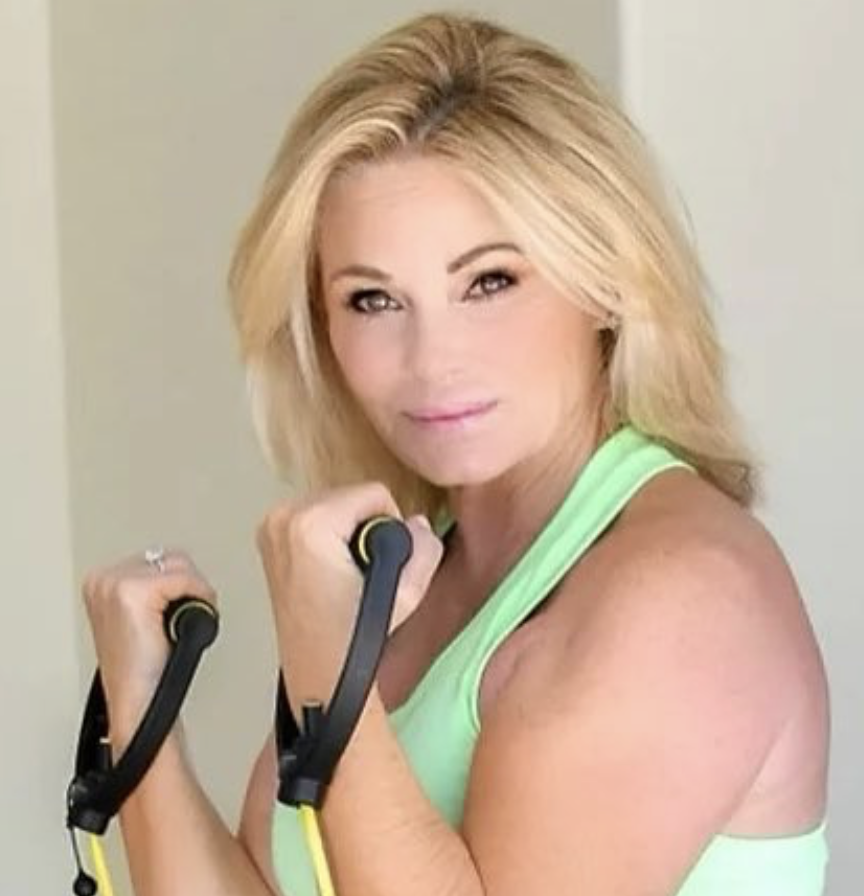
- Born: Rio Dell, California, U.S.
- Occupations: Fitness expert, author
- Known for: Starring in Buns of Steel series, hosting ESPN & Fox Fitness, and writing Workouts for Dummies

Tamilee Webb is an American fitness professional and creator of the Buns of Steel and Abs of Steel video series, which have sold more than 14 million copies. She also wrote Workouts for Dummies. Her videos have appeared on Billboard's video charts and her work is a The New York Times best seller.

== Early life and education ==
Webb grew up in Rio Dell, California. Webb has a bachelor's degree in Physical Education and a master's degree in Exercise Science from California State University, Chico's College of Communication and Education in 1996.

== Career ==
Webb's released Buns of Steel, a fitness video focused on sculpting and strengthening the buttocks. The concept originated with fitness trainer Greg Smithey, who was only able to sell 114 copies of his videos. At the time, Webb was a professional body builder working at the Golden Door spa and cruise ship as a fitness instructor when she was hired for the lead role. Over the next two decades, she released over two dozen fitness shows similar to the Buns of Steel, Abs of Steel, and Thighs of Steel series which sold more than 14 million copies. The videos were often able to be ordered direct, allowing one to work out at home. In her subsequent series, she designed functional workouts to work on core muscles.

In the late 1990s, Webb expanded her business ventures by starting a chain of fitness-focused eateries called Eden in 1996 and authoring Workouts for Dummies. In the mid-2010s, her work remained influential in the press as the fitness space continued its rise to prominence. As of 2024, she remains active in the fitness space.

== Personal life ==
Webb likes to cycle, play tennis, and golf.

== Filmography ==
Years	Title	Role
1988–2000	Buns of Steel	Lead role
1992–1994	Abs of Steel	Lead role
1993	Thighs of Steel	Lead role
1994	Building Tighter Assets	Lead role
1994	Fit TV Cable Health Club	Co-host
1990s	ESPN Fitness Pros	Co-host
1990s	Fox Sports Body Squad	Recurring cast

Webb has also appeared on NBC's The Today Show.

== Awards ==
Years	Nomination	Result
1992	Self Magazine Award	Won
2008	National Fitness Hall of Fame	Inducted

== Books ==
- Original Rubber Band Workout (1985)
- Step Up Fitness Workout (1994)
- Workouts for Dummies (1998)
- Defy Gravity Workout (2005)
