= Adele Givens =

American actress

- Occupations: Comedian; actress; writer
- Years active: 1989–present

Adele Givens is an American comedian, actress and writer. Beginning her career during the late–1980s in comedy, Givens television appearances include The Hughleys, Moesha, The Parkers, Comedy Central Presents, Def Comedy Jam, Russell Simmons Presents Def Poetry, Martin, Tracey Takes On... and The Steve Harvey Show.

== Career ==
Givens was the 1989 Grand Prize Winner of the Crown Royal Comedy Contest held at the Regal Theater in Chicago. The next year, Givens was a finalist in the Miller Lite Comedy Search, which was won by Bernie Mac. Her movie appearances include The Players Club and Beauty Shop. Givens and fellow African American female comedians Mo'Nique, Laura Hayes and Sommore were the stars of The Queens of Comedy tour, filmed and shown on Showtime and released on DVD. In 2001, she hosted The Source's Hip Hip Awards Preshow which was shown on UPN. On September 7, 2018, Givens was featured on Lil Pump's and Kanye West's hit single, "I Love It"; they performed the song on Saturday Night Live on September 29, 2018, however, Givens was not performing on the stage and was featured on the screen, wearing the same outfit as she wore in the music video.

== Filmography ==
=== Stand-up comedy releases ===
Solo albums and TV specials
Title	Release date	Debut medium
One Night Stand: Adele Givens	1996	Television (HBO)
Comedy Central Presents: Adele Givens	2002	Television (Comedy Central)
The Original Queen	2004	DVD Video

Collaborative albums and TV specials
Title	Release date	Debut medium
The Queens of Comedy	2002	Television (Showtime)

=== Film ===
Year	Title	Role	Notes
1998	The Players Club	Tricks	
2005	Beauty Shop	Helen "Hollerin' Helen"	
2014	Sex Ain't Love	Valerie	
2016	Boo! A Madea Halloween	Female Prisoner	
2019	I Left My Girlfriend for Regina Jones	Alice	
2024	Too Many Christmases	Darlene	
2026	Tube-E Movie	Angie	

=== Television ===
Year	Title	Role	Notes
1994	Pearl's Place of Play	Jocelyn	Television film
1996	Martin	Nurse Johnson	Episode: "Why Can't We Be Friends: Part 2"
1996	Moesha	Police Officer, Usher #1	3 episodes
1997	The Steve Harvey Show	Odetta	Episode: "Big Daddy Meets the Man of Steele"
1998–1999	Tracey Takes On...	Hellura	9 episodes
2001–2002	The Hughleys	Shari	13 episodes
2011	Are We There Yet?	Bailiff	Episode: "The Whose Card Is It Anyway Episode"
2022	South Side	Yvonne	Episode: "South Suburbs"
