= Livin' tha Life =

2003 film directed by Joe Brown

- Directed by: Joseph Brown
- Written by: Joseph Brown
- Screenplay by: Joseph Brown
- Story by: Joseph Brown
- Based on: Livin' tha Life by Joseph Brown
- Produced by: Joseph Brown
- Starring: Jarell Jackson; Edward D. Smith; Shawn Harris; Rodney Perry
- Cinematography: Joseph Brown
- Edited by: Michael Roquemore
- Music by: Harvey Estrada
- Production company: Central Avenue Filmworks
- Distributed by: Artisan Entertainment
- Release date: 22 March 2003 (United States)
- Running time: 84 minutes
- Country: United States
- Language: English
- Budget: $ 400

Livin' tha Life is a 2003 film produced in Compton, CA by Central Avenue Filmworks. The Film was directed by Joe Brown and distributed by Artisan Entertainment.

== Synopsis ==
The basis of the film is a day in the life of two friends, Jamal and Peanut in through their daily routine in Compton. When the two accidentally apprehend a thief found breaking into Jamal's house, the thief then drops dead in front of them. The two place him in the trunk and try and continue on with their day.

== Cast ==
- Shawn Harris - Killer D
- Archie Howard - Big Man
- Hurricane - Barber
- Jarell Jackson - Jamal
- Pepper Jackson - The Kid
- Rodney Perry - Uncle Fred
- Kaluha Richardson - Girlfriend
- Edward D. Smith - Peanut
- Stixx - Burglar
- Zai Wilburn - Lil Mad Dog

== Other Info ==
- The Game used an audio excerpt from this film in his song "The Documentary", featured on The Documentary.
- The film had a US$400 shooting budget.
- This film received negative comparisons to "Friday (1995 film)".
- The clip where the Kid demands a Japanese lady at a liquor store for a refund has since become a viral YouTube video.

== See also ==
- List of hood films
