= The Mo'Nique Show =

- Created by: Mo'Nique; Sidney Hicks
- Presented by: Mo'Nique
- Opening theme: "(Do It) 'Til You're Satisfied" (Season 1) "Keep On Doin' It" (Season 2)
- No. of seasons: 2
- No. of episodes: 251

Production
- Executive producers: Mo'Nique; Sidney Hicks; Marilyn Gill
- Production location: Atlanta, Georgia
- Running time: 60 minutes (including commercials)

Original release
- Network: BET
- Release: October 5, 2009 – August 16, 2011

The Mo'Nique Show is an American talk show hosted by comedian and actress Mo'Nique. Airing on BET, the series began October 5, 2009. The show's second and final season premiered on Monday, October 4, 2010.

== Overview ==
The show ran all-new episodes Monday through Thursday at 11PM ET, featuring celebrity guests and musical performances. The hour-long program also featured a "resident deejay." Although aired on BET, it was recorded at Turner Broadcasting in Atlanta, Georgia. After being cancelled, The Mo'Nique Show is now on repeat from its final season and airs at 3 a.m.

== Premiere episode ==
On the debut episode, celebrity guests included:

- Steve Harvey, promoted his book Act Like a Lady, Think Like a Man: What Men Really Think About Love, Relationships, Intimacy, and Commitment.
- Monica, promoted her BET show, Monica: Still Standing.
- Live performance by Jeremih, performing Imma Star (Everywhere We Are).

== Format ==
The show begins with the theme song accompanied by an announcer announcing the featured guests. Mo'Nique appears from an 'elevator', and is walked down the stairs by Rodney Perry. Mo'Nique proceeds to center stage and begins her monologue. At the conclusion of each show, Mo'Nique gives her final thoughts; these final thoughts usually pertain to the monologue from the beginning of the show and/or the guests that appeared on the episode. Following her final thoughts, she instructs her studio audience as well as home viewers to "take their arms and wrap them around themselves and squeeze real tight, because we've all just been hugged."

== Ratings ==
The debut episode attracted over 1.5 million viewers, 850,000 of which were said to have come from the 18–49 demographic.

== Awards and nominations ==
NAACP Image Awards

- 2010 Award for Outstanding Talk Series
- 2011 Nomination for Outstanding Talk Series
