= Karen Salmansohn =

Karen Salmansohn is a bestselling author of self-help books. She is known for books with provocative titles such as How to Be Happy, Dammit and How to Succeed in Business without a Penis.

== Career ==
Salmansohn started her career working at an advertising agency in Manhattan and quit her job to become a writer. Her first book was the novel 50% Off published by St. Martin's Press, which billed her as the "Jerry Seinfeld of Literature".

Her early self-help books included How to Make Your Man Behave in 21 Days or Less, Using the Secrets of Professional Dog Trainers. She also wrote Even God Is Single, So Stop Giving Me a Hard Time.

In 2001, she made her children's book debut with Tricycle.
