= D. L. Hughley =

American actor and comedian (born 1963)

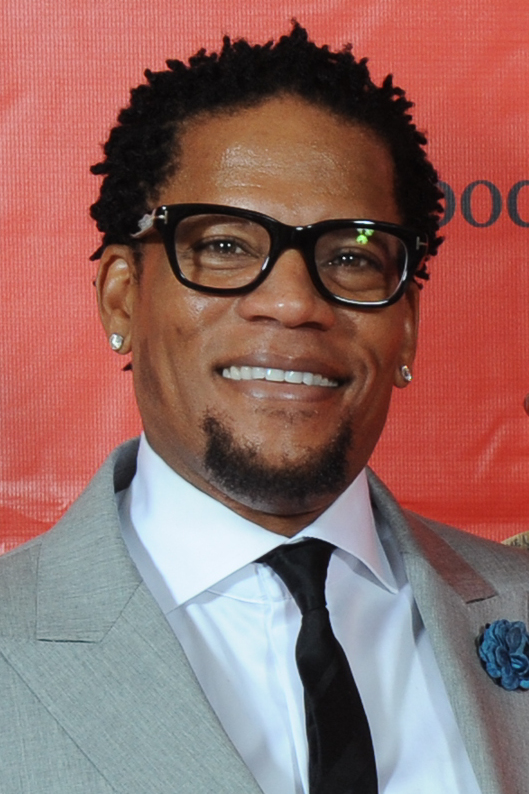
- Hughley at the 72nd Annual Peabody Awards in May 20, 2013
- Born: Darryl Lynn Hughley; March 6, 1963 (age 63); Portsmouth, Virginia, U.S.
- Occupations: Actor; comedian; producer; screenwriter; radio personality
- Years active: 1990–present
- Spouse: LaDonna Hughley (m. 1986)
- Children: 4

Darryl Lynn Hughley (/ˈhjuːɡliː/; born March 6, 1963 or 1964) is an American actor and stand-up comedian. Hughley is best known as the original host of BET's ComicView from 1992 to 1993, the eponymous character on the ABC/UPN sitcom The Hughleys, and as one of the "Big Four" comedians in The Original Kings of Comedy. Additionally, he has been the host of CNN's D. L. Hughley Breaks the News, a correspondent for The Jay Leno Show on NBC, and a local radio personality and interviewer in New York City. In early 2013, D. L. Hughley landed in ninth place on Dancing with the Stars.

== Early life ==
Hughley was born in Portsmouth, Virginia, the son of Audrey and Charles Hughley, who was a Delta Air Lines maintenance worker. He is the second of four children. He stayed in Portsmouth for only two months before his family moved, Hughley grew up in South Central Los Angeles. Hughley's teen years were troubled as he became a member of the notorious street gang, the Bloods, and was expelled from San Pedro High School. However, he eventually turned his back on gang life, got his GED, and obtained employment with the Los Angeles Times.

== Career ==
From 1992 to 1993, Hughley was the original host of ComicView, the stand-up comedy program on BET. In 1993, he also appeared in the third season of The Fresh Prince of Bel-Air as Will's friend Keith Campbell, a comedian from Philadelphia.

From 1998 to 2002, Hughley wrote, produced and starred in the ABC/UPN sitcom series, The Hughleys, based on his real-life experiences living with his African-American family in an upscale neighborhood. He continued stand-up comedy, joining Steve Harvey, Cedric the Entertainer and Bernie Mac as one of the "Big Four" comedians performing on the popular Kings of Comedy tour, which led to the film The Original Kings of Comedy (2000).

In 2005, Hughley released a stand-up comedy album "D.L. Hughley: Notes From The GED Section", and had a short-lived talk show on Comedy Central called Weekends at the D.L.. He also had roles on Studio 60 on the Sunset Strip, and on NBC's Scrubs as Turk's brother. In 2008, he was the host of the BET Awards. He also attended the funeral of one of his best friends and fellow King of Comedy, Bernie Mac where he gave a tearful speech during the eulogy.

From 2009 to 2010, Hughley was a correspondent for NBC's The Jay Leno Show. In June 2010, Hughley served as special guest moderator of ABC's The View for one day. Hughley also guest-starred on TBS's Glory Daze in 2010, and guest hosted Who Wants to Be a Millionaire in 2011.

Hughley's first book, I Want You to Shut the F#ck Up: How the Audacity of Dopes Is Ruining America, with contributions from Michael Malice, was published on July 31, 2012, by Crown Archetype Press. Hughley's second book, Black Man, White House: An Oral History of the Obama Years, was published on June 6, 2017, by William Morrow. His third book, How Not to Get Shot: And Other Advice From White People with contributions from Doug Moe was published on June 26, 2018, by William Morrow. Hughley's fourth book, Surrender, White People: Our Unconditional Terms for Peace with contributions from Doug Moe was published on June 30, 2020, by HarperCollins. His fifth book, How to Survive America, was published June 15, 2021, with contributions from Doug Moe was published on June 15, 2021, by Custom House.

In 2013, Hughley was a contestant on season 16 of Dancing with the Stars. He was partnered with two-time champion Cheryl Burke, finishing in ninth place after being eliminated in the fifth week of competition.

His films roles include Inspector Gadget (1999), The Brothers (2001), Inspector Gadget 2 (2003), Scary Movie 3 (2003), Soul Plane (2004), and Cloud 9 (2006).

He is now hosting a talk show, The D.L. Hughley Show, that premiered on TV One on March 18, 2019.

=== CNN ===
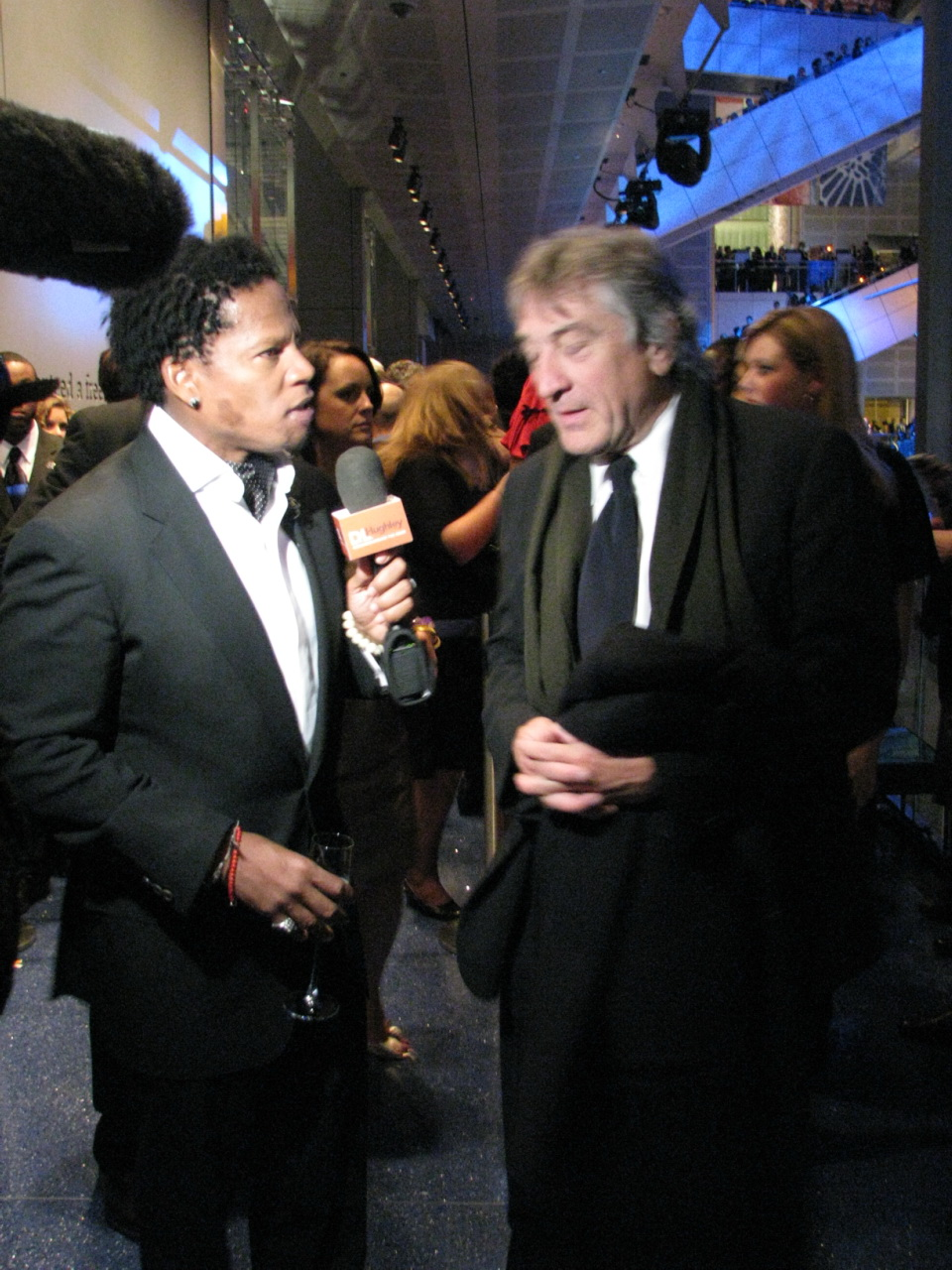
Hughley with Robert De Niro in 2009

Hughley was selected to host and write a comedic news-show on CNN which covers global happenings in politics, entertainment, sports and pop culture, titled D. L. Hughley Breaks the News, which aired its premiere episode on Saturday, October 25, 2008, at 10 p.m. EDT on CNN. On March 9, 2009, CNN announced Hughley would be ending the show due to a desire to work in Los Angeles and be closer to his family. He planned to continue his work with CNN as a Los Angeles-based contributor for the network.

=== Radio ===
Hughley also has a career as an on-air radio personality. On July 20, 2009, The D.L. Hughley Morning Show premiered on WRKS (now WEPN), more popularly known at the time as 98.7 Kiss FM, an urban adult contemporary station in New York City. His co-hosts included former BET news correspondent Jacque Reid. Airing from 6 to 10 am, the show placed Hughley in direct competition with his fellow "King of Comedy" Steve Harvey, whose nationally syndicated Steve Harvey Morning Show airs in New York on WBLS (Kiss FM's longtime rival). There were plans to take Hughley's show into syndication as well, but a dispute regarding his salary erupted between Kiss FM's parent company and the potential syndication company. In August 2010, Kiss FM dropped the show from its schedule, and Hughley moved on to other endeavors.

On August 12, 2013, REACH Media, the syndicator founded by Tom Joyner, announced it had finalized a deal with D.L. to host a new nationally syndicated afternoon drive show, The D.L. Hughley Show, distributed by Cumulus Media Networks.

== Personal life ==
Hughley and his wife, LaDonna, have two daughters, Ryan and Tyler, and a son, Kyle. Hughley has discussed his son's autism on several occasions.

On November 9, 2017, Hughley gave an interview on Angela Yee's Lipservice podcast in which he described having an affair early in his marriage and career. His mistress had become pregnant and had a son; the infant was shaken to death by the infant's mother's boyfriend.

On June 19, 2020, Hughley collapsed while performing at a club in Nashville, Tennessee; the reported cause was exhaustion. Subsequent tests revealed he was positive for COVID-19.

Hughley was initiated as an honorary member of Omega Psi Phi fraternity on July 30, 2020.

== Filmography ==
=== Film ===
Year	Title	Role	Notes
1999	Inspector Gadget	Gadgetmobile	Voice
2000	The Original Kings of Comedy	Himself	
2001	The Brothers	Derrick West	
2003	Inspector Gadget 2	Gadgetmobile	Voice/Video
2003	Chasing Papi	Rodrigo	
2003	Scary Movie 3	John Wilson	
2004	Soul Plane	Johnny	
2005	Shackles	Ben Cross	
2006	Cloud 9	Tenspot	
2006	The Adventures of Brer Rabbit	Brer Fox	Voice/Video
2007	D.L. Hughley: Unapologetic	Host	Comedy Special
2008	D. L. Hughley Breaks the News	Host	
2008	Spy School	Albert	
2014	D.L. Hughley: Reset	Host	Comedy Special
2018	D.L. Hughley: Contrarian	Host	Comedy Special

=== Television ===
Year	Title	Role	Notes
1992	One Night Stand	Himself	Comedy Special
1993	The Fresh Prince of Bel-Air	Keith	Guest star
1994	HBO Comedy Half-Hour	Himself	Comedy Special
1995	Double Rush	Marlon	Main cast (13 episodes)
1997	Sister, Sister	Hank	Episode: "Slime Party"
1998–2002	The Hughleys	Darryl Hughley	Lead role
2000	America's Funniest Home Videos	Himself	Host in several specials
2001	The Parkers	Darryl Hughley	Crossover appearance
2003	Scrubs	Kevin Turk	Guest star
2003	Premium Blend	Himself	Host
2004	The Late Late Show	Himself	Guest Host
2005	Weekends at the D. L.	Himself	Host
2006–2007	Studio 60 on the Sunset Strip	Simon Stiles	Lead role
2010	Hawaii Five-0	Skeet	Guest star
2011	Who Wants to Be a Millionaire	Guest host	
2012	DL Hughley: The Endangered List	DL Hughley	Executive producer, star, won a Peabody Award
2013	Dancing with the Stars	Himself	Contestant
2013	Trust Me, I'm a Game Show Host	Himself	Co-host
2016	Heartbeat	Dr. Hackett	
2016	Match Game	Himself	Panelist
2017	The Comedy Get Down	Himself	
2018	The Fix	Himself	Team Captain
2019	The D.L. Hughley Show	Himself	Host
2021–2022	Johnson	Eugene Johnson	
2023	The Daily Show	Guest Host	4 episodes (Week of Jan. 30)
2023	The Neighborhood	Himself	

== Books ==
- I Want You to Shut the F#ck Up: How the Audacity of Dopes Is Ruining America (with Michael Malice), Crown Archetype, 2012. ISBN 978-0307986238
- Black Man, White House: An Oral History of the Obama Years (with Michael Malice), William Morrow, 2016. ISBN 978-0062399793
- How Not to Get Shot: And Other Advice From White People (with Doug Moe), William Morrow, 2018. ISBN 978-0062698544
- Surrender, White People: Our Unconditional Terms for Peace (with Doug Moe), William Morrow, 2020. ISBN 978-0062953704
- How to Survive America (with Doug Moe), Custom House, 2021. ISBN 978-0063072756
- Charlie's Boy: A Memoir, HarperCollins, 2026. ISBN 978-0063435407
