= Tom Joyner =

American radio host (born 1949)

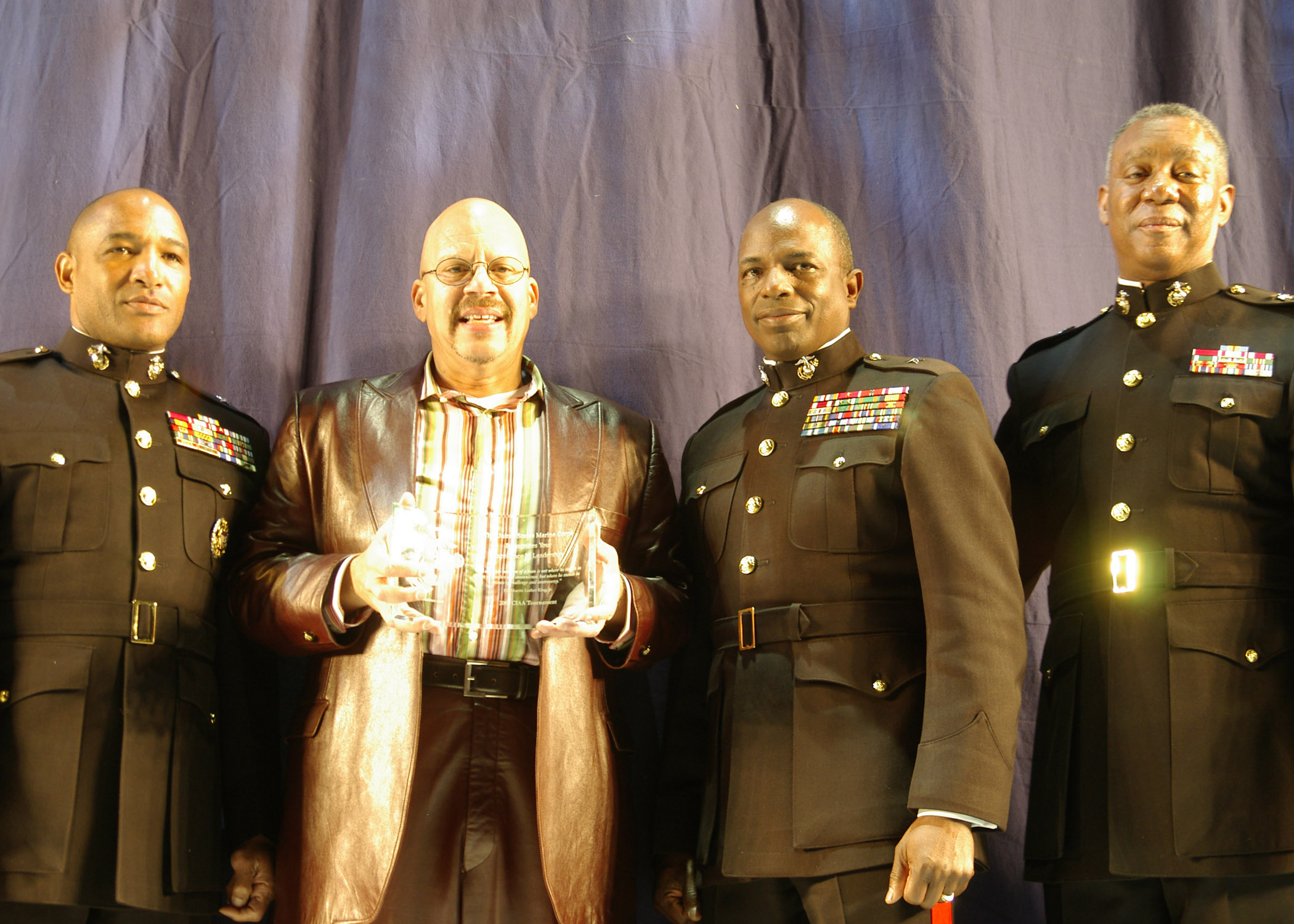
- Joyner (second from the left) in 2005
- Born: Thomas Joyner; November 23, 1949 (age 76); Tuskegee, Alabama, U.S.
- Occupations: Radio personality; host; musician; philanthropist
- Years active: 1975–present
- Spouse(s): Dora Chatmon (m. 1970s–div. 1996) Donna Richardson (m. 2000; div. 2012)
- Children: 2
- Presenting career
- Show: The Tom Joyner Morning Show
- Style: Talk; Urban adult contemporary; R&B; Soul
- Country: United States

Thomas Joyner (born November 23, 1949) is an American radio personality, host, philanthropist and former musician. Joyner is the former host of the nationally syndicated The Tom Joyner Morning Show, and also founder of Reach Media Inc., the Tom Joyner Foundation, and BlackAmericaWeb.com.

== Early life ==
Joyner was born in Tuskegee, Alabama, the son of Frances and Hercules L. Joyner. Tom came from an educated family: his grandfather Oscar was one of only 3,000 black physicians in the United States, earning a degree in medicine in 1909. Both of his parents were graduates of historically black colleges, and both Tom and his brother Albert attended Tuskegee Institute, now known as Tuskegee University. Tom Joyner graduated with a degree in sociology. While a student at Tuskegee, Joyner joined the fraternity Omega Psi Phi. At first, his goal was to be a musician, and he joined a band, the Commodores, that included his college friend Lionel Richie, but the band did not make any money and his family encouraged him to seek another way to make a living.

== Radio career ==
Joyner had been involved in college radio and began his broadcasting career in Montgomery, Alabama immediately upon graduation, and worked at a number of radio stations in the South and Midwest, including stations in Dallas, Memphis and St. Louis, before moving to Chicago in early 1978. In Chicago, he first worked at WVON, doing the morning show, but left the station after only three months to work at a competitor, WBMX-FM. By late July 1978, however, he had been hired away by Charles Mootry, general manager of station WJPC (AM) (now WSFS). This station, named for "Johnson Publishing Company", was owned by John H. Johnson, publisher of Jet and Ebony. Joyner hosted the morning show at WJPC and, while there, gained his first national television exposure as the first host of the syndicated magazine series Ebony/Jet Celebrity Showcase.

In 1983, Joyner returned to Dallas to become morning host at KKDA-FM. Two years later, he was offered an afternoon show at WGCI-FM in Chicago. Instead of choosing between the two, Joyner chose to take the Chicago position while simultaneously remaining at the Dallas station. For eight years (1985–1993) he commuted daily by plane between the two cities, earning him the nicknames "The Fly Jock" and "The Hardest Working Man in Radio". He later told Radio Ink magazine that he racked up seven million frequent flyer miles over the course of his employment at both stations; a travel agent had found him a $30,000 fare that would guarantee him a round-trip seat for five years. Joyner was able to work for both stations concurrently since neither of his two employment contracts had an exclusivity clause.

In 1994, Joyner was signed by ABC Radio Networks to host a nationally syndicated program, The Tom Joyner Morning Show, featuring Joyner and a team of comedians and commentators reporting and discussing the latest news and sports of the day, and playing popular R&B songs from the 1970s through the 1990s as well as contemporary R&B hits. Also featured were celebrity guests, on-site remotes (called "Sky Shows"), and an on-air soap opera, It's Your World which is currently not aired. Southwest Airlines is a prominent sponsor of the radio show, especially Joyner's "Sky Shows", and free round-trip airfare to any destination that Southwest flies to was a recurring giveaway on his show.

Upon signing a contract extension with Westwood on October 17, 2017, Joyner announced that he would retire at the agreement's end (2019), declaring "I'm retiring, and for the next two years we're going to reminisce, go down Memory Lane and talk about all the things that we've done for the past 25 years." He retired from his morning show on December 13, 2019.

== The Tom Joyner Show ==
In 2005, a nationally syndicated television show, The Tom Joyner Show, was launched with Joyner as emcee of a one-hour comedy/variety show, combining sketch comedy featuring the Tom Joyner Show Players (his co-hosts from the radio show), talent contests, and musical performances by such artists as Patti LaBelle; Earth, Wind and Fire; Brian McKnight; Kenneth "Babyface" Edmonds; and Toni Braxton. The show attracted advertisers such as McDonald's, Chrysler Corporation, Walmart and Southwest Airlines.

While the program achieved top ratings for a weekly syndicated program themed to African American viewers — even taking the number one show position, although it was in a late night time slot — in such markets as New York and Atlanta, affiliates in other markets were reluctant to upgrade the show to prime time for a targeted audience. Without the opportunity to reach a larger audience in earlier time slots and achieve greater revenues, the show had limited ability to offset the residuals and music clearances required by the many performers appearing on the show. Despite award recognition, in May 2006, Joyner decided not to continue due to production costs related to the music variety show concept. Re-runs are shown on TV One cable channel. As for his radio career, Tom Joyner continues to be an influential broadcaster: the TJMS is heard live in over 100 cities, both on-air and via streaming audio, through its syndicator, Reach Media.

== The Tom Joyner Foundation ==
Capitalizing on the popularity of the Tom Joyner Morning Show, Joyner founded The Tom Joyner Foundation. The mission of the foundation is to support historically black colleges and universities (HBCUs) through student scholarship, endowment, and capacity building enhancements. In the foundation's first month, $20,000 was raised in 'Dollars for Scholars' scholarship money. Since 1998, it has raised more than $65 million to help keep students enrolled at HBCUs.

The charitable foundation prides itself in having the capability of providing donors specifics of what institution and what student is on the receiving end. The Tom Joyner Foundation also hosts an annual cruise named the Fantastic Voyage which also raises money for HBCUs.

=== Scholarships ===
The Hercules Scholarships

The Hercules Scholarship, named after Tom Joyner's late father, targets male HBCU students enrolled in the School of the Month program. The $1500 scholarship is awarded every Thursday to scholars selected by the School of the Month. Past schools include Dillard University, Stillman College, North Carolina A&T, and more.

Full Ride Scholarship

The Full Ride Scholarship is awarded to one freshman entering a HBCU each year, in recognition of academic distinction and personal qualities.

=== Programs ===
Veterans Education Program

Central State University in Wilberforce, Ohio, partnered with the foundation by donating $10,000 to jumpstart the program that offers support in the following areas:

- Education – Help veterans find appropriate classes and other programs to complete their undergraduate degrees or pursue advanced degrees.
- Counseling – Assist veterans in coordinating programs with Veteran Affairs departments at colleges, local, state and federal agencies.
- Supportive services – Assist veterans with housing, career, child care, and transitioning into mainstream life

Global Education

The Institute for Shipboard Education (ISE), which administers the Semester at Sea study abroad program, partnered with The Tom Joyner Foundation (TJF) to fund two full scholarships for students attending historically black colleges and universities (HBCUs) to participate in global voyages. ISE and TJF believe that international exposure is a critical element in today's undergraduate education, offering students a real-life global education experience that will give them an edge in this highly competitive job market. The program is open to students, regardless of their major.

Teacher Quality

The foundation is rekindling its partnership with the National Education Association for its Teacher Quality Program, formerly known as the Teacher Certification Program. The program is designed to create new K–12 teachers from HBCU students with a STEM focus.

Art Legacy

As part of its partnerships with black artists, the foundation is celebrating their contributions to HBCUs, the art world and society. These artists' works will be featured throughout the year on its website as well as selling limited editions of some of its pieces.

==== Fantastic Voyage cruise ====
Source:

== Books and other media ==
In 2005 Warner Books published I'm Just a DJ but ... It Makes Sense to Me written with his longtime writer, Mary Flowers Boyce. The book chronicles his childhood and early days in radio as well as offers Joyner's thoughts on Historically Black Colleges and Universities ("HBCUs"), the power of the black consumer and fatherhood. In February 2009, Amber Books published Tom Joyner Presents How to Prepare for College, a primer for parents and their children offering specific suggests and advice. The book features a foreword written by Joyner with writers Wil and Thomas LaVeist. He appeared with his father and grandfather in the documentary "Rising from the Rails: The Story of the Pullman Porter" crediting his family with passing down important values which he passed down to his sons as well. His grandfather Oscar "Doc" Joyner was a Pullman porter who became a medical doctor.

Tom Joyner has had cameo roles in two films-The Gospel (2005) and Madea Goes to Jail (2009). During the early 1980s he was a host of the Ebony/Jet Showcase, a syndicated television magazine program. He also had another television show, The Tom Joyner Sky Show (2003), and has appeared on many other television programs.

== Personal life ==
With his first wife Dora, Joyner has two sons, Thomas Jr. and Oscar, whom he calls "Killer" and "Thriller". After divorcing his first wife, he married celebrity aerobics instructor-fitness expert Donna Richardson in July 2000. The two divorced in May 2012. Joyner is a descendant of North Carolina Supreme Court justice John Hall, and, according to a DNA analysis performed by African Ancestry Inc., is also descended partially from the Balanta people of Guinea-Bissau.

=== Philanthropy ===
Joyner has been an advocate for voter registration and throughout the year promotes voter registration over the air, on his website and during his live "Sky Shows" broadcasts. To improve healthy living, Joyner holds a "Take a Loved One to the Doctor Day" every April or September. On that day, he rallies families and friends to go to the doctor to get a check-up to prevent any health problems, and particularly treat any existing issues. Joyner participated in the 2011 Alzheimer's Association Walk to End Alzheimer's to raise awareness and funds for Alzheimer's research, care and support.

== Awards ==
On October 7, 2004, Joyner was awarded the NAB Marconi Radio Award. In 1998, Joyner was the first African American to be inducted into The National Radio Hall of Fame in Chicago, Illinois. Joyner was inducted into the International Civil Rights Walk of Fame at the Martin Luther King, Jr. National Historic Site on January 12, 2008. Joyner was inducted into The Official R&B Music Hall of Fame on August 17, 2013, in Cleveland, Ohio, at Cleveland State University. On June 28, 2015, Joyner was awarded the Humanitarian Award at the 2015 BET Awards.
