= 2014 deaths in American television =

The following deaths of notable individuals related to American television occurred in 2014.

== January ==
| Date | Name | Age | Notability | Source |
|---|---|---|---|---|
| Jan. 3 | George Goodman | 83 | Economics journalist/author (writing as "Adam Smith") and host of PBS' Adam Smith's Money World | |
| Jan. 5 | Carmen Zapata | 86 | Actress (TV roles including Viva Valdez, Villa Alegre, and Santa Barbara) | |
| Jan. 6 | Mónica Spear | 29 | Actress/model and former Miss Venezuela (TV roles including the Telemundo-produced telenovelas Flor Salvaje, La Mujer Perfecta, Mi Prima Ciela and Pasión Prohibida) | |
| Jan. 6 | Larry D. Mann | 91 | Canadian actor (best known as voice of Yukon Cornelius in Rudolph the Red-Nosed Reindeer; other roles included Gunsmoke, Bewitched, Hogan's Heroes, Green Acres and Hill Street Blues) | |
| Jan. 10 | Eric Lawson | 72 | Actor and model best known as the Marlboro Man in the late 1970s (TV work includes guest roles on Baretta, The Streets of San Francisco, Charlie's Angels, Dynasty, and Baywatch) | |
| Jan. 12 | Frank Marth | 91 | Actor (Guest spots on The Honeymooners, The Fugitive, The Man from U.N.C.L.E., M*A*S*H, and The Young and the Restless) | |
| Jan. 14 | Mae Young | 90 | Professional Wrestling Hall of Famer (First person to wrestle in nine decades; NWA Florida Women's Champion, NWA United States Women's Champion, NWA Women's Tag Team Champion) | |
| Jan. 16 | Russell Johnson | 89 | Actor (Professor Roy Hinkley on Gilligan's Island) | |
| Jan. 16 | Dave Madden | 82 | Actor (Mr. Kincaid on The Partridge Family) | |
| Jan. 17 | Roy Garber | 49 | Businessman and reality television participant (Shipping Wars) | |
| Jan. 18 | Sarah Marshall | 80 | Actress (Credits include a regular role in Miss Winslow & Son, and guest roles in The Twilight Zone, Star Trek, Cheers, Get Smart, Three's Company and Alfred Hitchcock Presents) | |
| Jan. 19 | Ben Starr | 92 | Screenwriter (most notably as co-creator of The Facts of Life and Silver Spoons) | |
| Jan. 22 | Luis Ávalos | 67 | Cuban-born American actor (The Electric Company) | |
| Jan. 22 | Chet Curtis | 74 | News anchor (notable for anchoring at WCVB-TV/Boston from 1972 to 2004, and serving as host of The Chet Curtis Report on New England Cable News from 2004 to 2014) | |
| Jan. 30 | Arthur Rankin, Jr. | 89 | Animator/director and co-founder of Rankin/Bass Productions (producer of Rudolph the Red-Nosed Reindeer, ThunderCats and other animated TV series and specials) | |
| Jan. 31 | Christopher Jones | 72 | Actor (Jesse James in The Legend of Jesse James) | |
| Jan. 31 | Judy Martin | 49 | Television news anchor on News 12 Long Island from 1998 to 2014, as well as CNBC. | |

== February ==
| Date | Name | Age | Notability | Source |
|---|---|---|---|---|
| Feb. 2 | Philip Seymour Hoffman | 46 | Actor (The Yearling, the mini-series Empire Falls and Liberty! The American Revolution) | |
| Feb. 3 | Richard Bull | 89 | Actor (Nels Oleson on Little House on the Prairie, Voyage to the Bottom of the Sea) | |
| Feb. 6 | Ralph Kiner | 91 | Major League Baseball player and TV/radio broadcaster for the New York Mets | |
| Feb. 9 | Eric Bercovici | 80 | Writer/producer (series work including I Spy and Hawaii Five-O, miniseries/movies including Shōgun and Noble House) | |
| Feb. 10 | Doppler the Weathercat | 18 | In-house cat at WSTM-TV/Syracuse, New York | |
| Feb. 10 | Shirley Temple | 85 | Actress (TV work includes Shirley Temple's Storybook) | |
| Feb. 12 | Sid Caesar | 91 | Comedic actor (Your Show of Shows, Caesar's Hour, guest appearances on Saturday Night Live and Whose Line Is It Anyway?) | |
| Feb. 13 | Ralph Waite | 85 | Actor (John Walton, Sr. on The Waltons; the miniseries Roots; recurring roles on NCIS, Kickin' It and Bones) | |
| Feb. 14 | John Henson | 48 | Puppeteer and actor (CityKids, Muppets Tonight, It's a Very Merry Muppet Christmas Movie, The Muppets' Wizard of Oz) | |
| Feb. 15 | Jamie Coots | 42 | Preacher/faith healer and reality television personality (National Geographic Channel's Snake Salvation) | |
| Feb 17 | Mary Grace Canfield | 89 | Actress (best known as Ralph Monroe on Green Acres; guest appearances on General Hospital, The Hathaways, and Bewitched) | |
| Feb. 18 | Nelson Frazier, Jr. | 43 | Professional wrestler, known by the ring names Mabel, Viscera and Big Daddy V (WWF Hardcore Champion and WWF World Tag Team Champion) | |
| Feb. 20 | Garrick Utley | 74 | TV journalist (worked with NBC News, ABC News and CNN) | |
| Feb. 24 | Harold Ramis | 69 | Writer/actor/director (TV work including writer/performer for SCTV and director on The Office) | |
| Feb. 25 | Jim Lange | 81 | Game show host (several shows, most notably The Dating Game) and announcer (The Tennessee Ernie Ford Show) | |
| Feb. 26 | Roger Hill | 65 | Actor (One Life to Live) | |

== March ==
| Date | Name | Age | Notability | Source |
|---|---|---|---|---|
| Mar. 1 | Jim Boyle | 66 | News Director for KSAT-TV | |
| Mar. 2 | Ted Bergmann | 93 | Writer/producer (various shows/specials including Three's Company and Grammy Award telecasts) and executive with DuMont Television Network | |
| Mar. 5 | Geoff Edwards | 83 | Game show host (Starcade, Treasure Hunt, Play the Percentages, Chain Reaction, Jackpot!) and actor (Petticoat Junction) | |
| Mar. 5 | Scott Kalvert | 49 | TV, film, and music video producer/director (executive producer on Nickelodeon's 2009 TV movie School Gyrls) | |
| Mar. 5 | Hank Rieger | 95 | Publicist (work with NBC and his own firm) and former president of Academy of Television Arts & Sciences | |
| Mar. 6 | Sheila MacRae | 92 | English actress, best known as Alice Kramden on The Honeymooners and Madelyn Richmond on General Hospital | |
| Mar. 7 | Hal Douglas | 89 | Voice actor (among television network and commercial clients include The WB, A&E and History) | |
| Mar. 9 | William Guarnere | 90 | World War II hero and author who was portrayed by Frank John Hughes in the HBO mini-series Band of Brothers | |
| Mar. 10 | Cynthia Lynn | 77 | Actress, probably best known for her role as Colonel Klink's secretary Helga in Hogan's Heroes | |
| Mar. 10 | Mike Manhatton | 56 | News anchor at WTOC-TV in Savannah, GA from 1981 to 2014 | |
| Mar. 12 | Richard Coogan | 99 | Actor (Captain Video and His Video Rangers, The Californians) | |
| Mar. 13 | Abby Singer | 96 | TV/film unit production manager and director, who created the penultimate shot (the next to last shot of the day before the last shot) called "The Abby Singer Shot" or "Martini Shot" | |
| Mar. 13 | Debra Steele | 49 | News anchor on WJRT-TV/Flint/Tri-Cities, Michigan from 2003 to 2006 | |
| Mar. 14 | John Agoglia | 76 | TV executive (notably as head of business affairs with NBC and president of subsidiary NBC Enterprises) | |
| Mar. 15 | David Brenner | 78 | Comedian and actor (over 200 appearances on The Tonight Show Starring Johnny Carson as a guest and guest host) | |
| Mar. 19 | Fred Phelps | 84 | Pastor, lawyer and politician (founder of the Westboro Baptist Church in Topeka, Kansas, whose homophobic remarks about the LGBT community, as well as those afflicted with AIDS, earned him a guest spot on Ricki Lake in 1993 (and caused the host to order him and his family to leave the studio) | |
| Mar. 21 | Adrian Taylor | 60 | News producer (60 Minutes, The Early Show), winner of the Peabody Award (2012) | |
| Mar. 22 | Patrice Wymore | 87 | Actress (The Errol Flynn Theatre, Perry Mason); wife of Errol Flynn | |
| Mar. 23 | James Rebhorn | 65 | Actor (Credits include As the World Turns, Guiding Light, Homeland, White Collar and as the district attorney who sent the primary characters in Seinfeld to jail in the 1998 series finale) | |
| Mar. 24 | Dave Brockie | 50 | Canadian musician, best known as "Oderus Urungus", lead singer of metal band Gwar (frequent guest appearances on Red Eye w/Greg Gutfeld and numerous tabloid talk shows) | |
| Mar. 25 | Ralph Wilson | 95 | Businessman, founder of the NFL's Buffalo Bills; owned WWTV (1978–88) and KICU-TV (1981–2000) | |
| Mar. 28 | Lorenzo Semple, Jr. | 91 | Screenwriter (Batman, The Green Hornet) | |
| Mar. 29 | Dane Witherspoon | 56 | Actor (Santa Barbara, Capitol) | |
| Mar. 30 | Kate O'Mara | 74 | British actress, best known for her role on the U.S. drama Dynasty | |
| Mar. 31 | Frankie Knuckles | 59 | DJ and record producer (TV appearances include Unsung, Pump Up the Volume, Rock & Roll, Ibiza: Barefoot in the Med, The 2012 Rock and Roll Hall of Fame Induction Ceremony, NY77: The Coolest Year in Hell, Late Night with Jimmy Fallon, and Yo Gabba Gabba!) | |

== April ==
| Date | Name | Age | Notability | Source |
|---|---|---|---|---|
| Apr. 2 | Sandy Grossman | 78 | Sports director for CBS Sports and Fox Sports, directed 10 Super Bowls | |
| Apr. 5 | John Pinette | 50 | Comedian (known for his appearance on the series finale of Seinfeld) | |
| Apr. 6 | Mary Anderson | 96 | Actress (recurring role on Peyton Place in 1964) | |
| Apr. 6 | Mickey Rooney | 93 | Actor (TV work includes starring roles on Kleo the Misfit Unicorn, The Adventures of the Black Stallion, One of the Boys, The Red Skelton Show, Mickey, and The Mickey Rooney Show: Hey, Mulligan) | |
| Apr. 8 | Jim Hellwig | 54 | WWE Hall of Fame wrestler, known as The Ultimate Warrior, and actor. Former 1-time WWF Champion and 2-time WWF Intercontinental Champion | |
| Apr. 11 | Terry Sams | 80 | Local television personality from Augusta, GA known as Trooper Terry on WJBF (1962–82) | |
| Apr. 11 | Carl Zimmermann | 96 | Reporter/anchor/commentator for WITI/ longest serving broadcaster in Milwaukee history | |
| Apr. 20 | Rubin Carter | 76 | Boxer who served nearly 20 years in prison for a triple murder he did not commit; appeared on several talk shows | |
| Apr. 21 | Craig Hill | 88 | Actor (P.T. Moore in Whirlybirds) | |
| Apr. 26 | Lee Marshall | 64 | Radio and TV announcer and voice-over actor (notably as the voice of Tony the Tiger in the Kellogg's Frosted Flakes commercials and for his work as ring announcer/host with WCW, WWE and AWA) | |
| Apr. 28 | Jack Ramsay | 89 | Basketball coach, later radio and television analyst (color commentary work for the Philadelphia 76ers and Miami Heat, analysis work for ESPN) | |
| Apr. 29 | Bob Hoskins | 71 | English actor (Pennies from Heaven, Rock Follies of '77) | |

== May ==
| Date | Name | Age | Notability | Source |
|---|---|---|---|---|
| May 1 | Patrick Johnson | 45 | Police officers who appeared on the National Geographic Channel reality show Alaska State Troopers | |
| May 1 | Gabriel Rich | 26 | Police officers who appeared on the National Geographic Channel reality show Alaska State Troopers | |
| May 2 | Efrem Zimbalist, Jr. | 95 | Actor (77 Sunset Strip, The F.B.I., Zorro) and voice actor (The Legend of Prince Valiant and Batman: The Animated Series) | |
| May 8 | Nancy Malone | 79 | Actress (Naked City, The Long, Hot Summer), producer (Bob Hope: The First 90 Years), director (several series, notably Sisters and The Trials of Rosie O'Neill), and TV studio executive (20th Century Fox) | |
| May 22 | Matthew Cowles | 69 | Actor (Loving, All My Children, and As the World Turns) | |
| May 23 | Mona Freeman | 87 | Actress (guest spots in Climax!, Playhouse 90, The United States Steel Hour and Perry Mason) | |
| May 25 | Lee Chamberlin | 76 | Actress (The Electric Company, Paris) | |
| May 28 | Maya Angelou | 86 | Author, poet laureate, actress, dancer, director, producer, writer, singer and Civil Rights activist (guest appearances on programs such as Touched by an Angel, and a contributor for talk shows) | |
| May 29 | Bern Bennett | 92 | Announcer for CBS Radio and television for nearly 60 years | |
| May 29 | Ken Schram | 66 | Reporter and commentator with KOMO-TV/Seattle since 1979 | |
| May 30 | Joan Lorring | 88 | Actress (Norby, Studio One, Alfred Hitchcock Presents, Robert Montgomery Presents, Ryan's Hope and The Love Boat) | |
| May 31 | Martha Hyer | 89 | Actress (Lux Video Theatre, The Alfred Hitchcock Hour, Burke's Law) | |

== June ==
| Date | Name | Age | Notability | Source |
|---|---|---|---|---|
| June 1 | Ann B. Davis | 88 | Actress; notable roles include Charmaine Schultz on The Bob Cummings Show and Alice Nelson on The Brady Bunch | |
| June 11 | Glenn Britt | 65 | Former vice president and CFO with Time Inc. and later Chairman/CEO of Time Warner Cable from 2001 to 2013 | |
| June 11 | Ruby Dee | 91 | Actress (Peyton Place, Roots: The Next Generations, The Stand, Street Gear, Little Bill and CSI: Crime Scene Investigation) | |
| June 14 | James E. Rogers | 75 | Former Attorney & Entrepreneur, Owner of Intermountain West Communications Company | |
| June 15 | Casey Kasem | 82 | Actor, musician, disc jockey, radio personality, host (America's Top 10), voice actor (Shaggy Rogers in the Scooby-Doo television series franchise, Robin in the Super Friends franchise, several characters on Transformers) | |
| June 23 | Steve Viksten | 54 | Voice actor (best known as the voice of Oskar Kokoshka on the Nickelodeon animated series Hey Arnold!) and writer (Rugrats, Duckman, Hey Arnold!, Recess, The Off-Beats and The Simpsons) | |
| June 24 | Caleb Bankston | 26 | Reality television show participant that appeared on season 27 of Survivor | |
| June 28 | Meshach Taylor | 67 | Actor (Anthony Bouvier on Designing Women and Sheldon Baylor on Dave's World), game show panelist (To Tell the Truth) and host (HGTV and the Travel Channel) | |
| June 29 | Don Matheson | 84 | Actor (Mark Wilson in Land of the Giants) | |
| June 30 | Bob Hastings | 89 | Actor (McHale's Navy, All in the Family) and voice actor (Batman: The Animated Series) | |

== July ==
| Date | Name | Age | Notability | Source |
|---|---|---|---|---|
| July 3 | James Harness | 57 | Television personality (Gold Rush) | |
| July 5 | Rosemary Murphy | 89 | Actress (Lux Video Theatre, Robert Montgomery Presents, Lucas Tanner, All My Children, Quincy M.E., George Washington, As the World Turns, Civil Wars, In the Heat of the Night, EZ Streets and Frasier) | |
| July 7 | Dick Jones | 87 | Actor (star of Buffalo Bill, Jr., guest/recurring roles included The Gene Autry Show, The Range Rider, Annie Oakley, Gray Ghost, The Blue Angels and Wagon Train) | |
| July 11 | Tommy Ramone | 65 | Singer-songwriter (Ramones) | |
| July 17 | Elaine Stritch | 89 | Actress/singer (3-time Emmy-winning role on Law & Order, 2004 special Elaine Stritch at Liberty, recurring role as Colleen Dongahey on 30 Rock, the original Trixie Norton in Honeymooners sketches, Ruth Sherwood in My Sister Eileen, daytime roles on The Edge of Night and One Life to Live) | |
| July 19 | James Garner | 86 | Emmy Award-winning actor (Bret Maverick in Maverick and its sequel spin-off, Jim Rockford in The Rockford Files and a recurring role on 8 Simple Rules; commercial pitchman for Polaroid cameras; voice of God in God, the Devil and Bob) | |
| July 19 | Skye McCole Bartusiak | 21 | Actress (credits include playing a young Marilyn Monroe in the miniseries Blonde and Megan Matheson in 24) | |
| July 27 | Lew Brown | 89 | Character actor (The Alfred Hitchcock Hour, Death Valley Days, Dragnet, The Virginian, Adam-12, The F.B.I., Gunsmoke, Apple's Way, Emergency! and The Waltons) | |
| July 28 | James Shigeta | 85 | Actor and singer (television credits include a recurring role on Medical Center; guest roles include Hawaii Five-0, The Love Boat, Fantasy Island, Ben Casey, and Murder, She Wrote) | |
| July 30 | Robert Halmi, Sr. | 90 | TV executive (Hallmark Entertainment) and producer (several projects including the films Gypsy and The Lion in Winter and the miniseries Scarlett, Gulliver's Travels, and Merlin) | |

== August ==
| Date | Name | Age | Notability | Source |
|---|---|---|---|---|
| August 1 | Michael Johns | 35 | Singer who competed in the American Idol – season seven | |
| August 5 | Marilyn Burns | 65 | Actress (Linda Kasabian in the mini-series Helter Skelter) | |
| August 11 | Robin Williams | 63 | Actor (notable TV roles include Mork from Ork on Happy Days and Mork & Mindy, Simon Roberts on The Crazy Ones; guest appearances included The Tonight Show Starring Johnny Carson and Whose Line Is It Anyway?) | |
| August 12 | Lauren Bacall | 89 | Actress (TV work included Producers' Showcase and Mr. Broadway, among many others; voiceover for PBS identification during the 1990s) | |
| August 13 | Alan Landsburg | 81 | TV producer/director and founder of the television studio and distribution production company that bears his namesake | |
| August 18 | Don Pardo | 96 | TV and radio personality and announcer (notably as the announcer for Saturday Night Live and numerous game shows) | |
| August 26 | Bryce Dion | 38 | Sound technician on Cops (killed during the taping of a segment) | |
| August 30 | Victoria Mallory | 65 | Singer and actress (Leslie Brooks on The Young and the Restless [1977–84]) | |

== September ==
| Date | Name | Age | Notability | Source |
|---|---|---|---|---|
| Sept. 4 | Joan Rivers | 81 | Actress, comedian, writer, author, producer and host (Fox's The Late Show, permanent weekly guest host on The Tonight Show for four years in the 1980s, her Daytime Emmy-Award-winning syndicated talk show, E! celebrity fashion show Fashion Police and "Red Carpet" host for both E! and TV Guide Channel) | |
| Sept. 5 | Bruce Morton | 83 | TV/radio news reporter, anchor, and commentator with CBS News and CNN | |
| Sept. 5 | Simone Battle | 25 | Singer, actress, reality television participant, and member of the group G.R.L. (The X Factor) | |
| Sept. 6 | Molly Glynn | 46 | Actress (Chicago Fire, Boss) | |
| Sept. 8 | Sean Haire | 43 | Professional wrestler, retired mixed martial arts fighter and kickboxer (3-time WCW World Tag Team Champion), known under the ring name of Sean O'Haire | |
| Sept. 12 | Theodore J. Flicker | 84 | Screenwriter (episodes of The Mod Squad; co-creator of Barney Miller) and director (several shows, including The Dick Van Dyke Show and The Andy Griffith Show) | |
| Sept. 20 | Polly Bergen | 84 | Emmy-award-winning television/film actress, singer, game show panelist, author, and businesswoman (credits include her own self-titled variety series, Playhouse 90, To Tell the Truth, War and Remembrance, and Desperate Housewives) | |
| Sept. 22 | Max Morgan | 59 | Sports anchor and reporter for KDFW | |
| Sept. 26 | Sam Hall | 93 | Screenwriter (head writer for Dark Shadows and One Life to Live) | |
| Sept. 27 | Sarah Danielle Madison | 40 | Actress (7th Heaven, Judging Amy, 90210) | |

== October ==
| Date | Name | Age | Notability | Source |
|---|---|---|---|---|
| Oct. 3 | Kevin Metheny | 60 | Radio and television personality, VJ, programmer, and broadcasting executive (notably as VP/Programming at MTV and VH1, the latter as an occasional VJ/host) | |
| Oct. 5 | Geoffrey Holder | 84 | Actor and dancer (notable as the pitchman for 7 Up's "Uncola" campaign) | |
| Oct. 9 | Jan Hooks | 57 | Actress (cast member on Saturday Night Live, recurring roles on Designing Women, 3rd Rock from the Sun, and 30 Rock) | |
| Oct. 14 | Elizabeth Peña | 55 | American-born Cuban television, film and voice actress (credits include I Married Dora, Modern Family, Justice League and Matador) | |
| Oct. 18 | Joanne Borgella | 32 | Singer, actress, model (competed in American Idol – season seven and Mo'Nique's Fat Chance) | |
| Oct. 20 | Douglas Baker | 80 | Professional wrestler and actor known by his ring name Ox Baker | |
| Oct. 20 | Luther Masingill | 92 | TV and radio personality in the Chattanooga area, notably as a reporter and anchor at WDEF-TV and its former AM and FM sister stations | |
| Oct. 20 | Oscar de la Renta | 82 | Dominican fashion designer (his work was featured on numerous television shows, among them the Ugly Betty episode "Ugly Berry") | |
| Oct. 23 | Terry Keenan | 53 | Business journalist/anchor (work with CNN, CNBC, CNNfn, and Fox News Channel) | |
| Oct. 24 | Marcia Strassman | 66 | Actress (Nurse Margie Cutler on M*A*S*H, Julie Kotter on Welcome Back, Kotter) | |

== November ==
| Date | Name | Age | Notability | Source |
|---|---|---|---|---|
| Nov. 3 | Tom Magliozzi | 77 | Auto mechanic and comedian (along with brother Ray, co-starred in As the Wrench Turns and made a guest appearance on Arthur) | |
| Nov. 4 | Richard Schaal | 86 | Character actor and comedian (Mary Tyler Moore, The Bob Newhart Show, Rhoda) | |
| Nov. 10 | Jovian | 20 | Lemur actor (Zoboomafoo) | |
| Nov. 11 | Carol Ann Susi | 62 | Actress (best known as the voice of the unseen Debbie Wolowitz on The Big Bang Theory) | |
| Nov. 14 | Diem Brown | 32 | Actress, singer and reality television participant (The Challenge, Real World/Road Rules Challenge: Fresh Meat) | |
| Nov. 14 | Glen A. Larson | 77 | Producer and writer (Battlestar Galactica, Quincy, M.E., The Hardy Boys/Nancy Drew Mysteries, B. J. and the Bear, The Fall Guy, Magnum, P.I., Knight Rider) | |
| Nov. 19 | Mike Nichols | 83 | Director, writer, producer and comedian (winner of four Emmy awards for his TV movies and mini-series, and one of 12 performers who have won an Emmy, Grammy, Oscar, and Tony Award) | |
| Nov. 28 | Chespirito | 85 | Mexican actor, comedian and playwright (his character from El Chapulín Colorado inspired Matt Groening to create The Simpsons character Bumblebee Man) | |

== December ==
| Date | Name | Age | Notability | Source |
|---|---|---|---|---|
| Dec. 2 | Topy Mamery | 55 | Vice President and General Manager for Spanish Broadcasting System in Puerto Rico | |
| Dec. 3 | Ann Marcus | 93 | Screenwriter and producer (Mary Hartman, Mary Hartman, Peyton Place, Love Is a Many Splendored Thing, Search for Tomorrow, General Hospital, Days of Our Lives and Knots Landing) | |
| Dec. 6 | Ralph H. Baer | 92 | Engineer and inventor of the home video game (Magnavox Odyssey) | |
| Dec. 7 | Rob Richardson | 41 | Member of the Chrome Shop Mafia featured in Trick My Truck | |
| Dec. 7 | Ken Weatherwax | 59 | Actor, best known as Pugsley Addams on The Addams Family | |
| Dec. 8 | Stephanie Moseley | 30 | Actress, dancer, and reality television participant (Hit the Floor) | |
| Dec. 9 | Mary Ann Mobley | 75 | Actress and Miss America 1959 (credits include playing Maggie McKinney Drummond in Diff'rent Strokes, recurring roles on General Hospital and Burke's Law, and as a panelist on Match Game) | |
| Dec. 9 | Robert Kinoshita | 100 | Artist, art director and production designer (did work for Men Into Space, Sea Hunt, Lock-Up, Bat Masterson, Lost in Space, Hawaii Five-O, Kojak, Project U.F.O., Barnaby Jones) | |
| Dec. 12 | Norman Bridwell | 86 | Author of the Clifford the Big Red Dog children's book series, which was later adopted into an animated series of the same name | |
| Dec. 13 | Bill Bonds | 82 | News anchor (1968–95), mostly on WXYZ-TV/Detroit; also brief stints on WABC-TV/New York City and KABC-TV/Los Angeles (known for popularizing the Action News format) | |
| Dec. 20 | Larry Auerbach | 91 | Director (Love of Life, One Life to Live, All My Children, Another World and As the World Turns) | |
| Dec. 22 | Joseph Sargent | 89 | Director (Lassie, Gunsmoke, The Fugitive, Star Trek: The Original Series, Walt Disney's Wonderful World of Color, The Invaders, TV movies The Marcus-Nelson Murders, Love Is Never Silent, The Karen Carpenter Story, and miniseries Manions of America and Space) | |
| Dec. 22 | Brandon Stoddard | 77 | Executive with ABC and president of ABC Entertainment (responsible for development on series such as The Wonder Years and thirtysomething and movies/miniseries such as Roots and The Day After) | |
| Dec. 22 | Joe Cocker | 70 | British singer whose cover of "With a Little Help from My Friends" was used as the theme song to The Wonder Years | |
| Dec. 22 | Christine Cavanaugh | 51 | Actress and voice actress (Salute Your Shorts, Rugrats, Darkwing Duck, Aaahh!!! Real Monsters, Dexter's Laboratory, 101 Dalmatians: The Series, The Powerpuff Girls) | |
| Dec. 29 | Howard Schultz | 61 | Reality show producer (Extreme Makeover, The Moment of Truth, Dating Naked) | |
| Dec. 30 | Beau Kazer | 63 | Actor (Brock Reynolds on The Young and the Restless) | |
| Dec. 31 | Edward Herrmann | 71 | Actor (known for his Emmy Award-winning role in The Practice and Lorelai's dad on Gilmore Girls) | |

== See also ==
- 2014 in American television
- Deaths in 2014
