= List of awards and nominations received by Mo'Nique =

Mo'Nique awards and nominations
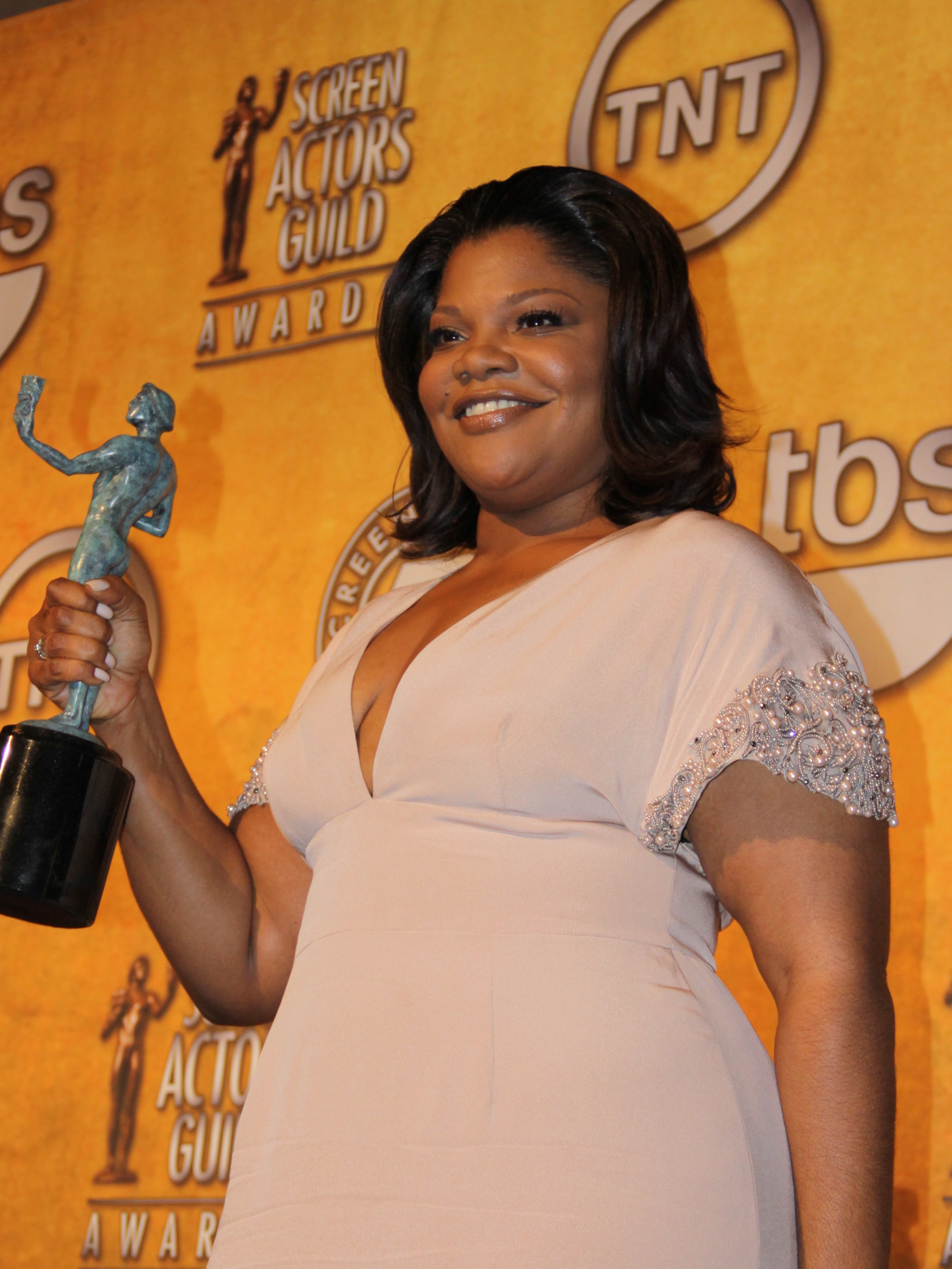
- Mo'Nique at the 16th Screen Actors Guild Awards (2010)
| Award | Wins | Nominations |
Totals
| Academy Awards | 1 | 1 |
| BAFTA Awards | 1 | 1 |
| Golden Globe Awards | 1 | 1 |
| Grammy Awards | 0 | 1 |
| Primetime Emmy Awards | 0 | 1 |
| Screen Actors Guild Awards | 1 | 2 |
| African-American Film Critics Association | 1 | 1 |
| Boston Society of Film Critics | 2 | 2 |
| Central Ohio Film Critics Association | 1 | 1 |
| Chicago Film Critics Association | 1 | 1 |
| Critics Choice Association | 1 | 3 |
| Dallas–Fort Worth Film Critics Association | 1 | 1 |
| Denver Film Critics Society | 1 | 1 |
| Detroit Film Critics Society | 1 | 2 |
| Florida Film Critics Circle | 1 | 1 |
| GALECA: The Society of LGBTQ Entertainment Critics | 0 | 1 |
| Houston Film Critics Society | 0 | 1 |
| IndieWire Critics Poll | 0 | 1 |
| Iowa Film Critics | 1 | 1 |
| Kansas City Film Critics Circle | 1 | 1 |
| Las Vegas Film Critics Society | 1 | 1 |
| London Film Critics' Circle | 1 | 1 |
| Los Angeles Film Critics Association | 1 | 1 |
| National Society of Film Critics | 1 | 1 |
| New York Film Critics Circle | 1 | 1 |
| New York Film Critics Online | 1 | 1 |
| Online Film Critics Society | 1 | 1 |
| Oklahoma Film Critics Circle | 1 | 1 |
| Phoenix Film Critics Society | 1 | 1 |
| San Diego Film Critics Society | 0 | 1 |
| San Francisco Bay Area Film Critics Circle | 1 | 1 |
| Southeastern Film Critics Association | 0 | 1 |
| St. Louis Gateway Film Critics Association | 1 | 2 |
| Toronto Film Critics Association | 0 | 1 |
| Utah Film Critics Association | 1 | 1 |
| Vancouver Film Critics Circle | 0 | 1 |
| Washington D.C. Area Film Critics Association | 1 | 2 |
| Alliance of Women Film Journalists | 3 | 5 |
| Awards Circuit Community Awards | 2 | 2 |
| Beaufort International Film Festival | 0 | 1 |
| BET Awards | 1 | 4 |
| Black Reel Awards | 3 | 4 |
| Chlotrudis Society for Independent Films | 1 | 1 |
| CinEuphoria Award | 1 | 1 |
| Golden Derby Awards | 2 | 4 |
| Golden Schmoes Awards | 1 | 1 |
| Independent Spirit Awards | 1 | 1 |
| Indiana Film Journalists Association | 1 | 1 |
| International Cinephile Society | 0 | 1 |
| International Online Cinema Awards | 1 | 1 |
| NAACP Image Awards | 5 | 9 |
| Online Film & Television Association | 1 | 3 |
| Satellite Awards | 1 | 2 |
| Stockholm International Film Festival | 1 | 1 |
| Sundance Film Festival | 1 | 1 |
| Village Voice Film Poll | 1 | 1 |
| Women's Image Network Awards | 1 | 1 |
| Wins | 59 |
| Nominations | 90 |

Mo'Nique is an American actress and comedian. Over the course of her career, she has been the recipient of a number of award wins and nominations, including a 2001 Grammy Award nomination for Best Comedy Album, and for her critically acclaimed role as Mary Lee Johnston in the 2009 film Precious, for which she received more than 60 nominations; in particular, winning the Academy Award for Best Supporting Actress, the Golden Globe Award for Best Supporting Actress – Motion Picture, and the BAFTA Award for Best Actress in a Supporting Role. In 2015, Mo’Nique received a Primetime Emmy Award for Outstanding Supporting Actress in a Limited Series or Movie nomination, for her role in the television movie Bessie.

She has garnered several award wins and nominations for television work, most notably, for her role as Nikki Parker in the sitcom The Parkers (1999–2004), for which she earned four NAACP Image Awards for Outstanding Supporting Actress in a Comedy Series.

The following is a list of awards and nominations received by Mo'Nique.

== Major award associations ==
=== Academy Awards ===
| Year | Category | Work | Result | Ref. |
|---|---|---|---|---|
| 2010 | Academy Award for Best Supporting Actress | Precious | Won | |

=== BAFTA Awards ===
| Year | Category | Work | Result | Ref. |
|---|---|---|---|---|
| 2010 | BAFTA Award for Best Actress in a Supporting Role | Precious | Won | |

=== Golden Globe Awards ===
| Year | Category | Work | Result | Ref. |
|---|---|---|---|---|
| 2010 | Golden Globe Award for Best Supporting Actress – Motion Picture | Precious | Won | |

=== Grammy Awards ===
| Year | Category | Work | Result | Ref. |
|---|---|---|---|---|
| 2001 | Grammy Award for Best Comedy Album | Queens of Comedy | Nominated | |

=== Primetime Emmy Awards ===
| Year | Category | Work | Result | Ref. |
|---|---|---|---|---|
| 2015 | Primetime Emmy Award for Outstanding Supporting Actress in a Limited Series or Movie (Note: Lost to Regina King for American Crime) | Bessie | Nominated | |

=== Screen Actors Guild Awards ===
| Year | Category | Work | Result | Ref. |
|---|---|---|---|---|
| 2010 | Screen Actors Guild Award for Outstanding Performance by a Female Actor in a Supporting Role | Precious | Won | |
| 2010 | Screen Actors Guild Award for Outstanding Performance by a Cast in a Motion Picture (Note: Shared with Mariah Carey, Lenny Kravitz, Paula Patton, Sherri Shepherd, Gabourey Sidibe. Lost to Inglourious Basterds (2009)) | Precious | Nominated | |

== Critics' awards ==
=== African-American Film Critics Association ===
| Year | Category | Work | Result | Ref. |
|---|---|---|---|---|
| 2009 | African American Film Critics Association Award for Best Supporting Actress | Precious | Won | |

=== Boston Society of Film Critics ===
| Year | Category | Work | Result | Ref. |
|---|---|---|---|---|
| 2009 | Boston Society of Film Critics Award for Best Supporting Actress | Precious | Won | |
| 2009 | Boston Society of Film Critics Award for Best Ensemble (Note: Shared with Gabourey Sidibe, Paula Patton, Mariah Carey, Lenny Kravitz, Sherri Shepherd, Stephanie Andujar, Chyna Layne, Amina Robinson, Angelic Zambrana. Tied with Star Trek (2009)) | Precious | Won | |

=== Central Ohio Film Critics Association ===
| Year | Category | Work | Result | Ref. |
|---|---|---|---|---|
| 2010 | Central Ohio Film Critics Association Award for Best Supporting Actress | Precious | Won | |

=== Chicago Film Critics Association ===
| Year | Category | Work | Result | Ref. |
|---|---|---|---|---|
| 2009 | Chicago Film Critics Association Award for Best Supporting Actress | Precious | Won | |

=== Critics' Choice Association ===
| Year | Category | Work | Result | Ref. |
|---|---|---|---|---|
| 2010 | Critics' Choice Movie Award for Best Supporting Actress (Note: The Critics' Choice Movie Award was formerly known as Broadcast Film Critics Association Award) | Precious | Won | |
| 2010 | Critics' Choice Movie Award for Best Acting Ensemble (Note: Shared with cast. Lost to Inglourious Basterds (2009)) | Precious | Nominated | |
| 2015 | Critics' Choice Television Award for Best Supporting Actress in a Movie/Miniseries (Note: Lost to Sarah Paulson for American Horror Story: Freak Show) | Bessie | Nominated | |

=== Dallas–Fort Worth Film Critics Association ===
| Year | Category | Work | Result | Ref. |
|---|---|---|---|---|
| 2009 | Dallas–Fort Worth Film Critics Association Award for Best Supporting Actress | Precious | Won | |

=== Denver Film Critics Society ===
| Year | Category | Work | Result | Ref. |
|---|---|---|---|---|
| 2010 | Denver Film Critics Society Award for Best Supporting Actress | Precious | Won | |

=== Detroit Film Critics Society ===
| Year | Category | Work | Result | Ref. |
|---|---|---|---|---|
| 2009 | Detroit Film Critics Society for Best Supporting Actress | Precious | Won | |
| 2009 | Detroit Film Critics Society for Best Ensemble (Note: Shared with cast. Lost to The Hangover (2009)) | Precious | Nominated | |

=== Florida Film Critics Circle ===
| Year | Category | Work | Result | Ref. |
|---|---|---|---|---|
| 2009 | Florida Film Critics Circle Award for Best Supporting Actress | Precious | Won | |

=== GALECA: The Society of LGBTQ Entertainment Critics ===
| Year | Category | Work | Result | Ref. |
|---|---|---|---|---|
| 2010 | Dorian Award for Film Performance of the Year (Note: The Dorian Awards are presented by GALECA: The Society of LGBTQ Entertainment Critics. Lost to Colin Firth for A Single Man (2009)) | Precious | Nominated | |

=== Houston Film Critics Society ===
| Year | Category | Work | Result | Ref. |
|---|---|---|---|---|
| 2009 | Houston Film Critics Society Award for Best Supporting Actress (Note: Lost to Anna Kendrick for Up in the Air) | Precious | Nominated | |

=== IndieWire Critics Poll ===
| Year | Category | Work | Result | Ref. |
|---|---|---|---|---|
| 2009 | IndieWire Critics' Poll for Best Supporting Performance (Note: 2nd Place. Lost to Christoph Waltz for Inglourious Basterds (2009)) | Precious | Nominated | |

=== Iowa Film Critics ===
| Year | Category | Work | Result | Ref. |
|---|---|---|---|---|
| 2010 | Iowa Film Critics Award for Best Supporting Actress | Precious | Won | |

=== Kansas City Film Critics Circle ===
| Year | Category | Work | Result | Ref. |
|---|---|---|---|---|
| 2009 | Kansas City Film Critics Circle Award for Best Supporting Actress | Precious | Won | |

=== Las Vegas Film Critics Society ===
| Year | Category | Work | Result | Ref. |
|---|---|---|---|---|
| 2009 | Las Vegas Film Critics Society Award for Best Supporting Actress | Precious | Won | |

=== London Film Critics' Circle ===
| Year | Category | Work | Result | Ref. |
|---|---|---|---|---|
| 2010 | London Film Critics' Circle Award for Actress of the Year | Precious | Won | |

=== Los Angeles Film Critics Association ===
| Year | Category | Work | Result | Ref. |
|---|---|---|---|---|
| 2009 | Los Angeles Film Critics Association Award for Best Supporting Actress | Precious | Won | |

=== National Society of Film Critics ===
| Year | Category | Work | Result | Ref. |
|---|---|---|---|---|
| 2010 | National Society of Film Critics Award for Best Supporting Actress | Precious | Won | |

=== New York Film Critics Circle ===
| Year | Category | Work | Result | Ref. |
|---|---|---|---|---|
| 2009 | New York Film Critics Circle Award for Best Supporting Actress | Precious | Won | |

=== New York Film Critics Online ===
| Year | Category | Work | Result | Ref. |
|---|---|---|---|---|
| 2009 | New York Film Critics Online Award for Best Supporting Actress | Precious | Won | |

=== Online Film Critics Society ===
| Year | Category | Work | Result | Ref. |
|---|---|---|---|---|
| 2010 | Online Film Critics Society Award for Best Supporting Actress | Precious | Won | |

=== Oklahoma Film Critics Circle ===
| Year | Category | Work | Result | Ref. |
|---|---|---|---|---|
| 2009 | Oklahoma Film Critics Circle Award for Best Supporting Actress | Precious | Won | |

=== Phoenix Film Critics Society ===
| Year | Category | Work | Result | Ref. |
|---|---|---|---|---|
| 2009 | Phoenix Film Critics Society Award for Best Performance by an Actress in a Supporting Role | Precious | Won | |

=== San Diego Film Critics Society ===
| Year | Category | Work | Result | Ref. |
|---|---|---|---|---|
| 2009 | San Diego Film Critics Society Award for Best Supporting Actress (Note: Lost to Samantha Morton for The Messenger (2009)) | Precious | Nominated | |

=== San Francisco Bay Area Film Critics Circle ===
| Year | Category | Work | Result | Ref. |
|---|---|---|---|---|
| 2009 | San Francisco Bay Area Film Critics Circle Award for Best Supporting Actress | Precious | Won | |

=== Southeastern Film Critics Association ===
| Year | Category | Work | Result | Ref. |
|---|---|---|---|---|
| 2009 | Southeastern Film Critics Association Award for Best Supporting Actress | Precious | Won | |

=== St. Louis Gateway Film Critics Association ===
| Year | Category | Work | Result | Ref. |
|---|---|---|---|---|
| 2009 | St. Louis Gateway Film Critics Association Award for Best Supporting Actress | Precious | Won | |
| 2009 | St. Louis Film Critics Association Special Merit (Note: For best scene - Mo'Nique at the social worker office. Lost to Up (2009)) | Precious | Nominated | |

=== Toronto Film Critics Association ===
| Year | Category | Work | Result | Ref. |
|---|---|---|---|---|
| 2009 | Toronto Film Critics Association Award for Best Supporting Actress (Note: Lost to Anna Kendrick for Up in the Air (2009)) | Precious | Nominated | |

=== Utah Film Critics Association ===
| Year | Category | Work | Result | Ref. |
|---|---|---|---|---|
| 2009 | Utah Film Critics Association Award for Best Supporting Actress | Precious | Won | |

=== Vancouver Film Critics Circle ===
| Year | Category | Work | Result | Ref. |
|---|---|---|---|---|
| 2010 | Vancouver Film Critics Circle Award for Best Supporting Actress (Note: Lost to Vera Farmiga for Up in the Air (2009)) | Precious | Nominated | |

=== Washington D.C. Area Film Critics Association ===
| Year | Category | Work | Result | Ref. |
|---|---|---|---|---|
| 2009 | Washington D.C. Area Film Critics Association Award for Best Supporting Actress | Precious | Won | |
| 2009 | Washington D.C. Area Film Critics Association Award for Best Ensemble (Note: Shared with Lenny Kravitz, Paula Patton, Gabourey Sidibe, Mariah Carey, Sherri Shepherd, Stephanie Andujar, Chyna Layne, Amina Robinson, Xosha Roquemore. Lost to The Hurt Locker (2008)) | Precious | Nominated | |

== Other ==
=== Alliance of Women Film Journalists ===
| Year | Category | Work | Result | Ref. |
|---|---|---|---|---|
| 2009 | EDA Award for Best Actress in a Supporting Role (Note: EDA (Excellent Dynamic Activism) is awarded by the Alliance of Women Film Journalists) | Precious | Won | |
| 2009 | EDA Award for Best Ensemble Cast (Note: Lost to The Hurt Locker (2008)) | Precious | Nominated | |
| 2009 | EDA 'Bravest Performance Award' | Precious | Won | |
| 2009 | EDA 'Special Mention Award' | Precious | Won | |
| 2017 | EDA Special Mention Award - 'Hall of Shame' (Note: Shared with David E. Talbert. Lost to Sharon Maguire and Renée Zellweger for Bridget Jones's Baby) | Almost Christmas | Nominated | |

=== Awards Circuit Community Awards ===
| Year | Category | Work | Result | Ref. |
|---|---|---|---|---|
| 2009 | ACCA for Best Actress in a Supporting Role | Precious | Won | |
| 2012 | ACCA for Best Supporting Actress of the Decade | Precious | Won | |

=== Beaufort International Film Festival ===
| Year | Category | Work | Result | Ref. |
|---|---|---|---|---|
| 2016 | Beaufort International Film Festival Award for Best Actress (Note: Lot to Maritza Brikisak for A Prayer for the Lonely) | Interwoven | Nominated | |

=== BET Awards ===
| Year | Category | Work | Result | Ref. |
|---|---|---|---|---|
| 2004 | BET Comedy Award for Outstanding Supporting Actress in a Box Office Movie (Note: Lost to Queen Latifah for Barbershop 2: Back in Business (2004)) | Soul Plane | Nominated | |
| 2004 | BET Comedy Award for Outstanding Lead Actress in a Comedy Series (Note: Lost to Tisha Campbell-Martin for My Wife and Kids) | The Parkers (Season 4) | Nominated | |
| 2005 | BET Comedy Award for Outstanding Lead Actress in a Theatrical Film (Note: Lost to Kimberly Elise for Diary of a Mad Black Woman (2005)) | Hair Show | Nominated | |
| 2010 | BET Award for Best Actress | Precious | Won | |

=== Black Reel Awards ===
| Year | Category | Work | Result | Ref. |
|---|---|---|---|---|
| 2004 | Black Reel Award for Outstanding Supporting Actress, TV Movie or Limited Series | Good Fences | Won | |
| 2010 | Black Reel Award for Outstanding Ensemble | Precious | Won | |
| 2010 | Black Reel Award for Outstanding Supporting Actress | Precious | Won | |
| 2016 | Black Reel Award for Outstanding Supporting Actress, TV Movie or Limited Series | Bessie | Nominated | |

=== Chlotrudis Society for Independent Films ===
| Year | Category | Work | Result | Ref. |
|---|---|---|---|---|
| 2010 | Chlotrudis Award for Best Supporting Actress | Precious | Won | |

=== CinEuphoria Award ===
| Year | Category | Work | Result | Ref. |
|---|---|---|---|---|
| 2011 | CinEuphoria Award for Best Duo – International Competition (Note: Shared with Gabourey Sidibe) | Precious | Won | |

=== Golden Derby Awards ===
| Year | Category | Work | Result | Ref. |
|---|---|---|---|---|
| 2010 | Gold Derby film Award for Supporting Actress | Precious | Won | |
| 2010 | Gold Derby Film Award for Best Ensemble (Note: Shared with Mariah Carey, Lenny Kravitz, Paula Patton, Sherri Shepherd, Gabourey Sidibe. Lost to Inglourious Basterds (2009)) | Precious | Nominated | |
| 2010 | Gold Derby Film Award for Supporting Actress of the Decade | Precious | Won | |
| 2015 | Gold Derby TV Award for TV Movie/Mini Supporting Actress (Note: Lost to Sarah Paulson for American Horror Story: Freak Show) | Bessie | Nominated | |

=== Golden Schmoes Awards ===
| Year | Category | Work | Result | Ref. |
|---|---|---|---|---|
| 2009 | Golden Schmoes Award for Best Supporting Actress (Note: Golden Schmoes Awards are presented by JoBlo.com) | Precious | Won | |

=== Independent Spirit Awards ===
| Year | Category | Work | Result | Ref. |
|---|---|---|---|---|
| 2010 | Independent Spirit Award for Best Supporting Female | Precious | Won | |

=== Indiana Film Journalists Association ===
| Year | Category | Work | Result | Ref. |
|---|---|---|---|---|
| 2009 | Indiana Film Journalists Association Award for Best Supporting Actress | Precious | Won | |

=== International Cinephile Society ===
| Year | Category | Work | Result | Ref. |
|---|---|---|---|---|
| 2010 | ICS Award for Best Supporting Actress (Note: Lost to Vera Farmiga for Up in the Air (2009)) | Precious | Nominated | |

=== International Online Cinema Awards ===
| Year | Category | Work | Result | Ref. |
|---|---|---|---|---|
| 2010 | INOCA for Best Supporting Actress | Precious | Won | |

=== NAACP Image Awards ===
| Year | Category | Work | Result | Ref. |
|---|---|---|---|---|
| 2001 | NAACP Image Award for Outstanding Actress in a Comedy Series | The Parkers (Season 1) | Won | |
| 2002 | NAACP Image Award for Outstanding Supporting Actress in a Motion Picture (Note: Lost to Angela Bassett for The Score (2001)) | Two Can Play That Game | Nominated | |
| 2002 | NAACP Image Award for Outstanding Actress in a Comedy Series | The Parkers (Season 2) | Won | |
| 2003 | NAACP Image Award for Outstanding Actress in a Comedy Series (Note: Lost to Tisha Campbell-Martin for My Wife and Kids) | The Parkers (Season 3) | Nominated | |
| 2004 | NAACP Image Award for Outstanding Actress in a Television Movie, Mini-Series or Dramatic Special (Note: Lost to Whoopi Goldberg for Good Fences (2003)) | Good Fences | Nominated | |
| 2004 | NAACP Image Award for Outstanding Actress in a Comedy Series | The Parkers (Season 4) | Won | |
| 2005 | NAACP Image Award for Outstanding Actress in a Comedy Series | The Parkers (Season 5) | Won | |
| 2010 | NAACP Image Award for Outstanding Supporting Actress in a Motion Picture | Precious | Won | |
| 2017 | NAACP image Award for Outstanding Supporting Actress in a Motion Picture (Note: Lost to Viola Davis for Fences) | Almost Christmas | Nominated | |

=== Online Film & Television Association ===
| Year | Category | Work | Result | Ref. |
|---|---|---|---|---|
| 2009 | OFTA Film Award for Best Supporting Actress | Precious | Won | |
| 2015 | OFTA Television Award for Best Supporting Actress in a Movie/Miniseries (Note: Lost to Kathy Bates for American Horror Story: Freak Show) | Bessie | Nominated | |
| 2015 | OFTA Television Award for Best Ensemble in a Movie/Miniseries (Note: Lost to Olive Kitteridge (2014 miniseries)) | Bessie | Nominated | |

=== Satellite Awards ===
| Year | Category | Work | Result | Ref. |
|---|---|---|---|---|
| 2009 | Satellite Award for Best Supporting Actress – Motion Picture | Precious | Won | |
| 2016 | Satellite Award for Best Supporting Actress – Series, Miniseries or Television Film (Note: Lost to Rhea Seehorn for Better Call Saul) | Bessie | Nominated | |

=== Stockholm International Film Festival ===
| Year | Category | Work | Result | Ref. |
|---|---|---|---|---|
| 2009 | Stockholm International Film Festival Award for Best Actress | Precious | Won | |

=== Sundance Film Festival ===
| Year | Category | Work | Result | Ref. |
|---|---|---|---|---|
| 2009 | Sundance Film Festival Special Jury Prize for Acting | Precious | Won | |

=== Village Voice Film Poll ===
| Year | Category | Work | Result | Ref. |
|---|---|---|---|---|
| 2009 | VVFP Award for Best Supporting Actress | Precious | Won | |

=== Women's Image Network Awards ===
| Year | Category | Work | Result | Ref. |
|---|---|---|---|---|
| 2006 | WIN Award for Outstanding Reality Series (Note: Shared with executive producers Don Weiner and Steven Imes) | Mo'Nique's Fat Chance | Won | |
