= Borgella =

Borgella is a surname. Notable people with this surname include:

- Bianca Borgella (born 2003), Canadian para-athlete
- Jérôme-Maximilien Borgella (1773–1844), Haitian general and politician
- Joanne Borgella (1982–2014), American singer and model
- Jocelyn Borgella (born 1971), American football player
- Roselord Borgella (born 1993), Haitian footballer
