= Larry Duplechan =

American novelist

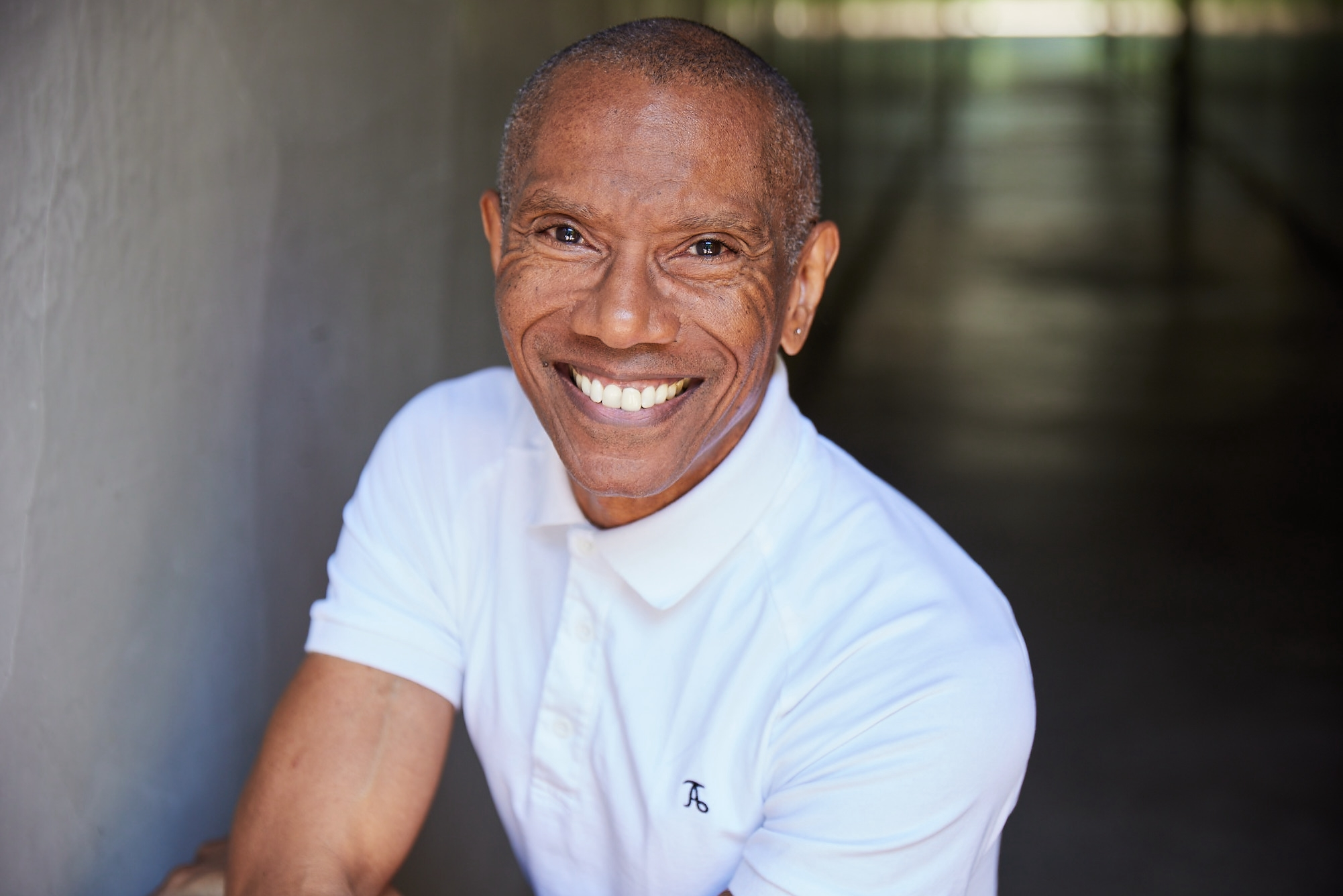
- Duplechan in 2023
- Born: December 30, 1956 (age 69)
- Occupation: Novelist
- Spouse: Greg Harvey
- Writing career
- Period: 1980s–present
- Notable works: Blackbird, Got 'til It's Gone

Larry Duplechan (born December 30, 1956, in Los Angeles, California) is an American novelist. He is best known for his novels Blackbird, adapted in 2014 by Patrik-Ian Polk as a film starring Mo'Nique and Isaiah Washington, and Got 'til It's Gone, which won an award in the Gay Romance category at the 21st Lambda Literary Awards.

== Background ==
Duplechan was born on December 30, 1956, in Los Angeles, California. He attended the University of California, Los Angeles, where he studied English and participated in the university's men's choir. After graduation, he initially pursued a career in music, both as a solo singer and as a member of a jazz vocal group, but gave it up after the time demands of pursuing music while also holding down a full-time day job began to threaten his relationship with his partner Greg Harvey.

== Writing ==
Duplechan published his first novel, Eight Days a Week, in 1985. The novel introduced Johnnie Ray Rousseau, the lead character in nearly all of his subsequent novels. Blackbird, a prequel novel focusing on Rousseau's childhood, was published the following year and more strongly established Duplechan's reputation as an important writer of gay African-American fiction. He has also been identified as one of the first important gay writers to have come of age after the Stonewall riots, and whose writing thus lacked the internalized homophobia that often characterized the work of the previous generation of gay writers.

In 1990, he published Tangled Up in Blue, an AIDS-themed novel which was his only work not to feature Rousseau as its central character, although its main characters reappear in Duplechan's subsequent Rousseau novels as supporting characters. The novel dealt with a married couple, Maggie and Daniel Sullivan, whose relationship is tested when Maggie discovers that Daniel is bisexual and was once in a relationship with her gay friend Crockett Miller.

Duplechan's next novel Captain Swing (1993) returned to Rousseau, and found him grieving the death of his boyfriend Keith in a car accident.

After Captain Swing, Duplechan took a hiatus from writing for several years and returned to singing, founding an a cappella vocal group and participating in community choirs after the home he shared with Harvey was damaged in the 1994 Northridge earthquake. A new 20th anniversary edition of Blackbird was published by Arsenal Pulp Press in 2006, and Duplechan's most recent novel to date, Got 'til It's Gone, was published by the same company in 2008.

In 2022, Duplechan contracted with Team Angelica, London, to write a movie memoir, Movies That Made Me Gay, which was published in October 2023.

In addition to his novels, his work has also been published in numerous anthologies, including Freedom in This Village: Twenty-Five Years of Black Gay Men's Writing (2005), The Lost Library: Gay Fiction Rediscovered (2010) and Mighty Real: An Anthology of African American Same Gender Loving Writing (2011).

== Personal life ==
Duplechan and Harvey legally married in 2008, during the period between the initial legalization of same-sex marriage in California and the passage of Proposition 8.

He has pursued studies in comparative religion. He served for several years as a deacon for a Metropolitan Community Church congregation, and considered entering the seminary. He and Harvey later attended the Westwood Presbyterian Church in Los Angeles. Since 2018, they enjoyed a “friends of the church” relationship with an Episcopal church in Monrovia, California, where they often sang in the choir. Since 2024, they have attended Woodland Hills Community Church, a United Church of Christ in a suburb of Los Angeles.

== Works ==
- Eight Days a Week (1985, ISBN 978-0932870841)
- Blackbird (1986, ISBN 978-1551522029)
- Tangled Up in Blue (1990, ISBN 978-0312051679)
- Captain Swing (1993, ISBN 978-1555832346)
- Got 'til it's Gone (2008, ISBN 978-1551522449)
- Movies That Made Me Gay (2023, ISBN 173-9773918)
