= Martin Warner =

British businessman (born 1972)

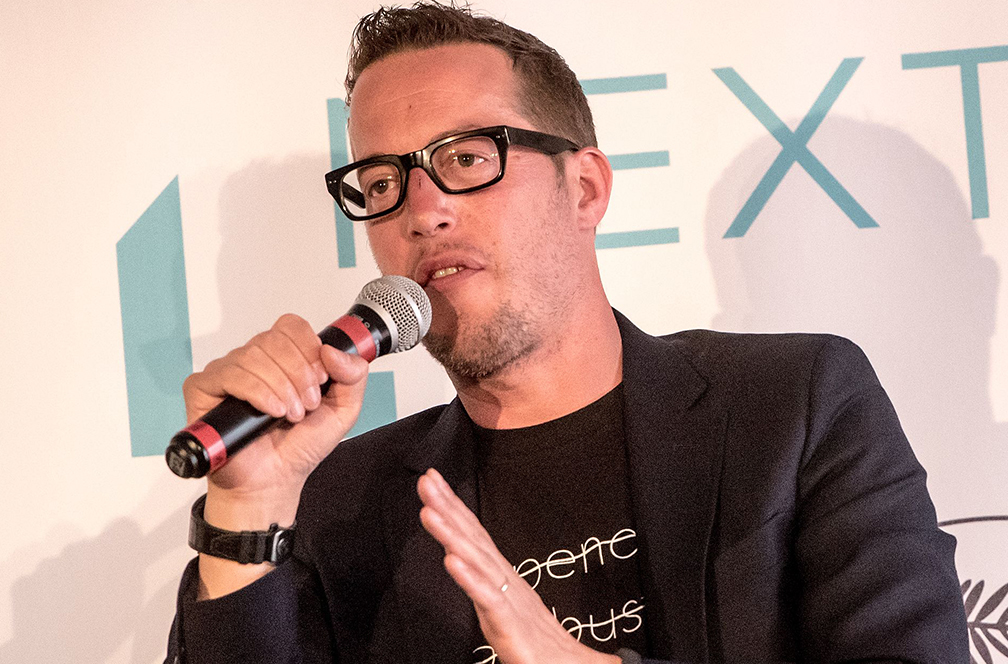
- Martin Warner in 2016
- Born: 1972 (age 53–54); Kent, England
- Occupation: Businessman
- Title: CEO and founder, Flix Premiere; Chairman and founder, Autonomous Flight
- Website: https://www.martinwarner.com

Martin Warner (born 1972) is a British entrepreneur and businessman. He has founded several technology businesses, including botObjects (3D printing), Flix Premiere (video streaming), Autonomous Flight (battery-powered aircraft), and warpSpeed (AI application).

== Career ==
With Mike Duma, Warner founded botObjects, a 3D printer manufacturer - the first company to commercialise a full-colour printer using the fused filament fabrication technique. BotObjects' 5-colour CMYKW cartridge system was claimed to be able to generate colour combinations and gradients by mixing primary printing colours, though there was some scepticism about botObjects' claims. In January 2015, the company was acquired by 3D Systems.

In 2016, Flix Premiere, a British media-services provider, provided a subscription-based streaming OTT service, which offered online streaming of films, including some produced in-house. Two months after its UK opening, it premiered in the United States. The Guardian described the site as "the Lidl of indie cinema", noting there were few familiar titles available on the site, but that those available were the "best of the bunch" from film festivals and not available on other platforms.

Warner also founded Autonomous Flight, a developer of electric vertical take-off and landing (eVTOL) aircraft, including the Y6S and the larger six-seat Y6S Plus.

In 2024, Warner launched an AI application called warpSpeed.
