= Blackbird (2014 film) =

- Directed by: Patrik-Ian Polk
- Screenplay by: Rikki Beadle-Blair; Patrik-Ian Polk
- Based on: Blackbird; 1986 novel by Larry Duplechan
- Produced by: Keith Louis Brown; Patrik-Ian Polk; Carol Ann Shine; Isaiah Washington; Matthew Young
- Starring: Mo'Nique; Isaiah Washington; Kevin Allesee; Gary L. Gray; Nikki Jane; Torrey Laamar; Terrell Tilford; D. Woods; Julian Walker
- Cinematography: Eun-ah Lee
- Edited by: Bryan Colvin
- Music by: Adam Samuel Goldman
- Production companies: KBiz Entertainment; Tall Skinny Black Boy Productions
- Distributed by: RLJ Entertainment
- Release dates: February 16, 2014 (Pan African Film Festival); April 24, 2015
- Running time: 99 minutes
- Country: United States
- Language: English

Blackbird is a 2014 drama film directed by Patrik-Ian Polk and starring Mo'Nique and Isaiah Washington. The film is adapted from the novel of the same name by Larry Duplechan and was released theatrically on April 24, 2015.

== Premise ==
Set in a small baptist community in the south of Mississippi, a 17-year-old high school senior and talented singer juggles with his sexuality and religion while also dealing with the disappearance of his younger sister as it tore his family apart.

== Cast ==
- Julian Walker as Randy Rousseau
- Mo'Nique as Claire Rousseau
- Isaiah Washington as Lance Rousseau
- Kevin Allesee as Marshall MacNeil
- Terrell Tilford as Pastor Crandall
- D. Woods as Leslie Crandall
- Gary LeRoi Gray as Efrem
- Torrey Laamar as Todd Waterson
- Nikki Jane as Crystal

== Background ==
Polk initially tried to get the film made several years earlier, with Jussie Smollett cast as the young lead, however financing fell through. When the funding came through years later, he was forced to re-cast because of Smollett's busy schedule on Empire, and struggled to find a black male actor who would portray a gay love story on screen. However, he later met Julian Walker, who is openly gay, and chose to cast him despite his lack of acting experience.

Polk discussed, in an interview with BuzzFeed, the need for more stories featuring gay men who aren't white:

Through my years of filmmaking, we have seen the gay coming-of-age story from every possible white male point of view ... We’ve seen it over, and over, and over.

== Release ==
The film had a successful run on the film festival circuit, winning awards at several LGBT-oriented festivals including Outflix Memphis, Atlanta’s Out On Film Festival, and the Crossroads Film Festival in Polk’s native Mississippi. The film was the closing night gala screening for Los Angeles’ Pan African Film Festival (PAFF), where it won the Founders Award for Best Narrative Feature Film.

== Reception ==
Blackbird received mixed to negative reviews from critics. As of May 2025, 45% of the 11 reviews compiled on Rotten Tomatoes are positive, with an average rating of 4.6/10. The Hollywood Reporter called it "too all over the map to take seriously." The New York Times said that the film has an "impressive, palpable conviction," although it ultimately "suffers from soapy excesses and narrative disjunctures." Slant Magazine wrote: "Blackbird is, like its main character, too naïve to understand or, at least, to deploy the reparative powers of camp."

== See also ==
- List of black films of the 2010s
