= Interwoven =

- Directed by: V.W. Scheich
- Written by: V.W. Scheich; Uyen Le
- Produced by: Jeffrey Allard; Uyen Le; Kat Rogers; V.W. Scheich
- Starring: Mo'Nique; Myles Cranford; Jon Eiswerth; Brooke Burgstahler
- Cinematography: Wey Wang
- Edited by: V.W. Scheich
- Production companies: Hicks Media Productions; Arts Work; Indie Entertainment; RareForm Pictures
- Distributed by: Flix Premiere
- Release dates: April 30, 2016 (Hill Country); July 1, 2016
- Running time: 88 minutes
- Country: United States
- Language: English

Interwoven is a 2016 American independent drama film directed by V.W. Scheich and starring Mo'Nique, Myles Cranford, Jon Eiswerth and Brooke Burgstahler. It follows fifteen true life social stories. The film was released by Flix Premiere on July 1, 2016.

Interwoven was screened on multiple independent film festivals, notable receiving Honorable Mention at the 2016 Myrtle Beach International Film Festival. At the 2016 Beaufort International Film Festival it received Audience Choice Award while Mo'Nique was nominated for a Best Actress.

== Cast ==
- Mo'Nique as Barbara
- Brooke Burgstahler as Jessie
- Myles Cranford as Otis
- Jon Eiswerth as Luke
- Kenichi Iwabuchi as Takashi
- Keenon Harris as Derek
- Cecilia Yesuil Kim as June
- Aviva Pressman as Young Joanne
- Hilary Barraford as Jill
- Jillean Tucker as Mandy
- Carlotta Elektra Bosch as Helena
- Georgia Van Cuylenburg as Grace
