= Mo'Nique =

American comedian and actress (born 1967)

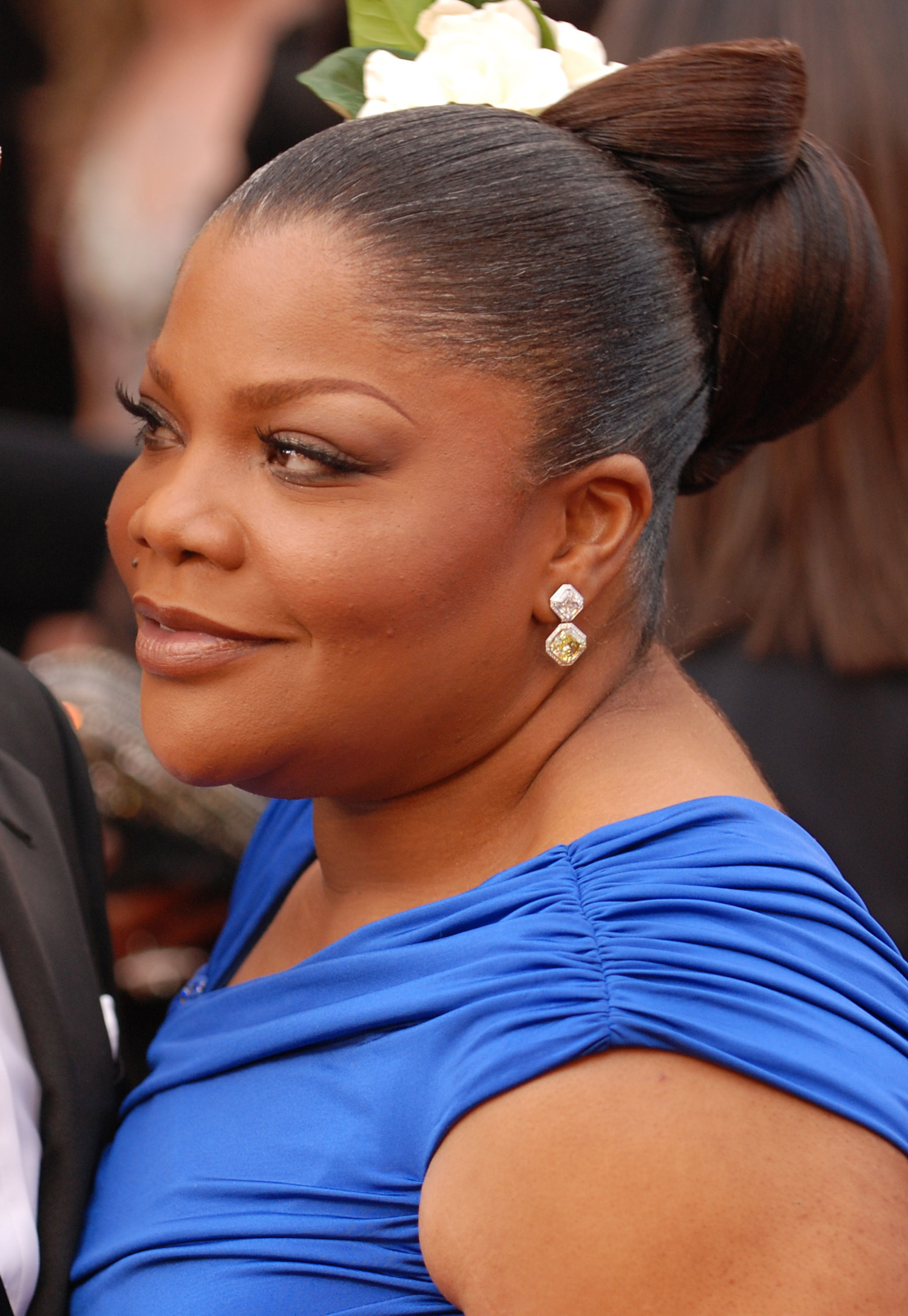
- Mo'Nique at the 82nd Academy Awards in 2010
- Born: Monique Angela Imes; December 11, 1967 (age 58); Woodlawn, Maryland, U.S.
- Other name: Monique Hicks
- Occupations: Comedian; actress; talk show host; author
- Years active: 1990–present
- Works: Full list
- Spouses: Calvin Watkins (divorced); Mark Jackson (m. 1997; div. 2001); Sidney Hicks (m. 2006)
- Children: 3
- Awards: Full list
- Website: therealmoworldwide.com

Monique Angela Hicks (née Imes; born December 11, 1967), known mononymously as Mo'Nique, is an American comedian and actress. She debuted as a member of The Queens of Comedy and earned recognition as a stand-up comedian. In 2002, she received a nomination for the Grammy Award for Best Comedy Album. She transitioned to mainstream roles starring in the UPN series The Parkers (1999–2004) and the films Phat Girlz (2006) and Welcome Home Roscoe Jenkins (2008).

Mo'Nique received critical acclaim for her performance in the film Precious (2009), for which she won the Academy Award for Best Supporting Actress, becoming the fourth African-American woman to win the award, in addition to accolades at the BAFTA, Golden Globe, and Screen Actors Guild Awards. After hosting her talk show The Mo'Nique Show (2009–2011), she earned a Primetime Emmy Award nomination for the HBO film Bessie (2015) and later starred in Lee Daniels' Netflix film The Deliverance (2024).

== Early life ==
Mo'Nique was born on December 11, 1967, in Woodlawn, Baltimore County, Maryland, the daughter of engineer Alice Imes and drug counselor Steven Imes Jr. She is the youngest of four children. Mo'Nique graduated from Milford Mill High School in Baltimore County in 1985 and attended Morgan State University. She is a 1987 graduate of the Broadcasting Institute of Maryland.

Before she was an actress, Monique worked as a customer service representative at the phone company MCI in Hunt Valley, Maryland. She got her start in comedy at the downtown Baltimore Comedy Factory Outlet when her brother Steve dared her to perform at an open mic night.

During a 2008 Essence magazine interview, Mo'Nique revealed that she was sexually abused by her brother Gerald from ages 7 to 11; he went on to sexually abuse another girl and was sentenced to 12 years in prison. After her twin boys were born in 2005, Mo'Nique cut off all contact with Gerald. On April 19, 2010, he admitted on Oprah to sexually abusing her over several years. He also was abused by family members and struggled with substance abuse.

== Career ==
Mo'Nique portrayed Nicole "Nikki" Parker on the UPN television series The Parkers from 1999 to 2004. She was featured on many leading stand-up venues, such as Showtime at the Apollo, Russell Simmons' Def Comedy Jam, and Thank God You're Here. Mo'Nique tackles race issues in her stand up routines, for instance at the Montreal Just For Laugh Festival in 2000: "White and black people, we're just mad at each other, we don't know why we're mad at each other. We're not each other's enemy. We're not the enemy. It's the Chinese people we need to watch out for".

In 2005, Mo'Nique played a significant role in Tony Scott's thriller Domino, co-starring Keira Knightley and Mickey Rourke. In 2006, Mo'Nique was cast as the lead in Phat Girlz, a comedy about an aspiring fashion designer struggling to find love and acceptance. The film was met with lukewarm response from critics and fans. It did earn back its $3 million production cost in its first weekend of release.

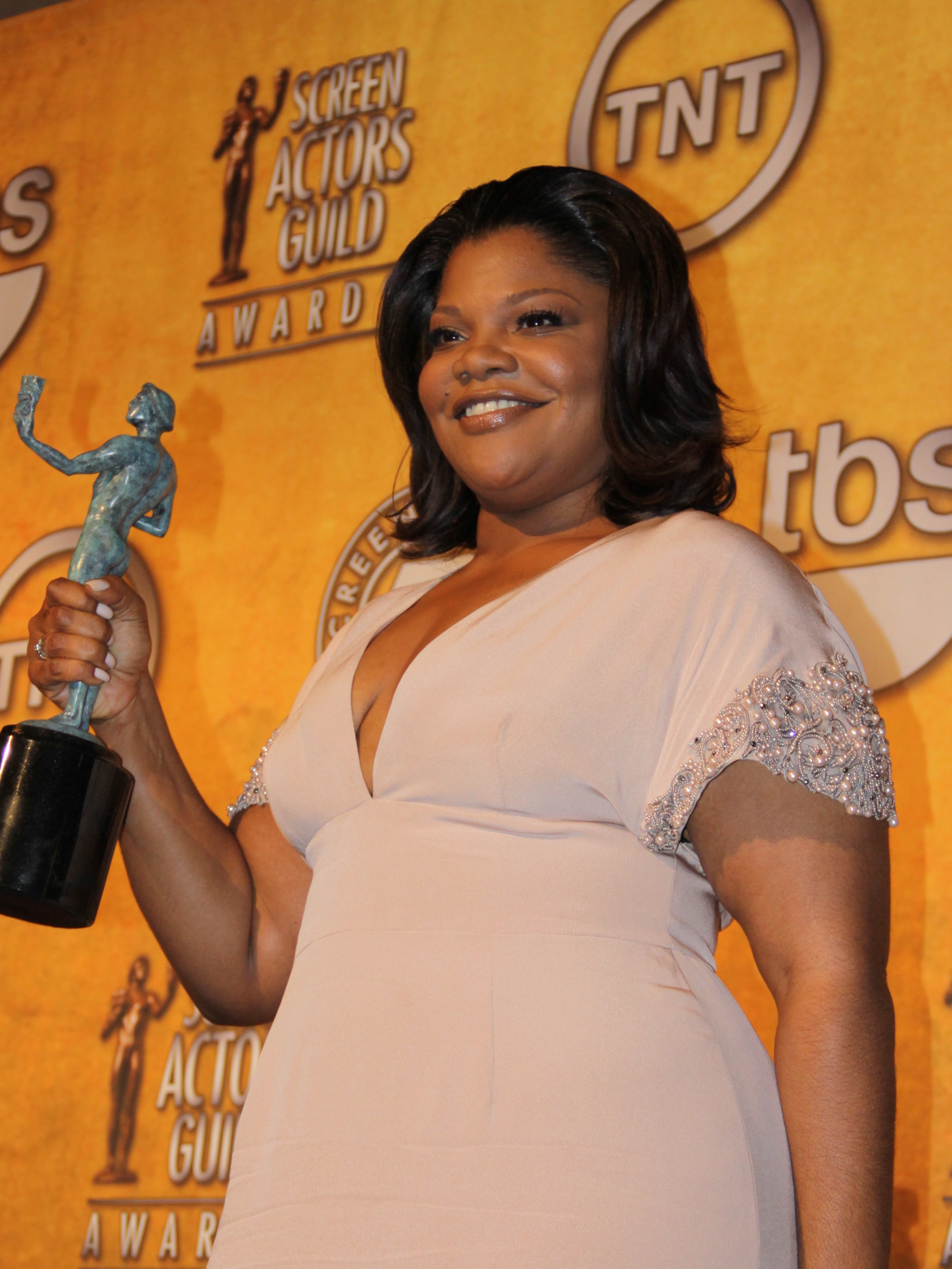
Mo'Nique at the 2010 Screen Actors Guild Awards

Mo'Nique's first play was Eve Ensler's Obie Award-winning production of The Vagina Monologues in March 2002. Mo'Nique, Ella Joyce (Roc); Wendy Raquel Robinson (The Steve Harvey Show and The Game) and Vanessa Bell Calloway (What's Love Got to Do with It), were the first all black celebrity cast to perform The Vagina Monologues. Produced by YYP & Associates, the show was directed by playwright and director Yetta Young as well as co-produced by Kellie R. Griffin, Lisa D. Washington and Anita Cal. Mo'Nique is the author of the best-selling book Skinny Women Are Evil: Notes of a Big Girl in a Small-Minded World. She also released a 2006 cookbook called Skinny Cooks Can't Be Trusted. Mo'nique was part of the Washington, D.C., WHUR radio show with George Wilborn. In 2006, she occasionally filled in for afternoon personality Michael Baisden when his contract with ABC Radio was in the process of getting renewed.

She was also named hostess of Showtime at the Apollo. She was the hostess and executive producer of Mo'Nique's Fat Chance, a beauty pageant for plus-sized women, on the Oxygen cable network. She hosted the first season of Flavor of Love Girls: Charm School on VH1 where she crowned Saaphyri as the winner. Mo'Nique's 2007 documentary I Coulda Been Your Cellmate! focuses on incarcerated women. In interviews with individual women, she touches on the common factors that bring many women into the penal system. The documentary was related to her filming a comedy special at the Ohio Reformatory for Women, also known as The Farm. In 2007, she had a guest-starring role on the hit television series Ugly Betty as L'Amanda, Mode's weekend security guard. She starred in The Mo'Nique Show, her own late-night talk show. Taped in Atlanta, the show premiered October 5, 2009, on BET.

She was featured in soul singer Anthony Hamilton's video "Sista Big Bones", the second single from his album Ain't Nobody Worryin'. She hosted the 2003 and 2004 BET Awards and appeared as the host again for the 2007 BET Awards. She received positive responses in July 2004 with her opening performance of Beyoncé's single "Crazy in Love" In 2007, she performed Beyoncé's "Déjà Vu". Mo'Nique has had a number of supporting roles in film. She appeared in the 2008 comedy film, Welcome Home Roscoe Jenkins with Martin Lawrence. She has had roles in Beerfest, 3 Strikes, Two Can Play That Game, Half Past Dead, and Soul Plane. She voiced a character in Garfield: The Movie, but her role was cut from the movie.

In 2008, Mo'Nique stated on Oprah Winfrey Show that Martin Lawrence gave her invaluable advice about show business: "He pulled me to the side and he said, 'Listen, don't ever let them tell you what you can't have.' Since that day, I've made some of the best deals I've ever made in my career because it keeps ringing in my head...It will stay with me forever." In 2008, Radio One signed her to her own radio show: Mo'Nique in the Afternoon (or The Mo'Nique Show), which premiered on several Radio One-owned Urban Adult Contemporary-formatted R&B/soul radio stations in July 2008. It mainly aired on these stations that had a local lineup because some Radio One stations did not carry it due to their contracts with Michael Baisden. The show lasted until March 18, 2009, when Mo'Nique decided to leave to "further her career in television, film, and comedy."

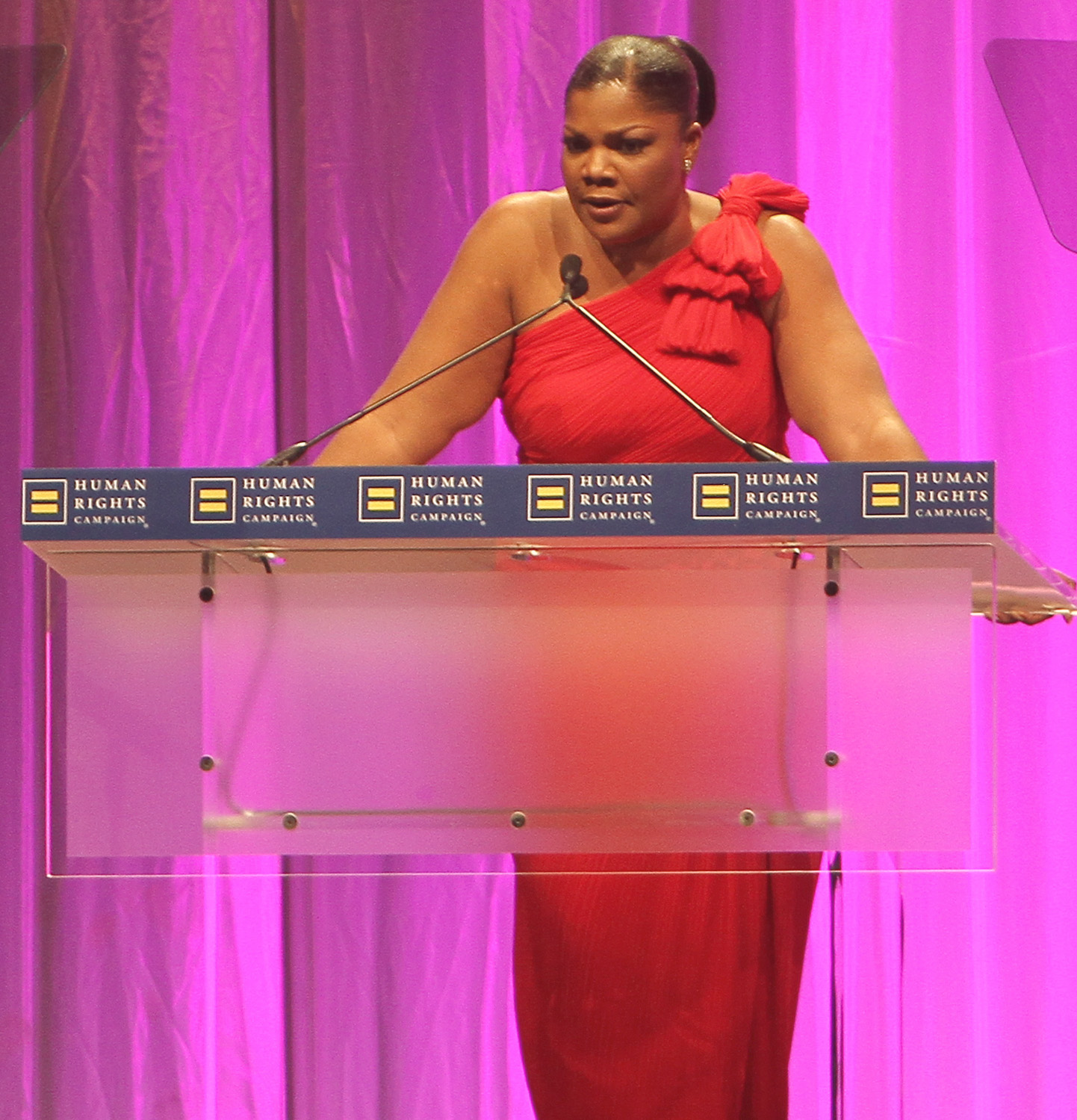
Mo'Nique giving a speech in 2010

In 2009, Mo'Nique appeared in the film Precious, directed by Lee Daniels, portraying an inner-city teenager's abusive mother. Her performance garnered her the Academy Award for Best Supporting Actress, the Independent Spirit Award, and the BAFTA Award, as well as the Sundance Film Festival Special Jury Prize, the African-American Film Critics Association's (AAFCA) first ever unanimous vote in an acting category and recognition from Time magazine, who ranked her performance as the Best Female Performance of 2009.

In November 2009, Mo'Nique said, "I own the rights to Hattie McDaniel's life story, and I can't wait to tell that story because that woman was absolutely amazing. She had to stand up to the adversity of black and white [society] at a time when we really weren't accepted. Mr. Lee Daniels is going to direct it, of course, and I'm going to be Miss Hattie McDaniel. I really hope I can do that woman justice."

In 2014, Mo'Nique starred in Patrik-Ian Polk's drama film Blackbird as Claire Rousseau. She next starred as Ma Rainey in the biographical film Bessie in 2015, for which she received critical acclaim, earning her a Primetime Emmy Award nomination. In May 2017, she said Lee Daniels, Oprah Winfrey, and Tyler Perry had been blackballing her ever since she did not promote Precious in 2009.

In 2022, it was announced that Mo'Nique was to star in the Lee Daniels' horror/thriller The Deliverance with Andra Day, Aunjanue Ellis-Taylor, Omar Epps, Miss Lawrence, and Tasha Smith.

== Personal life ==
Mo'Nique was married to sportswriter Calvin Watkins whom she met in broadcasting school and had son Shalon Watkins, Jr. in 1990. She would later describe this marriage as abusive. From 1997 to 2001, she was married to barber Mark Jackson. In October 2005, Mo'Nique gave birth to twin sons Jonathan and David Hicks two months before their due date. In 2006, she married their father, Sidney Hicks. Mo'Nique first disclosed that she and Hicks have an open marriage in a New York Times profile, saying, "If sex happens with another person, that's not a deal breaker for us, that's not something where we'll have to say, 'Oh God, we've got to go to divorce court because you cheated on me.' Because we don't cheat." She clarified their agreement on The Oprah Winfrey Show, explaining:

When I said I had an open marriage, people automatically jumped to sex. They automatically went there. But I've been best friends with my husband since we were 14 years old. When we say open, we're very honest. There are no secrets. Oftentimes you have people that are married, but they're strangers, and we refuse to be those people.

In her Netflix special My Name is Mo'Nique, released in April 2023, Mo'Nique disclosed that she experienced sexual attraction to women, stating that she was "not all the way" a lesbian, but that "when you're born with that, there's absolutely nothing you can do about it. Nothing. And please understand that I tried."

== Controversies ==
=== Blackball ===
In 2009, Mo'Nique starred in the indie drama Precious directed by Lee Daniels. For the role, she was paid $50,000. After the film started to receive critical attention and awards buzz for her performance, executive producers of the film Tyler Perry and Oprah Winfrey, as well as the film's production company Lionsgate, asked Mo'Nique to travel overseas to promote the film at the Cannes Film Festival, which she declined to do, explaining that her deal was with the film's director Lee Daniels, and that she had finished her contractual obligations.

After the campaign refusal, Mo'Nique's film and television output decreased immensely, something she attributes to Daniels, Perry, and Winfrey. According to Mo'Nique, Daniels had offered her the lead role in his 2013 film The Butler; however, Winfrey would later approach Daniels to request the role, which she was ultimately given. Mo'Nique had originally been offered the role of Cookie Lyon, on the Lee Daniels-produced drama series, Empire, in 2015; however, the offer was rescinded after a claim emerged that Mo'Nique was "too difficult to work with." When Daniels announced he would be directing a Richard Pryor biopic, he offered Mo'Nique the role of Pryor's grandmother, Daniels would yet again be approached by Winfrey, who requested the role of the grandmother, which she was later confirmed to portray; nonetheless, the biopic never went into production.

In a 2015 interview with The Hollywood Reporter, Mo'Nique said that she had received a phone call from Daniels who proclaimed that she had been blackballed for "not playing the game."

In a 2018 appearance on The View, Mo'Nique asserted:

What Tyler Perry showed me, Lee Daniels, Oprah Winfrey and Lionsgate [is] 'When you don't do what we ask you to do, we'll take your livelihood.' So for eight years, my family has suffered and my career has suffered because I would not allow those entities to bully me. And because I did not allow the bullying to happen, this is now what I sit in.

Daniels would issue Mo'Nique a public apology on stage at her comedy show in 2022, saying, "I am so sorry for hurting you in any way that I did."

In a February 2024 appearance on Shannon Sharpe's podcast Club Shay Shay, Mo'Nique proclaimed that in a recorded phone call conversation with Tyler Perry, Perry admitted to "violating" and "mistreating" her; Sharpe, who had previously been sent the audio, corroborated her claim.

=== Feud with Oprah Winfrey ===
In 2010, Mo'Nique was called by Oprah Winfrey, who told her that she had been approached by Mo'Nique's eldest brother Gerald, asking to appear on Winfrey's talk show to apologize to Mo'Nique for molesting her as a child. Mo'Nique declined to partake, but approved his sole appearance. Upon the show's airing, and unbeknownst to Mo'Nique, Winfrey had invited Mo'Nique's mother, father, and brother Steven to accompany Gerald, which Mo'Nique had not consented to, and said she would not have consented to.

In a 2020 standup comedy segment, Mo'Nique referenced her feud with Winfrey, stating how devastated she was by Oprah's communication and described her as "malicious"; citing both roles in Daniels' projects Winfrey requested after Mo'Nique already accepted the offered roles first.

=== 2019 Netflix lawsuit ===
In 2018, Mo'Nique accused Netflix of racial and gender bias against her after she was paid $500,000 for her comedy special to air on the streaming service. She compared herself to Dave Chappelle, Chris Rock, Kevin Hart, and Amy Schumer, who each received multimillion-dollar deals. In her statement, she stated:

When we asked Netflix to explain the difference—why the money was so different—they said, 'Well, we believe that's what Mo'Nique will bring.' We said, 'Well, what about my resume?' They said, 'We don't go off of resumes.' Then we asked them, 'What was it about Amy Schumer?' and they said, 'Well, she sold out Madison Square Garden twice and she had a big movie over the summer.' Is that not Amy Schumer's resume? And then Netflix said, 'By the way, we believe Mo'Nique is a legend, too.' Why shouldn't I get what the legends are getting?

In her statement, she also urged people to support her in her boycott of Netflix. She went on numerous talk shows, including The View, in which she continued to fight against Netflix. In 2019, she sued Netflix, with her complaint reading in part, "In short, as this lawsuit shows, Netflix's treatment of Mo'Nique began with a discriminatory low-ball offer and ended with a blacklisting act of retaliation." In the suit, she listed fellow comedians who were paid millions for their specials, including Chappelle, Rock, Jerry Seinfeld, Eddie Murphy, Ellen DeGeneres, and Ricky Gervais.

By June 2022, Netflix had settled the lawsuit with Mo'Nique, and on July 19, 2022, announced that she was set to do a new special for them.

== Awards and nominations ==
Mo'nique is the recipient of numerous accolades, most notably, for her performance in Precious, winning a total of 52 awards out of 66 nominations; in particular, the Academy Award for Best Supporting Actress, BAFTA Award for Best Actress in a Supporting Role, and, the Golden Globe Award for Best Supporting Actress – Motion Picture.

For her performance in The Parkers, Mo'Nique has received four NAACP Image Awards in the category of Most Outstanding Actress in a Comedy Series. She has also been nominated for several roles, including, a Primetime Emmy Award for her work in the television film, Bessie, and a number of BET Awards for her contribution to comedy productions.

== Filmography ==
=== Film ===
Year	Title	Role	Notes
2000	3 Strikes	Dahlia	
2001	The Queens of Comedy	Herself	
2001	Baby Boy	Patrice	
2001	Two Can Play That Game	Diedre	
2002	Half Past Dead	Twitch's Girl	
2004	Soul Plane	Jamiqua	
2004	Hair Show	Peaches	
2004	Garfield: The Movie	Rat	Role deleted in final cut of the film
2005	Shadowboxer	Precious	
2005	Domino	Lateesha Rodriquez	
2006	Farce of the Penguins	Vicky (voice)	
2006	Irish Jam	Psycho	
2006	Phat Girlz	Jazmin Biltmore	
2006	Beerfest	Cherry	
2008	Welcome Home, Roscoe Jenkins	Betty	
2009	Steppin: The Movie	Aunt Carla	
2009	Precious	Mary Lee Johnston	Academy Award for Best Supporting Actress
2014	Blackbird	Claire Rousseau	
2016	Interwoven	Barbara	
2016	Almost Christmas	Aunt May	
2023	The Reading	Emma Leeden	Also executive producer
2024	The Deliverance	Cynthia Henry	

=== Television ===
Year	Title	Role	Notes
1995	Snaps	Herself	Episode 1.1
1999–2000	Moesha	Nicole "Nikki" Parker	Recurring role; 3 episodes (Seasons 4 & 6)
1999–2004	The Parkers	Nicole "Nikki" Parker	Lead role; 110 episodes
2001	The Hughleys	Nicole "Nikki" Parker	Episode: "Forty Acres and a Fool"
2002	The Proud Family	Boonnetta Proud (voice)	Episode: "Behind Family Lines"
2003	Good Fences	Ruth Crisp	Television film
2004	The Bernie Mac Show	Lynette	Episode: "Who's That Lady?"
2005	Girlfriends	Herself	Episode: "See J-Spot Run"
2005–2007	Mo'Nique's Fat Chance	Host / Herself	Also executive producer
2006	Rugrats	Aunt Moo (voice)	Direct-to-DVD episode "Tales from the Crib: Three Jacks and a Beanstalk"
2006	Nip/Tuck	Evetta Washington	Episode: "Conor McNamara"
2007	Flavor of Love Girls: Charm School	Herself	Host; 11 episodes (also producer)
2007	The Game	Plus Size Actress / Host	Episode: "Diary of a Mad Black Woman, Redux"
2007	The Boondocks	Jamiqua (voice)	Episode: "…Or Die Trying"
2007	Ugly Betty	L'Amanda	Episode: "I See Me, I.C.U."
2009–2011	The Mo'Nique Show	Herself	Host; 251 episodes (also executive producer)
2014	Love & Hip Hop: New York	Herself	Host of Season 4 (2 episodes – Reunion Special)
2015	Bessie	Ma Rainey	Television film
2023	Black Mafia Family	Goldie	Recurring role; 3 episodes (season 2)

=== Specials ===
Year	Title	Role	Notes
2005	Mo'Nique: One Night Stand	Herself	
2007	Mo'Nique: I Could Have Been Your Cellmate	Herself	Showtime
2020	Mo'Nique & Friends: Live from Atlanta	Herself	Showtime
2023	My Name is Mo'Nique	Herself	Netflix

== Tours ==
=== Residency show ===
- Mo'Nique Does Vegas (held at SLS Las Vegas) (2019)
