= Hank Rieger =

American publicist and journalist

- Born: Henry Rieger, Jr. September 20, 1918; Kansas City, Missouri, United States
- Died: March 5, 2014 (aged 95); Oceanside, California, United States
- Occupation: Television publicist
- Known for: ATAS President (1973–1975, 1977–1980)
- Spouse: Deborah Hays (m. 1947–2013; her death)

Henry Rieger, Jr. (September 20, 1918 – March 5, 2014) was an American publicist and journalist. He was also a two-time president of the Academy of Television Arts & Sciences (ATAS).

== Early years ==
Rieger was born in Kansas City, Missouri, while his parents visited family, and raised in Phoenix, Arizona. He became fascinated with journalism as a young boy, when he attended a golf tournament with his sportswriter uncle. He studied English and journalism at Phoenix College and the University of Arizona. He also took courses at USC, where he later became an adjunct faculty member in the School of Journalism.

== World War II and the United Press ==
While at the University of Arizona, Rieger began writing for the United Press (UP). He was drafted into the United States Army for the Pacific Ocean theater of World War II, where his writing skills made him company clerk. After the war, he was based at various U.S. bases, assigned to intelligence and counter-intelligence. He left military service as a Major. He returned to his 20-year career as a journalist with the UP bureau in Los Angeles, only taking a year off in 1953 to serve as press agent for the U.S. consul general in Singapore.

== NBC and the Television Academy ==
From 1965 to 1979, Rieger was the West Coast director of press and publicity for NBC Television and promoted popular shows of the time, such as Bonanza, I Spy, Star Trek, Laugh-In, Sanford and Son and The Tonight Show Starring Johnny Carson. Rieger served as ATAS's Hollywood president from 1973 to 1975 and as Television Academy president from 1977 to 1980, during which he created the Emmy Magazine for the Academy and helped the Primetime Emmy Award ceremonies become a television stalwart.

He left NBC in 1979 to start his own public relations firm and had clients such as the relatively new television network ESPN, retaining them until his death in 2014. He was also vice-president of the Special Olympics in California and was part of the organizing committee that sought to bring the 1984 Summer Olympics to Los Angeles. In 1994, he was given the Television Academy's Syd Cassyd Award for his long and distinguished service.

== Personal life and death ==
Rieger met Deborah Hays in Phoenix, while he attended college there. They married on October 5, 1947, and she followed him wherever his career took him, although she preferred the West Coast of the U.S. She died at age 92 on April 8, 2013, from heart and kidney problems. At age 95, he died in March 2014 of natural causes at an assisted living facility in Oceanside, California.
