= Flix Premiere =

- Country: United Kingdom
- Introduced: 2015
- Markets: UK and US
- Website: www.flixpremiere.com

Flix Premiere is a British media-services provider founded in 2015 by Martin Warner. The company's primary business is its subscription-based streaming OTT service, which offers online streaming of films, including some produced in-house. Two months after its UK opening, it premiered in the United States. The Guardian described the site as a supermarket for indie cinema, noting that it were few familiar titles available on the site, but that those available were the "best of the bunch" from film festivals and not available on other platforms.

== Devices ==
The service is part of a pool of streaming services including Netflix and Amazon. It is available through its website, Apple TV and mobile applications.
