= Abby Singer =

American television director (1917–2014)

- Born: December 8, 1917; United States
- Died: March 13, 2014 (aged 96); United States
- Occupations: Production manager, assistant director

Abner E. "Abby" Singer (December 8, 1917 – March 13, 2014) was an American production manager and assistant director in film between the 1950s and the 1980s. His name has become synonymous in Hollywood with the second-to-last shot of a production day; this shot is known throughout the industry as the "Abby Singer".

According to Burt Bluestein of the Directors Guild of America, "It all began when Abby was a 1st AD and people on the crew would ask him how many shots were left to do before lunch. Abby would answer, 'We'll do this and one more.' At the end of the day, when they asked what was to be done before the wrap, Abby would say, 'This and one more, then we're out of here.'"

Singer himself explained that he had a very specific reason for calling out the second to last shot; "In television, we would make maybe five or six moves during the day — going from one set to another, or from one stage to another. Or we'd move from the back lot to a stage. I would say, 'Fellas, we'll do this [shot] and one more and then we're moving.' This would give the crew a chance to begin wrapping up their equipment or to call transportation for gurneys, so they'd be ready to get out quickly... I did it really to save time for the director. If we did it during the day, I could save 10 to 15 minutes each time we had to move. I could give the director another hour a day of shooting."

While the second-to-last shot of the day is called the "Abby Singer," the final shot of the production day is referred to as a "Martini Shot," referring to a well-earned cocktail at the end of a hard day.

Abby Singer died of cancer on March 13, 2014, in California at the age of 96.

== Selected filmography ==
=== As assistant director ===
- Death of a Salesman (1951) (Second AD)
- Income Tax Sappy (1954) (as Abner Singer)
- Shot in the Frontier (1954) (as Abner E. Singer)
- The Jack Benny Show (1958) (as Abner E. Singer)
- 7th Cavalry (1956) (as Abner E. Singer)
- The Guns of Fort Petticoat (1957) (as Abner E. Singer)
- M Squad (1957) TV Series (assistant director)
- Hellcats of the Navy (1957) (assistant director)
- The Guns of Fort Petticoat (1957) (assistant director)
- 7th Cavalry (1956) (assistant director)
- He Laughed Last (1956) (assistant director)
- Over-Exposed (1956) (assistant director)
- A Lawless Street (1955) [a.k.a. Marshal of Medicine Bend (USA)] (assistant director)
- Gypped in the Penthouse (1955) (assistant director)
- Cannibal Attack (1954) (assistant director)
- Shot in the Frontier (1954) (assistant director)
- Massacre Canyon (1954) (assistant director)
- Income Tax Sappy (1954) (assistant director)

=== As production manager ===
- Columbo: Sex and the Married Detective (1989) (TV) (unit production manager)
- Columbo: Murder, Smoke and Shadows (1989) (TV) (unit production manager)
- Columbo: Columbo Goes to the Guillotine (1989) (TV) (unit production manager)
- Thunderbolt and Lightfoot (1974) (unit production manager)
- Remington Steele TV series
  - "Signed, Steeled & Delivered" TV Episode (executive in charge of production)
  - "Your Steele the One for Me" TV Episode (executive in charge of production)
  - "Sting of Steele" (1983) TV Episode (executive in charge of production)
  - "Steele's Gold" (1983) TV Episode (executive in charge of production)
  - "Vintage Steele" (1983) TV Episode (executive in charge of production)
  - "Steele in the News" (1983) TV Episode (executive in charge of production)
  - "Steele Among the Living" (1983) TV Episode (executive in charge of production)
- The Bob Newhart Show (production manager)
- WKRP in Cincinnati (1978–1982) (executive in charge of production)
- Hill Street Blues (1981–1987) (executive in charge of production)
- St. Elsewhere (1982–1988) (executive in charge of production)
- A Little Sex (1982) (production manager: Los Angeles)
- First, You Cry (1978) (TV) (supervising production manager)
- Something for Joey (1977) (TV) (production manager)
- The Mary Tyler Moore Show (1974–1976) (unit production manager 1974–1975; production manager 1975–1976)
- "Rhoda" (1974) TV Series (unit production manager)
- Istanbul Express (1968) (TV) (unit manager)
- The Doris Day Show (1968) TV Series (production manager)
- The Meanest Men in the West (1967) (TV) (unit production manager)
- Out of Sight (1966) (unit production manager)
- Gunsmoke (1955) TV Series (production manager)
