= Joanne Borgella =

American model and singer (1982–2014)

- Born: May 29, 1982; Brooklyn, New York City
- Died: October 18, 2014 (aged 32)
- Occupations: Singer, model
- Years active: 2008–2014

Joanne Borgella (May 29, 1982 – October 18, 2014) was an American singer, plus-size model and reality television personality. She was signed to Wilhelmina Models in New York City, Miami and LA. She was the first winner of Mo'Nique's Fat Chance pageant as "Miss F.A.T." in 2005 and a top 24 contestant on the seventh season of American Idol in 2008. Borgella died October 18, 2014, due to a rare form of endometrial cancer.

== Early life ==
Borgella was born in the Brooklyn borough of New York City, to an OB-GYN father and a mother who was a registered nurse. The family moved to Uniondale, New York, when she was an infant, and later to the fellow Long Island town of Oyster Bay Cove. She had older siblings: Joel, Jean and Jerald.

== Career ==
In 2008, she auditioned for the talent search reality television show American Idol. After successfully completing "Hollywood week", she was chosen to be one of the top 12 girls and overall top 24 final contestants for the seventh season. Her musical influences were Whitney Houston, Celine Dion, Barbra Streisand, Alanis Morissette and Andrea Bocelli. Borgella was eliminated on February 21, 2008, along with Colton Berry, Garrett Haley and Amy Davis.

She was "Miss F.A.T." 2005, and the first season winner of Mo'Nique's Fat Chance. Borgella was represented by Wilhelmina Models 10/20 division in New York and Miami. She had been the face of Torrid, Ashley Stewart, Wal-Mart and Kohls department store and appeared advertisements featured in Seventeen, Essence and InStyle, among others. She was also one of the faces of Procter & Gamble a new campaign that many are calling a "movement" directed at the African American woman, "My Black is Beautiful".

Borgella appeared as a coach on MTV's Made in 2011. In 2013 Borgella joined the cast of NUVOtv's show Curvy Girls.

She had been a resident of Hoboken, New Jersey.

== Illness and death ==
In October 2013, Borgella posted a video stating she had been diagnosed with cancer. She said she was suffering from severe headaches and, upon going to the emergency room to determine the cause of those headaches, discovered that cancer had spread to her brain. Borgella died early on October 18, 2014, at age 32.

== American Idol performances ==
Week #	Theme	Song Choice	Original Artist	Order #	Result
Top 24 (12 Women)	1960s	"I Say a Little Prayer"	Dionne Warwick	2	Eliminated
