= Mo'Nique's Fat Chance =

US television program

- Genre: Reality TV beauty pageant
- Created by: Mo'Nique
- Starring: Mo'Nique; Velvet D'Amour; Mikki Taylor; Sylvie Fabregon
- Country of origin: United States
- Original language: English
- No. of seasons: 3

Original release
- Network: Oxygen
- Release: 2005 – 2007

Mo'Nique's Fat Chance is a reality TV miniseries. It featured 10 plus-sized women competing in a beauty pageant to become "Miss F.A.T.", which is explained as "Fabulous and Thick". It was hosted by actress Mo'Nique and aired from 2005 to 2007 on the Oxygen network.

During its first season, Mo'Nique's Fat Chance had the strongest ratings for an original show in the history of Oxygen.

== 2005 edition ==
The first season premiered August 6, 2005, on Oxygen.

Among the prizes were: a participate in a professional photo shoot, be featured in a Just My Size catalog, win a closet filled with the latest Just My Size Fashions and a week long boot camp designed to showcase inner and outer beauty.

The winner of the 2005 edition of Mo'Nique's Fat Chance was the late Joanne Borgella, who was subsequently a semi-finalist on season 7 of American Idol. The judges were Kevin Lennox, Shaquille O'Neal and Mia Tyler.

Contestant	Age
Alicia Mitchell	21
Chelsea Burrell	24
Danielle "Charlie" Bye	25
Janis A Edralin	28
Jessica Jerez	24
Joanne Borgella†	23
Krystal Morris	24
Monique Manning	26
Tiffany Hall	21
Sharon Quinn	44

== 2006 edition ==
The 2006 winner of the competition was Tanisha Malone.

=== Contestants ===
- Evie Marsala
- Frances Galvan
- Gia Gigliette
- Janelle Gilbert
- Kahlia Johnson
- Sara Barrios
- Shawnti Eaden
- Tanisha Malone
- Tiffany Jones
- Victoria Mao

== 2007 edition ==
The third season took place in Paris, France, and premiered July 28, 2007, on Oxygen with 10 episodes. The season's judges were Velvet D'Amour, Mikki Taylor and Sylvie Fabregon.

Contestant	Age	Hometown
Anabelle Ursulet	22	Paris, France
Arena Turner	23	Miami, Florida
Arlette Preira	24	Loire Valley, France
Chrystelle Zig	24	12th arrondissement of Paris, France
Jennifer Diluigi	27	Northridge, California
Johanna Dray		Paris, France
Marcia Tarver	31	Dallas, Texas
Ngozi Smith	37	Park Forest, Illinois
Ruth Cartagena	24	Chicago, Illinois
Véronique Severe		Paris, France
