= 2026 United States Senate election in New Jersey =

- November 3, 2026
- Turnout: 44.27%(▼27.73pp)
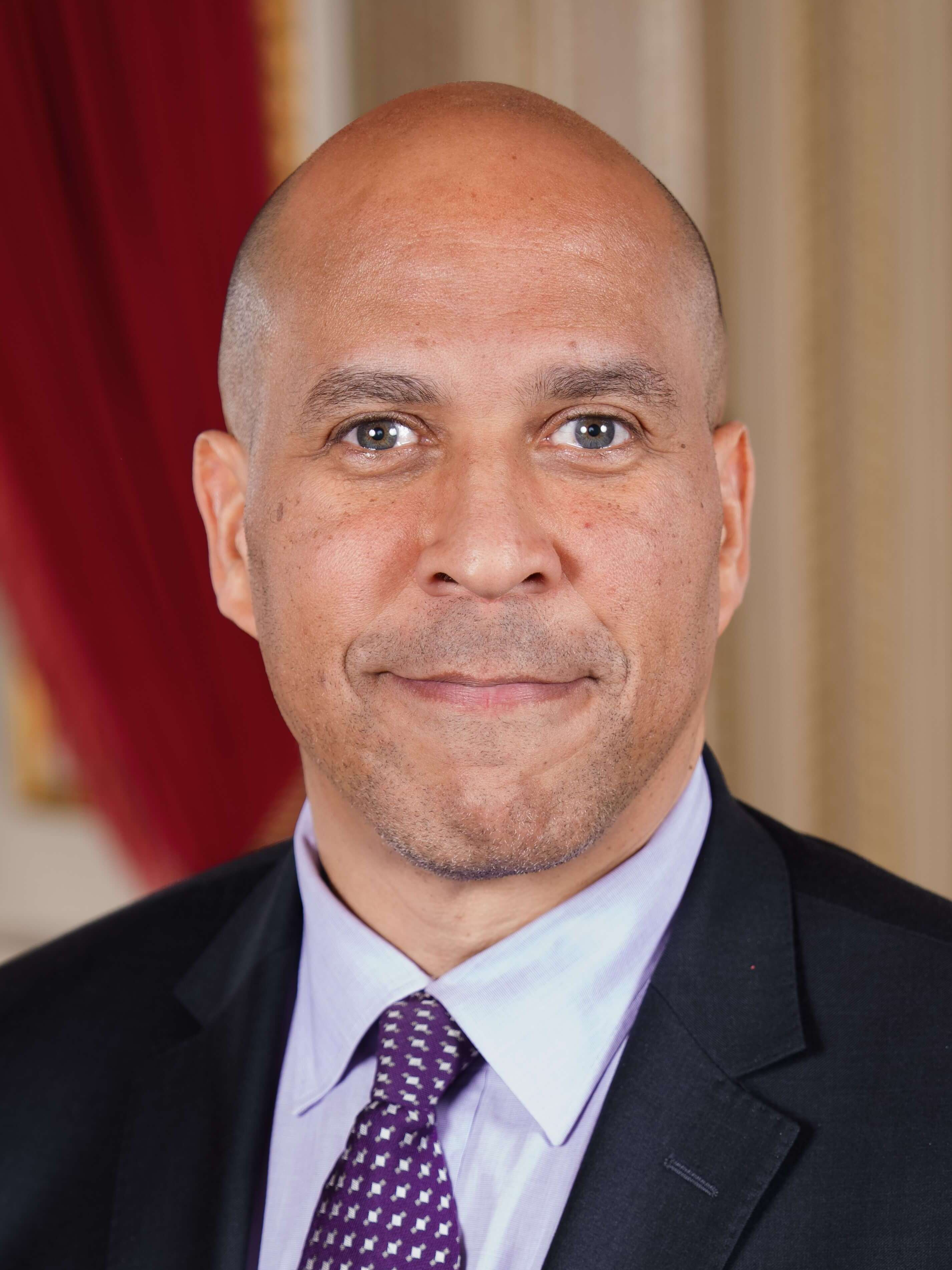

| Nominee | Cory Booker | Justin Murphy |
| Party | Democratic | Republican |
| Popular vote | 1,862,747 | 1,035,906 |
| Percentage | 62.58% | 34.80% |
- Booker: 50–60% 60–70% 70–80% 80–90% Murphy: 40–50% 50–60%
U.S. senator before election
Cory Booker
Democratic
Elected U.S. senator
Cory Booker
Democratic

The 2026 United States Senate election in New Jersey was held on November 3, 2026 in concurrence with elections to the House of Representatives as part of the 2026 United States elections to elect a member of the United States Senate to represent the state of New Jersey. Democratic incumbent Cory Booker was re-elected to a third full term, defeating Republican former Tabernacle deputy mayor Justin Murphy.

Primary elections were held on June 2. Booker ran unopposed for the Democratic nomination. In the Republican primary, Murphy won the nomination with 33.3% of the vote over state trooper Richard Tabor and journalist Alex Zdan.

Booker defeated Murphy by a margin of 27.8%, marking the strongest performance of his senatorial career and the best performance for a statewide Democrat in a Senate race since 1984. He also won two reliably Republican counties, Hunterdon and Monmouth, making him the first Democrat to win them since the 1984 Senate election and the 2001 gubernatorial election, respectively. Monmouth County last voted Democratic for Senate in 1988. In Presidential races, Monmouth has not voted Democratic since it was won by Al Gore in 2000. Hunterdon, however, has not voted for a Democratic Presidential nominee since Lyndon B. Johnson swept all of New Jersey's counties in his 1964 landslide win.

== Democratic primary ==
=== Candidates ===
==== Nominee ====
- Cory Booker, incumbent U.S. senator (2013–present)

==== Withdrawn ====
- Saxon Callahan
- Chris Fields, community organizer
- Alex Hammerli, podcaster and actor
- Lisa McCormick, activist and perennial candidate

=== Endorsements ===
Cory Booker

Statewide officials

- Mikie Sherrill, governor of New Jersey (2026–present)

Political parties

- 15 Democratic county committees (Note: Atlantic County Democratic Organization; Bergen County Democratic Organization; Burlington County Democratic Organization; Cape May Democratic Organization; Essex County Democratic Organization; Hunterdon County Democratic Organization; Middlesex County Democratic Organization; Monmouth County Democratic Organization; Morris County Democratic Organization; Ocean County Democratic Organization; Passaic County Democratic Organization; Salem County Democratic Organization; Sussex County Democratic Organization; Union County Democratic Organization; Warren County Democratic Organization)
- Piscataway Democratic Organization

Labor unions

- SEIU New Jersey State Council

Organizations

- AAPI Victory Fund
- AIPAC
- Feminist Majority PAC
- Giffords
- Humane World Action Fund
- Jewish Democratic Council of America
- Joint Action Committee for Political Affairs
- League of Conservation Voters
- Natural Resources Defense Council Action Fund
- Planned Parenthood Action Fund
- Population Connection
- Sierra Club
- The Collective PAC

==== County convention results ====
County convention results

Hunterdon County Democratic Convention
| Party | Candidate | Votes | % |
|---|---|---|---|
| Democratic | Cory Booker (incumbent) | 146 | 79.3% |
| Democratic | Chris Fields | 30 | 16.3% |
| Democratic | Lisa McCormick | 8 | 4.3% |
| Total votes | | 184 | 100.0% |

Sussex County Democratic Convention
| Party | Candidate | Votes | % |
|---|---|---|---|
| Democratic | Cory Booker (incumbent) | 132 | 82.5% |
| Democratic | Chris Fields | 28 | 17.5% |
| Total votes | | 160 | 100.0% |

=== Fundraising ===
Campaign finance reports as of March 31, 2026
| Candidate | Raised | Spent | Cash on hand |
|---|---|---|---|
| Cory Booker (D) | $31,443,196 | $15,158,732 | $22,171,570 |
Source: Federal Election Commission

=== Results ===
Democratic primary results
| Party | Candidate | Votes | % |
|---|---|---|---|
| Democratic | Cory Booker (incumbent) | 587,980 | 100.0 |
| Total votes | | 587,980 | 100.0 |

== Republican primary ==
=== Candidates ===
==== Nominee ====
- Justin Murphy, former Deputy Mayor of Tabernacle Township and perennial candidate

==== Eliminated in primary ====
- Robert Lebovics, physician and nominee for New Jersey's 37th senate district in 2005 and 2011
- Richard Tabor, New Jersey state trooper and candidate for New Jersey's 20th assembly district in 2025
- Alex Zdan, former News 12 reporter and candidate for U.S. Senate in 2024

==== Withdrawn ====
- Natalie Rivera, activist and independent candidate for U.S. Senate in 2018 and Republican candidate for U.S. Senate in 2020

==== Declined ====
- Curtis Bashaw, former executive director of the Casino Reinvestment Development Authority and nominee for U.S. Senate in 2024 (running for Cape May County commissioner)
- Vinnie Brand, stand-up comedian and owner of The Stress Factory
- Edward Durr, former state senator from the 3rd district (2022–2024) and candidate for governor in 2025
- Mike Testa, state senator from the 1st district (2019–present) and Cumberland County Republican chair (2014–present) (endorsed Zdan)

=== Endorsements ===
Robert Lebovics

State legislators

- Robert Auth, AD-39 (2014–present)

Organizations

- Lakewood Township Vaad
Justin Murphy

Individuals

- Bill Spadea, radio host, and candidate in the 2025 New Jersey gubernatorial election

Political parties

- Camden County Republican Organization
- Gloucester County Republican Organization
- Mercer County Republican Organization

Organizations

- New Jersey Right to Life PAC (co-endorsement with Tabor)
Richard Tabor

Political parties

- Atlantic County Republican Organization
- Hudson County Republican Organization
- Hunterdon County Republican Organization
- Middlesex County Republican Organization
- Ocean County Republican Organization
- Somerset County Republican Organization
- Union County Republican Organization

Organizations

- New Jersey Right to Life PAC (co-endorsement with Murphy)
Alex Zdan

State legislators

- Dick LaRossa, former SD-15 (1992–1998)
- Doug Steinhardt, SD-23 (2022–present), chair of the Warren County Republican Party (2004–present)
- Mike Testa, SD-01 (2019–present) and Cumberland County Republican Party chair (2014–present)

Local officials

- Jack Ball, former mayor of Ewing Township (2007–2010)
- David Fried, former mayor of Robbinsville Township (2000–2025)
- Robert Prunetti, former Mercer County Executive (1992–2004)

Individuals

- Michel F. Hurtado, candidate for Mercer County Commissioner in 2021 and Republican candidate for the 15th District in 2023

Political parties

- Bergen County Republican Organization
- Burlington County Republican Organization
- Cape May County Republican Organization
- Cumberland County Republican Organization
- Essex County Republican Organization
- Ewing Township Republican Committee
- Passaic County Republican Organization
- Salem County Republican Organization
Declined to endorse

Political parties

- Morris County Republican Organization

=== Fundraising ===
Campaign finance reports as of May 13, 2026
| Candidate | Raised | Spent | Cash on hand |
|---|---|---|---|
| Robert Lebovics (R) | $101,260 | $77,955 | $23,304 |
| Justin Murphy (R) | $15,453 | $14,581 | $0 |
| Richard Tabor (R) | $10,615 | $3,826 | $6,788 |
| Alex Zdan (R) | $7,378 | $1,552 | $5,826 |
Source: Federal Election Commission

=== County conventions ===
County convention results

Atlantic County Republican Convention
| Party | Candidate | Votes | % |
|---|---|---|---|
| Republican | Richard Tabor | 644 | 71.8% |
| Republican | Alex Zdan | 208 | 23.2% |
| Republican | Justin Murphy | 23 | 2.6% |
| Republican | Natalie Rivera | 22 | 2.5% |
| Total votes | | 897 | 100.0% |

Hunterdon County Republican Convention
| Party | Candidate | Votes | % |
|---|---|---|---|
| Republican | Richard Tabor | 57 | 53.8% |
| Republican | Alex Zdan | 43 | 40.6% |
| Republican | Justin Murphy | 6 | 5.7% |
| Total votes | | 106 | 100.0% |

Burlington County Republican Convention
| Party | Candidate | Votes | % |
|---|---|---|---|
| Republican | Alex Zdan | 40 | 51.2% |
| Republican | Richard Tabor | 21 | 26.9% |
| Republican | Justin Murphy | 17 | 21.8% |
| Republican | Natalie Rivera | 0 | 0.0% |
| Total votes | | 78 | 100.0% |

Mercer County Republican Convention
| Party | Candidate | Votes | % |
|---|---|---|---|
| Republican | Justin Murphy | 66 | 63.5% |
| Republican | Richard Tabor | 38 | 36.5% |
| Total votes | | 104 | 100.0% |

Cumberland County Republican Convention
| Party | Candidate | Votes | % |
|---|---|---|---|
| Republican | Alex Zdan | 48 | 67.6% |
| Republican | Richard Tabor | 14 | 19.7% |
| Republican | Natalie Rivera | 6 | 8.5% |
| Republican | Justin Murphy | 3 | 4.2% |
| Total votes | | 71 | 100.0% |

Salem County Republican Convention
| Party | Candidate | Votes | % |
|---|---|---|---|
| Republican | Alex Zdan | 31 | 59.6% |
| Republican | Justin Murphy | 21 | 40.4% |
| Total votes | | 52 | 100.0% |

Bergen County Republican Convention
| Party | Candidate | Votes | % |
|---|---|---|---|
| Republican | Alex Zdan | 246 | 74.8% |
| Republican | Justin Murphy | 65 | 19.8% |
| Republican | Natalie Rivera | 18 | 5.5% |
| Total votes | | 329 | 100.0% |

Ocean County Republican Convention
| Party | Candidate | Votes | % |
|---|---|---|---|
| Republican | Richard Tabor | 167 | 88.4% |
| Republican | Justin Murphy | 17 | 9.0% |
| Republican | Alex Zdan | 5 | 2.6% |
| Total votes | | 189 | 100.0% |

Somerset County Republican Convention
| Party | Candidate | Votes | % |
|---|---|---|---|
| Republican | Richard Tabor | 65 | 57.5% |
| Republican | Alex Zdan | 38 | 33.6% |
| Republican | Robert Lebovics | 10 | 8.8% |
| Total votes | | 113 | 100.0% |

Middlesex County Republican Convention
| Party | Candidate | Votes | % |
|---|---|---|---|
| Republican | Richard Tabor | 81 | 90.0% |
| Republican | Justin Murphy | 6 | 6.7% |
| Republican | Alex Zdan | 3 | 33.3% |
| Total votes | | 90 | 100.0% |

=== Results ===

Murphy

30–40%
40–50%
50–60%
70–80%

Tabor

30–40%
40–50%
50–60%
60–70%

Zdan

30–40%
40–50%
50–60%

Murphy

20–30%
30–40%
40–50%
50–60%
60–70%
70–80%
80–90%
90–100%

Tabor

20–30%
30–40%
40–50%
50–60%
60–70%
70–80%
80–90%
90–100%

Zdan

20–30%
30–40%
40–50%
50–60%
60–70%
70–80%
80–90%
90–100%

Lebovics

20–30%
30–40%
40–50%
50–60%
60–70%
90–100%

Other

20–30% Tie
30–40% Tie
40–50% Tie
50% Tie
No Votes

Republican primary results
| Party | Candidate | Votes | % |
|---|---|---|---|
| Republican | Justin Murphy | 82,272 | 33.4 |
| Republican | Richard Tabor | 71,915 | 29.2 |
| Republican | Alex Zdan | 66,183 | 26.8 |
| Republican | Robert Lebovics | 26,280 | 10.7 |
| Total votes | | 246,650 | 100.0 |

== Third-party and independent candidates ==
=== Candidates ===
Declared

- Eduardo Castillo (write-in)
- Veronica Fernandez (End the Corruption!), perennial candidate
- Joanne Kuniansky (Socialist Workers Party), candidate for governor of New Jersey in 2025

==== Did not qualify ====
- Nicholas Carducci, software engineer and candidate for U.S. Senate in 2024
- Michael Estrada

==== Withdrawn ====
- Natalie Lynn Rivera (Together for NJ), activist and independent candidate for U.S. Senate in 2018 and Republican candidate for U.S. Senate in 2020

== General election ==
=== Predictions ===
| Source | Ranking | As of |
|---|---|---|
| The Cook Political Report | Solid D | November 2, 2026 |
| Decision Desk HQ | Safe D | November 3, 2026 |
| The Economist (Note: The Economist's prediction model uses unconventional terminology. For the purpose of equivalency, their "Very Likely" ratings are formatted as a "Likely" rating while "Likely" ratings are formatted as a "Lean" rating.) | Safe D | November 3, 2026 |
| FiftyPlusOne | Safe D | November 3, 2026 |
| Fox News | Solid D | November 1, 2026 |
| Inside Elections | Solid D | October 29, 2026 |
| MS NOW | Safe D | October 29, 2026 |
| NBC News | Solid D | November 3, 2026 |
| RealClearPolitics | Solid D | November 2, 2026 |
| Sabato's Crystal Ball | Safe D | November 2, 2026 |
| Silver Bulletin | Solid D | November 3, 2026 |
| Split Ticket | Safe D | November 2, 2026 |

=== Post-primary endorsements ===
Cory Booker (D)

Labor unions

- AFL-CIO
- National Education Association
- New Jersey State Building & Construction Trades Council
- New Jersey Teamsters

Organizations

- Lakewood Vaad
Justin Murphy (R)

State legislators

- Mike Testa, LD-01 (2019–present) and Cumberland County Republican Party chair (2014–present)

Individuals

- Richard Tabor, New Jersey state trooper and former candidate for this seat

=== Fundraising ===
Campaign finance reports as of October 14, 2026
| Candidate | Raised | Spent | Cash on hand |
|---|---|---|---|
| Cory Booker (D) | $35,910,076 | $18,897,772 | $22,899,411 |
| Justin Murphy (R) | $68,189 | $57,102 | $10,191 |
Source: Federal Election Commission

=== Debates ===
2026 United States Senate election in New Jersey debates
| No. | Date | Host | Moderators | Link | Participants | |
| P Participant A Absent N Non-invitee I Invitee W Withdrawn | | | | | | |
| P Participant A Absent N Non-invitee I Invitee W Withdrawn | | | | | Cory Booker | Justin Murphy |
|---|---|---|---|---|---|---|
| 1 | October 8, 2026 | New Jersey Globe/Rider University | David Wildstein and Micah Rasmussen | New Jersey Globe | P | P |

=== Results ===
2026 United States Senate election in New Jersey
| Party | Candidate | Votes | % | ±% |
|---|---|---|---|---|
| Democratic | Cory Booker (incumbent) | 1,862,747 | 62.58 | |
| Republican | Justin Murphy | 1,035,906 | 34.80 | |
| End the Corruption! | Veronica Fernandez | 49,818 | 1.67 | |
| Socialist Workers | Joanne Kuniansky | 28,290 | 0.95 | |
| Write-in | Eduardo Castillo | 89 | 0.00 | |
| Total votes | | 2,976,761 | 100.0 | |

==== Counties that flipped from Republican to Democratic ====
- Hunterdon (largest municipality: Raritan Township)
- Monmouth (largest municipality: Middletown)

==== By congressional district ====
Booker won eleven congressional districts, while Murphy won one.

| District | Booker | Murphy | Elected Representative |
|---|---|---|---|
| 1st | 68.42% | 29.36% | Donald Norcross |
| 2nd | 51.38% | 46.62% | Zack Mullock |
| 3rd | 62.79% | 35.08% | Herb Conaway |
| 4th | 46.78% | 51.20% | Chris Smith |
| 5th | 58.66% | 38.81% | Josh Gottheimer |
| 6th | 65.01% | 31.72% | Frank Pallone |
| 7th | 56.37% | 41.03% | Rebecca Bennett |
| 8th | 77.89% | 17.17% | Rob Menendez |
| 9th | 64.20% | 32.09% | Nellie Pou |
| 10th | 82.59% | 14.11% | LaMonica McIver |
| 11th | 61.97% | 35.38% | Analilia Mejia |
| 12th | 70.19% | 26.42% | Adam Hamawy |
