= Demented World =

Studio album by Gregg Hughes and Anthony Cumia (Opie and Anthony)
- Released: October 1997
- Genre: Comedy
- Label: Restaurant (1004-2)
- Producer: Chuck Davis

Opie & Anthony's Demented World is a compilation album by American radio personalities Gregg "Opie" Hughes and Anthony Cumia, released in October 1997 on Restaurant Records. It features live and pre-recorded segments from their radio show Opie and Anthony when it aired in afternoons on WAAF-FM in Boston, Massachusetts from 1995 to 1998.

== Release ==
The album was released on Restaurant Records, an independent label based in New Jersey. By December 1997, the album had sold over 20,000 copies regionally and saw a national release. It went to No. 21 on Soundscan's CD sales chart for the Boston area. It went to No. 47 on Billboard's Heatseeker Album Chart. To promote the radio show and album, a three-track promotional edition was distributed to 850 radio stations nationwide.

A portion of sales from the album was donated to the Veterans Benefits Clearing House in Boston to help minority homeless veterans and the New England Shelter for Homeless Veterans. By December 1997, over $17,000 had been raised.

Hughes and Cumia had started work on a follow-up album tentatively named Cringe, but it was never released. They later said that they received no money from Demented World.

== Tracks ==
1. 100 Grand (1:25)
2. Hi Mom, I'm in Jail (3:40)
3. Testicular Video (1:30)
4. Accordian [sic] (2:51)
5. Green People (2:47)
6. Dr. Smith (2:23)
7. Butt Plug (1:42)
8. Evil Barney Babysits (2:51)
9. Girl's Bike (1:48)
10. Brando & Underdog (0:58)
11. Publishers Clearing House (2:13)
12. Hi Mom, I'm in Porno (2:49)
13. My Dog Fresca (1:53)
14. Scrotum (1:07)
15. Reagan (3:23)
16. Hey Masterbator (1:46)
17. Emphysema Call (3:05)
18. Raquel Welch (0:40)
19. Captain Kirk (1:25)
20. Green Bay Funeral (2:49)
21. Babe's Auto Villa (0:43)
22. Breasts (1:57)
23. Crazy Jim (0:20)
24. Tourettes Whorehouse (2:54)
25. Fake-O (0:36)
26. Freezer (2:04)
27. Granny Christmas Song (2:06)
28. Wheelchair Fred Butt Plug (1:34)

== Production ==
- Executive Producer — Dave Douglas
- Producer — Chuck Davis
- Mastering — Henk Kooistra
- Photography — Malcolm Hewitt
