= Opie and Anthony's Traveling Virus Comedy Tour =

Stand-up comedy tour

Opie and Anthony's Traveling Virus
- Stand-up comedy tour by Opie and Anthony
- Start date: August 5, 2006
- End date: September 2, 2008
- Legs: 3
- No. of shows: 13

Opie and Anthony's Traveling Virus was a stand-up comedy tour hosted by American radio personalities Gregg "Opie" Hughes and Anthony Cumia that featured a roster of comedians from their radio show, Opie and Anthony. There were three editions of the tour between 2006 and 2008; the first consisted of 4 dates, the second had 8 dates, and the third consisted of a single show.

== History ==
By 2006, Hughes and Cumia, plus comedian Jim Norton on third mic, had been hosting Opie and Anthony on the uncensored subscription-based satellite radio service XM for over a year, from New York City. In April 2006, following the cancellation of The David Lee Roth Show, the pair signed a deal with CBS Radio to simulcast the first half of the show on several of its terrestrial radio stations. Their deal with CBS allowed them to receive the green-light for the tour, ideas for which took shape in the following weeks and artist representative Peter Pappalardo was hired as the tour's organiser. Hughes and Cumia originally envisaged a package comedy tour with several comedians that were regular guests on the radio show, plus theatrical elements. Pappalardo tried to incorporate as many suggestions that the hosts and local promoters had come up with, and sold the tour as "an anything goes type of atmosphere" while adhering to local laws. Each stop on the tour featured the O&A Village, a series of exhibits and attractions including women giving back rubs while dressed in nurse outfits, booths designed by fans of the show, and a "petting zoo" featuring show regulars such as Twitchels and Stalker Patty. The Boston Globe described the tour as "a moving festival more comparable to Lollapalooza or Ozzfest than a typical stand-up event."

== Tours ==
=== 2006 ===
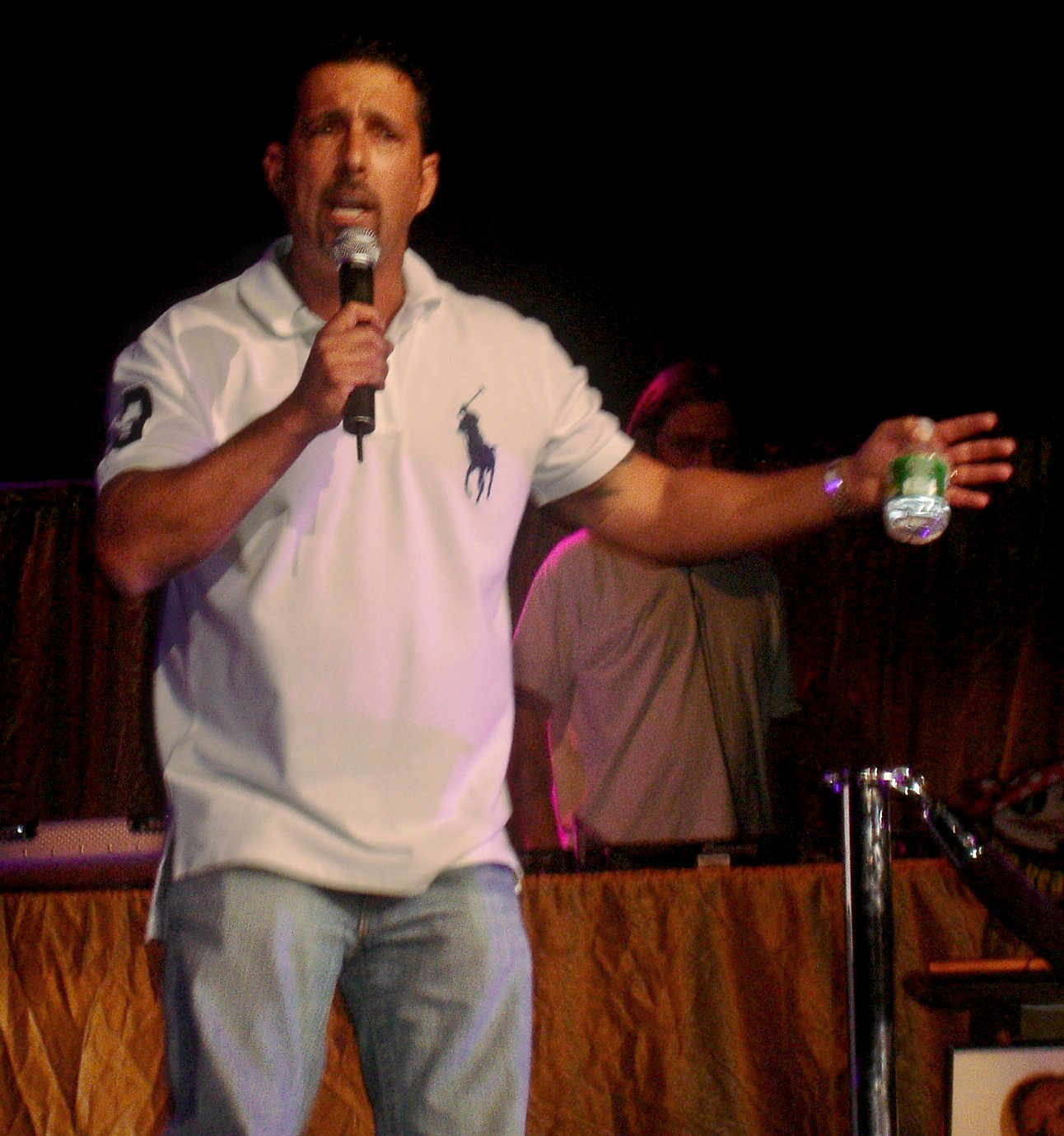
Rich Vos performing at the 2006 tour

The first tour ran for four dates in August and September 2006, and was self-billed as The Comedy Event of 2006.

=== 2007 ===
The 2007 tour kicked off with one show in Las Vegas, Nevada on April 14. An additional seven shows were announced for the summer, which started on June 16.

=== 2008 ===
In 2008, plans to stage a full tour were cancelled in favor of a single show at the PNC Bank Arts Center in Holmdel, New Jersey, on August 2, 2008. Two days later, Hughes and Cumia announced on the air that the tour would no longer continue, due to the booing that newcomer Mike Birbiglia received when he appeared on stage. Hughes revealed that Dave Attell and Jimmy Fallon turned down an offer to perform due to the hostile crowds.

== Tour dates and line-ups ==
=== Dates ===
- Show 1 — August 5, 2006 — Worcester, Massachusetts – DCU Center
- Show 2 — August 26, 2006 — Holmdel, New Jersey – PNC Bank Arts Center
- Show 3 — September 9, 2006 — Camden, New Jersey – Tweeter Center
- Show 4 — September 23, 2006 — Cleveland, Ohio – Tower City Amphitheatre
- Show 5 — April 14, 2007 — Las Vegas, Nevada – The Joint at Hard Rock Hotel and Casino
- Show 6 — June 16, 2007 — Wantagh, New York – Jones Beach Amphitheater
- Show 7 — June 30, 2007 — Uncasville, Connecticut – Mohegan Sun Arena
- Show 8 — July 21, 2007 — Mansfield, Massachusetts – Tweeter Center
- Show 9 — August 4, 2007 — Detroit, Michigan – DTE Energy Music Theatre
- Show 10 — August 18, 2007 — Bristow, Virginia – Nissan Pavilion
- Show 11 — August 25, 2007 — Holmdel, New Jersey – PNC Bank Arts Center
- Show 12 — September 15, 2007 — Camden, New Jersey – Tweeter Center
- Show 13 — August 2, 2008 — Holmdel, New Jersey – PNC Bank Arts Center

=== Line-up ===
Comedian	Show 1	Show 2	Show 3	Show 4	Show 5	Show 6	Show 7	Show 8	Show 9	Show 10	Show 11	Show 12	Show 13
Bill Burr	X	X	X	X									
Bob Kelly	X	X	X	X	X	X	X	X	X	X	X	X	X
Bob Saget	X	X	X			X	X	X	X	X	X	X	
Carlos Mencia		X							X	X			
Dom Irrera			X										
Frank Caliendo					X	X	X	X					
Greg Giraldo											X		X
Jim Breuer											X		X
Jim Norton	X	X	X	X	X	X	X	X	X	X	X	X	X
Jimmy Shubert			X										
Joe Rogan					X								
Louis C.K.						X	X	X	X	X		X	
Mike Birbiglia											X		X
Mike Destefano											X		X
Otto & George		X		X	X	X	X	X	X	X	X	X	X
Patrice O'Neal	X	X	X	X	X	X	X	X		X	X		X
Ralphie May	X		X		X								
Rich Vos	X	X	X	X	X	X	X	X	X	X	X	X	X
Rick Shapiro								X					
Stephen Lynch						X	X		X			X	
Tracy Morgan	X	X	X										
