= WQHT =

Radio station in New York City

- New York, New York; United States
- Broadcast area: New York metropolitan area
- Frequency: 97.1 MHz (HD Radio)
- Branding: Hot 97

Programming
- Language: English
- Format: Urban contemporary
- Subchannels: HD2: "La Buena 97.1 HD2" (Regional Mexican); HD3: Talk radio

Ownership
- Owner: MediaCo; (Mediaco WQHT License LLC)
- Sister stations: Radio: WBLS; TV: WASA-LD

History
- First air date: January 11, 1940
- Former call signs: W2XWG (1940–1944); WEAF-FM (1944–1946); WNBC-FM (1946–1954); WRCA-FM (1954–1960); WNBC-FM (1960–1975); WNWS-FM (1975–1977); WYNY (1977–1988)
- Call sign meaning: "Hot"

Technical information
- Licensing authority: FCC
- Facility ID: 19615
- Class: B
- ERP: 6,700 watts
- HAAT: 408 meters (1,339 ft)
- Transmitter coordinates: 40°44′54.4″N 73°59′8.5″W

Links
- Public license information: Public file; LMS
- Webcast: Listen live; HD2: Listen live
- Website: www.hot97.com

WQHT (97.1 FM, Hot 97) is a commercial radio station, licensed to New York, New York, which broadcasts an urban contemporary music format. The station is owned by MediaCo Holding, a subsidiary of the Standard General hedge fund.

WQHT's studios are located in the Hudson Square neighborhood of Lower Manhattan, and its transmitter is located at the Empire State Building.

== History ==
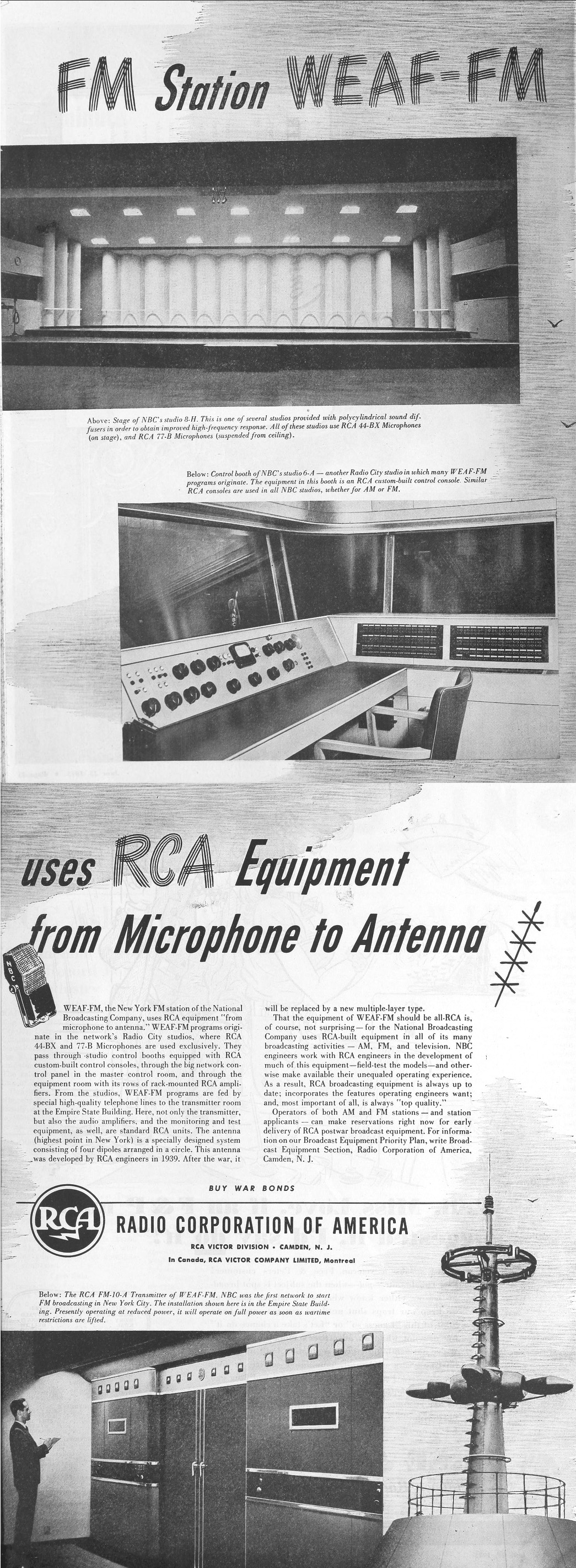
1945 RCA advertisement featuring WEAF-FM's facilities

WQHT began as an experimental station, W2XWG, licensed to the National Broadcasting Company (NBC) and located at the Empire State Building in New York City. W2XWG started operations in April 1939, initially as an "Apex" station, used for determining the coverage area of transmitting frequencies higher than those used by the standard AM broadcast band. These tests also compared amplitude modulation (AM) transmissions with the then-new technology of wide-band frequency modulation (FM). On January 11, 1940, W2XWG began regular FM broadcasts, and that July, it was reported that the station was broadcasting on 42.6 MHz from 3 to 11 p.m. on Mondays through Fridays.

In May 1940, the Federal Communications Commission (FCC) announced the establishment, effective January 1, 1941, of an FM band operating on 40 channels spanning 42–50 MHz. The first fifteen commercial FM station construction permits were issued on October 31, 1940, including one to NBC for 45.1 MHz in New York City, which was issued the call sign W51NY. However, NBC reported that equipment shortages resulting from the outbreak of World War II meant it was unable to get delivery of W51NY's high powered transmitter, and on June 10, 1942, the construction permit for commercial operation was canceled, and the W51NY call sign deleted.

Effective November 1, 1943, the FCC modified its policy for FM station call letters. Thus, when the construction permit for commercial operation was reactivated, it was assigned the call letters WEAF-FM. The station's last broadcast as W2XWG took place on September 23, 1944, with its debut as WEAF-FM coming the next day, now with seven-day-a-week programming from 3-11 p.m. that was an expansion over W2XWG's schedule of only operating Saturday through Wednesday.

The FCC later reassigned the original FM band frequencies to other services, and ordered existing stations to move to a new band from 88 to 106 MHz, which was later expanded to 88–108 MHz. During a transition period from the original FM "low band" to the new "high band", some stations for a time broadcast simultaneously on both their old and new frequencies. However, WEAF-FM did not, and in October 1945, it was announced that the station was shutting down the broadcasts on 45.1 MHz and was temporarily going silent while it made the technical adjustments needed to operate on its new assignment at 97.3 MHz.

=== WNBC-FM / WRCA-FM / WNWS-FM (1946–1977) ===
In late 1946, the station's call letters were changed to WNBC-FM. Programming was usually simulcasts of WNBC (AM)'s programming. A reallocation in the fall of 1947 moved the station to its current frequency assignment of 97.1 MHz. In the 1950s, WNBC-FM played classical music, later switching to pop music. It ran network programming for some time, such as the NBC Monitor weekend series. On October 18, 1954, the call letters were changed to WRCA-FM, reflecting NBC's then-parent company, the Radio Corporation of America, but returned to WNBC-FM on May 22, 1960.

On December 31, 1976, the station discontinued carrying NIS (which NBC would end by June 1977). The final story on NewsCenter 97, was reported by Wayne Howell Chappelle, known professionally as Wayne Howell. The station then went to a commercial break and, after airing the hourly legal ID at midnight, switched to an adult contemporary music format with a soft rock lean, under the moniker Y-97. The first song played under the new format was "Tonight's the Night" by Rod Stewart.

=== WYNY (1977–1988) ===
In April 1987, country music station WHN announced plans to go to sports full-time on July 1, becoming all-sports WFAN. In response, WYNY announced it would change to country music on the same day. This format change was told to the press in advance, but not over the air except on Saturday With Sinatra. At 12:01 a.m. on July 1, WYNY ended its AC format with "Hello, Goodbye" by The Beatles. It flipped to country music, playing "Think About Love" by Dolly Parton.

=== WQHT (1988–present) ===
In 1988, NBC began to sell its roster of radio stations, and Emmis Communications made arrangements to buy its two New York City stations, WYNY 97.1 and WNBC 660 AM.

Emmis sold the 103.5 FM license for the original WQHT to Westwood One, as well as the intellectual property for WYNY, which resulted in the WYNY call letters and country format transferring from 97.1 to 103.5 FM. Conversely, Emmis transferred the WQHT call sign and rhythmic contemporary format from 103.5 to the former WYNY at 97.1 FM, becoming "Hot 97" at 5:30 pm. September 22, 1988. The last song played on "Hot 103" was Debbie Gibson's "Stayin' Together"; the first song played on "Hot 97" was MARRS' "Pump Up the Volume".

WQHT started to lean towards top 40 by 1989 due to decreasing ratings. By 1990, the station started playing more house, freestyle, and rhythm and blues music, and launched the Saturday Night House Party show.

==== From dance to hip-hop and R&B ====
Towards the end of 1992 and early 1993, Hot 97 dropped to "dead last among New York's three pop stations." In response, Emmis named Judy Ellis its general manager (a position in which she served until 2003), and WQHT started to add more R&B and hip hop music. The station started a gradual two-year change towards an urban-oriented rhythmic top 40 format.

A new generation of "hot jocks" began appearing on "Hot 97". Dan Charnas recounted the perception of this move: "The trades ran stories on the new trend, typified by the Emmis stations, Hot 97 and Power 106: hiring street kids or entertainers with little or no radio experience at the expense of longtime professionals who had paid their dues." Among the most famous was the addition of a new morning show hosted by Ed Lover and Doctor Dré of Yo! MTV Raps. With rising ratings and a focus on East Coast artists like the Wu-Tang Clan, Charnas credited "Hot 97" as leading a comeback for East Coast hip hop.

=== Sale to Standard General ===
On July 1, 2019, Emmis Communications announced that it would sell WQHT and sister station WBLS to the public company Mediaco Holding—an affiliate of Standard General—for $91.5 million and a $5 million promissory note. In addition, Emmis will take a 23.72% stake in the new company's common equity, and continue to manage the stations under shared services agreements. The sale was completed November 25, 2019.

A significant number of hosts and DJs were laid off from the station in 2026.

== HD radio operations ==
On September 9, 2008, Emmis announced a programming partnership with WorldBand Media and to use WQHT's HD-3 signal to produce programming for the South Asian communities in three major cities including New York City.

== Controversies ==
=== 2004 Indonesia tsunami parody ===
On January 17, 2005, Miss Jones provoked a controversy by airing a song entitled "Tsunami Song" a month after approximately 167,000 people in Indonesia and 227,000 people worldwide were left dead or missing from the 2004 Indian Ocean earthquake and tsunami which affected the Asia-Pacific and Somalia. The song, a parody sung to the 1985 tune "We Are the World", was criticized for overtly racist mocking of the Asian victims; the song lyrics contain the racially derogatory word "Chinamen," and calls the drowning victims "bitches." Some of the lyrics included the words "Go find your mommy. I just saw her float by, a tree went through her head. And now your children will be sold into child slavery."

Miss Info, a fellow on-air colleague of Korean descent, was outraged and spoke against the song on the station. She excluded herself from producing the song and said it was wrong for it to be played. Miss Info was insulted by other DJs on the air. Another jock on the show, Todd Lynn, muttered "I'm gonna start shooting Asians." Following angry protests from the public, Miss Jones, DJ Envy, and Tasha Hightower were suspended for two weeks while Todd Lynn and songwriter Rick Del Gado were fired. The station issued an apology on its website. Newsday, Sprint, McDonald's and Toyota all pulled their advertising from the station.

=== Fights and shootings ===
On February 25, 2001, a shootout erupted between Lil' Kim and the entourages of Kim and rival rapper Foxy Brown in front of the offices of Hot 97 on Hudson Street, with an injury to one of Foxy's friends. It led to an investigation by the FBI and a trial which found Lil Kim guilty of perjury and sentenced to a year in prison for it in mid-2005. In February 2005, gunfire erupted in front of the same place between 50 Cent's entourage and the Game's entourage after the two rappers had a falling out with each other. The Game was quickly met by 50 Cent's crew after being notified he was at the front entrance of the building. A friend of 50 Cent pulled a gun out and shot at The Game and his entourage. A bullet hit a member of the Game's entourage in the leg. Both incidents also led to the nickname "Shot 97" by Wendy Williams.

=== Concerts ===
Wu Tang Clan member Inspectah Deck stated that the group faced a 10-year blacklist by Hot 97 after a fiasco involving their booking at the concert. In June 1997, the group was on tour with Rage Against the Machine in Europe in support of the Wu-Tang Forever album, but was also booked to perform at the Summer Jam. Deck stated that the station strong-armed the group in to flying back to the United States at their own cost to perform at the show for free, lest their relationship with the station be in jeopardy. As Hot 97 was one of the major stations that gave the group exposure during their early years, they felt it best to perform at the Summer Jam, not wanting to lose a major ally. Wu Tang member Ghostface Killah was so infuriated by this, that he shouted "Fuck Hot 97!" during the set, and got the crowd to repeatedly chant it. This led to what Deck says was a 10-year blacklist of Wu Tang from Hot 97, and even other New York radio stations, which affected their commercial reputation and music sales. The two sides would later make amends, and Wu Tang Clan performed a set at the 2013 Summer Jam.

The 2012 event made headlines when moments before Nicki Minaj was about to take to the stage, morning host Peter Rosenberg made a negative comment about her song "Starships", saying to the fans, "I see the real hip-hop heads sprinkled in here. I see them. I know there are some chicks here waiting to sing 'Starships' later—I'm not talking to y'all right now." That comment and the alleged sexual relationship between the self-proclaimed "Queen of rap" and the host Ebro Darden would prompt Lil Wayne to pull Minaj and the rest of the acts signed to Cash Money Records out of the event. Minaj later spoke to Funkmaster Flex about the incident. After that, she appeared on Rosenberg's show, with the host apologizing to her on air. She performed two songs with 2 Chainz at the following year's Summer Jam.

The 2014 event that took place on June 2 would be blasted in a comment five days later (on June 6) by Chuck D of Public Enemy, who accused the station of allowing artists who were performing there to use racial slurs and offensive language, calling it a "Sloppy Fiasco," adding that "If there was a festival and it was filled with anti-Semitic slurs... or racial slurs at anyone but black people, what do you think would happen? Why does there have to be such a double standard?" He also cites the lack of WQHT not allowing more up-and-coming artists to perform on stage. This was later addressed by Ebro Darden and Rosenberg on their morning show, responding to remarks that include the charge that Hot 97 is a "CORPlantation," but Darden, who admits that he agrees with Chuck D on addressing the issues, later pointed out by responding that "I think there's validity to what he's saying as to, 'I guess Hot 97 could be more local," and added "But people that listen to us when we research the songs don't vote those songs high enough to stay around. I have this debate and I put the onus back on the public to participate."

On June 7, 2015, more than 61 people were arrested and 10 New Jersey State Police troopers were injured after a fight over tickets and crowd capacity overshadows the 2015 Summer Jam event that was held at MetLife Stadium in East Rutherford, New Jersey. The sold-out event also caused confusion among the ticket goers who were denied entry, which added to the rioted melee. The following day (June 8), WQHT addressed the issue on its morning show and plans to refund the customers who could not get into the event, while the American Civil Liberties Union's New Jersey chapter called for the state Attorney General's office to investigate if any violations were reported.

Although the Festival Village portion was cancelled due to weather for the 2016 event, Hot 97 confirmed their annual Summer Jam will continue "rain or shine".

The event and its influence, despite losing credibility, constant rivalry between artists and with the station itself, and declining audiences, continues to be a legacy for WQHT. As Funkmaster Flex puts it: "I think a radio station such as Hot 97 has a way of keeping to the pulse...And I think why it has survived so long is you know the radio station knows what artists are on the cusp or on the come up, and they always know the legends that people wanna see."

=== On-air ===
On December 13, 2018, rapper Kodak Black walked out of the Ebro in the Morning show after host Ebro Darden questioned Black about his ongoing sexual assault case.

=== Violence and drill music controversy ===
In 2022, some individuals drew connections between the pro-gun content of Brooklyn drill to real-world gun violence on the streets of New York that had killed a number of Brooklyn drill artists.

In response to the large number of dead young people connected to the music scene, Hot 97's DJ Drewski vowed to stop playing gang/diss records in February 2022 and Ebro Darden re-iterated his ongoing objection to playing diss tracks that incite specific violence.

== Other media ventures ==
=== Hot 97 TV ===
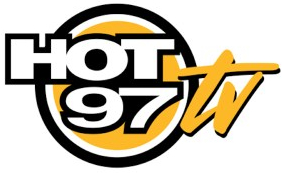

In May 2025, Mediaco Holding announced that it would launch Hot 97 TV, a free ad-supported streaming television (FAST) channel featuring programming on hip-hop music and culture hosted by WQHT personalities and others.

==== Affiliates ====
- WASA-LD (24.1) New York City (Port Jervis, New York)
- WJYS-TV (40.3) Chicago (Hammond, Indiana)
- KFAA-TV (29.2) Dallas-Fort Worth (Decatur, Texas)
- KOFY-TV (20.2) San Francisco (Bay Area)
- WDYB-CD (14.2) Orlando (Daytona Beach, Florida)
- WHOT-TV (66.1) Atlanta (Opelika, Alabama)

== See also ==
- Media in New York City
- List of the initial commercial FM station assignments issued by the Federal Communications Commission on October 31, 1940

== Sources ==
- WNBC-FM Abandons Rock For Popular Music Format – The New York Times, December 18, 1974.
- Asian Media Watchdog – One of the high profile groups that organized Tsunami Song protest
- Freestyle Music Information
- Station info on New York Radio Guide
- Former Presidents and the Hot 97 Controversy
- World Music Central – British MPs deplore Hot 97's racist tsunami song
- World Music Central – Demonstrations planned outside Hot 97 New York
- Media Week Headlines
- UK Chinese – Chinese Community ask George Bush and Tony Blair to take action against Hot 97
- UK Chinese – British MPs and the Hot 97 Tsunami Song
- Club LK.US – UK Sri Lankans denounce Hot 97's racist tsunami song
- Sunday Island Sri Lanka – Two tsunami songs mentioned in the British parliament with kudos to Nimal Mendis by Nan
- House of Congress Press Release from House Democratic Leader Nancy Pelosi: Pelosi Condemns Broadcast of 'Tsunami Song'
- Hot 97 New Yorker article
