= Rich Vos =

American comedian (born 1957)

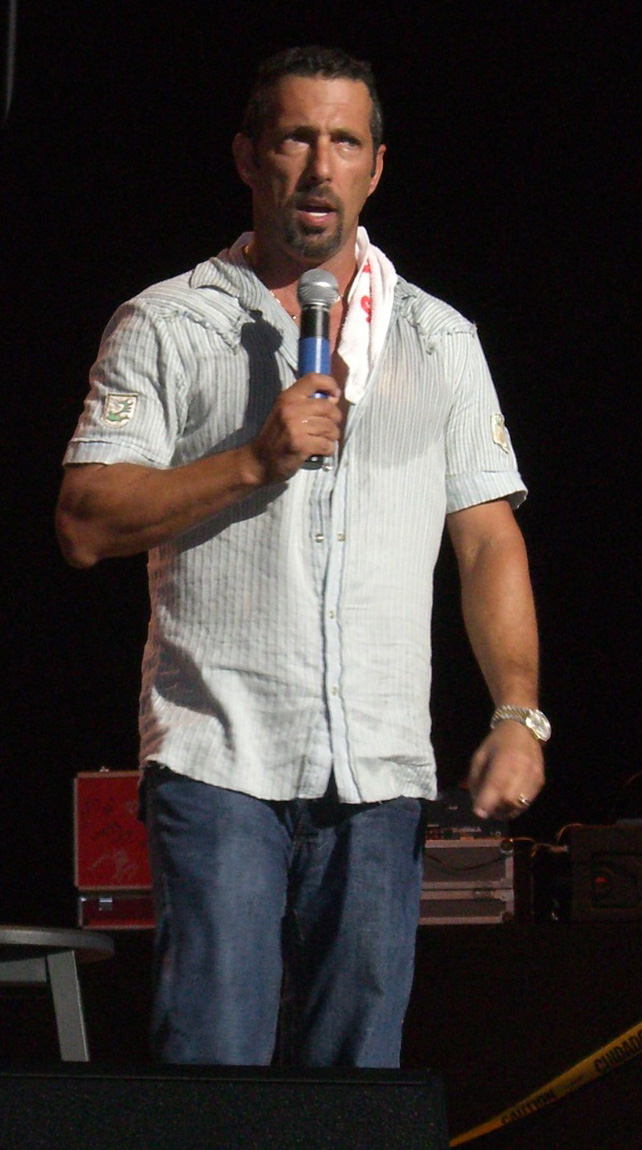
- Vos in 2007
- Born: June 30, 1957 (age 69); Plainfield, New Jersey, U.S.
- Spouse: Bonnie McFarlane (m. 2005)
- Children: 3

Comedy career
- Years active: 1984–present
- Medium: Stand-up, television, radio
- Genres: Observational comedy, black comedy, cringe comedy
- Website: richvos.com

Rich Vos (born June 30, 1957) is an American stand-up comedian, writer and actor. From 2011 to 2024, he co-hosted the podcast My Wife Hates Me with his wife, comedian Bonnie McFarlane.

== Early life ==
Vos was raised in a Jewish family who lived in an "all black neighborhood" in New Jersey. Vos's parents divorced when he was young and he did not graduate from high school. He became a fan of stand-up comedy from watching television as a child and cites acts featured on The Ed Sullivan Show as a big influence.

== Career ==
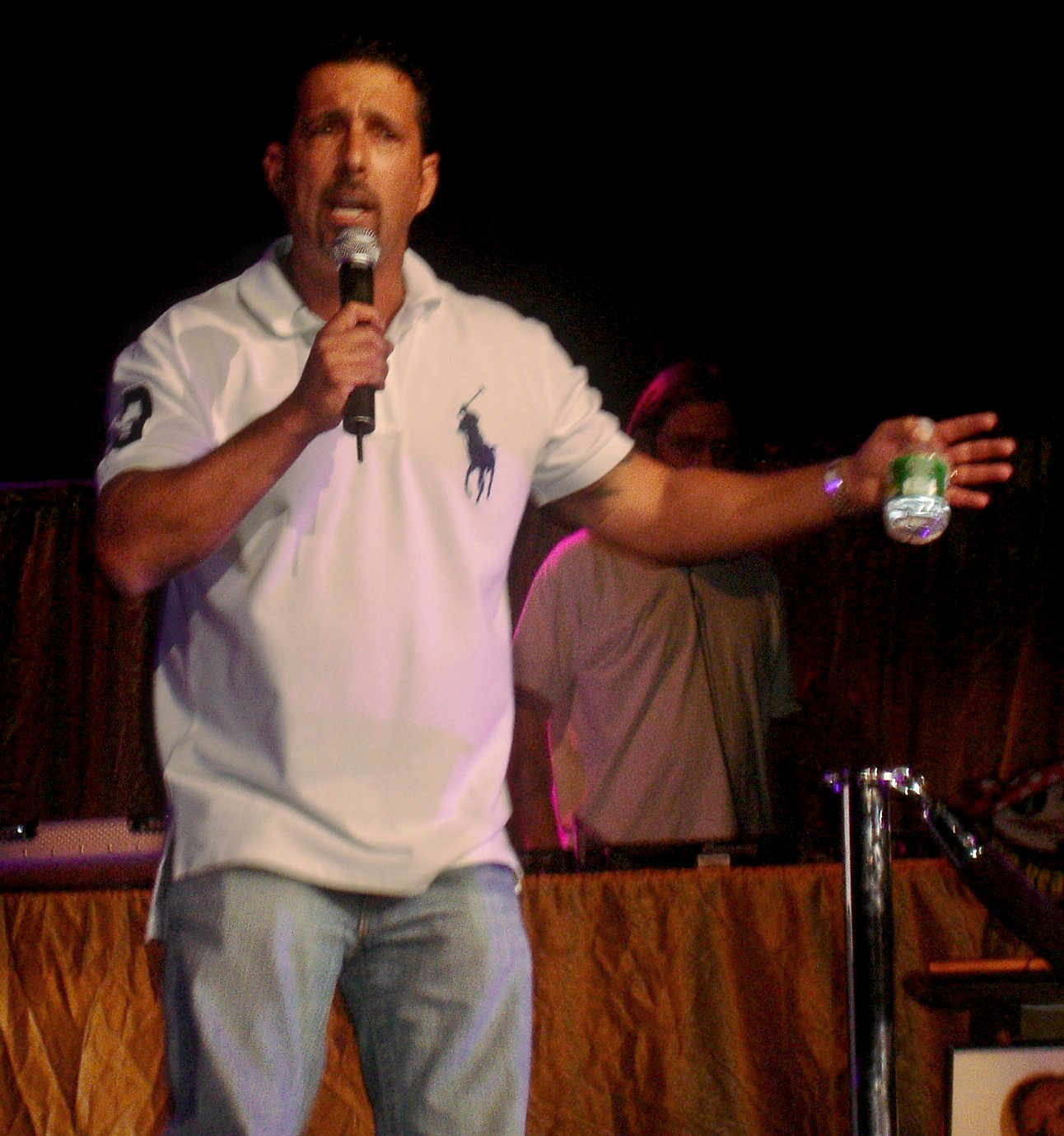
Vos on stage during Opie and Anthony's Traveling Virus Comedy Tour in 2006

Vos began his stand-up career in 1984, choosing to pursue it full-time as he "failed at everything else", and developed his act in local clubs. In 1995, Vos became the first white comic to perform a set on Def Comedy Jam on HBO, a show usually featuring African American comedians. In July 1999, Vos hosted at the Woodstock '99 festival, later calling it a highlight of his career. In 2000, Vos received the Bistro Award for Outstanding Achievement as Comedy Performer. In 2001, Vos played the bouncer and wrote and performed skits on the British television show The People vs. Jerry Sadowitz.

In 2001, Vos released his first stand-up comedy album, I'm Killing Here. This was followed by the DVD Vos in 2004, consisting of an unedited, 55-minute performance recorded at the Stress Factory in New Jersey. He went on to produce two half-hour specials on Comedy Central Presents.

From 2002 to 2004, Vos was a frequent guest on Tough Crowd with Colin Quinn on Comedy Central. He picked the show as one of his favorites to do as he lived close to its filming location and by the fact that he could do it with his best friends. In 2003, Vos finished third on the first season of Last Comic Standing on NBC. During this time he was given the nickname "The Don" by Cory Kahaney "because of my rough and tough demeanor ... maybe it was more because I was the most experienced comic". At the end of the season, Vos toured with Kahaney and Dave Mordal for eight months. In 2004, Vos was a finalist in its third season.

Vos was a frequent guest on the Opie and Anthony radio show, with jokes centered at his expense, most often highlighting his speech impediment or lack of intellect. In 2002, he was responsible for having fellow comedian Patrice O'Neal come on the show, who also became a popular regular guest. When the show aired on SiriusXM Radio, Vos hosted a Saturday night program with his wife Bonnie McFarlane. He hosted the 2006 and 2007 editions of the Opie and Anthony's Traveling Virus Comedy Tour.

Between 2006 and 2008, Vos prepared three pilot episodes for a comedy series alongside McFarlane, but none were picked up by a network.

He was featured in a segment of the television show, What Would You Do?.

From November 2011 to December 2024, Vos and McFarlane co-hosted the comedy podcast My Wife Hates Me.

In 2016, Vos released his fifth comedy album V, of which its material took between one year and a half and two years to develop. It charted at number one on the iTunes and Billboard release charts.

== Personal life ==
Vos has married twice. He and his first wife have two daughters, Jessica and Ellen. In September 2005, Vos married comedian Bonnie McFarlane. Their daughter Rayna was born in 2007. Vos resides in Hillsborough Township, New Jersey to be closer to his children.

After struggling with crack cocaine and alcohol addiction throughout his 20s, Vos completed a one-month rehabilitation course in 1987, three years into his comedy career. He has been clean since.

== Stand-up releases ==
- I'm Killing Here! (2001)
- Vos (2004)
- Vos: Live in Philly (2010)
- Still Empty Inside (2011)
- 141 IQ (2016)
- V (2016)
- When I Saw Hamilton... (2019)
- VII (2022)
- VIII (2026)
