= Rick Del Gado =

American radio personality and producer

Rick Delgado is an American radio personality and producer.

== Career ==
Delgado first gained prominence as the producer for the Opie and Anthony radio show from 1998 to 2002, when the show aired in afternoons on WNEW in New York City. He was fired after the show was cancelled following its controversial "Sex for Sam 3" segment, in which a couple were encouraged to engage in sexual activity in St. Patrick's Cathedral.

Following his departure from WNEW, Delgado joined Preston & Steve on WPLY in Philadelphia. About a year later, he returned to New York City at WQHT in New York City. He was fired on January 31, 2005, along with comedian Todd Lynn, for writing, producing and broadcasting "The Tsunami Song", a parody of the 1985 hit single "We Are the World" which mocked the victims of the 2004 Indian Ocean earthquake and tsunami.

In June 2005, Delgado was hired by KYLD/WILD in San Francisco to co-host and produce Strawberry in the Morning with "Strawberry" Eric Fielden and Fay Carmona.

In 2006, Delgado accompanied former radio show guest and aspiring singer Gilbert Gonzalez Jr. to an American Idol audition. Creating a sign with Gonzalez's face that read "Gilbert stinks", Delgado heckled him before and during the audition attempting to cause Gonzalez to fail. Gonzalez succeeded the preliminary rounds of the show regardless. Despite having been recently fired from the radio show that began reporting the progress of Gonzalez on the show, Delgado still followed Gonzalez for his next round of American Idol.

In January 2007, Delgado and Fielden became the hosts of The EF'R Show on KFRC in San Francisco until the station changed radio format in May 2007. Currently, Delgado hosted Ugly American Radio on Inravio Radio. He currently hosts Elevated Radio. As of 2023 he’s a co host on Real America's Voice Network Show Live from Studio 6B.
