= Anthony Cumia =

American broadcaster (born 1961)

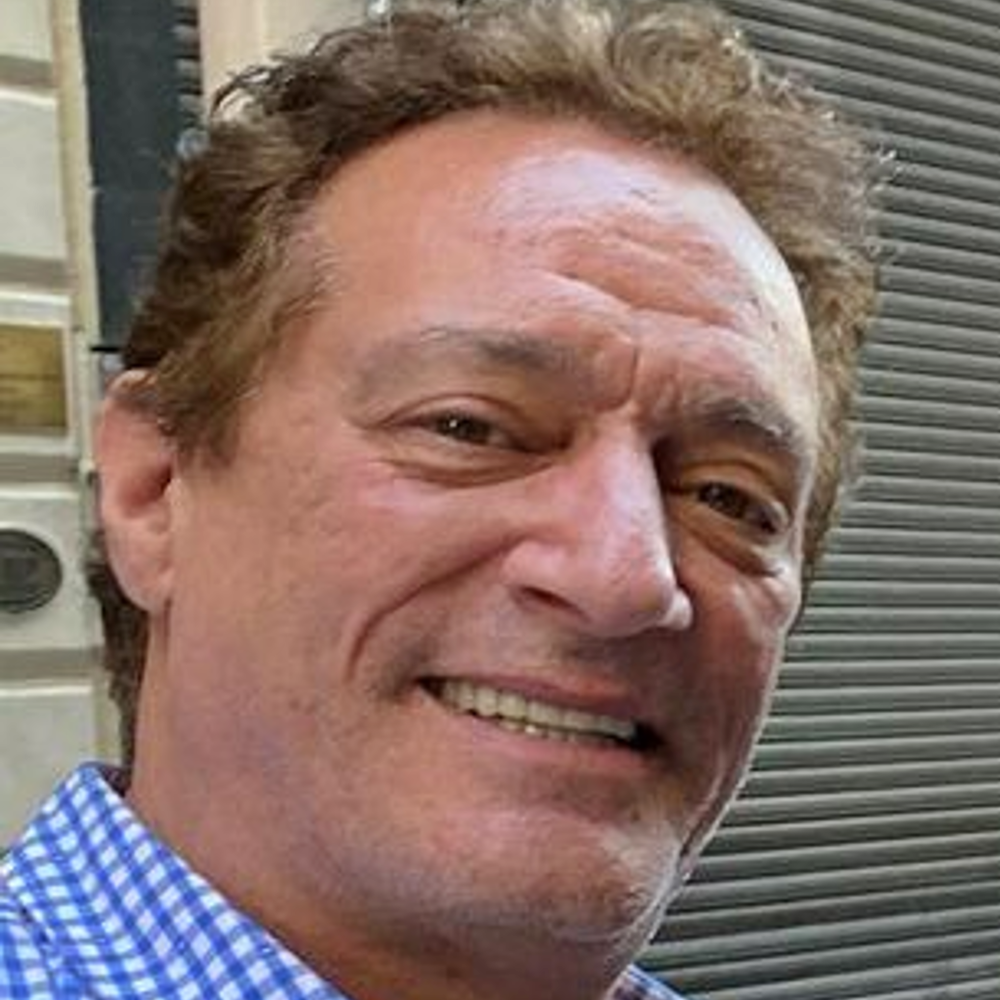
- Cumia in 2021
- Born: April 26, 1961 (age 65); New York City, U.S.
- Spouse: Jennifer Cumia (m. 1990; div. 2002)
- Presenting career
- Show: The Anthony Cumia Show
- Network: Compound Censored; WABC
- Show: Compound Censored
- Network: Compound Censored
- Country: United States
- Previous shows: Opie and Anthony; The Artie and Anthony Show

Anthony Cumia (born April 26, 1961) is an American shock jock, podcaster and broadcaster. He is the host of The Anthony Cumia Show on WABC's Talkradio 77 and the online video platform Compound Censored. He was the co-host of the Opie and Anthony radio show, along with Gregg "Opie" Hughes, which aired from 1995 to 2014.

In 2014, Cumia was fired by SiriusXM Radio after posting a series of tweets in which he claimed to have been assaulted by a Black woman. In 2015, he was arrested for assaulting his then-girlfriend and pled guilty to third-degree assault and criminal obstruction of breathing. He started his own video podcast soon after named The Anthony Cumia Show, which aired until September 2017, when he started The Artie and Anthony Show with comedian and actor Artie Lange. In May 2018, Lange left the show and was replaced by Dave Landau; the show's name reverted to The Anthony Cumia Show.

== Early life ==
Cumia was born in New York City, into an Italian-American family. He has an elder brother, Joe, and a younger sister, Dawn. The family lived in various locations on Long Island including Elwood and East Islip. Cumia attended Timber Point Elementary School in East Islip, followed by Cuba Hill School and Elwood-John H. Glenn High School in Elwood. One of his teachers was actress Joyce MacKenzie. After his parents separated, Cumia spent his early teenage years living with his father in San Juan Capistrano, California.

Before he started his radio career, Cumia installed heating, ventilation, and air conditioning systems. He wanted to get into radio, and was influenced by popular New York City personalities Howard Stern and Don Imus.

== Career ==
=== Opie and Anthony (1994–2014) ===
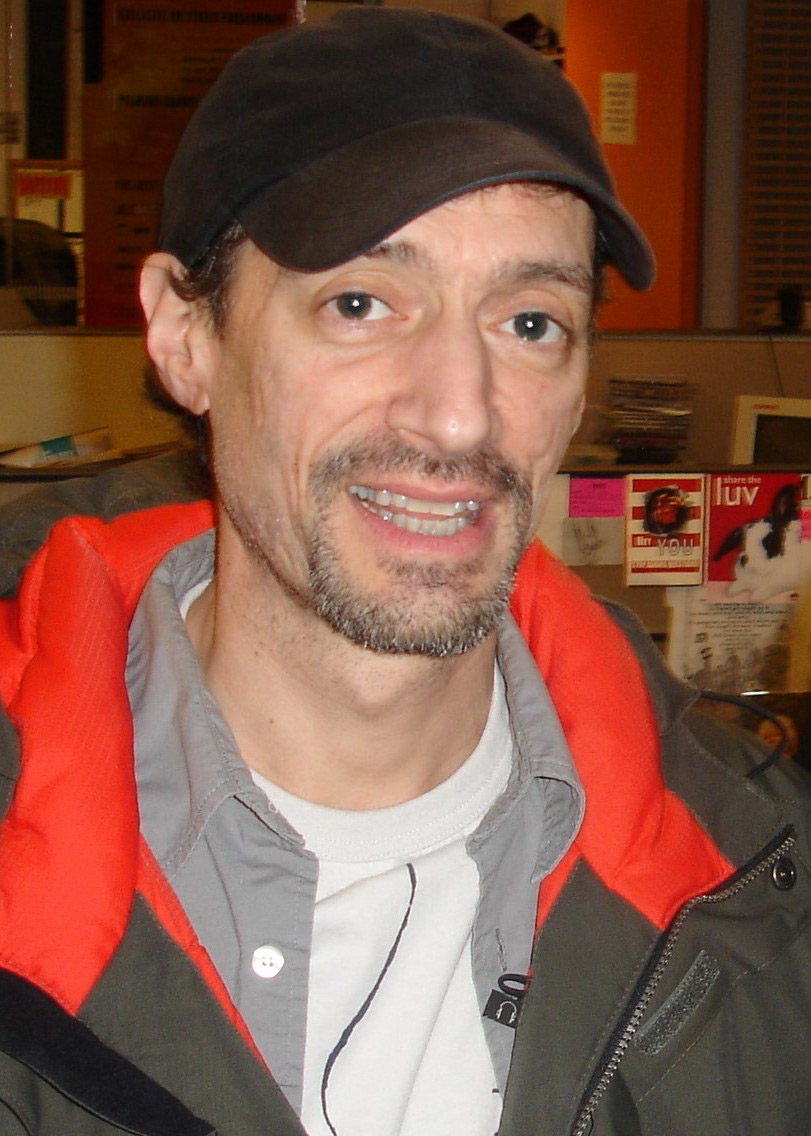
Cumia at the XM studio in 2005

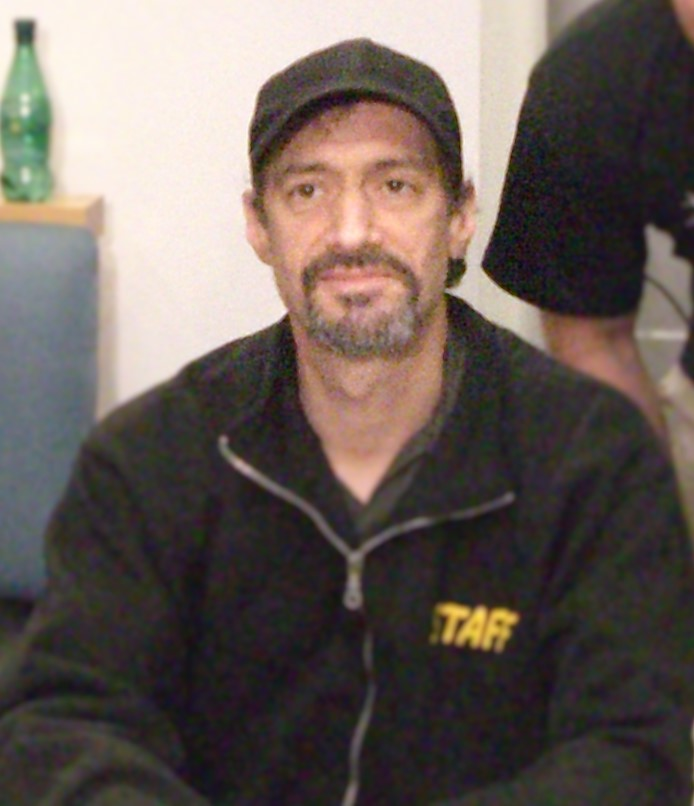
Cumia in 2007

Cumia first met radio personality Gregg "Opie" Hughes when the latter held an O. J. Simpson song parody contest on his Nighttime Attitude show on Long Island radio station WBAB. He and his brother Joe decided to enter the contest, and recorded an entry as Rotgut titled "Gonna Electric Shock OJ" to the tune of "(Sittin' On) The Dock of the Bay" by Otis Redding. The song was a hit with Hughes, who played it several times on his show and, in September 1994, invited the Cumias to the studio to perform the song live. Cumia began to contribute and produce comedy bits for Hughes and the station's morning show soon after.

Hughes and Cumia accepted an offer to host afternoons at WAAF in Boston, Massachusetts, and launched Opie and Anthony in March 1995. Cumia originally thought that by getting into radio he would make very good money, but later said his salary at WAAF was barely higher than doing manual labour. The pair were fired in April 1998 for an April Fool's Day prank that had listeners believe Boston Mayor Thomas Menino was killed in a car accident while transporting a young female Haitian prostitute.

In June 1998, Opie and Anthony began at WNEW in New York City in afternoons, becoming a top 10 afternoon drive show in two years. Around 2000, Hughes considered leaving the show but Cumia convinced him to stay as Infinity Broadcasting promised them a more lucrative contract and have the show nationally syndicated. The show developed further when comedian Jim Norton joined the show as their co-host in 2001. By mid-2002, Opie and Anthony was syndicated on 17 stations nationwide. On August 22, 2002, Opie and Anthony was cancelled over their "Sex for Sam 3" segment five days earlier that involved a Virginia couple having simulated sex in St. Patrick's Cathedral. Infinity kept Hughes and Cumia from being hired for the duration of their contract which expired in mid-2004.

On October 4, 2004, the show returned to the air on XM Satellite Radio, a subscription-based satellite radio service. From April 2006 to March 2009, part of the show was simulcast on nine terrestrial radio stations owned by CBS Radio that were compliant with the broadcast regulations imposed by the Federal Communications Commission. During this time, XM suspended the show for thirty days on May 15, 2007, after a homeless man, dubbed "Homeless Charlie", who appeared on the show, expressed his wish to rape Condoleezza Rice and Laura Bush.

On July 3, 2014, Cumia was fired by SiriusXM for a series of purportedly racist tweets in which he condemned a black woman who he said assaulted him and described her as an "animal"; the tweets were described by the company as "racially-charged and hate-filled". Cumia said that he was repeatedly punched by her as he was taking pictures in Times Square. In the following week, Cumia refused to apologize for the incident. He deleted the tweets after being fired.

=== Live from the Compound (2012–2014) ===
During his time at SiriusXM, Cumia gradually built a studio in his basement to broadcast. In 2012, he launched Live from the Compound via Ustream which he started as a hobby and involved discussions on a variety of matters and "drunk karaoke". Vice Media co-founder and commentator Gavin McInnes was a regular on the show. Cumia retired the program in 2014.

=== Compound Media and The Anthony Cumia Show (2014–present) ===
In the week after his firing from SiriusXM in July 2014, Cumia announced the launch of The Anthony Cumia Show. The show launched on August 4, 2014, through his subscription-based network Compound Media, which was initially known as The Anthony Cumia Network, from Monday through Thursday from 4–6 pm. In June 2015, Cumia expanded the network with new shows added to the weekly schedule. In August 2015, Cumia relocated his show to a studio in New York City and hired far-right commentator Gavin McInnes.

On August 21, 2017, Cumia announced comedian and actor Artie Lange as the co-host of his new show, The Artie and Anthony Show. The show launched on September 5 and continued on the same schedule as The Anthony Cumia Show. The show lasted eight months and ended with Lange's departure on May 14, 2018. One week before Lange's departure, the show had added comedian Dave Landau as a permanent third mic. With Lange leaving the show, Landau took over as co-host and the show title switched to The Anthony Cumia Show with Dave Landau.

Cumia was suspended from Twitter (now X) for abusive comments in 2017. He then made a series of accounts that were also suspended. By 2021, he was permanently suspended by the site for ban evasion. He was later allowed to return and maintains an active account on X as @AnthonyCumia. He posted tweets saying that Black people were "incapable or unwilling to assimilate to a civil western society", calling them "things", "monsters", and "animals".

On November 20, 2018, Post Hill Press released Cumia's memoir, titled Permanently Suspended: The Rise and Fall... and Rise Again of Radio's Most Notorious Shock Jock. It features a foreword by Jim Norton.

In February 2021, Dave Landau left The Anthony Cumia Show with Dave Landau to join Louder with Crowder on Blaze Media, with the show's name reverting to The Anthony Cumia Show.

On March 31, 2021, Cumia launched a second show titled Compound Censored, which he co-hosts with Vice Media co-founder and comedic commentator Gavin McInnes. The show's title is a portmanteau which combines Compound Media with McInnes' subscription-based network Censored.TV, where the show also broadcasts.

In June 2024, Cumia announced that the Compound Media studios were closing, and that he was merging his network and The Anthony Cumia Show with Gavin McInnes' Censored.TV network. McInnes changed the name of his platform to Compound Censored after the merger.

In July 2026, Cumia reunited with Jim Norton for the "Anthony and Jim Show" podcast on Patreon and Youtube, with extended shows for Patreon subscribers.

=== WABC ===
In February 2025, it was announced that Cumia would be joining WABC's Talkradio 77 as host of a weekly radio version of The Anthony Cumia Show. The show debuted on March 9. On March 11, less than 48 hours after the show's debut, Red Apple Audio Networks announced the syndication of The Anthony Cumia Show following significant interest from stations nationwide.

== Other ventures ==
=== XFL Gameday ===
Along with Opie, Cumia co-hosted XFL Gameday, a pregame show for Vince McMahon's startup football league, for four weeks in February 2001. The half-hour show was produced by NBC's owned and operated stations and shown on Channel 4 in New York. The show was taped on Wednesdays at "WWF New York" in Times Square, and was open to the public. It featured analysis by WNBC sportscaster Bruce Beck and New York/New Jersey Hitmen head coach Rusty Tillman, but also featured plenty of raunch. One segment featured Opie and Anthony as chefs, inserting a cucumber between two melons.

After the show's cancellation four weeks into the season, XFL creator Vince McMahon stated that he'd had no creative control over the show, further elaborating, "I heard it was horrible. Had I seen it, I would have shut it down."

=== Demented World ===
Opie, along with Anthony released a compilation of segments from their show that aired on WAAF on a CD entitled Demented World in November 1997.

=== Opie and Anthony's Traveling Virus Comedy Tour ===
The Traveling Virus was a comedy tour headlined by Opie and Anthony, as well as friends of the show, that performed in various cities during 2006, 2007, and 2008.

=== Search and Destroy ===
On the morning of March 26, 2008, Opie & Anthony revealed they had taped a pilot for Comedy Central. The show was titled Search & Destroy and it featured teams of comedians performing various tasks throughout New York City. Opie and Anthony believe that it may have been too graphic even for cable television. Comedy Central did not pick the show up.

==== Grand Theft Auto V ====
In 2013, Cumia voiced Chef in Rockstar Games' Grand Theft Auto V. He also provided vocals for the game's fictional Pißwasser beer commercial.

== Personal life ==
In 1987, Cumia met the future Jennifer Cumia who was dating his brother, Joseph Cumia, at the time. Anthony began dating her in 1989 after she broke up with Joseph, and the two married after seven months. Jennifer filed for divorce in 1999. After a series of disputes over the settlement, the divorce was finalized in March 2002. Cumia later stated that marrying Jennifer was the biggest mistake of his life. He then dated a woman he met on the show, Melinda, better known as "Lobster Girl", which became the source of online taunts against him, as he confirmed on their show. After they parted ways, he dated Jill Nicolini in 2008, and then model Melissa Stetten in 2012. Cumia dated Danielle Brand until 2015.

Cumia is a supporter of the National Rifle Association of America and has had a carry permit for New York City.

In 2006, Cumia bought a home in Roslyn Heights, New York, for $2.9 million. In 2020, he sold the home for $2.5 million, intending to move to a southern state that more closely aligned with his views. Cumia eventually bought a property in South Carolina, which is now his primary residence.

=== Domestic violence conviction ===
On December 19, 2015, in his home, Cumia assaulted his 26-year-old girlfriend Danielle Brand, the daughter of Stress Factory owner Vinnie Brand. He was arrested by Nassau County police on charges of strangulation, assault, criminal mischief, and unlawful imprisonment. Prosecutors said that Cumia had choked Brand, pinned her against the wall, and stomped on her hand. She had a broken rib, chest pain, and a swollen arm. Cumia was released without bail on December 21, at which time his attorney stated that Cumia denied the allegations.

In June 2016 Cumia pled guilty to third-degree assault and criminal obstruction of breathing in a plea deal. He was required to enter a six-month batterer's intervention program and alcohol abuse treatment. Cumia later admitted on his show to biting Brand's hand because he "was pissed" and "out of [his] mind". Cumia spent April 2016 in a rehabilitation facility in the Tampa Bay area in Florida. He said that although his decision to enter rehab was related to the December 2015 incident, it was not court-ordered.
