= Gregg Hughes =

American radio personality and podcast host

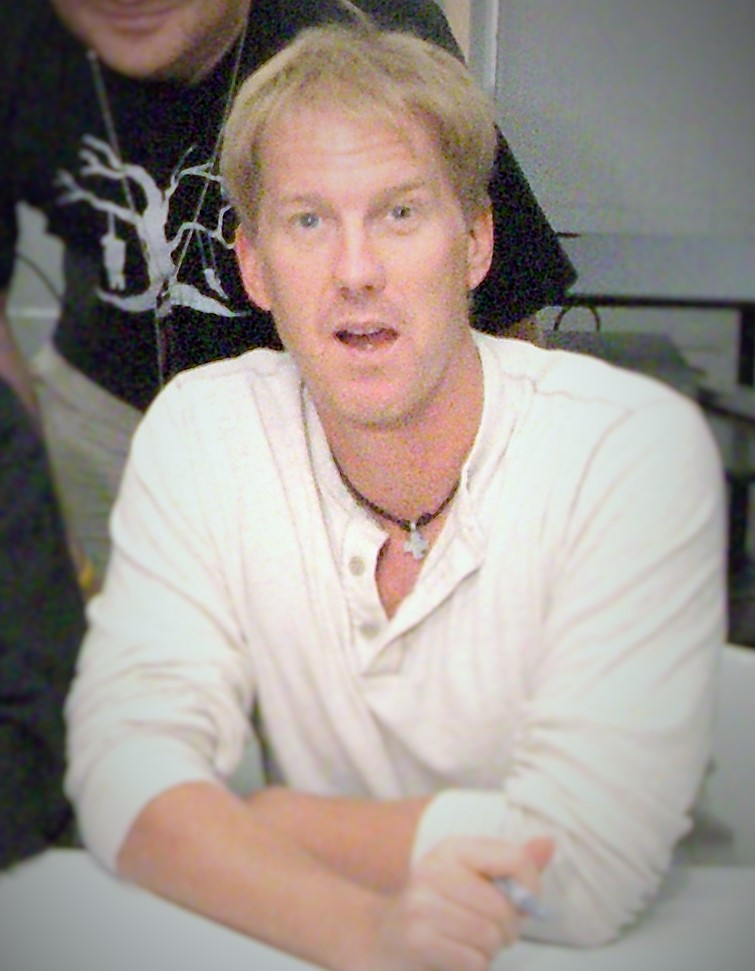
- Hughes in 2007
- Born: May 23, 1963 (age 63); New York City, U.S.
- Other name: Opie
- Spouse: Lynsi Smigo (m. 2008)
- Children: 2
- Presenting career
- Previous shows: Opie and Anthony (1995–2014); Opie with Jim Norton (2014–2016); The Opie Radio Show (2016–2017)
- Website: www.opieradio.com

Gregg Hughes (born May 23, 1963) better known by his air name Opie, is an American radio personality and podcast host. He is best known as the former co-host of the Opie and Anthony radio show that aired from 1995 until 2014 with Anthony Cumia, as well as comedian Jim Norton beginning in 2001. Following Cumia's firing from SiriusXM in 2014, Hughes and Norton stayed on as co-hosts of Opie with Jim Norton. In 2016, Hughes began hosting his own program, The Opie Radio Show, which continued until his termination in 2017, after he installed a toilet camera to film a fellow employee in the men's restroom without consent.

In 2018, Hughes launched his new podcast, The Opie Radio Podcast on the Westwood One network. Due to low listenership, in 2019, Westwood One terminated the relationship. The podcast would continue afterwards without sponsorship.

== Early life ==
Hughes was born in New York City and raised in an Irish-American family in Centerport, New York, on Long Island. He has described his mother as "pretty strict". He gained the nickname "Opie" because of his childhood resemblance to Opie Taylor, a fictional character from The Andy Griffith Show portrayed by Ron Howard.

In 1981, Hughes graduated from Harborfields High School in Greenlawn, New York; his yearbook lists basketball, the New York Islanders hockey team, skiing, and films as his interests. He was a brother of the Phi Sigma Epsilon fraternity. During his time studying, Hughes worked air shifts at the university radio station.

== Career ==
=== Early career ===
After graduating from college, Hughes landed a job in the promotions department at WCMF in Rochester, New York, but soon moved to work on the station's morning show then hosted by Brother Wease. Hughes credits Wease as a mentor in developing his on-air personality and furthering his career. Hughes left WCMF to work the midnight to 6:00 a.m. shift at WUFX in Buffalo, New York. As the station was unsupervised during his shift, Hughes was able to develop his style further by performing more outrageous bits, like broadcasting from the roof of the station's building and interviewing passers-by on the street.

Hughes's next job was at WBAB on Long Island as the host of The Nighttime Attitude, a rock music show from 8:00 p.m. to midnight. In August 1994, Hughes held an O. J. Simpson song parody contest for listeners surrounding the outcome of Simpson's murder case. One of the participants was from a local band named Rotgut that featured Anthony Cumia as lead singer with his brother Joe on guitar. The two performed "Gonna Electric Shock O. J." sung to the tune of "(Sittin' On) The Dock of the Bay" by Otis Redding. The song became a hit on Hughes's show, and the two made their first appearance in September 1994 to perform the song live. Cumia made several more appearances soon after; in early 1995, he and Hughes decided to become a radio team.

=== Opie and Anthony ===
After Hughes produced an air check and had sent it to several radio stations, he and Cumia accepted an offer from WAAF in Boston to host afternoons. The show launched as Opie and Anthony on March 13, 1995. They remained in Boston until they were fired in April 1998 from WAAF for an April Fool's Day prank involving Mayor Thomas Menino. Opie and Anthony told their listeners that Menino had been killed in a collision with a semi-trailer truck on interstate 95 while traveling with a young female Haitian prostitute in Jacksonville, Florida.

In June 1998, Hughes and Cumia were back on New York station WNEW-FM, where they became a top 10 afternoon drive show in New York by 2000. In 1999, Hughes considered leaving the show; however Anthony convinced him to stay, and bring Jim Norton on full-time as a go-between for their off air troubles. Anthony attributed these issues to his divorce and off-air personal troubles.

In 2001, Opie and Anthony signed a syndication deal with Infinity to syndicate their show on 22 stations nationwide, including WBCN in Boston, longtime rival of WAAF.

On August 15, 2002, during "Sex for Sam 3", comedian Paul Mecurio encouraged Brian Florence and Loretta Harper, a Virginia couple visiting Manhattan, to have anal sex in a vestibule at St. Patrick's Cathedral. Intense media scrutiny led to many demanding that Opie and Anthony be fired. Opie and Anthony broadcast the next day, but the show went into reruns the following week. On August 22, Infinity suspended Opie and Anthony for the duration of their contract and canceled the show.

Opie and Anthony returned to the air on October 4, 2004, exclusively for XM Satellite Radio.

On April 24, 2006, Opie and Anthony announced that they had signed a deal with CBS Radio in which the first three hours of the show would be broadcast on nine of CBS's rock stations, the first official show airing April 26.

On May 15, 2007, XM suspended Opie and Anthony for 30 days, in response to a broadcast featuring a homeless man brought into the studio. Opie and Anthony dubbed the man, who mentioned the possibility of raping Condoleezza Rice and Laura Bush, "Homeless Charlie". After the suspension they returned to their normal split schedule. Later on the same year, Opie gave a cake to a homeless person as a reward for a competition on his show. However, Opie decided to record himself stomping on the homeless man's cake after he offered Opie a part of the cake.

On March 9, 2009, Opie and Anthony were heard on FM for the last time, and spent much of the time discussing the impending format change, and how their services were "no longer needed" at the station. Their executive producer for the FM portion, Michael "Stuntbrain" Opelka, was fired the following day. Following their removal from FM, they returned to being exclusively heard on Sirius XM until Anthony's firing in July 2014.

=== Opie with Jim Norton ===
On July 3, 2014, Cumia was fired by SiriusXM, after making a series of tweets following an alleged off-air incident with a black woman on the street. Cumia tweeted that he was punched by the woman while attempting to take a picture in Times Square. The tweets were described by Sirius XM as "racially-charged and hate-filled".

At the time of Cumia's firing SiriusXM made no comment as to Hughes's possible future with the company. Cumia gave his blessing for the Sirius XM show to continue without him, acknowledging Hughes and Norton's obligation to fulfill their contract with SiriusXM. A relaunched Opie with Jim Norton Show resumed on July 14, 2014, with Hughes and Norton discussing the incident and noting that The Opie and Anthony Channel was renamed Sirius XM Talk, along with various other alterations by the company in light of the firing. In October 2014, Hughes and Norton signed a new contract to continue the SiriusXM show, and the channel was re-branded to Opie Radio which was kept until January 2017.

=== The Opie Radio Show ===
On October 3, 2016, Hughes announced his new weekday afternoon show on the Opie Radio channel from 3:00 p.m. to 6:00 p.m. The Opie Radio Show launched on October 4, 2016.

The final broadcast of The Opie Radio Show aired on June 29, 2017. During the broadcast, Hughes got into a heated on-air argument with one of the show's producers Paul Ofcharsky over an incident several weeks prior where Hughes was video taping SiriusXM's talent booker Roland Campos while he was defecating in the SiriusXM restroom, with Hughes and frequent guest Sherrod Small both harshly criticizing Ofcharsky for supporting Campos when the incident was reported to SiriusXM's Human Resources department. On July 6, 2017, a week after the show's final broadcast, Hughes was fired over the restroom incident, as reported online. It came almost three years to the day of Cumia's firing. Later in the day, Hughes tweeted: "I can honestly say I have no idea exactly what's going on as I tweet this. More when I know." On July 7, Hughes confirmed his firing via a YouTube video, stating that he had not been allowed to say "Your mom's box", a phrase from Opie and Anthony, on the air on his last shift, so he wrote it in the sand on the beach where he shot the video.

=== Podcast ===
On March 19, 2018, Hughes said that he had signed a contract with Westwood One to develop a podcast and a traditionally syndicated radio show for the network. On May 2, it was announced that the podcast, Opie Radio would debut the following week with the first episode airing on May 9. In June 2019, Hughes announced that although his relationship with Westwood One had ended, the podcast would continue.

== Other ventures ==
=== XFL Gameday ===
In February 2001, Hughes and Cumia hosted XFL Gameday, a half-hour pre-game show for Vince McMahon's startup football league that aired nationally on Saturday nights on select NBC affiliates prior to the evening's games. The show was taped on Wednesdays at the WWF's theme restaurant in Times Square and was open to the public. It featured analysis by WNBC sportscaster Bruce Beck and New York/New Jersey Hitmen head coach Rusty Tillman, but also featured plenty of raunch. One segment featured the hosts as chefs, inserting a cucumber in between two melons. The pair were almost banned from Giants Stadium for life during the filming of one episode when they imitated a proposed XFL rule where first possession was determined by placing the ball at midfield and having two opposing team-members attempt to get it. They did this as "God Bless America" began to play before a game. They said that the $100,000 cost of making each new show was the cause of its demise, though no official reason was given for its cancellation.

=== Demented World ===
The pair released a compilation of segments from their show that aired on WAAF on a CD entitled Demented World in November 1997.

=== Opie and Anthony Traveling Virus ===
The Traveling Virus was a comedy tour headlined by Hughes and Cumia, as well as friends of the show, that had shows in various cities during 2006, 2007, and 2008.

=== Search and Destroy ===
On the morning of March 26, 2008, Hughes and Cumia revealed they had taped a pilot for Comedy Central. The show was titled Search & Destroy and features teams of comedians performing various tasks throughout New York City. Comedy Central did not pick the show up; the two believed that it may have been too graphic even for cable television.

== Personal life ==
In 2004, Hughes began to date Lynsi Smigo. The two met during an event in Philadelphia to promote the return of Opie and Anthony on XM. On September 5, 2007, Hughes announced their engagement; the two married on November 22, 2008. They have two children and the family lives in New York City.

In 2008, the couple sued Steppin' Out magazine columnist Chaunce Hayden for $10 million. Hayden had claimed in his column to have become aware of the existence of a sex tape of Smigo and Bam Margera, a claim he later retracted. On March 16, 2010, the lawsuit was dismissed as the judge ruled that the original news story was newsworthy, noting that all parties had agreed that no sex tape actually existed.
