= The Anthony Cumia Show =

American talk show podcast

- Other names: TACS
- Genre: Talk; Comedy; American politics
- Running time: 2-3 hours (4:00 pm – 7:00 pm); Monday-Thursday, EST
- Country of origin: United States
- Language: English
- Home station: Compound Censored; WABC
- Starring: Anthony Cumia
- Produced by: Self; Garrett Andritz (2014-2024)
- Executive producer: Erik Nagel (2014-2024)
- Recording studio: Greenville, South Carolina
- Original release: August 4, 2014
- No. of episodes: 2113 (as of July 21, 2026)
- Website: censored.tv/watch/show/tacs

The Anthony Cumia Show (TACS) is an American audio and video podcast hosted by radio personality and former Opie and Anthony co-host Anthony Cumia, which airs on the subscription-based online streaming platform, Compound Censored and WABC's Talkradio 77. The show airs live from Greenville, South Carolina, previously airing from Cumia's home studio in Roslyn Heights, New York, and from 2015 to 2024 in Manhattan.

In 2017, Cumia decided to bring in a co-host for a new show, choosing comedian and actor Artie Lange. The Artie and Anthony Show launched on September 5, 2017. Following Lange's departure on May 15, 2018, the title reverted to The Anthony Cumia Show. In 2024, Compound Media merged with Gavin McInnes's network, Censored.TV, seeing the renaming of Censored.TV to Compound Censored.

== History ==
=== Background ===
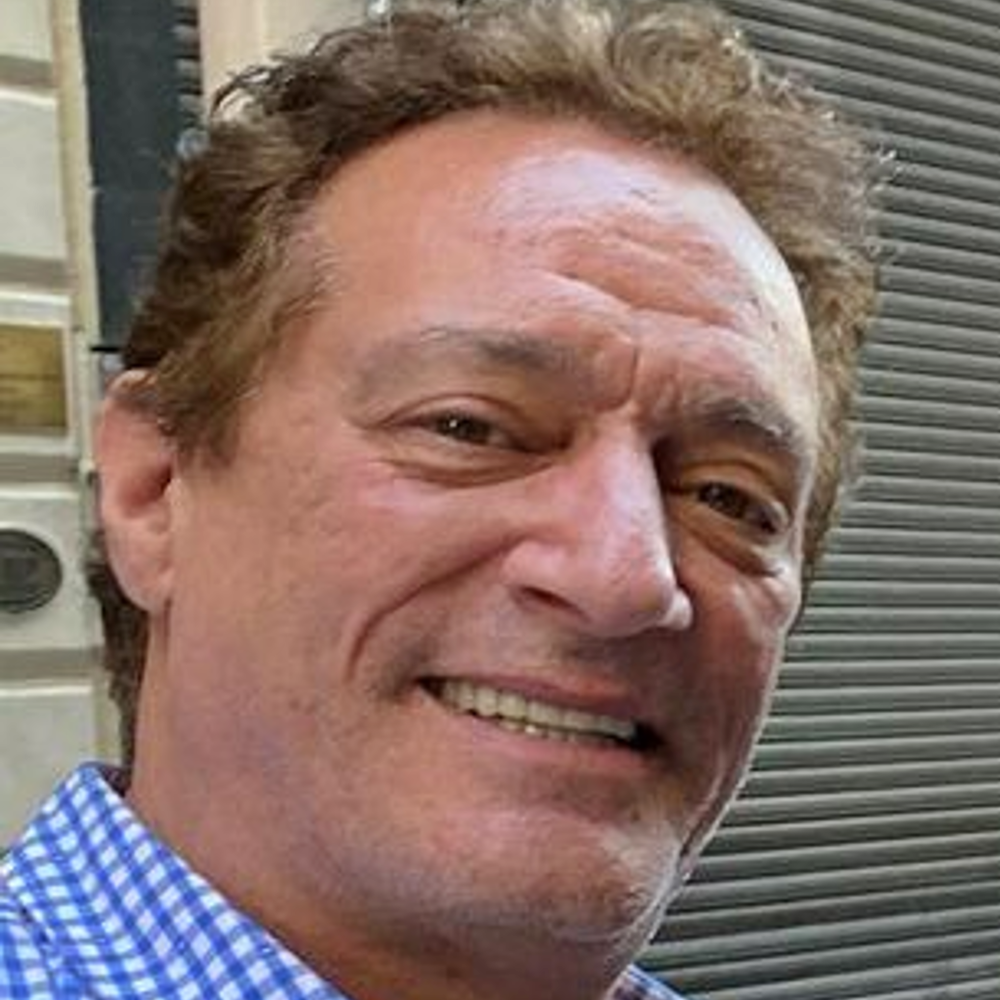
Cumia in 2021

On July 3, 2014, Cumia was fired by SiriusXM after making a series of racially-charged tweets, following an off-air incident with a black woman on the street. Cumia was allegedly punched by the woman while attempting to take pictures of Times Square. Cumia stated on the Saturday, July 12 episode of Red Eye w/Greg Gutfeld that he was not going to apologize for the incident. Cumia deleted the tweets after being fired. At the time of Cumia's firing SiriusXM made no comment as to Hughes' possible future with the company at that time. Cumia gave his blessing for the Sirius XM show to continue without him, acknowledging Hughes and Norton's obligation to fulfil their contract with SiriusXM. A relaunched Opie with Jim Norton resumed on July 14, 2014 with Hughes and Norton discussing the incident and noting that The Opie and Anthony Channel was renamed SiriusXM Talk, along with various other alterations by the company in light of the firing. In October 2014, Hughes and Norton signed a new contract to continue the SiriusXM show, which appeared on the rebranded, and now defunct, Opie Radio channel.

=== Launch and developments ===
Cumia announced on July 8, 2014, that he would launch a new Internet-based podcast as The Anthony Cumia Show, which began airing in August 2014. This show was kept separate from his old internet radio show Live from the Compound, which Anthony had set up as a hobby, unrelated to his future show in the same studio.

Beginning in August 2014 the show aired exclusively from Cumia's basement studio where he hosted his previous show, Live from the Compound.

In 2015, Cumia and his producers announced that they were looking into setting up a studio in New York City in order to secure more guests to appear on the program. Starting in August 2015, the show began broadcasting from a second studio in midtown Manhattan. Cumia stated that this new location would be the primary studio going forward, with some broadcasts from the original Long Island studio on special occasions.

On March 30, 2016 Cumia announced that he would be spending the month of April in drug and alcohol rehab. He announced that while in rehab he would have a group of comedians and friends fill in for his show.

During an appearance on Jim Norton and Sam Roberts on Sirius XM in July 2017, it was stated that a co-host for the show had been found and will be announced in the following month. On August 21, 2017, Cumia revealed comedian and actor Artie Lange as the co-host of The Artie and Anthony Show. It launched on September 5, 2017, airing Monday to Thursday, from 4–6 p.m. In May 2018, it was announced that due to his health and legal issues, Lange would be taking an indefinite hiatus from the show, and it would revert to the name The Anthony Cumia Show, with fill-in co-host Dave Landau as the new co-host.

In March 2021, Landau left the show to join Louder with Crowder.

In September 2021, Cumia announced on his show that he and his family will be permanently moving from New York State to an area near Greenville, South Carolina. He further stated that the Manhattan-based Compound Media studios would remain for the other hosts on the network, and that he would be building a brand new studio for The Anthony Cumia Show upon his relocation South Carolina.

In June 2024, Cumia announced that the Compound Media studios were closing, and that he was merging his network and The Anthony Cumia Show with Gavin McInnes' Censored.TV network, with the merger leading to renaming of Censored.TV to Compound Censored, a portmanteau of the respective previous titles.

=== WABC ===
On March 9, 2025, Cumia began hosting a weekly radio version of The Anthony Cumia Show on WABC's Talkradio 77.

== Format ==
The show features Cumia commenting on pop-culture, politics, video games, and events regarding his personal life. Cumia, before switching the show to the NYC studio, would often conducts interviews with guests at his poker table, pool, or bar. Guests have included Cumia's former Opie and Anthony co-host Jim Norton, Alex Jones, Neil Degrasse Tyson, Chris Hansen, Ari Shaffir, Dan Soder, Jay Oakerson, Ron Bennington, John Melendez, Stacey Prussman, Nick DiPaolo and Colin Quinn. Archives of the show are available on-demand.

Cumia is joined by Gavin McInnes on Wednesdays, a spin-off under the alternative portmanteau Compound Censored, a play off of both Cumia's network and McInnes' streaming media platform Censored.TV, on which the Wednesday show is also broadcast.
