= Vinnie Brand =

American Stand-Up Comedian from New Jersey

- Born: July 6, 1963 (age 63); Middletown, New Jersey, U.S.
- Education: Rutgers University, New Brunswick (attended)
- Notable work: The Stress Factory; Tough Crowd with Colin Quinn; Last Comic Standing; The Opie and Anthony Show; NickMom Night Out
- Political party: Republican
- Children: 6

Comedy career
- Medium: Stand-up
- Genre: Observational comedy

Vincent S. Brand III (born July 6, 1963) is an American stand-up comedian from Middletown, New Jersey. He is best known for being the owner of The Stress Factory Comedy Clubs located in New Brunswick, New Jersey and Bridgeport, Connecticut. Brand has also made television and radio appearances on shows, such as Tough Crowd with Colin Quinn, Last Comic Standing, The Rosie O'Donnell Show, The Opie and Anthony Show, NickMom, Night Out, and Restaurant Stakeout.

== Biography ==
Vinnie Brand was born and raised in Middletown, New Jersey. Brand attended Rutgers University, but did not graduate. After that, he opened up a flower shop and construction company. When both companies failed, Brand eventually found success in business when he opened Stress Factory Comedy Club in 1991. Throughout its business years, Stress Factory has featured comic headliners such as Drew Carey, Gilbert Gottfried, Richard Lewis, Chris Rock, and Andrew Dice Clay.

Brand has also performed at other comedy venues outside of his own club, including Comic Strip Live and Helium Comedy Club.

Along with the success of his comedy club, Brand has made various of television appearances including Tough Crowd with Colin Quinn, Last Comic Standing, Dave Attell: Road Work, Restaurant Stakeout, and NickMom Night Out.

He was a frequent radio guest on The Opie and Anthony Show.

Prior to folding in 2015, NickMom was in development for a "docu-comedy" starring Brand and his family, and had Jim Breuer credited as an executive producer for the project.
