= Paul Mecurio =

American comedian and lawyer

Paul Mecurio (born Paul Mercurio) is an American comedian, actor, writer and producer. Mecurio has dozens of TV and film appearances and has won an Emmy Award and a Peabody Award. Mecurio worked as an investment banker and mergers and acquisitions lawyer before he turned to stand-up comedy full time.

== Early life and career ==
Mecurio was born and raised in Providence, Rhode Island. During his childhood, he worked at his mother's furniture store with his two siblings.

Mecurio graduated from Providence College and from Georgetown University Law Center in Washington, D.C. He first started his career on Wall Street in New York City as a mergers and acquisitions lawyer at Willkie Farr & Gallagher, and later as an investment banker at Credit Suisse First Boston.

While working on Wall Street, Mecurio attended a private stand-up comedy show by comedian Jay Leno. Mecurio, a comedy fan who had written some jokes for himself, handed 15 pages of his own material to Leno with the hope of selling some for him to use on television. Leno contacted him and asked for more; Mecurio was paid $50 for his first joke which Leno used on the show.

Mecurio became a self-described "addict" to performing stand-up comedy. Shortly after doing stand-up as hobby while still on Wall Street, he had a seven-month absence from work to support his mother in Providence; after returning to New York, he resigned to focus on comedy. After struggling as a stand-up and becoming frustrated with the challenges of making a living, Mecurio returned to Wall Street investment banking, swearing off comedy and telling himself and his girlfriend that he would leave comedy for good. Seven months later, he began performing again.

Mecurio dropped the "r" from his surname to distinguish himself from Australian actor and dancer Paul Mercurio, who had joined the same entertainment union before him.

In 2003, Mecurio, along with a Virginia woman, pleaded guilty to disorderly conduct after his involvement in a "Sex for Sam" stunt held by The Opie and Anthony Show. Mecurio reported on a duo having simulated sex in a vestibule at St. Patrick's Cathedral, several feet away from a Mass service; he was arrested for acting in concert. The woman's partner died of a heart attack while awaiting trial.

== The Late Show with Stephen Colbert & The Daily Show with Jon Stewart ==
Paul is an Emmy and Peabody Award winning comedian for his work on "The Daily Show with Jon Stewart" and “The Late Show with Stephen Colbert.” He has made recurring appearances as a performer on “The Late Show,” other national shows, and his own comedy specials. Mecurio was also a featured as a performer on The Daily Show and in The Daily Show segment, "Second Opinion," in which he skewered the medical profession playing an HMO representative with a less than sympathetic mindset. Paul also did the audience warm ups for the show's in studio taping.

== Got No Game with Paul Mecurio (HBO) ==
Mecurio hosted, created, and was showrunner and executive producer for the HBO series Got No Game w/Paul Mecurio, a sports comedy show skewering the world of sports on and off the field.

== Sports Central (Comedy Central) ==
Mecurio hosted, co-created, and was showrunner and executive producer television pilot for Comedy Central's Sports Central, a sports comedy news show that he co-created and executive produced, and in which he starred.

== Paul Mecurio's Permission to Speak (Off Broadway) ==
Mecurio created, executive produced and starred in his one-man Off-Broadway show “Paul Mecurio’s Permission to Speak,” which was met with rave reviews and nominated for the prestigious “Best One-Man Show” Broadway Alliance Award. The show will be returning to Broadway.

== Other media ==
Mecurio has hosted his own shows for Comedy Central, HBO and CBS. He has appeared in his own Comedy Central and Showtime specials.

Mecurio is a frequent co-host on the science podcast StarTalk with Neil deGrasse Tyson.

Mecurio hosts the podcast "Inside Out w/Paul Mecurio” on iTunes, Spotify, iHeart, and Audioboom.
