= Opie and Anthony =

American radio show

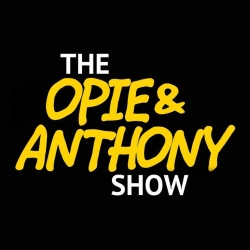
- Genre: Talk; comedy
- Running time: 3–5 hours
- Country of origin: United States
- Starring: Gregg Hughes; Anthony Cumia; Jim Norton (2001–2014)
- Produced by: Rick Del Gado (1998–2002); Ben Sparks (2004–2006); Steve Carlesi (2007–2010)
- Original release: March 1995 – July 1, 2014
- Opening theme: "The Ecstasy of Gold" by Ennio Morricone "Street Fighting Man" by Rage Against the Machine

Opie and Anthony was an American radio show hosted by Gregg "Opie" Hughes and Anthony Cumia that aired from March 1995 to July 2014, with comedian Jim Norton serving as third mic from 2001. The show originated in 1994 when Cumia took part in a song parody contest on Hughes' nighttime show on WBAB on Long Island, New York. After subsequent appearances, Cumia decided to pursue a radio career and teamed with Hughes to host their own show.

The show began with a three-year stint in afternoons at WAAF in Boston. In 1998, after an April Fools' Day prank led to their firing, Hughes and Cumia relocated to afternoons at WNEW in New York City. They gradually reduced the amount of music and adopted a talk format, incorporating "shock jock" humor and regular appearances by stand-up comedians. The show became the highest rated afternoon show in New York City, and was nationally syndicated from 2001 to a peak of 17 stations. In August 2002, the show was cancelled for a controversial incident during their annual Sex for Sam contest. Infinity Broadcasting kept the hosts off the air for two years, preventing them from being hired elsewhere.

In October 2004, Opie and Anthony returned to the air in mornings on the uncensored subscription-based XM Satellite Radio from New York City. From April 2006 to March 2009, the first half of the show was simulcast on as many as 24 terrestrial radio stations owned by CBS Radio and Citadel Broadcasting. On July 3, 2014, the show abruptly ended after SiriusXM fired Cumia for posting remarks on social media about a black woman who assaulted him. Cumia started his own show, The Anthony Cumia Show, and Hughes and Norton remained at SiriusXM and hosted Opie with Jim Norton until 2016, when the pair split to pursue their own shows. In 2017, Hughes was fired from SiriusXM for filming an employee as he defecated.

== History ==
=== 1994–1995: Origins and WBAB Long Island ===
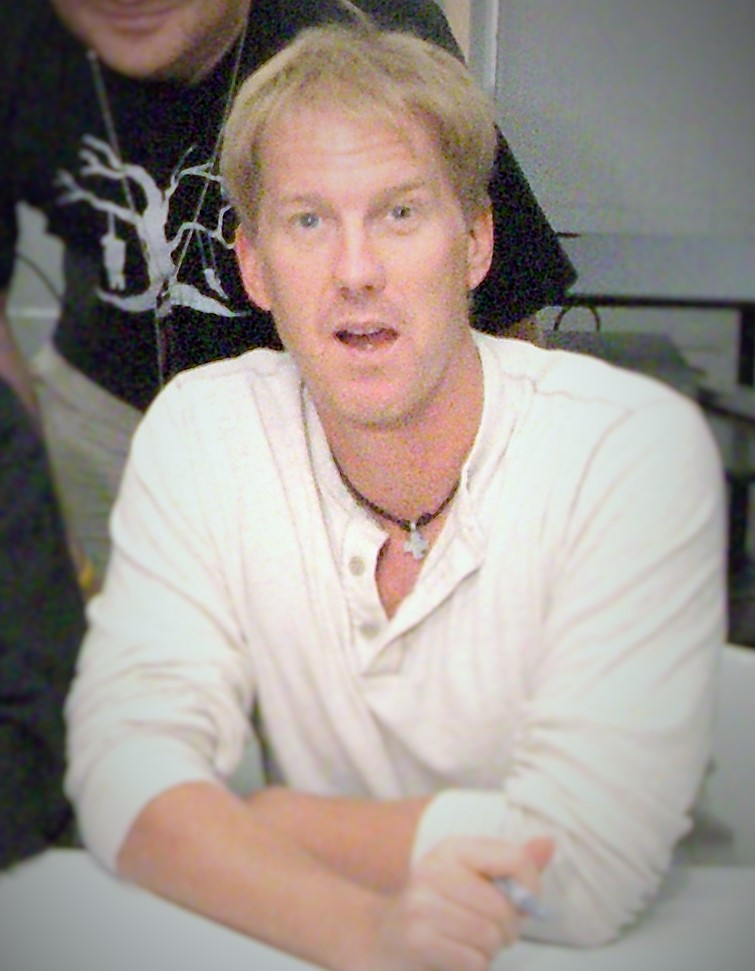
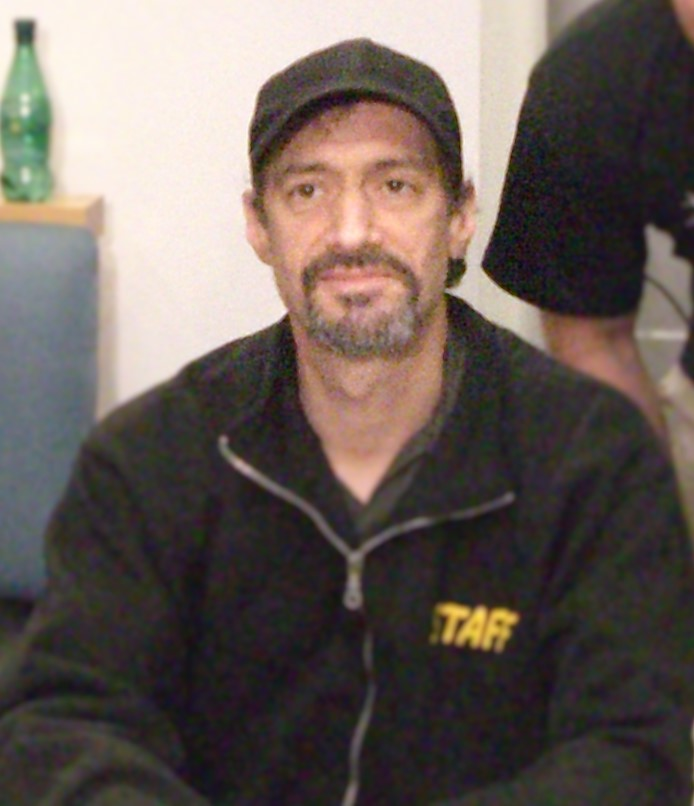
Hosts Gregg "Opie" Hughes and Anthony Cumia in 2007

In mid-1994, Gregg "Opie" Hughes was the host of The Nighttime Attitude, a late night music radio show on WBAB on Long Island, New York. In an effort to capitalize on the extensive media coverage of the murder trial of O. J. Simpson, Hughes held a song parody contest for listeners to submit entries based on the trial. Among the thirty or so submissions that he received, one of them was "Gonna Electric Shock O. J." to the tune of "(Sittin' On) The Dock of the Bay" by Otis Redding, performed by Rotgut, a local band featuring Anthony Cumia, a construction worker, on vocals and his brother Joe. The latter travelled to the station while Hughes was doing his show to submit a cassette tape of the parody, and only allowed Hughes to take it. The parody became a hit with the audience, who asked for the song to be played each night. As a result, Hughes invited the Cumias to perform the song live in the studio in September 1994. Recalled Hughes, "Ant and I instantly had each other the rest of the show. I was like, 'Holy shit, dude. That went pretty well. Why don't you come in next week?' Slowly but surely, he started coming in every week". Using the little funds available at the radio station, Hughes secured a small budget for Cumia to be paid for his appearances, though to Cumia, the money was not an issue as he "just wanted to get a foot in the door" in radio.

I knew Ant had talent the first day I met him. I couldn't fathom that he wasn't in radio or doing anything in the entertainment field. It just amazed me.

— Hughes on his initial meeting with Cumia

After Cumia made several more appearances on Hughes' show, the two entered discussions to become a full-time radio team. Hughes had wished to evolve his show to "more than just me on the radio", and knew it could be achieved with Cumia's on-air personality. Cumia accepted, and Hughes pitched the idea to WBAB management with the intent of moving to the morning or afternoon slot, but it was declined. During this time Ron Valeri, the program director at rock station WAAF in Boston, Massachusetts, went to Long Island to visit family and heard the two on the air. He called Hughes and offered them a spot on WAAF. Hughes then assembled an aircheck from tapes of their first shows together, and sent them to WAAF and another station in Dallas, Texas. Both stations wished to hire the duo, which led to their departure at WBAB. WAAF general manager Bruce Mittman recalled that he "almost drove off the road laughing" from listening to them, and subsequently hired them to take over afternoons from Liz Wilde. Before they left WBAB, the station offered Cumia to take over Hughes' night shift, which the two later saw as "a scumbag move" as their bits (excerpts) were being played on the morning show without their permission. Hughes was cautious about moving as he felt unsure if the show's success would translate to a new radio market. Cumia ended his manual labor job, and threw his construction tools out of his car window while driving in hope of never returning to it.

=== 1995–1998: WAAF Boston ===
Hughes and Cumia launched their new weekday afternoon show, Opie and Anthony, at WAAF in March 1995. To their surprise, Valeri left the station soon after their arrival, and the duo came to disagreements over their show with the new program director, Dave Douglas. Cumia recalled the desire to ignore the rules and advice from management and began to play less music and talk more, which changed the dynamic of the show "within months". One of their most notable stunts during their time at WAAF was 100 Grand, a staged giveaway of $100,000 which was hyped on the air for several weeks. When it was time for the duo to give away the prize, the "winning" caller instead received a 100 Grand chocolate bar instead of the money. It was at WAAF where the show started its long running Whip 'em Out Wednesday segment that involves women flashing their breasts to drivers with a "WOW" sticker on their car. In June 1997, nine weeks into the promotion, the show was suspended for two weeks after Hughes and Cumia read out a confidential memo written by the station's management about the campaign on the air. Mittman put an end to the promotion after police contacted him over public safety surrounding it, but claimed the suspension was unrelated and over an "internal matter". In addition to their radio show, Hughes and Cumia hosted the television show Real Rock TV on WABU and released Demented World, a compilation album of their radio bits which was released in October 1997 and sold 40,000 copies. A late 1997 broadcast where Hughes threatened to punch WBCN personality Nik Carter and encouraged listeners to harass Carter was subject to a complaint and reviewed by the Federal Communications Commission (FCC), but no action was taken.

In April 1998, Hughes and Cumia were fired from WAAF following their April Fool's Day prank whereby Hughes and Cumia announced that Boston Mayor Thomas Menino had been killed in a car accident in Florida in the company of a Haitian female prostitute. The prank included reports from a fake police officer and news reporter, the latter a friend of Hughes. The stunt and firing received national attention from the press, and many listeners believed the story as Menino was on a flight during the prank, so he was out of contact while the event unfolded. Menino was made aware of the prank upon his arrival and responded with a letter of complaint to the FCC, pointing out the commission's broadcast regulations prohibit the broadcast of knowingly false information if it causes public harm. The FCC took no action against WAAF or Hughes and Cumia over the prank. The station's management suggested the duo have pies thrown at them in a stunt held at the city's square, but the idea was dismissed by the Mayor's office. After WAAF faced the possibility of its broadcasting license challenged for removal, the station fired Hughes and Cumia within a week after the prank, and suspended Mittman for one month and Douglas for one week.

Shortly after their firing, Hughes called the prank "a stupid bit", but both later admitted that the prank was done on purpose so they could leave the station after management offered them a disappointing raise in their salaries. In addition, the pair had hired Robert Eatman as their new agent and entered secret negotiations to move to New York City, the country's largest radio market, before going ahead with the prank. Hughes maintained he never intended to leave Boston, citing the city's growth as a radio market, the show's rise in the ratings, and plans to release a second radio album and enter a national syndication deal. The pair also had an offer to work at a station in Atlanta, Georgia which included a visit to the station, but they declined the offer.

=== 1998–2002: WNEW New York City ===
==== Rise in popularity and Norton's debut ====
After their firing from WAAF, Hughes recalled that he and Cumia became "a wanted commodity" as they received offers from one station in Atlanta, Georgia, and WXRK and WNEW in New York City. As WXRK was already the flagship station of the popular syndicated morning program The Howard Stern Show, they chose WNEW to make it easier for them to build an audience. They entered a deal with the station's newly hired program director Garry Wall, who wanted them for their talent and ability to attract ratings, which required a meeting with management Infinity Broadcasting, the owner of WNEW, in Washington, D.C.

On June 17, 1998, Hughes and Cumia had signed a three-year contract with Infinity Broadcasting, and Opie and Anthony began in afternoons from 3:00 p.m. to 7:00 p.m. later that month with Rick Del Gado assigned as their new producer. The show grew in popularity over the next two years to become a top-10 rated show. In June 1999, the hosts received a Radio and Records Achievement Award for Rock Air Personality of the Year. When WNEW switched radio formats from classic rock to talk in September 1999, the show held an on-air mock funeral to bury the records the station no longer played. The show then changed its starting times from 3:00 p.m. to 2:00 p.m.

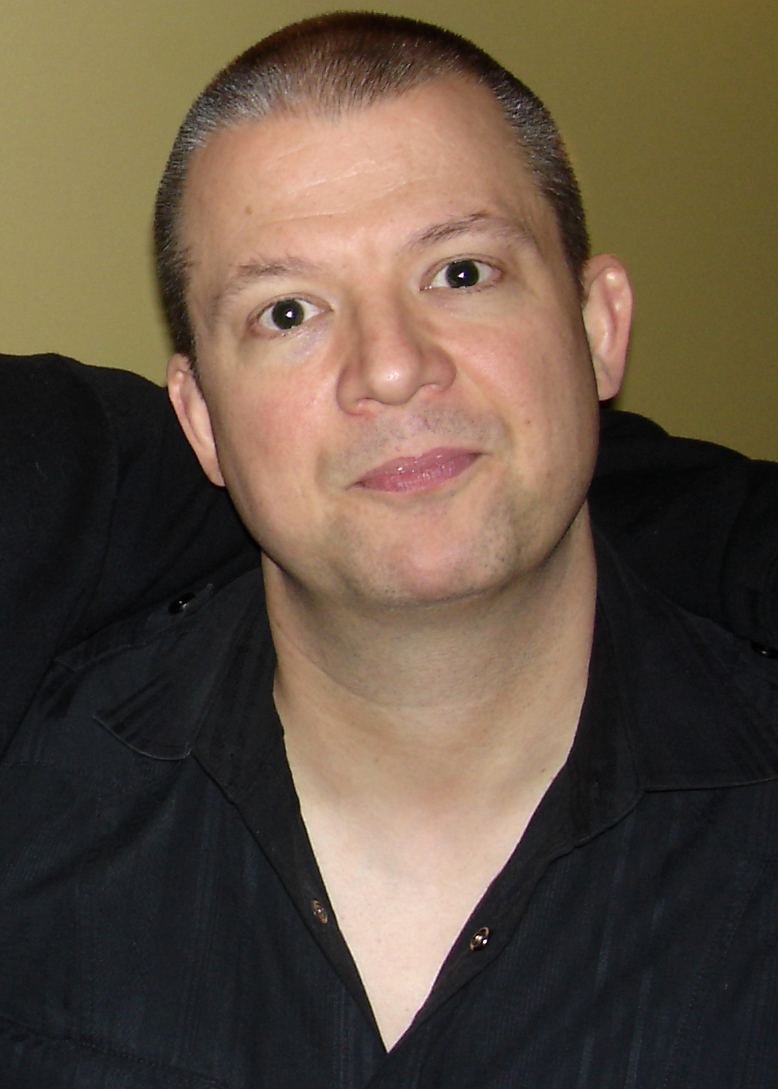
Show "third mic" Jim Norton made his debut appearance on Opie and Anthony in 2000.

December 1999 saw the show's first annual Homeless Shopping Spree, a segment that involved homeless people going on a shopping spree in a mall with money donated by listeners. The event was stopped by security, who had the twelve contestants removed from the building. Boston Mayor Thomas Menino declared the segment degraded and humiliated the contestants, and that it was immoral to hold such an event on the same day the city was to do a census count of the homeless townspeople. The 2008 edition of the spree was planned, but was shelved by lawyers who argued it could only take place if a mall gave permission.

Opie and Anthony continued to grow in 2000, receiving increased industry exposure and became a top rated show in the 18–34 male demographic. In January 2000, WNEW began to air a four-hour best of program, The Worst of Opie and Anthony, on Saturday mornings. Also that month, the show won an award for Best Evening Show at the annual Achievement in Radio Awards held in the New York City area. In November 2000, the show won a Radio Music Award for Air Personality of the Year Award in the alternative rock category.

It was at WNEW when Hughes and Cumia started to have stand-up comedians sit in on a regular basis, something that later became a defining feature of the show. They had tried it several times before, but found some comics tried to force their act on the air and not "hang out and talk". In 2000, comedian Jim Norton appeared on the show with Andrew Dice Clay, who had Norton open for him on his comedy tours. Norton had a good rapport with the hosts and the audience, and he soon began to sit in for three or four days a week before he was hired as third-mic full time. He helped bring in future regulars on the show, including comedians Rich Vos, Patrice O'Neal, Robert Kelly, and Keith Robinson. Norton credits the radio show with boosting his career: "They already have a great show without me. I know that. I'm not like a third partner or anything, I just fire some lines in here and there". On November 30, 2000, fifteen people, including Norton, Del Gado, and comedian Lewis Black, were arrested and charged with disorderly conduct during an on-air segment on board the Voyeur Bus, a glass-enclosed bus that transported topless women around New York City.

==== Stern feud, XFL show, and syndication ====
In July 2000, Howard Stern, the morning host at Infinity's WXRK, got the company to issue a gag order on their other personalities, preventing them, including Hughes and Cumia, from talking about Stern or other Infinity hosts. Three months earlier, Stern threatened management with his resignation if they did not go through with his request, after Hughes and Cumia blew the news of a surprise rock concert that Stern was to announce the following morning. Stern called Hughes and Cumia "imitators" who were "dying to get some attention from me". In 2004, Hughes revealed a stipulation that would have fined Cumia and himself $100,000 if they talked about other Infinity radio personalities. When the pair renewed their contracts with Infinity in 2001, they added a clause that allowed them to talk about Stern. In 2006, Stern admitted to the gag order: "When I'm in business with a company and they hire Howard Stern imitators to go on in the afternoon... I don't want anyone knocking me ... I turned to Mel Karmazin ... 'Your two boys that you hired, who sound identical to me ... they're gonna go insane. Watch.'" Hughes and Cumia claim the feud was started by Stern, adding that he "saw there was potential for 'The Opie & Anthony Show' to get an audience and perceived it as some kind of threat."

In February 2001, Hughes and Cumia began to host XFL Gameday, the pre-game show for Vince McMahon's startup American football league, the XFL, produced by NBC and aired in New York City. The show, taped weekly at WWF New York in Times Square, featured analysis by sportscaster Bruce Beck and football coach Rusty Tillman and risque content; one such segment featured Hughes and Cumia as chefs inserting a cucumber in between two melons. The show was cancelled after four weeks; McMahon stated that he had no creative control, adding: "I heard it was horrible. Had I seen it, I would have shut it down."

By mid-2001, Opie and Anthony ranked first place in New York City in the 18-plus demographic in afternoons and number two overall. Among their success came the announcement in June 2001, following what Hughes described as a "tug of war" period of discussions with Infinity and competing radio network Greater Media, the hosts renewed their contracts with Infinity to continue on WNEW. The media reported the pair were paid a total of $30 million for three years. As part of their deal, Infinity agreed to have the show nationally syndicated via Westwood One to as many as 22 of its stations. By the end of July 2001, the show was broadcast to nine cities, and returned to Boston in August on WBCN, a long time rival of their former station WAAF. By mid-August 2002, the number of affiliates had risen to 17. Infinity took the show and the afternoon drive team of Don & Mike from WJFK-FM in Washington, D.C., off the air for two days in May 2002 following comments from both shows about their feud.

==== FCC fines, Sex for Sam 3 incident, and cancellation ====
In June 2002, the FCC issued a $21,000 fine to Infinity broadcasting for the broadcast of content from Opie and Anthony it deemed in breach of its indecency regulations, following listener complaints. The cited segments included the November 15, 2000 airing of "Teen Week", a song that detailed incestual sex between a father and daughter, a November 16, 2000 segment of "Guess What's in My Pants" which involved a sexual discussion with a seventeen-year-old female, and a song parody played on January 8, 2001, titled "I'm Horny for Little Girls". Although a transcript or recording of the segments cited were not submitted to the FCC for review, the agency still issued the fine.

On July 13, 2002, Hughes, Cumia and Norton hosted the T&A with O&A beach party in Angola, New York attended by an estimated 5,000 people. The event featured stripping contests, a volleyball tournament among nightclub dancers, which developed into "a rowdy event combining full nudity and lewd acts with foreign objects". The event was investigated by the police, who arrested drunk drivers and attendees for disorderly conduct.

On August 22, 2002, the show was suspended following its third annual Sex for Sam contest held on August 15 that encouraged listeners to have sex in risky places for prizes while a witness reported from the location. Its name derived from the Boston Beer Company, producer of Samuel Adams beer that sponsored the contest and prize. In the segment, comedian Paul Mecurio, on a cellphone, described Brian Florence and Loretta Harper, a Virginia couple visiting Manhattan, having simulated sex in a vestibule at St. Patrick's Cathedral, several feet away from a Mass service. The couple were arrested for public lewdness, and Mecurio for acting in concert. The incident received widespread media attention, causing WNEW to issue an apology the following day, but it was rejected by the Catholic League that wrote to the FCC demanding Hughes and Cumia be fined and the removal of WNEW's license. The Boston Beer Company also apologized. The show aired live on the following day, but the hosts could not address the incident for legal reasons. WNEW aired a week of reruns while Infinity kept Hughes and Cumia off the air while the matter was reviewed. They were fired on August 22, in addition to WNEW's general manager and program director the day before. Florence died from a heart attack in September 2003 and Harper and Mecurio pleaded guilty to disorderly conduct in 2003.

The incident attracted 523 e-mail complaints sent to the FCC which launched an investigation. In October 2003, Infinity received a $357,500 fine which marked the first time a fine was totalled by issuing $27,500 for each station that aired the offending content and not the station cited in a complaint. As a result, the Catholic League dropped its bid to rescind WNEW's license. Infinity appealed both fines issued in 2002 until Viacom, its parent company, agreed to a $3.5 million settlement in 2004 which cancelled all pending indecency violations against the broadcaster.

Following their firing, Infinity competitor Clear Channel Communications wished to hire Hughes and Cumia to host mornings on one of their stations. However, rather than release the pair from their contract, Infinity continued to pay them until their deals expired in June 2004 to prevent them broadcasting on another network. Despite their efforts to get out of their contracts, Hughes and Cumia remained off the air for two years, remaining largely out of the public eye apart from odd appearances. Both found the hiatus frustrating as they wished to broadcast and comment on the news and current events but had no outlet or an audience. In November 2002, the pair published an open letter to their fans on their website, vowing their return to the air. In January 2003, the show's remaining support staff were fired from WNEW, and the station switched formats from talk to music. In June, Hughes and Cumia were spotted visiting the offices of Sirius Satellite Radio for a meeting with their agent. Hughes later claimed the WNEW years as the show's "golden age".

=== 2004–2014: XM Satellite Radio ===
==== Return to air and Homeless Charlie incident ====
On May 31, 2004, Hughes and Cumia's contracts with Infinity Broadcasting expired, making them free agents. On August 5, the pair announced their deal with XM Satellite Radio, a subscription-based satellite radio service exempt from the broadcasting regulations imposed by the FCC. The show began on October 4 from 6:00 a.m. on weekdays from a studio in the Steinway Building in New York City. The pair had wished to return to mornings at WNEW, but they were prevented from doing so as management did not want them competing with Stern. They later claimed that XM CEO Hugh Panero had signed them despite openly admitting his dislike for them in a meeting, but he understood they could attract subscribers. Before their start on XM, Hughes, Cumia and Norton completed a media tour, visiting several radio markets to promote their return to the air. Initially, the show was offered to XM subscribers on High Voltage, a premium channel at an additional $1.99 a month. From April 2, 2005, the channel became a part of the standard XM subscription. In August 2005, the show became available on-line through a subscription to Audible.com.

Shortly into their tenure at XM, they held Assault on the Media promotions led by the Pests, a group of fans of the show that helped to give the show additional exposure. One such incident took place on May 19, 2005, when show intern Nathaniel disrupted a news report by then-WCBS-TV reporter Arthur Chi'en on live television, making risque gestures while holding an Opie and Anthony sign, which caused Chi'en to shout "What the fuck is your problem, man?" on the air. Chi'en made a live apology, but was fired a few hours later. The incident brought the show nationwide press. Hughes and Cumia announced the campaign's end in December 2005, after a fan disrupted a live report by then-WABC-TV reporter Anthony Johnson with an air horn and a show sign. The two claimed the campaign had gone too far, and had run its course.

On April 17, 2006, DirecTV ceased airing the High Voltage channel, citing its decision to steer its XM channels towards more commercial free music. However, the channel returned to the service on April 26 due to popular demand from listeners. In November 2006, the High Voltage channel was renamed The ViRus as per Hughes and Cumia's long time request to have it changed.

On May 15, 2007, XM suspended Opie and Anthony for thirty days in response to a May 9 broadcast featuring a homeless man, dubbed "Homeless Charlie", who talked about raping Condoleezza Rice, Laura Bush and Queen Elizabeth II. The one-minute segment went unnoticed until Drudge Report posted the audio online. Hughes and Cumia issued an apology at the start of the following broadcast. During the May 14 show, the hosts discussed the incident further which led to XM ordering their suspension. The show continued to air on terrestrial radio. Early reports that the hosts may have been fired caused some listeners to cancel their XM subscriptions, and XM responded by offering a free month of service to those who complained about the suspension. Some of the show's sponsors pulled their advertising in protest. The show returned to XM on June 15, 2007. The hosts later believed that the developing merger between XM and Sirius Satellite Radio at the time played a role, as management were trying to get government officials on their side and needed to show some responsibility.

Later in 2007, XM used revenue generated from the show to renovate the studio, which Hughes and Cumia helped to design. The new facility was split into two areas, one being a large roundtable with a typical console and the other had sofas and chairs for a lounge atmosphere. The desk was equipped with 12 flat screen televisions and six webcams for listeners to watch the show live on Paltalk.

==== Terrestrial radio simulcast ====
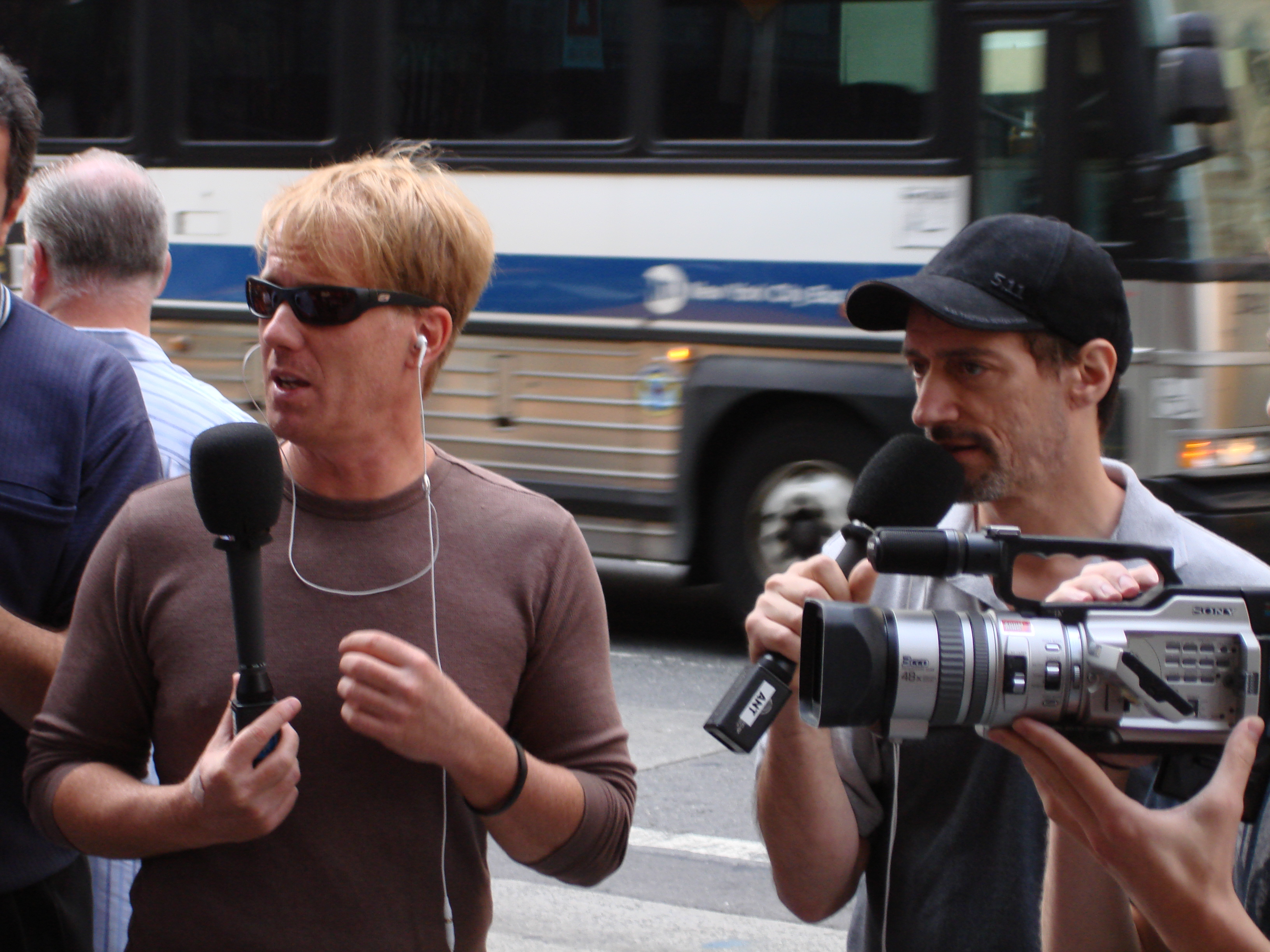
Opie and Anthony walking to their XM studio from CBS Radio in New York City on July 25, 2006.

On April 24, 2006, Hughes and Cumia announced their deal with CBS Radio, formerly Infinity Broadcasting, to have part of their show simulcast on seven CBS terrestrial radio stations nationwide from April 26. The decision came after The David Lee Roth Show was cancelled four months after its launch as it failed to attract an audience for CBS following Stern's departure from WXRK for Sirius Satellite Radio. CBS agreed to pay XM a license fee to carry the program and allowed XM's advertisements to air on its stations. From 6:00 a.m. to 9:00 a.m., the show aired on WFNY, formerly WXRK, that was compliant with FCC regulations but uncensored for XM listeners. From 9:00 a.m. Hughes and Cumia continued the show from XM. As XM and CBS could not agree to have the show broadcast from a single studio, the hosts had to walk two blocks during breaks in the program to continue broadcasting. For a period they also had microphones to broadcast live during the walk which became known as "The Walkover". As part of their deal, CBS allowed the duo to own their old WNEW broadcasts.

The show's initial ratings were promising; in May 2006, Opie and Anthony gained a 4.2% market share in the 18–34 demographic in New York City, about one-third of what Stern drew in the same market and demographic prior to his departure. In Philadelphia and Boston, the show attracted shares of 7.7% and 6.7% in the same demographic, respectively, although their share of total listening audience was lower. In July 2006, Citadel Broadcasting announced it would simulcast the show on nine terrestrial radio stations nationwide, increasing the number of affiliates to 20. In September 2006, the number of stations rose to 24.

In October 2007, their share of the 18–34 demographic in New York City slipped, ranking second in the mornings overall with a 2.1% share. In the same month, following insufficient ratings, WYSP in Philadelphia dropped the show in favor of a rock music format. Following the introduction of the portable people meter ratings system in 2008, Opie and Anthony failed to reach top 10 in morning drive in New York City, with WXRK ranked 20th out of 24 stations overall and fell outside the top 10 in the coveted 25–54 demographic. On December 1, 2008, the show was dropped on WBCN in Boston and WKRK-FM in Cleveland. Following the broadcast on March 9, 2009, the show was dropped from WXRK and the station switched to a Top 40 format. The producer for the FM portion, Mike "Stuntbrain" Opelka, was fired the following day.

==== Final years ====
In April 2009, the show relocated from the Steinway building to the SiriusXM studios at the McGraw-Hill Building. In the first week of October 2010, Hughes and Cumia renewed their contract with SiriusXM to continue their radio show for an additional two years. They expressed disappointment with their new deal; Hughes described it as "mediocre", noting the company "got all their points, we got nothing".

During an appearance on June 8, 2011, Andrew Breitbart showed Hughes and Cumia a photograph of what he claimed to be Anthony Weiner's nude genitalia. One of the Paltalk cameras in the room caught his cell phone's display, and the hosts subsequently leaked the photo by publishing it on Twitter. Breitbart stated that the photo was published without his permission, and later told KFI radio, "These people have admitted that they did this surreptitiously and illicitly and they lied in the process saying that they didn't even have a camera in the place." Weiner's spokesperson issued the following statement: "As Representative Weiner said on Monday when he took responsibility for his actions, he has sent explicit photos."

On October 13, 2011, The ViRUS was relaunched as The Opie and Anthony Channel. The pair renewed their contracts in October 2012. In April 2014, Hughes, Cumia, and Norton celebrated the show's twentieth anniversary with a special live edition of Ron Bennington's radio show Unmasked, at Carolines on Broadway comedy club.

In August 2013, footage of a 2006 segment that involved Hughes stomping on a cake belonging to a homeless man went viral. The segment occurred during The Walkover whereby the man, known as Homeless Andrew, had fished out a stale cake from a dumpster which Hughes proceeded to stamp on. The video was posted on Reddit which attracted widespread criticism, after which Hughes uploaded the video to YouTube with an explanation of the incident. He pointed out that he did it to see Cumia and Norton "cringe and get uncomfortable", and that he gave $100 to Homeless Andrew, "and everyone else gave him at least another $100. Now you know the story."

On July 3, 2014, two days after the show started a vacation, SiriusXM fired Cumia for posting "racially-charged and hate-filled remarks" on Twitter. It followed an incident with a black woman on the street, whereby Cumia was allegedly punched by her after he attempted to take a picture in Times Square. He referred to her as, among other things, a "savage, violent animal". Cumia refused to apologize for his tweets, and gave his blessing for Hughes and Norton to continue broadcasting as their contracts with Sirius remained intact. Cumia deleted the tweets after being fired.

=== Aftermath ===
On July 14, 2014, Hughes and Norton returned to the air under a new title, Opie with Jim Norton, and the channel was renamed SiriusXM Talk, before it changed once more to Opie Radio. In the following month, Cumia launched his own show, The Anthony Cumia Show, on his own subscription-based service Compound Media. In October 2016, growing differences between Hughes and Norton led to Hughes moving to afternoons with The Opie Radio Show and Norton staying in mornings to host Jim Norton & Sam Roberts with former Opie and Anthony producer Sam Roberts. On July 6, 2017, Hughes was fired from SiriusXM over an alleged incident where he filmed a colleague using the bathroom.

In April 2015, Hughes and Cumia were involved in a public feud on Twitter regarding their growing strained relationship over the years, and both addressed their differences on their respective shows. Later that month Hughes, Cumia, and Norton agreed to separate interviews for Newsweek, which revealed that the hosts had not been on friendly terms since 1999, and spats over their former relationships and contract negotiations. Cumia said he had growing resentment towards Hughes for not doing more to save his job, after he learned that Hughes did not threaten to quit while negotiating a new contract with SiriusXM to keep him on board. Hughes felt the pair were no longer on the same page, and told Cumia that management were in favor of his new show with Norton, which Cumia took as a personal insult. In October 2016, during Hughes's first day on his new afternoon show, he and Cumia spoke for the first time in over two years in a phone call that aired live during their respective shows. Several on-air calls followed.

In January 2018, Cumia offered $5,000 to anyone who could shut down a Reddit message board dedicated to the show. He claimed that members of the forum had constantly harassed him, his friends and family, and former guests on the radio show.

In March 2021, the show gained attention when video of a Paris Hilton appearance from 2011 went viral. The footage showed an uncomfortable Hilton unwilling to answer questions and leaving the studio, feeling she was wasting time being "berated" by the hosts. After the appearance Norton said Hilton was "a spoiled human being" and had "bit [his] tongue for the better half of the interview." In 2023, the show was featured on the Vice TV docuseries Dark Side of the 2000s in an episode about Stern's rise in popularity and his rivalry with Opie and Anthony.

In March 2025, Cumia returned to terrestrial radio for the first time since 2009, hosting The Anthony Cumia Show on WABC-AM in New York City.

On July 27, 2026, Cumia and Norton announced their new podcast, the Anthony and Jim Show, with plans to post episodes every other week to YouTube, with Patreon exclusive episodes on the weeks in-between. The first episode premiered on YouTube August 4, 2026.

== Content ==
Opie and Anthony combined humor with commentary on American sociopolitical and popular culture. Some categorized them as shock jocks, despite their disagreement with the term. Cumia was known for his impressions of various celebrities while Hughes was the one who steered the program and operated the control board, feeding ideas. The show was often described as a "hang" or a place for "regular guys to hang out". It was at WNEW and on XM where the show was known for its cringe style of humor, which the Times Herald-Record described as material that "aimed to make you laugh while simultaneously feeling really uncomfortable", as exemplified by guests being verbally lambasted, awkward situations, self ridicule, and roast style comedy. In 2001, New York Magazine described the show "as a cultural nightmare of sexism, racism, and homophobia", which Cumia defended as dark humor. "Sometimes we find things that are wrong funny. Sometimes we find tragedy funny, and that's the way we've always been." Talkers Magazine editor Michael Harrison said Hughes and Cumia "do lowbrow radio in a very professional manner".

=== Comedians ===
The show became known for the frequent appearances by stand-up comedians who would sit in on the show. Initially Hughes and Cumia disliked having them on as it presented a "fake environment", but Hughes credited Norton's arrival in 2000 as a turning point in the show's evolution. While at WNEW the show's regular comedians included Rich Vos, Colin Quinn, Patrice O'Neal, Brian Regan, Otto & George, and Paul Mecurio. At XM this expanded to Robert Kelly, Joe Rogan, Bill Burr, Jay Mohr, Louis C.K., Dave Attell, Joe DeRosa, Doug Stanhope, Nick Di Paolo, Marc Maron, Bob Saget, Kevin Smith, Jim Jefferies, and Bonnie McFarlane. Kelly praised the hosts in allowing comics to be themselves, and Burr noted "a lot of sharp really smart observational humor" on the show.

Rogan has cited the open discussion style of Opie and Anthony, and the live Ustream show that Cumia did from his basement, Live from the Compound, as a particular influence for his own podcast The Joe Rogan Experience.

=== The Pests ===
The Pests (originally known as the O&A Army) were a group of listeners who took a proactive approach to the show's content and promotion. They are jokingly known by the hosts as a collection of "computer nerds" and "failures", with the implicit recognition that these devotees relate well to the hosts themselves. In 2006, Forbes recognized the Pests as a source of viral marketing for the show, facetiously suggesting that Cumia be nominated as CMO of XM for his role in encouraging and leading the Pests. The group came into early prominence when the show aired from WNEW, where fans posted on rival chat rooms and message boards or disruptively calling into rival radio stations. At XM, however, the Pests took their efforts to another level, with some assigning themselves titles (i.e. "General") to coordinate their efforts, and adopting tactics reminiscent of flash mobs.

In 2005 the show ran Assault on the Media, a contest encouraging listeners to pester a live broadcast in some way to promote the radio show. Typically this involved large signs with the show's logo with Pests shouting show phrases "Opie and Anthony!" or "O&A Party Rock!". A notable incident involved WCBS-TV reporter Arthur Chi'en, when show intern Nathaniel Bryan approached him during a live report holding up a poster for the show. Bryan and another man, later identified as Crazy Cabbie, made gestures at the camera and repeated the show's name. When Chi'en finished his introduction, he loudly asked Bryan, "What the fuck is your problem, man?", which went out live over the air. Chi'en apologized, but was fired later that day. In December 2005, a fan sounded an air horn during a remote report in New Jersey. Ocean Township police questioned the man, who faced a possible assault charge if WABC-TV reporter Anthony Johnson suffered hearing damage. Johnson filed a lawsuit in 2007, alleging that his hearing had been permanently damaged in the incident, listing the fan, the two hosts, and XM in his claim. Acting Governor Richard J. Codey addressed the seriousness of the situation in a statement, which prompted Hughes and Cumia to end the contest.

Between 2004 and 2006, the Pests appeared at several gatherings organized by Howard Stern. In November 2004, a group held large "O&A" signs during his rally to promote XM's rival service Sirius Satellite Radio. In 2005 and 2006, the Pests coordinated an attack on Stern's appearance on the Late Show with David Letterman, holding up large signs and banners while shouting chants upon Stern's arrival. Later in 2005, the Pests organized the Million Pest March to protest Stern's rally celebrating his final terrestrial radio broadcast, arriving with large signs but were denied entry to the cordoned-off area by the police. A handful of Pests did make it through, but were promptly removed from the crowd upon revealing their signs and banners. When Stern moved the broadcast to the Hard Rock Cafe, some Pests performed a funeral dirge for Stern's career, carrying a makeshift coffin made of cardboard through the crowd.

In 2006, the Pests were involved in the show's feuds with Scott Ferrall and Whoopi Goldberg, calling into the respective shows. Goldberg made a surprise visit to the show which led to a truce in the Pest onslaught. In 2007, two Pests held signs attacking Tyra Banks.

=== Jocktober ===
In 2008, the show began an annual segment named Jocktober, where clips from other radio shows across the country were mocked and criticised during the month of October, particularly those of the morning zoo format in small radio markets. Early editions saw Opie and Anthony listeners and Pests used social media for mischief, for example posting shocking or pornographic messages on the radio station's Facebook page or by e-mail, and calling into the station in droves. On some editions, Hughes and Cumia mocked past segments from their own show. The final Jocktober segments aired in 2014.

== Other enterprises ==
=== Demented World ===
The duo released a compilation of segments from the show that aired on WAAF on a CD entitled Demented World in November 1997.

=== Opie and Anthony Traveling Virus ===
The Traveling Virus was a comedy tour headlined by Hughes and Cumia, as well as friends of the show, that began in 2006. In its first year, it spanned several locations in the eastern United States during the summer. In 2007, it visited eight cities through the spring and summer. It was an event they had discussed for many years, but were never able to bring it to fruition until they made their 2006 deal with CBS radio. The 2008 tour was cancelled in favor of one show, held at the PNC Bank Arts Center in Holmdel, New Jersey on August 2.

=== Search and Destroy ===
On the morning of March 26, 2008, Opie and Anthony revealed they had taped a pilot for Comedy Central. The show was titled Search & Destroy and features teams of comedians performing various tasks throughout New York City. Opie and Anthony believe that it may have been too graphic even for cable television. Although Opie and Anthony considered the pilot a success, Comedy Central did not pick the show up.

== Other appearances ==
Through the show's friendship with Lazlow Jones, the hosts as well as show staff have appeared in several Rockstar Games releases including Grand Theft Auto: Liberty City Stories, Grand Theft Auto IV and Red Dead Redemption.
