= Todd Lynn =

American stand-up comedian and actor

- Born: March 19, 1964
- Died: January 27, 2012 (aged 47); Mississippi, United States
- Education: Central State University, Xavier University
- Occupations: stand-up comedian and actor
- Known for: performing in comedy clubs, TV shows
- Notable work: Comedy Central Presents special

Todd Lynn (March 19, 1964 – January 27, 2012) was an American stand-up comedian and actor.

== Career ==
Lynn performed in comedy clubs across the U.S. In 2002, he appeared as a panelist on the Comedy Central show, Tough Crowd with Colin Quinn. He also had his own Comedy Central Presents special, in 2005. Lynn performed on Late Night with Conan O'Brien, Jimmy Kimmel Live!, and Late Show with David Letterman. Additionally, he had a recurring role on the sitcom, My Wife and Kids.

== Personal life ==
Lynn had a bachelor's degree in communications from Central State University, and a master's degree in communications from Xavier University. Lynn struggled with numerous health problems throughout his life. He had a disfigured left arm and suffered from pancreatic cancer. He also began to go blind due to diabetes, and in the year prior to his death he battled heart and kidney failure. On January 27, 2012, Lynn suffered two strokes and a heart attack, and died in Mississippi.
