= The Stress Factory =

Comedy club chain

Coordinates: 40.496003°N 74.443407°W

The Stress Factory is a stand-up comedy club chain owned by comedian Vinnie Brand. The clubs are in New Brunswick, New Jersey, Bridgeport, Connecticut, and Valley Forge, Pennsylvania.

== Incidents ==
=== Greg Giraldo's final performance ===
On September 24, 2010, Greg Giraldo performed his last comedy stand-up routine at the New Brunswick club, and was scheduled to perform the following Saturday and Sunday as well. However, the next day, Giraldo overdosed on prescription pills in his New Jersey hotel room, and then was replaced by Kevin Brennan for all the other shows. Giraldo eventually died on September 29, 2010, as a result of the overdose. Although there are over 700 videos of recorded past events and shows from the Stress Factory on YouTube, the Stress Factory had removed any footage of Greg Giraldo's previous shows that happened before the incident. On October 3, 2010, TMZ.com posted a video on their web site of his final performance at the Stress Factory.

=== Pete Davidson walkout ===
On April 29, 2019, Saturday Night Live comedian Pete Davidson walked out of a scheduled performance for the Bridgeport club after Davidson claimed the owner, Vinnie Brand, "disrespected" him for mentioning Ariana Grande and Kate Beckinsale on stage before his scheduled time slot. However, Brand claimed that he was only accommodating what Davidson's security guard told him to do by telling the audience to not call out those names while Davidson would have been on stage.

=== Technical difficulties during Eddie Griffin performance ===
On August 30, 2019, comedian Eddie Griffin was scheduled to perform at the New Brunswick location. However, as Griffin took the stage, the club's circuit breaker went down causing the lighting and microphones to not work during his set. Griffin became so frustrated with the technical malfunctions that he accused the owner, Vinnie Brand, and the venue's management of racism. Brand reportedly dismissed those claims. Griffin was also scheduled to perform the following night, August 31, 2019, but cancelled the performances due to the technical difficulties even though Brand stated the circuit breaker would be fixed in time. Comedian Drew Fraser became the replacement for the Saturday shows and the patrons for Griffin's shows had their ticket money refunded.
