= Nick Di Paolo =

American comedian, writer, actor and radio personality

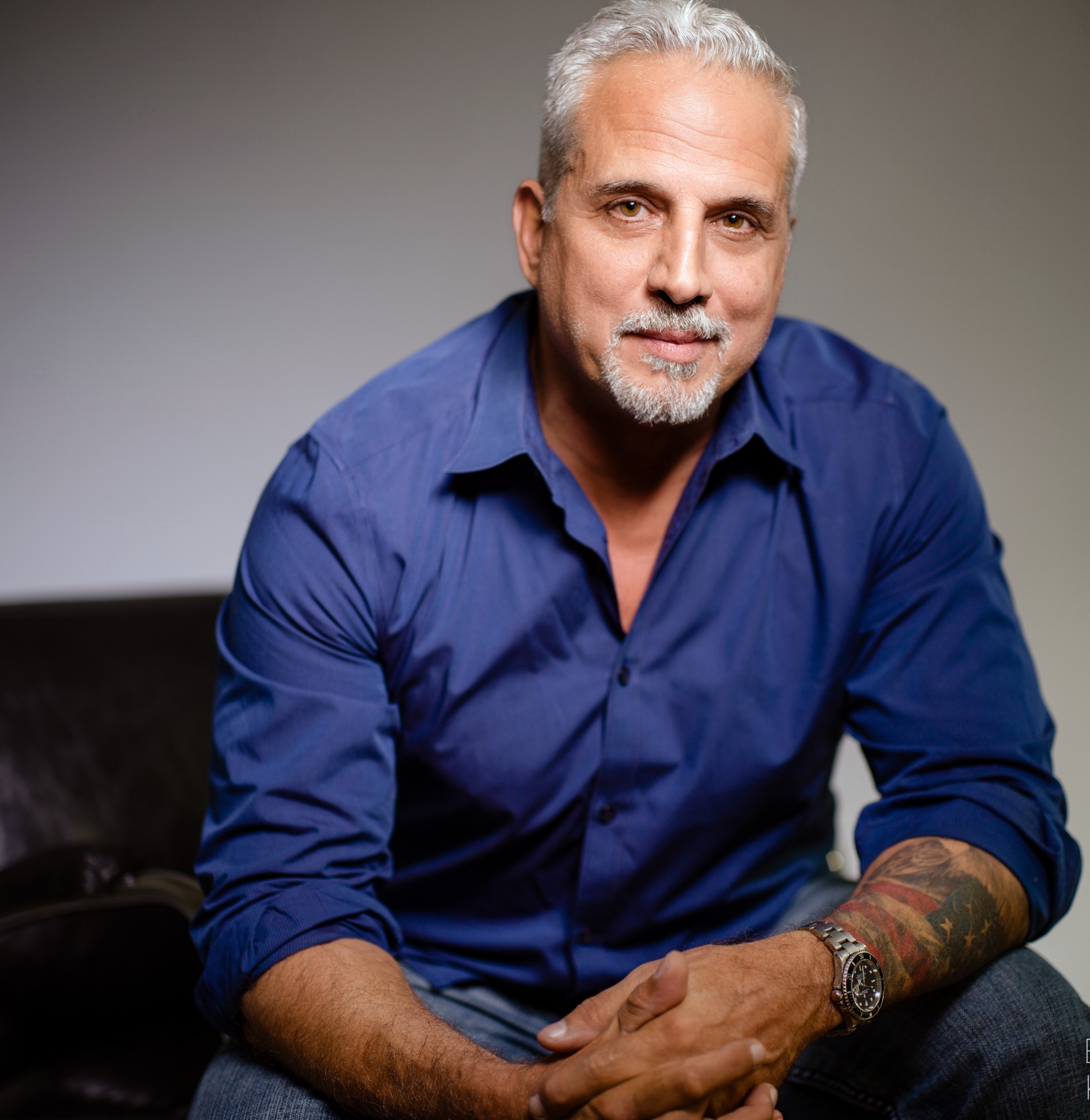
- Di Paolo in 2021
- Born: Nicholas Rocco Di Paolo; January 31, 1962 (age 64); Beverly, Massachusetts, U.S.
- Education: University of Maine
- Occupations: Stand-up comedian; writer; actor; radio personality; podcast host
- Notable work: Comedy Central Roast; The Howard Stern Show; Opie and Anthony; Tough Crowd with Colin Quinn
- Spouse: Andrea Di Paolo (m. 2003)

Comedy career
- Years active: 1987–present
- Medium: Stand-up; television; radio; podcast
- Genres: Observational humor; Black comedy; Insult comedy; News satire; Off-color humor
- Subjects: Current events; American politics; PC Culture; Race relations; Sports; Pop culture

YouTube information
- Channel: Nick Di Paolo
- Years active: 2010–present
- Genres: Comedy; Politics; Talk
- Subscribers: 165 thousand
- Views: 15.3 million
- Last updated: October 31, 2025
- Website: www.nickdip.com

Nicholas Rocco Di Paolo (born January 31, 1962) is an American stand-up comedian, writer, actor, radio personality and podcast host. He is the host of The Nick Di Paolo Show podcast, and is best known for his appearances as a regular on Tough Crowd with Colin Quinn, the Comedy Central Roasts, The Chris Rock Show, Opie and Anthony, and The Howard Stern Show, as well as recurring roles on Louie, Grace Under Fire, World's Dumbest..., and Horace and Pete.

== Early life ==
Di Paolo was born in Beverly, Massachusetts, and grew up in nearby Danvers, the son of Nick and Joan Di Paolo. In 1980, after graduating from high school, he attended the University of Maine where he was a running back on the university's football team and graduated in 1984 with a major in marketing. He joined the fraternity Sigma Nu. His brother also attended the university and did play-by-play commentary for the Maine Black Bears hockey team with Gary Thorne.

After graduating, Di Paolo landed several jobs, including office jobs in marketing and as a door-to-door salesman selling meat and seafood. During this time, the stand-up comedy scene in the Boston area had picked up and a friend encouraged Di Paolo to go on stage. Di Paolo was a fan of stand-up and was influenced by watching comedians appear on The Tonight Show Starring Johnny Carson, David Letterman on The Mike Douglas Show, Jay Leno on The Merv Griffin Show, and Robert Klein. He had wanted to have a go for several years but "didn't have the guts" but his lack of enjoyment as a salesman "led me to the stage". Di Paolo performed his first routine in the summer of 1986 at an open mic night at Stitches club in Boston, traveling from a family barbecue with "about 22 beers in me". He recalled his five-minute set went "pretty well" and wanted to pursue it full time, but his salesman job required a temporary relocation to Rhode Island. In the spring of 1987, he returned to Boston and started to make regular appearances at local open mic nights.

== Career ==
=== 1980s–1990s ===
From 1987 to 1992, he worked clubs in the New England area, including the Comedy Vault, the Comedy Connection, and Stitches. Two years in, he did his first gigs in New York City which included a regular spot at Catch a Rising Star. He described his act during this early period as "a rapid fire approach, four or five punches attached to every joke". Upon moving to New York City, Di Paolo's act became more political from reading local newspapers and comparing views of each publication. In his first year as a stand-up comic, he secured Barry Katz as his manager and performed on over 300 nights. Di Paolo went on to live in New York City with comedian Louis C.K. as his roommate.

In 1992, Di Paolo relocated to Los Angeles. While there he developed his stand-up act in local comedy clubs and took on several television and film roles. He went on to make an early appearance on national television on The Arsenio Hall Show and featured on HBO's Young Comedian's Special, which focused on up and coming comics. While in Los Angeles, Di Paolo befriended comedian and actor Artie Lange during an audition for a pilot that had Lange play the lead.

Di Paolo's first stand-up album, Born This Way, was released in 1999 and was recorded at The Comedy Store in La Jolla, California. Its title was suggested by comedian Colin Quinn.

=== 2000s ===
After five years in Los Angeles, Di Paolo had considered returning to New York City when Chris Rock offered him a writing position on The Chris Rock Show which was based in the city. He accepted, and wrote for two seasons. In 2001, he and the team of writers were nominated for an Emmy Award for Outstanding Writing for a Variety, Music, or Comedy Program. It was Di Paolo's second Emmy Award nomination. By 2001, Di Paolo had settled in Queens.

In June 2001, Di Paolo made his first appearance on Late Show with David Letterman and later, filmed promos for the Comedy Central roast of Hugh Hefner. His appearances on The Howard Stern Show soon after led to comedy gigs nationwide with various staff from the show, including Stuttering John and Artie Lange, which further raised his profile.

From 2002 to 2004, Di Paolo was a regular guest on the Comedy Central show Tough Crowd with Colin Quinn. He has appeared on several roasts for the network, including The Comedy Central Roast of Pamela Anderson, The Comedy Central Roast of Denis Leary, The Comedy Central Roast of Jeff Foxworthy and The Comedy Central Roast of Larry the Cable Guy.

In 2004, Di Paolo released his second comedy album, Road Rage. Like his first, it was titled by Quinn. Also that year, he starred in Shorties Watchin' Shorties, an animated comedy series on Comedy Central, alongside Patrice O'Neal. They voice two unsupervised babies who comment on television clips, including performances by fellow stand-up comics. The idea originated from Di Paolo after the network wanted the pair to work together. He has done several Comics Come Home benefit shows.

He was cast as a police officer in Artie Lange's feature film Artie Lange's Beer League and in The Sopranos. He also wrote for the 77th Academy Awards and the MTV Video Music Awards.

From December 2006 to December 2007, Di Paolo hosted an afternoon radio show on WFNY in New York City. He left the station after management decided to change formats. He then took fill in spots on the air, including Jerry Doyle, Dennis Miller, and Dan Patrick. In January 2008, Di Paolo began an occasional online talk show on BlogTalkRadio.

Other television appearances include The Colin Quinn Show on NBC, NewsRadio, Suddenly Susan and The Smoking Gun Presents.

He has been a guest on radio shows, including The Howard Stern Show, Opie and Anthony, and The Dennis Miller Show.

He was cast as the building superintendent on Louis C.K.'s HBO show Lucky Louie, and appeared with a recurring role in Louis C.K.'s FX series Louie.

Di Paolo has done USO tours in Cuba and Japan. In 2008, he performed stand-up for US soldiers in Afghanistan as a part of Operation Mirth, which Lange named and headlined. He was joined by Gary Dell'Abate and Dave Attell.

=== 2010–2018 ===
In April 2011, Di Paolo's special Raw Nerve was released as part of the Comedy Central Presents... series and on the television network Showtime.

In October 2011, Di Paolo launched a syndicated sports entertainment radio show with Lange named The Nick & Artie Show. Di Paolo left in January 2013. Lange continued to host the show with former professional American football player Jon Ritchie that was renamed The Artie Lange Show. In October 2013, Di Paolo launched his weekly podcast, The Nick Di Paolo Podcast, on the Riotcast network. The weekly episodes were free while additional episodes were exclusive to his ConnectPal donators. The podcast ended in April 2018 following his firing from SiriusXM, after 226 episodes. Di Paolo was fired from SiriusXM after he posted comments on his Twitter account which read “School shooters, please confine yourself to coll. campuses, specifically faculty lounges at Berkeley, Fresno State etc.” Di Paolo was subsequently fired, to which Di Paolo responded that SiriusXM had overreacted and his “poorly worded” tweet was only worth a suspension “at best”. In 2014, Di Paolo released his comedy special, Another Senseless Killing. He wanted to film it in an intimate club setting and chose Acme in Minneapolis.

In late 2016, Di Paolo filmed his comedy special entitled Inflammatory. It was released on DVD and digital download in 2017. From May 15, 2017, to April 2018, Di Paolo hosted an evening radio show on the talk/comedy channel Faction Talk on Sirius XM Radio that aired from Monday through Thursday. Excerpts from the show were released as a weekly installment of his podcast, The Nick Di Paolo Podcast. The show was cancelled after Di Paolo had posted comments on his Twitter account that management deemed offensive, and was subsequently fired. Di Paolo maintained that his "poorly worded tweet" should have resulted in a temporary suspension "at best", and that SiriusXM had overreacted.

In March 2018, Di Paolo kicked off his nationwide Nick is Right Tour.

=== The Nick Di Paolo Show ===
On July 9, 2018, following Di Paolo's exit from Sirius XM Radio, his launched his new audio and video podcast titled The Nick Di Paolo Show. The one-hour show airs live four days a week from his private studio. The free stream is broadcast live on YouTube, with his premium content released via Patreon. The talk radio-styled podcast sees Di Paolo delve into various topics, including the news, American politics, modern society, race relations, and social justice. Di Paolo occasionally has guests on his show, of which include comedian Kurt Metzger, author A.J. Rice, comedian Colin Quinn, and radio personality Anthony Cumia.

=== 2019–present ===
On May 6, 2019, Di Paolo released his one-hour comedy special, A Breath of Fresh Air, for free on YouTube. He wanted to release it "without any media/industry filter" that networks such as Netflix or Comedy Central have in place, and his management aimed to present Di Paolo to a wider audience to increase his profile. It was filmed in February 2019 at the Cohoes Music Hall in Cohoes, New York in front of a sold-out crowd. Di Paolo had performed at the venue two years prior and wanted to return to produce a special there.

Since 2021, Di Paolo has been a contributing writer for the Fox News Channel's late night show Gutfeld!, most often providing additional material for host Greg Gutfeld and helping co-write the nightly opening monologues.

In 2022, Di Paolo co-starred in the Louis C.K. film Fourth of July, playing the obnoxious uncle of Joe List.

In March 2023, Di Paolo joined the Mug Club network founded by Steven Crowder, where he will be joined by Alex Jones and Bryan Callen.

== Personal life ==
Di Paolo married his wife Andrea in March 2003. They have been together since 1994. After returning to New York City in the early 2000s, Di Paolo moved to Tarrytown, New York. This was followed by a move to New Castle in Westchester County, New York in 2004. In April 2019, Di Paolo and his wife Andrea moved to Savannah, Georgia. His father Nicholas G. DiPaolo, a former Marine, died of Alzheimer's disease on June 30, 2020, in Danvers, Massachusetts.

== Politics ==
Di Paolo was mentioned as part of a shock radio "brethren" in a 2007 New York Times article about CBS Radio's decision to fire Don Imus for referring to black college basketball players as "nappy-headed hoes". The article described one of Di Paolo's bits in which he mocked an employee training manual entitled "Words Hurt and Harm", stating, "Right away, we’re starting with a false premise, because words don't hurt".

== Comedy specials ==
- Born This Way (1999; CD, download)
- Road Rage (2004; CD, download)
- Funny, How? (2008 CD, download)
- Raw Nerve (2011; DVD, download)
- Another Senseless Killing (2014; CD, DVD, download)
- Inflammatory (2017; DVD, download)
- A Breath of Fresh Air (2019; YouTube)

== Filmography ==
=== Film ===
Year	Title	Role	Notes
1990	Caesar's Salad	Unknown	Short film
1998	Tomorrow Night	Nick Vagina	
2006	Artie Lange's Beer League	Cousin Mickey	
2017	The Comedian	Himself	
2022	Fourth of July	Uncle Kevin	

=== Television ===
Year	Title	Role	Notes
1994–1997	Grace Under Fire	Stevie Ray / Tony	8 episodes
1998	NewsRadio	Jack	Episode: "Who's the Boss: Part 2"
1998	Fame L.A.	Joey	Episode: "The Key to Success"
1998–1999	The Chris Rock Show	Officer Nardizi / Officer Bertini / Officer Reno	13 episodes; also writer
2002–2004	Tough Crowd with Colin Quinn	Various	on the panel for multiple episodes; also writer
2002	The Sopranos	Joey the Cop	Episode: "Christopher"
2004	Rescue Me	Boston Fireman #2	Episode: "Orphans"
2004	Shorties Watchin' Shorties	Baby Nick	9 episodes
2005	77th Academy Awards	—N/a	Special material writer
2005	I Love the '80s 3-D	Himself	Episode: "1989"
2006	Lucky Louie	Nick	2 episodes
2010–2015	Louie	Nick	12 episodes
2015	Inside Amy Schumer	Juror #3	Episode: "12 Angry Men Inside Amy Schumer"
2016	Horace and Pete	Nick	Web series; 3 episodes
