= The Soundtrack from Dane Cook's Tourgasm =

Soundtrack album by Various Artists
- Released: January 9, 2007
- Genre: Rock, Comedy
- Length: 45:49
- Label: Rhino Records

Professional ratings
Review scores
Source	Rating
Allmusic	link

The Soundtrack from Dane Cook's Tourgasm was released in 2007 on Rhino Records. The album features rock tracks from mostly unsigned and/or indie talent. Every other track however are comedy tracks by the Tourgasm cast (Dane Cook, Jay Davis, Gary Gulman, Robert Kelly) pulled directly from the show.

== Track listing ==
Track #	Song	Artist	Length
1	Tourgasm Time		0:04
2	Dimension	Wolfmother	4:21
3	What's Up, Pop?		0:40
4	Straight to Video	Truepenny	3:27
5	No. Not a Good Morning		0:17
6	Everything You Wanted	My Rich Friends	3:46
7	Ball Sack		0:12
8	The Movers & Shakers	Tandemoro	2:48
9	Taxgasm?		0:19
10	Don't Lie Down	Jealousy Curve	3:05
11	Itchy Fans		0:13
12	Alternate Lifestyle	Cruelty Free	3:18
13	Brokebutt Mountain		0:21
14	Got to Get It	Ride the Blinds	3:12
15	Fart King		0:28
16	What I Give	Mateo Denali	4:03
17	F**king Turtle		0:20
18	Bloodhounds on My Trail	The Black Angels	3:51
19	Splays Potato Chips		0:09
20	On My Own	ColdFusion	3:17
21	Ball Busting		0:56
22	Rabbit in the Bag	Nico Vega	3:57
23	Good Stuff		0:23
24	First Lullaby	Angel	2:22
