= Broken leg (disambiguation) =

A broken leg is a fracture of the leg bone.

Broken leg may also refer to:

- "Broken Leg", a song by Bluejuice
- Broke Leg Creek, a stream in Kentucky

== See also ==
- Break a leg (disambiguation)
