= Patrice O'Neal =

American comedian and actor (1969–2011)

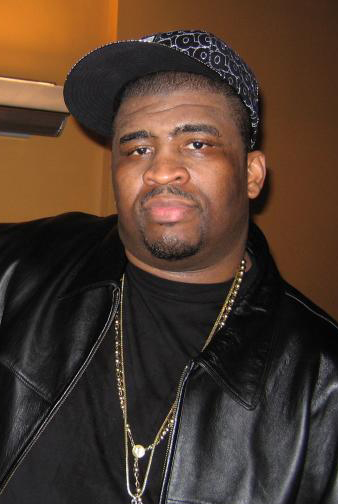
- O'Neal in January 2006
- Born: December 7, 1969; New York City, U.S.
- Died: November 29, 2011 (aged 41); Englewood, New Jersey, U.S.
- Occupations: Comedian; actor
- Years active: 1990–2011
- Website: patriceoneal.com

Patrice Lumumba Malcolm O'Neal (December 7, 1969 – November 29, 2011) was an American comedian and actor. He was known for his stand-up comedy career and his regular guest appearances on the talk show Tough Crowd with Colin Quinn and the radio show Opie and Anthony.

O'Neal began performing stand-up in 1992 and developed an act based on conversations with the audience, deconstructive analysis, and occasionally confrontational points of view. From 2006 to 2008, he presented The Black Phillip Show on XM Satellite Radio. His only one-hour stand-up comedy special, Elephant in the Room (2011), was released nine months before his death at the age of 41 from a stroke caused by type 2 diabetes. A posthumous follow-up, Mr. P (2012), was released as audio only.

== Early life ==
Patrice Lumumba Malcolm O'Neal was born in New York City on December 7, 1969. He was named by his mother after Patrice Lumumba, leader of the Congolese independence movement and the Republic of the Congo's first prime minister, and the African-American human rights activist Malcolm X. He was bullied at school over his name, but later said that it taught him "how to be a man". He and his sister, Zinder, were raised by their mother in Boston's largely black working class Roxbury neighborhood. O'Neal never had a relationship with his father, although he was aware of his identity. In his adolescence, O'Neal has said that he was convicted of statutory rape of a girl who was one year younger than him, and he spent a summer in prison.

O'Neal attended West Roxbury High School, during which he took up football and ended his playing career with three varsity letter awards and winning a state championship in his senior year. He turned down a sports scholarship at Northeastern University in Boston, which included a housing grant, in favor of studying performing arts at the university with a major in theater studies. His interest in comedy had grown by this time, and he took up work as a bouncer at the Comedy Connection in Boston. He also sold food to guests at the Boston Garden arena.

== Career ==
=== Stand-up comedy ===
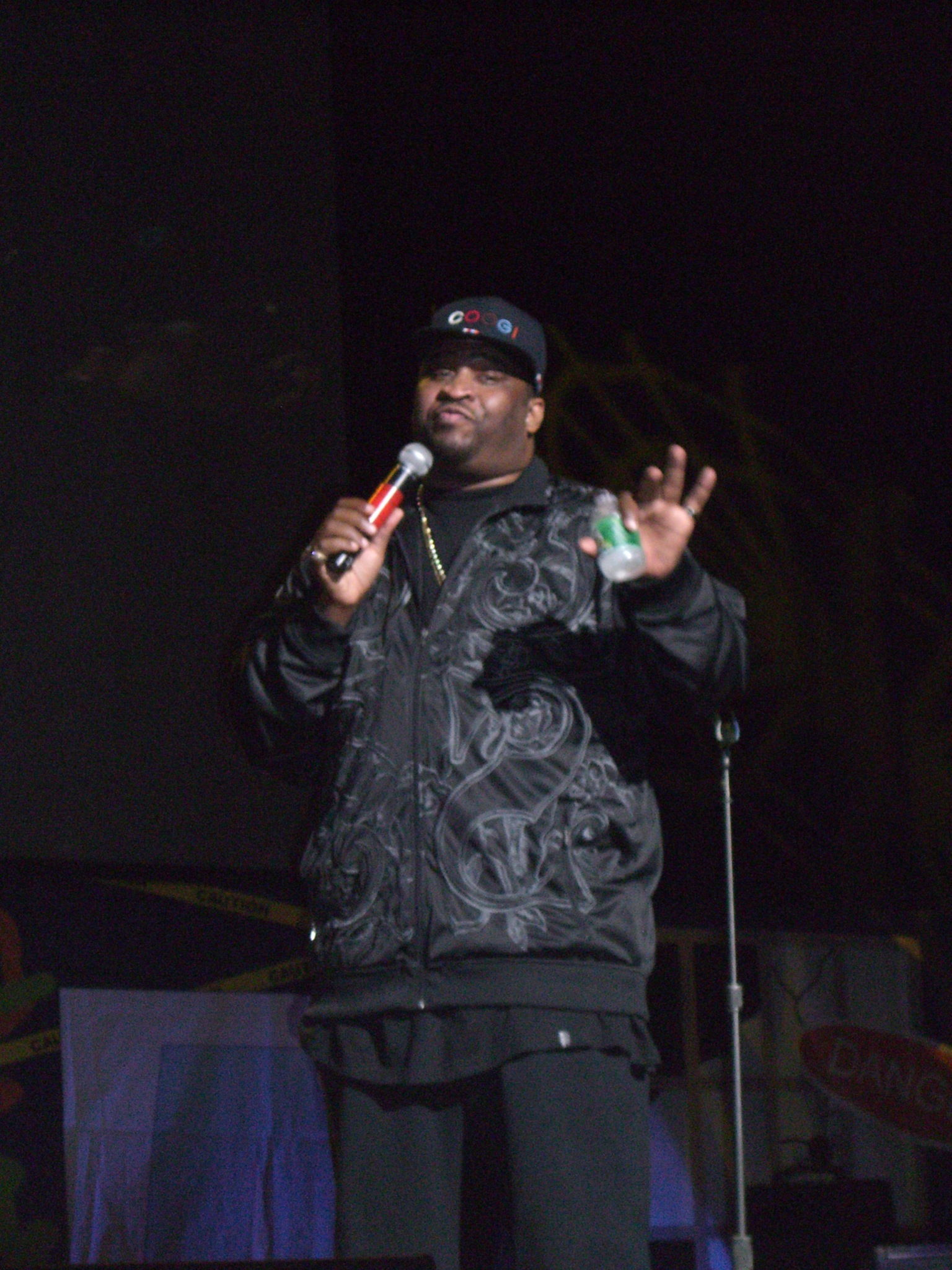
O'Neal on stage in 2007

O'Neal performed his first stand-up in October 1992 at Estelle's in Boston. He had attended an open-mic night at the venue the week prior to his debut where he heckled a performer, who in turn challenged him to try stand-up himself. Comedian Dane Cook witnessed one of O'Neal's earliest sets and noted his "gentle-giant appeal ... he already had an edge, but he was a little more vulnerable". O'Neal developed his act in the Boston area for the next six years, where his earlier performances were done under the name Bruiser O'Neal. In the mid-1990s, he met comedian and later close friend Jim Norton.

In 1998, O'Neal relocated to New York City, working regular spots at the Comedy Cellar. In early 1998, he took part in the fourth annual US Comedy Arts Festival in Aspen, Colorado. He then moved to Los Angeles in the hopes of finding greater fame: "I tap danced like you wouldn't believe ... trying to get something." O'Neal ignored demands from club owners to change his confrontational act and struggled to earn enough money. He was "essentially thrown out of America" and accepted offers to perform in the UK, first by English stand-up John Simmit for a part on his Upfront Comedy circuit. O'Neal worked hard to gain the respect of his peers, recalling that it took several months "for them to go 'okay, this guy's not playing around'". By mid-1999, he had headlined a comedy tour of Australia. Between 2000 and 2002, he performed stand-up across Europe, including spots at the Black International Comedy Awards in London and in Edinburgh with comedians Lewis Schaffer and Rich Vos.

In 2006 and 2007, O'Neal joined Opie and Anthony's Traveling Virus Comedy Tour, playing large arenas across the US.

In 2010, O'Neal recorded his first and only hour special for Comedy Central, Elephant in the Room. It originated after comedian Dave Attell had praised O'Neal's material to his manager, who entered discussions with the network about producing one. Despite O'Neal being adamant on filming in Washington, D.C., the network wanted it recorded in New York City and O'Neal eventually agreed. The special premiered on February 19, 2011, with an uncut version released on CD and DVD three days later. O'Neal promoted the special with an interview on Late Night with Jimmy Fallon, his first network television appearance in four years.

=== Television ===
In late 2000, O'Neal took a position as a writer for WWE after an associate of the company saw him perform. A big fan of professional wrestling, he pitched his idea for building a feud over three weeks that culminated in a pay-per-view event, which won him the job. He visited Vince McMahon's house, traveled with the organization for one week of live shows on their private jet, and directed some vignettes. He was then offered a 13-week contract but turned it down as he already had plans. He later said that "it wouldn't have been a dream" if he had kept doing it and that it was enjoyable because "it was short and sweet". Later in his career, he also walked away from potential opportunities such as acting roles on Web Junk 20, The Office, and Arrested Development, though he would eventually guest star on the latter two. He jokingly described himself as a "professional bridge-burner".

By 2002, O'Neal had returned to the U.S. after he received an offer to record a half-hour comedy special on Showtime. He landed his first of a series of television appearances, beginning with the sketch program The Colin Quinn Show, followed by Tough Crowd with Colin Quinn which he appeared from 2002 until its cancellation in 2004. In 2003, he recorded a special for Comedy Central Presents. His first television appearance was on The Apollo Comedy Hour. From there, he moved on to appearances on Showtime at the Apollo and FNight Videos. He appeared in guest-starring roles on MTV's Apartment 2F, Assy McGee, Yes Dear, Arrested Development, Chappelle's Show, and The Office.

O'Neal was a regular on the Fox series The Jury and starred in the Comedy Central animated program Shorties Watchin' Shorties with Nick Di Paolo. He supplied the voice of Harold Jenkins on Noggin's animated program O'Grady and was featured as Jesus in Denis Leary's Searchlight. In 2005, he filmed a half-hour One Night Stand special for HBO. He then became the host of the seasons one and two of Web Junk 20 on VH1, in 2006. After two seasons, O'Neal declined to host the third despite an offer that quadrupled his salary. He was replaced by Jim Breuer.

In 2007, O'Neal revealed he turned down an opportunity to appear on Celebrity Fit Club and said that his "career is more important than [his] health". O'Neal made five appearances at the annual Just for Laughs festival in Montreal, including a one-man, one-week show at Théâtre Sainte-Catherine in 2008.

In 2007, O'Neal wrote and starred in a web series called The Patrice O'Neal Show – Coming Soon! It featured his girlfriend Von Decarlo Brown, Dante Nero, Bryan Kennedy, Harris Stanton, and Wil Sylvince. The series did not last long as it was unable to attain a sponsor due to its offensive content. He guest starred in another For Your Imagination-produced show, called Break a Leg, playing "Adult-Sized Gary Coleman".

He played the role of a warehouse worker named Lonny Collins on the American TV series, The Office from 2005-2007.

In 2011, O'Neal performed as one of the comedians for The Comedy Central Roast of Charlie Sheen as he expressed his respect for the actor and wished to tell him in person. The show aired on September 19, 2011, with O'Neal the last comic to perform. It acquired 6.4 million viewers, still the highest-rated edition of the Comedy Central roasts. O'Neal's appearance on the roast was to be his final television appearance prior to his untimely death two months later. After the taping, O'Neal met William Shatner and his wife, who were also in attendance, in the garage and the couple offered their support to O'Neal regarding his diabetes, after which the three cried. Shatner recalled, "He knew that he was dying, that he was a dying man, and in a way, he wanted to die ... That's what I saw. That's why we cried."

=== Radio ===
In 2002, O'Neal had returned to the New York City area. He made his debut appearance on the Opie and Anthony radio show on January 17, 2002, when friend and comedian Rich Vos brought him onto the show, which at the time aired from WNEW. After the show was cancelled in 2002 and relaunched on XM Satellite Radio in 2004, O'Neal returned as a guest, or sometimes sitting in for an absent Norton and became one of the show's most popular guests.

In 2006, O'Neal settled in Jersey City. From 2006 to 2008, O'Neal hosted a relationship advice show on XM initially titled Bitch Management before it was renamed to The Black Philip Show, a reference to television personality "Dr. Phil" McGraw. The show aired on Saturday evenings with Dante Nero as co-host, and a rotating cast of female comedians on third mic. The show ended following the XM and Sirius merger, when the new management was unable to reconcile budgets for Saturday night programming.

In March 2010, O'Neal secured a deal with Comedy Central for a stand-up special and a script for a proposed reality television show, Patrice O'Neal's Guide to White People. He got the idea for the latter after he interjected into a conversation with two white males over guitar riffs, and thought of the idea of him "trying to learn about white folks". The show was cancelled before filming could begin.

O'Neal's views on women have been the subject of discussion and sometimes described as misogynistic. In an August 2010 appearance on the podcast WTF with Marc Maron, he stated that he was a "terrible misogynist" when he met his then-girlfriend.

=== Other projects ===
O'Neal also appeared as a guest on other shows such as The Alex Jones Show and segments on Fox News. He voiced Jeffron James in the 2008 video game Grand Theft Auto IV on its in-game radio station Fizz!

On October 27, 2011, O'Neal's final interview was released with Jay Mohr for his podcast, Mohr Stories. He stated that his appearance at Sheen's roast did little to transform his career apart from helping sell out a weekend of stand-up shows at Caroline's. He revealed a further meeting with FX regarding a possible animated series and a project that involved his friends coming to his home to record interviews.

After O'Neal's death, BSeen Media announced the release of his first comedy album Mr. P, on which he had been working. The set, recorded in April 2011 at D.C. Improv in Washington, D.C., was released on February 7, 2012, with his involvement prior to his passing. Sales of the release were donated to his mother, girlfriend, and stepdaughter. The album reached number one on the Billboard Comedy Albums chart and number 35 on the Billboard 200. On November 6, 2012, a 20-minute selection of previously unreleased material was released on O'Neal's website and through iTunes titled Better Than You.

On February 19, 2021, Comedy Central released Patrice O'Neal: Killing is Easy, a documentary on O'Neal's life and career. It was directed by Michael Bonfiglio who also served as executive producer along with Bill Burr, Al Madrigal, Michael Bertolina, and Vondecarlo Brown.

== Comic style ==
O'Neal cited George Carlin and Richard Pryor as his favorite comedians. His comedy has been described as conversational. His routines were characterized by an off-the-cuff approach and frequently adult themes. He was direct when presenting his views, particularly on race and gender roles. He was also a provocateur who often incited audience members to heckle or even leave the club.

== Personal life ==
O'Neal was engaged to actress Von Decarlo Brown at the time of his death.

=== Death ===
On the morning of October 19, 2011, O'Neal phoned his fiancée Von Decarlo Brown to tell her he could not move his legs. He was rushed to Jersey City Medical Center and later Englewood Hospital in Englewood, New Jersey, where doctors performed surgery to remove a blood clot in his head. He lost his ability to speak, and later his ability to move, communicating for a time by eye movements before also losing this ability. Doctors stated that he would likely remain permanently paralyzed and unable to speak if he survived. News of the stroke he had suffered was made public on Opie and Anthony a week later.

O'Neal died at 7:00 am on November 29, 2011, of complications from his stroke, which was caused by the type 2 diabetes he had since his early 20s. He was 41 years old. At the time, he had been trying to address his health issues by experimenting with veganism, replacing sugary food with sugar-free substitutes, and abandoning other sweets and soda. His funeral was held on December 5 at New York's Park Avenue Christian Church and was attended by, among others, Chris Rock, Colin Quinn, Nick DiPaolo, Artie Lange, Louis C.K., Jim Norton, Dave Attell, Dane Cook, Bill Burr, Wanda Sykes, Gregg Hughes, Anthony Cumia, Rich Vos, Jay Oakerson and Kevin Hart.

The day after O'Neal's death, comedians gathered to eulogize him on Opie and Anthony, including Bill Burr, Robert Kelly, Colin Quinn, Joe Rogan, Dave Attell, Rich Vos, Jim Florentine, Russ Meneve, Joe DeRosa, Amy Schumer, Kurt Metzger, and Louis C.K. The channel dedicated its programming that weekend to O'Neal, airing a 16-hour special, A Tribute to Patrice O'Neal, featuring some of his best appearances, along with memories from fellow comedians. That evening, Comedy Central broadcast his special Elephant in the Room. Rolling Stone ran a four-page article about O'Neal's career and death in its February 2012 issue. In June 2012, Norton dedicated his one-hour EPIX comedy special Please Be Offended to O'Neal. On September 23, 2012, during the 64th Primetime Emmy Awards, O'Neal was remembered during the "In Memoriam" tribute.

== Discography ==
- Elephant in the Room (2011)
- Mr. P (2012)
- Better Than You (2012)
- Patrice O'Neal: Unreleased (2013)

== Filmography ==
=== Television ===
| Year(s) | Title | Role | Notes |
|---|---|---|---|
| 1997 | Apartment 2F | Comic | |
| 2002 | The Colin Quinn Show | Various | |
| 2002 | Contest Searchlight | Himself | |
| 2002 | Chappelle's Show | Pit Bull | 2 episodes |
| 2002–2004 | Tough Crowd with Colin Quinn | Himself/Various | |
| 2003 | Yes, Dear | Tow Truck Driver | 1 episode |
| 2003 | Ed | Andre Stangel | Uncredited |
| 2003 | Arrested Development | T-Bone | 1 episode |
| 2004 | The Jury | Adam Walker | Recurring |
| 2004 | Shorties Watchin' Shorties | Baby Patrice | Voice |
| 2005 | One Night Stand | Himself | |
| 2004–2006 | O'Grady | Harold | Voice |
| 2005–2007 | The Office | Lonny | 3 episodes |
| 2006 | The Best Man | Himself | unaired Comedy Central pilot |
| 2006 | Web Junk 20 | Host | 2 seasons |
| 2008 | Assy McGee | Blind Anthony | Voice |
| 2008 | Z Rock | Stage Manager | Guest star |
| 2010 | The Green Room with Paul Provenza | Himself | |
| 2011 | The Roast of Charlie Sheen | Himself | Final television appearance |

=== Film ===
| Year(s) | Title | Role | Notes |
|---|---|---|---|
| 2002 | Paper Soldiers | Big T | |
| 2002 | 25th Hour | Khari | |
| 2003 | Head of State | Warren | |
| 2003 | In the Cut | Hector | |
| 2006 | Scary Movie 4 | Rasheed | Uncredited |
| 2010 | Furry Vengeance | Gus | |
| 2011 | Elephant in the Room | Himself | |
| 2012 | Nature Calls | Mr. Caldwell | Posthumous release |

=== Video games ===
| Year(s) | Title | Role | Notes |
|---|---|---|---|
| 2008 | Grand Theft Auto IV | Jeffron James | Fizz! from the radio station WKTT |
