= Mr. P (album) =

Live album by Patrice O'Neal
- Released: February 7, 2012
- Recorded: April 15, 2011, D.C. Improv, Washington, D.C.
- Genre: Stand-up comedy
- Label: BSeen Media

Mr. P is the first and only live album by stand-up comedian Patrice O'Neal. It was released posthumously on February 7, 2012, following the comic's death in November of the previous year. He had planned the release as the follow-up to his Elephant in the Room special, and had completed work on the album before his death, except for the cover art, which is a composite created after O'Neal's illness, based on his description. The album debuted at #35 on the Billboard 200 and #1 on the Billboard Comedy Albums chart. The album also peaked at #76 on the Canadian Albums Chart.

== Track listing ==
1. "Intro" – 6:35
2. "Can't Care" – 5:02
3. "Making Lots of Money" – 6:34
4. "T.S.A." – 3:38
5. "Hate People Touching Me" – 4:27
6. "Obama" – 2:09
7. "Reparations" – 3:51
8. "Race War" – 6:41
9. "Tolu" – 4:51
10. "White Women Are Pleasant" – 5:05
11. "Black Women Get You Refunds" – 1:50
12. "White Women Get Cold" – 4:10
13. "Side Pussy" – 4:17
14. "The Corporation" – 3:56
15. "My Dogs" – 3:52
16. "Start a Hoe, Stay a Hoe" – 2:01
17. "I Like Hoes" – 5:19
