= Pablo Francisco =

American comedian, actor and writer

- Born: Pablo Ridson Francisco; January 4, 1974 (age 52); Tucson, Arizona, U.S.
- Notable work: MADtv and Comedy Central Presents

Comedy career
- Years active: 1994–present
- Medium: Stand-up, television
- Genres: Impressions, surreal humor
- Subjects: Latin American culture, everyday life, movies
- Website: pablofrancisco.com

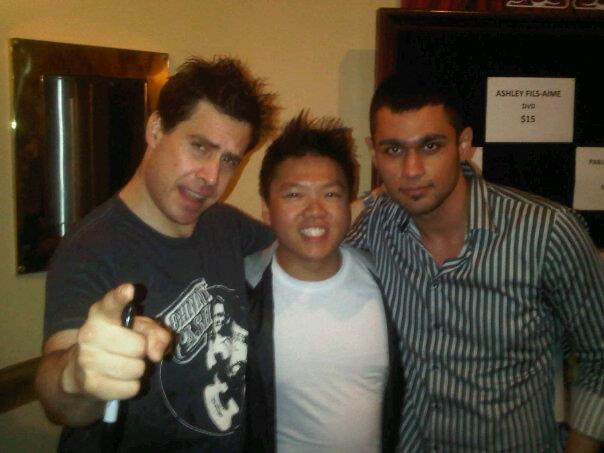
Pablo Francisco (left) with fans after event at the Royal Perth Theatre in Perth, Western Australia 2011

Pablo Ridson Francisco (born January 4, 1974) is an American comedian, actor and writer. He started his career doing improv in Tempe, Arizona.

== Career ==
In the 1990s, he appeared on MADtv as a featured player. His stand-up act was introduced to America at large when he landed his own half-hour comedy special on Comedy Central Presents in 2000. In 2001 and 2002, Francisco toured as part of "The Three Amigos" with Carlos Mencia and Freddy Soto. Since then, he has performed on The Tonight Show with Jay Leno, VH1's ILL-ustrated, Mind of Mencia as "The Voiceover Dude" (same as "Movie Voiceover Guy"), and Frank TV.

Francisco is recognized for vocal impressions of famous people including Jackie Chan, Aaron Neville, Arnold Schwarzenegger, Howard Stern, Casey Kasem, Keanu Reeves, Michael J. Fox, Jerry Springer, Don Lapre, Celine Dion, William Hung, Danny Glover, Gary Busey, and most notably Don LaFontaine (the Movie Voiceover King). He also does sound effects and character voices like Count Dracula (as a Spanish Radio DeeJay), Droopy Dog, Chris Rock, R2-D2, Kermit the Frog, Stone Cold Steve Austin, Ozzy Osbourne, Ricky Martin, George Clooney, Dennis Haysbert, Anthony Sullivan, Christopher Walken, and Mr. Magoo. He also has a talent for beatboxing.

In 2004, he performed a set at the Irvine Spectrum Center Improv club, which was filmed and released as the DVD Bits and Pieces. His stand-up material was also used in Comedy Central's animated series Shorties Watchin' Shorties.

== Television appearances ==
- MADtv
- Make Me Laugh
- The Tonight Show with Jay Leno
- VH1's ILL-ustrated
- Mind of Mencia (as The Voiceover Dude)
- Frank TV
- Vakna Med the Voice (Swedish TV)
- Just for Laughs Festival in Montreal
- Last Comic Standing
- Tonight with Trevor Noah
- Late Night with Jimmy Fallon
- Gabriel Iglesias Presents Stand-Up Revolution
- Comics Unleashed with Byron Allen
- Shorties Watchin' Shorties

== Specials ==
- Comedy Central Presents (2000)
- The Three Amigos (with Carlos Mencia and Freddy Soto) (2002)
- Bits and Pieces (2004, DVD/CD)
- Ouch!! (2006, DVD)
- They Put It Out There (2011, DVD)

== Discography ==
- Knee to the Groin (1997)
- Sausage (2000)
- 3 (2003)
