= Break a leg (disambiguation) =

Break a leg is a well-known idiom in theatre which means "good luck". It may also refer to:

- Break a Leg (web series), an American comedy web series
- "Break a Leg" (song)
- Ira Levin stage comedy Break A Leg
