= Bonnie McFarlane =

Canadian-American comedian and writer

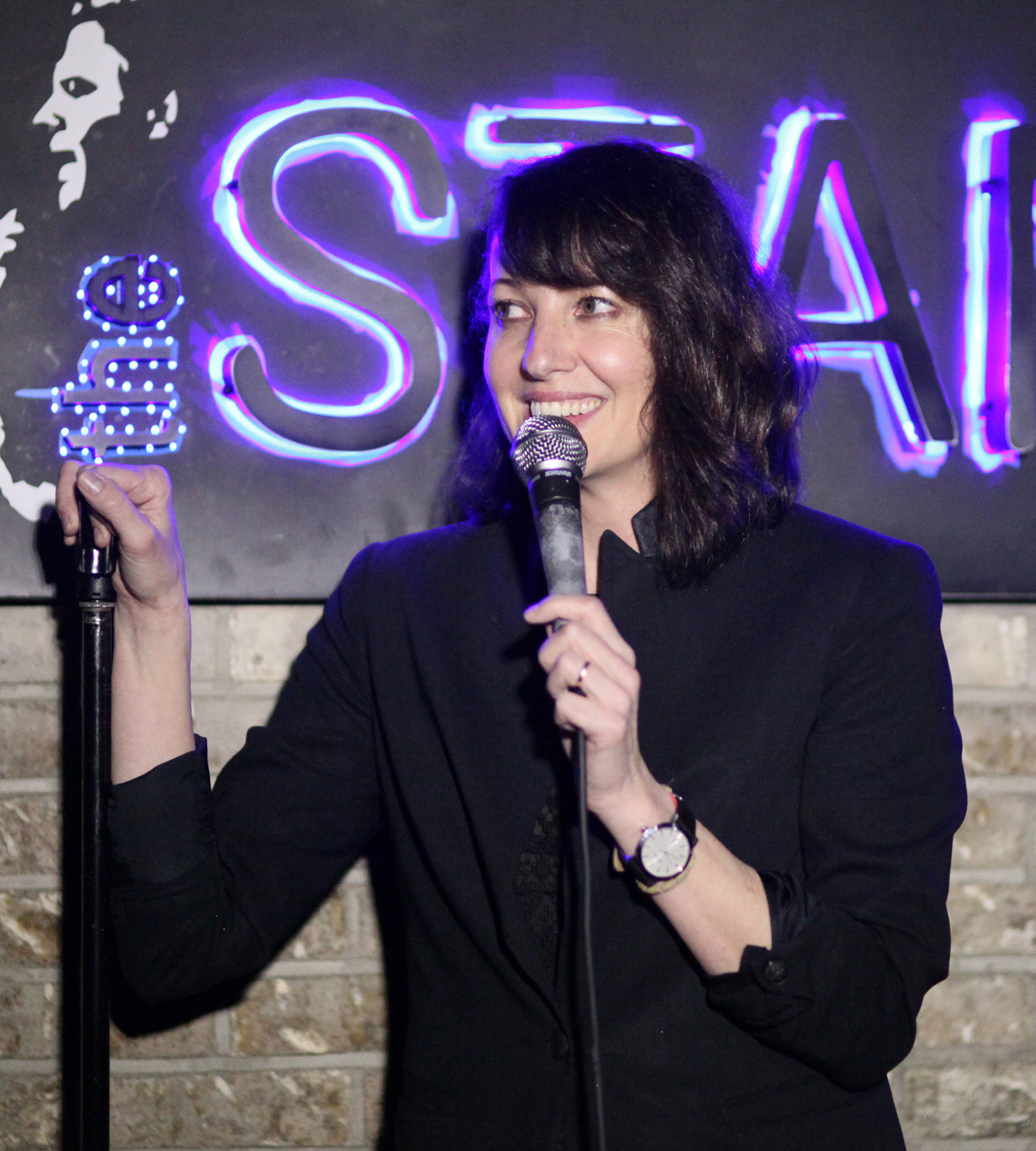
- McFarlane in June 2017
- Born: March 28, 1969 (age 57); Cold Lake, Alberta, Canada
- Spouse: Rich Vos (m. 2005)
- Children: 1

Comedy career
- Medium: Comedy, television, writing

Bonnie McFarlane (born March 28, 1969) is a Canadian comedian and writer. She is best known for appearing on the second season of the TV reality show Last Comic Standing and for co-hosting the podcast My Wife Hates Me with her husband Rich Vos.

== Early life ==
McFarlane was born March 28, 1969, in Cold Lake, Alberta, Canada, the youngest of four daughters. She was raised on her parents' rural farm outside Cold Lake.

== Career ==
McFarlane did her first open mic in Vancouver, British Columbia, Canada. The manager of the club told her that she should enter a contest, "The Search for Canada's Funniest New Comic". McFarlane entered the contest and won. She then moved to New York where she landed a manager and an agent. She also spent time in Los Angeles doing stand-up and writing. McFarlane has appeared on The Tonight Show with Jay Leno, Late Show with David Letterman, and The Late Late Show with Craig Kilborn. She appeared as a panelist on Tough Crowd with Colin Quinn and Red Eye w/Greg Gutfeld and as one of Dr. Katz's patients on Dr. Katz, Professional Therapist. In 2004, she appeared on season two of the NBC reality show Last Comic Standing. She was the first comedian eliminated. In 2005, she had her own HBO One Night Stand special. In 2008, she had her own Comedy Central Presents half-hour special. She is also one of the hosts of the Nickelodeon show NickMom Night Out. McFarlane made occasional appearances on the Opie and Anthony radio program and on the Opie and Jim Norton show. She has also hosted Comedy.tv.

McFarlane wrote and directed the film Women Aren't Funny, which was previewed at Caroline's on Broadway in November 2012. The film was released in August 2014.

In 2016, McFarlane released You're Better Than Me, a memoir published by Anthony Bourdain which recounts McFarlane's upbringing and comedic career.
