= Fourth of July (film) =

2022 film directed by Louis C.K.

- Poster
- Directed by: Louis C.K.
- Written by: Louis C.K.; Joe List
- Produced by: Louis C.K.
- Starring: Joe List; Sarah Tollemache; Nick Di Paolo; Louis C.K.; Paula Plum
- Cinematography: Christopher Raymond
- Edited by: Louis C.K.
- Music by: Matt Kilmer
- Production company: Circus King Productions
- Distributed by: Abramorama
- Release date: June 30, 2022
- Running time: 90 minutes
- Country: United States
- Language: English
- Budget: $2 million
- Box office: $325,070

Fourth of July is a 2022 American comedy drama film directed and produced by Louis C.K., who co-wrote the screenplay with Joe List. The film stars List as Jeff, a New York City-based jazz pianist and recovering alcoholic who visits his family in rural Maine for Independence Day, and confronts them about the emotional traumas he experienced with them starting when he was a child. The film's $2 million budget was self-financed by C.K.

Fourth of July premiered at New York City's Beacon Theatre on June 30, 2022.

== Cast ==
- Joe List as Jeff
- Sarah Tollemache as Beth, Jeff's wife
- Paula Plum as Mom
- Robert Walsh as Dad
- Tara Pacheco as Naomi, a friend of Brenda's
- Robert Kelly as Bobby, a new Alcoholics Anonymous sponsee of Jeff's
- Richard O'Rourke as Grandpa
- Dorothy Dwyer as Darlene
- Nick Di Paolo as Uncle Kevin
- Chris Walsh as Uncle Mark
- Tony Viveiros as Tony
- Lynne Koplitz as Tricia
- Courtland Jones as Brenda, Jeff's cousin
- Bill Scheft as Bill, a long-time sponsor of Jeff and drummer in his band
- Louis C.K. as Therapist
- Allan Havey as Dentist

== Reception ==
=== Box office ===
The film earned $218,722 from two theaters in its opening weekend and $16,014 in its second.

The film was released in theaters on several cities across the country for one night only. Though some cities continued to show the film due to positive audience response, Fourth of July never saw a wide release in theaters. On the Joe Rogan Experience, Louis CK explained that most of the revenue was generated by streaming the film on CK's website.

=== Critical response ===
On the review aggregator website Rotten Tomatoes, 36% of 22 critics' reviews are positive, with an average rating of 5.10/10. On Metacritic, the film has a score of 40 out of 100, based on reviews from eleven critics, indicating "mixed or average" reviews.

Kyle Smith of The Wall Street Journal lauded the film as "one of the best films of the year", calling it "acutely observed".

Several reviewers unfavorably compared the film to Tracy Letts's 2007 play August: Osage County, which is similarly about an extended rural family forced to confront its dysfunctions.
