= Conversations with Inanimate Objects =

Studio album by Gary Gulman
- Released: March 11, 2005
- Genre: Stand-up comedy
- Length: 52:03
- Labels: New Wave Entertainment; New Wave Dynamics (reissue)

Gary Gulman chronology
Conversations with Inanimate Objects (2005)	No Can Defend (2012)

Conversations with Inanimate Objects is the debut album by American comedian Gary Gulman, released on New Wave Entertainment in 2005. The album contains twelve tracks. It was reissued on New Wave Dynamics in 2013.

== Track listing ==
No.	Title	Length
1.	"I Feel Terrific!"	2:00
2.	"The Milkman"	2:27
3.	"My Old Old Man"	2:29
4.	"Elementary School"	3:19
5.	"Waking Up For Work"	5:59
6.	"Driving With Mom"	1:48
7.	"Inventions (The Pill)"	7:53
8.	"Be Aggressive!"	2:00
9.	"Prison Joke"	3:07
10.	"The Walrus"	2:15
11.	"Grapefruits of Wrath"	5:24
12.	"The Hierarchy of Cookies"	13:22
Total length:		52:03

2013 reissue track listing
No.	Title	Length
1.	"I Feel Terrific"	2:00
2.	"Milkman"	2:26
3.	"Old Dad"	2:29
4.	"Elementary School"	3:18
5.	"Alarm Clock"	5:59
6.	"Mom Speedometer"	1:48
7.	"Candle Snuffer, the Pill"	7:52
8.	"Sports"	2:00
9.	"Prison"	3:07
10.	"Walrus"	2:14
11.	"Grape vs. Grapefruit (2004)"	5:23
12.	"The Hierarchy of Cookies"	13:22
Total length:		51:58
