= Tourgasm =

2006 American television series

- Genre: Documentary
- Starring: Dane Cook; Jay Davis; Gary Gulman; Robert Kelly
- Country of origin: United States
- Original language: English
- No. of seasons: 1
- No. of episodes: 9

Production
- Producer: Barbara Carratala Bonds
- Camera setup: Multi-camera
- Running time: 28-30 minutes

Original release
- Network: HBO
- Release: June 11 – September 4, 2006

Tourgasm is an American documentary television series that aired on HBO in 2006. The series follows the 2005 30-day 20-show stand-up comedy tour featuring Dane Cook and three of his best friends in the industry: Robert Kelly, Gary Gulman, and Jay Davis.

The documentary was created and directed by Dane Cook. Gary Gulman left the tour because of unknown reasons, but returned after a few dates. At each destination Dane Cook and fellow comedians play a game or do an activity before performing. Some of the events include horseback riding, riding Segway scooters, and visiting Niagara Falls.

== Overview ==
Tourgasm is very similar in format to the Showtime/Comedy Central film and short series The Comedians of Comedy. The Comedians of Comedy consisted of comedians Patton Oswalt, Maria Bamford, Zach Galifianakis, and Brian Posehn. Although similar in format both shows differ in audience numbers. The Comedians Of Comedy mostly play to small rock club audiences whereas Tourgasm plays to mostly college arena audiences. Tourgasm also appeared in select theatres in Canada during the month of September.

The song heard in the beginning and end credits is "Dimension" by Australian rock-band Wolfmother.

== Episodes ==
1. "The First Laugh"
2. "Working It Out"
3. "The United States of Insanity"
4. "The Best of Times..."
5. "Determined and Injured"
6. "Competitively Speaking"
7. "Beginning of the End"
8. "Back in the Day"
9. "Curtain Call"

== Reception ==
Salon.com writer Heather Havrilesky described the series as "the least worthwhile series ever to air on HBO". Common Sense Media rated it 3 out of 5 stars.

== See also ==
- The Soundtrack from Dane Cook's Tourgasm
