= Robert Kelly (comedian) =

American comedian and actor

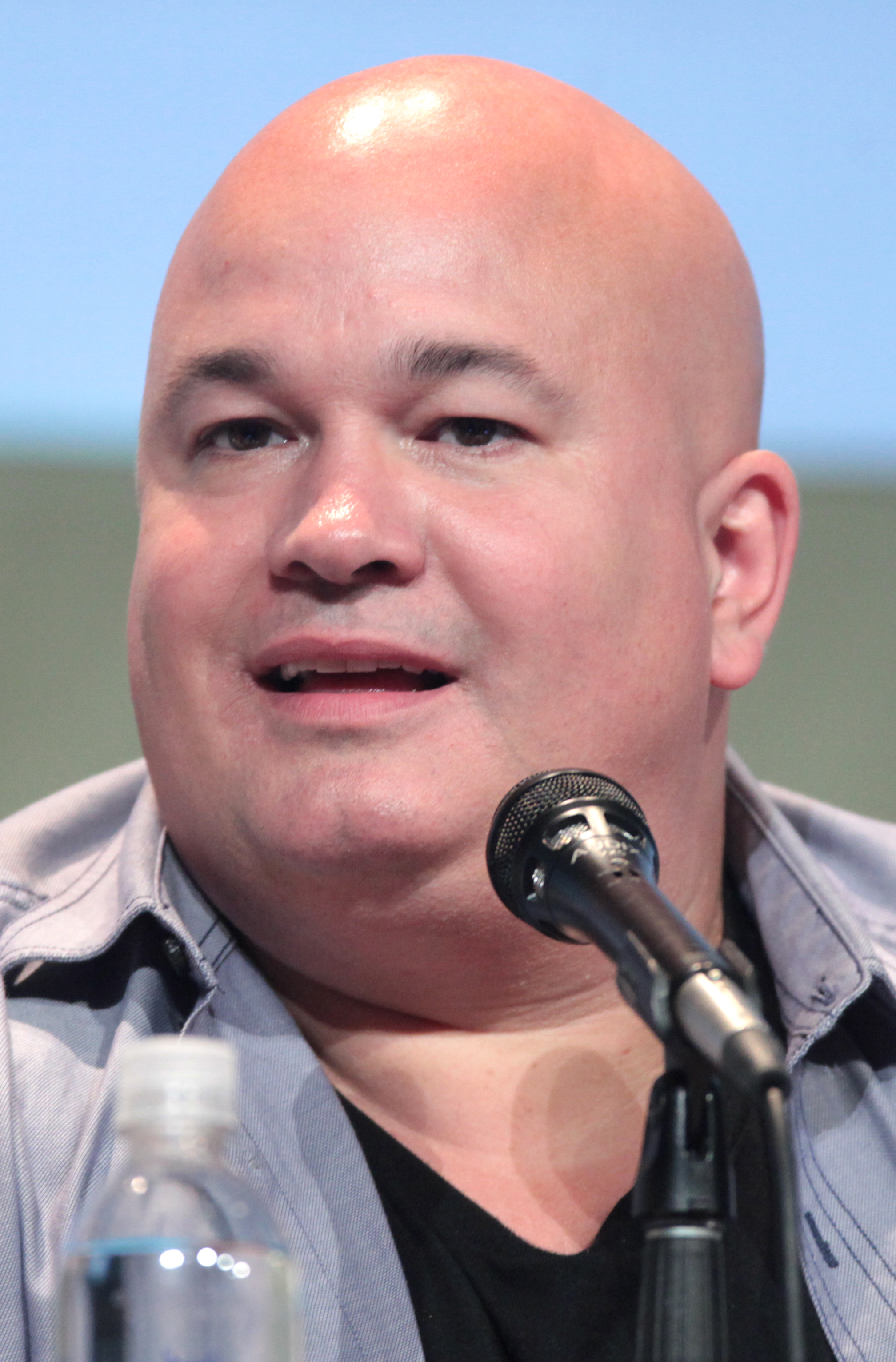
- Kelly in July 2015
- Born: October 8, 1970 (age 56); Medford, Massachusetts, U.S.
- Spouse: Dawn Kelly
- Children: 1

Comedy career
- Years active: 1991–present
- Medium: Stand-up, film, television
- Website: robertkellylive.com

Robert Kelly, is an American stand-up comedian, actor, radio personality, and podcast host.

Kelly frequently performs at the Comedy Cellar. He co-hosts The Bonfire on Sirius XM Satellite Radio, often appeared on The Opie and Anthony Show, and has also appeared on Last Call with Carson Daly, Tough Crowd with Colin Quinn, and Premium Blend. He rose to fame in part by playing Louis C.K.'s brother in Louie.

== Early life ==
Kelly was born in Medford, Massachusetts, three miles from Boston. He was raised in a three-bedroom house with thirteen family members. He is of Irish ancestry, and was raised Catholic.

Kelly is a self-confessed addict. He began drinking at age ten before he quit alcohol and drugs at fifteen. He has remained sober since.

He was arrested as a teenager, and spent time in a youth detention center.

== Career ==
Kelly discovered stand-up comedy in 1987 while attending the International Conference of Young People in Alcoholics Anonymous, after which he began to listen to comedy albums. He performed his first stand-up routine on stage in 1991 at a school talent competition as part of a sketch comedy troupe, Al and the Monkeys. His plan was to enroll at Bunker Hill Community College in Boston to study fine arts, but he became interested in pursuing comedy and quit shortly before he was to earn an associate degree. His first solo performance took place at Catch a Rising Star in Cambridge, Massachusetts, which his family attended.

Before taking on stand-up comedy full-time, Kelly worked several jobs including a waiter, delivering flowers, and working with juvenile delinquents. After his comedy troupe split in the early 1990s, he did not perform stand-up for two years. He lived in Los Angeles for a short time, until he was encouraged to return to the east coast by Patrice O'Neal.

In 1998, Kelly was spotted by an agent through his acting work and went to New York City to further his career.

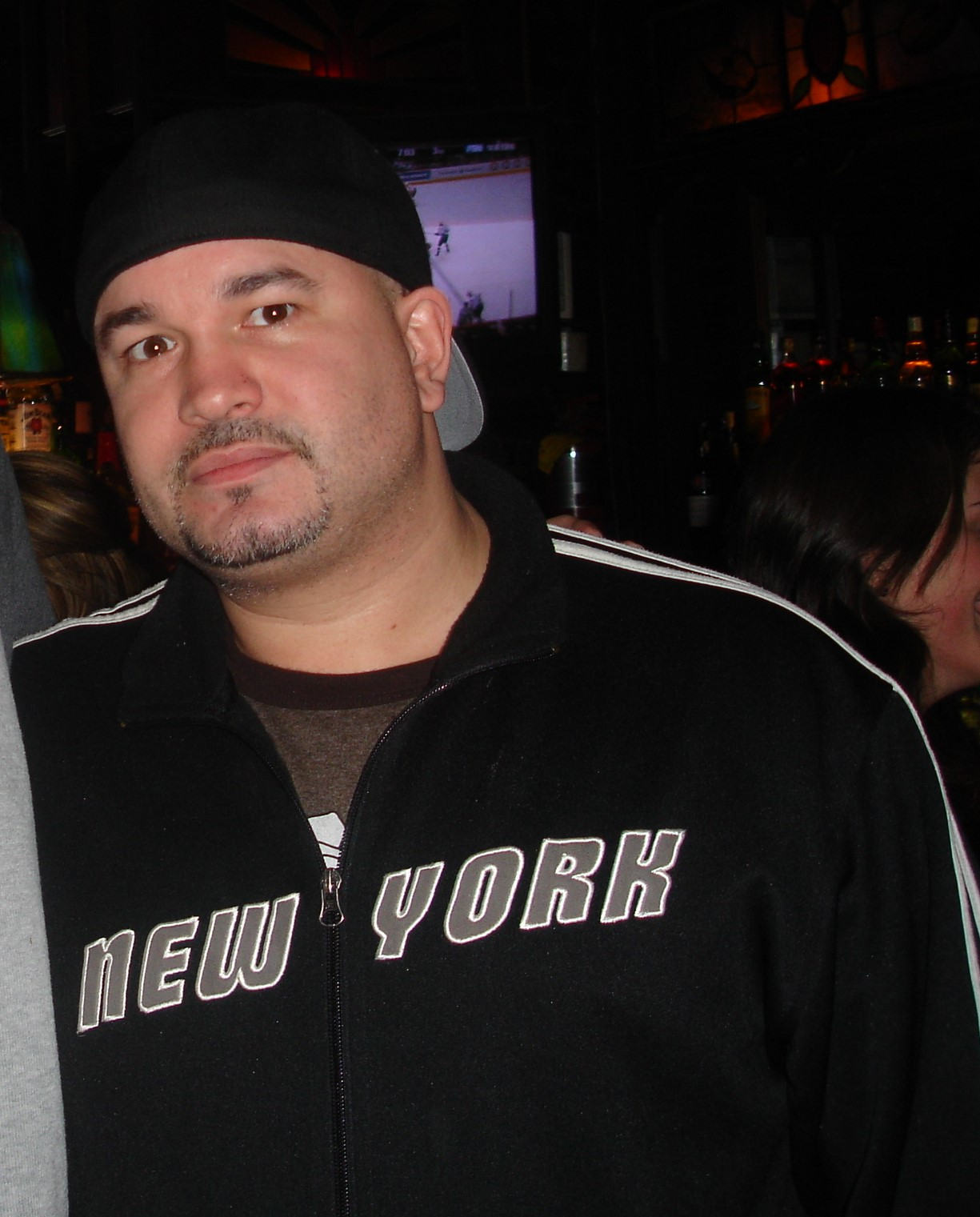
Kelly in 2005

In 2004, he made his first of many appearances on the Opie and Anthony radio show. In 2005, he toured with comedians Dane Cook, Gary Gulman, and Jay Davis on the cross-country tour entitled Tourgasm. After tearing and straining ligaments in his knee, he managed to finish the tour, which began airing on HBO as a comedy documentary series in June 2006. Kelly later toured with Cook and Al Del Bene as part of Cook's Global Thermo Comedy Tour: Isolated Incident.

In 2005 and 2006, Kelly accompanied fellow comedian Colin Quinn to Iraq, where they performed stand-up for American troops stationed in Baghdad.

Kelly was a part of the New Jersey Bamboozle Festival in 2007 as part of the Pass the Mic Comedy Tour on May 6. He also appeared in the 2008 comedy Ghost Town as the ghost of a fat construction worker. That same year, he had a small voice part in the 2008 video game Grand Theft Auto IV as Luca Silvestri, a member of the Pegorino crime family and associate of Ray Boccino, who accompanied the main character in a mission.

From 2010 to 2015, Kelly starred as Louis CK's brother Robbie during the first, fourth, and fifth seasons of the FX sitcom Louie. Kelly rated his performance on the show as among the best of his acting career.

Kelly started his podcast You Know What Dude! in April 2010 on RiotCast, a podcast network that he co-owns. It is recorded weekly in a studio at the Comedy Cellar. Kelly described the podcast as "a true comic hang". It regularly features him curating a discussion with three to five comedians, with an emphasis on honesty and "ball-busting". Regular guests include Dan Soder, Joe List, and Luis J. Gomez. The show was produced until September 2014 by Kelly Fastuca, and has since been produced by Chris Scopo.

In 2012, a comedy book by Kelly, Burr, and Joe DeRosa entitled Cheat: A Man's Guide to Infidelity was released. The book followed a short film that the three wrote named Cheat.

On August 8, 2014, Kelly released the hour-long special Live at the Village Underground, directed by Bobcat Goldthwait. It premiered on Comedy Central in January 2015.

Kelly co-starred in Sex & Drugs & Rock & Roll for two seasons, beginning in 2015. It was his first acting role as a regular cast member, and he took formal drum lessons for the part.

He appears in comedian Ray Harrington's 2015 documentary Be a Man.

In 2023, Kelly began co-hosting the podcast The Regz, a spin-off from his YKWD podcast, alongside comedians Joe List, Luis J. Gomez, and Dan Soder. In that same year Kelly took over hosting duties from Dan Soder on Sirius XM's Bonfire, joining fellow comedian Big Jay Oakerson.

In 2024, Kelly had a supporting role in the film Let's Start a Cult playing Del Harper, the father of lead character Chip Harper, played by Stavros Halkias.

== Personal life ==
In 2015, the family moved from New York City to Westchester, New York.

== Filmography ==
=== Television ===
Year	Title	Role	Notes
1998	The Jim Breuer Show	Himself	
2002	Law & Order: Special Victims Unit	Armando Padilla	Episode: "Vulnerable"
2002–2008	Law & Order: Criminal Intent	Jose Lopez / Detective Ray Valdez	2 episodes
2002	The Job	Luis Somarriba	Episode: "Vacation"
2003	Hack	Jim Cooper	Episode: "Death of Innocence"
2004	Tough Crowd with Colin Quinn	Himself	
2006	Tourgasm	Himself	7 episodes
2008	Comedy Central Presents	Himself	
2009	Law & Order	Bobby	Episode: "Promote This!"
2010–2015	Louie	Bobby / Robbie	8 episodes
2011	Curb Your Enthusiasm	Heckler #1	Episode: "Mister Softee"
2012	NYC 22	George Moore	12 episodes
2013	Inside Amy Schumer	Grunth	Episode: "Unpleasant Truths"
2014	Sirens	Soda Bottle Guy	Episode: "Pilot"
2014	Robert Kelly: Live at the Village Underground	Himself	Stand-up special; also writer and director
2015	Nurse Jackie	Cop	Episode: "Clean"
2015	Maron	Repairman #3	Episode: "The Node"
2015–2016	Sex & Drugs & Rock & Roll	Bam Bam	20 episodes
2015	Benders	EMT Thurber	Episode: "California Here We Come"

=== Film ===
Year	Title	Role	Notes
1997	Last Night at Eddie's	Dillon	
1998	Enough Already	Basketball Player	
1998	Dating Games	Kyle	
2003	8 Guys	Robert	Short film
2007	Good Luck Chuck	Airport Security Guard	
2008	Ghost Town	Construction Worker Ghost	
2008	What Doesn't Kill You	Gas Man	
2009	Children of Invention	Torres	
2011	Cheat	Bobby	Short film
2013	Staten Island Truffle Hunter	Uncle Paulie	Short film
2015	Trainwreck	One-Night Stand Guy	
2018	Unsane	Steve's Partner	
2022	Fourth of July	Bobby	
2024	Let's Start A Cult	Del Harper	

=== Video games ===
Year	Title	Role
2008	Grand Theft Auto IV	Luca Silvestri, The Crowd of Liberty City
2013	Grand Theft Auto V	The Local Population

== Discography ==
- Robert Kelly: Live at the Village Underground (2015)
- For The Love Of Comedy (2013)
- Just the Tip (2008)
- Robert Kelly Live (2003)

== Stand Up Specials ==
Title	Year	Platform
Comedy Central Presents: Robert Kelly	2008	Comedy Central
Robert Kelly: Live at the Village Underground	2015	Comedy Central
Robert Kelly: Kill Box	2022	Robertkellylive.com (Currently on Youtube)
