= Just the Tip =

Live album by Robert Kelly
- Released: April 8, 2008
- Recorded: July 26, 2007
- Genre: Comedy
- Length: 50:31
- Label: Comedy Central Records
- Producer: Robert Kelly

Professional ratings
Review scores
Source	Rating
Allmusic	3/5 stars

Just the Tip is the second album from Irish-American comedian Robert Kelly. It was released on April 8, 2008.

== Description ==
The name comes from a joke on the album, about Kelly's preferred sexual intercourse with a woman. The cover art makes use of this by showing just the top half of his head. The album was recorded on 26 July 2007 at the Comedy Connection in Boston.

The album is packaged with a DVD that contains a "Making of" featurette about the making of the album. It also contains a Comedy Central Presents segment on Kelly.

In April 2008, the album reached the 7th position of Billboard's top chart for comedy albums.

== Track listing ==
No.	Title	Length
1.	"Vegas"	1:27
2.	"Asking Girl to Marry Me"	2:36
3.	"Naked Just Sox"	2:49
4.	"She Knows Nothing About My Penis"	4:54
5.	"Being Chunky"	1:40
6.	"Nickelodeon Award"	4:01
7.	"Food Is My Drug of Choice"	5:02
8.	"Fat Snake"	1:55
9.	"Restaurant"	2:23
10.	"I Like Fat Chicks"	1:47
11.	"Living With Girl"	5:33
12.	"Dude With a Sword"	3:17
13.	"Punching Butter"	4:38
14.	"No Romance"	3:04
15.	"Just the Tip"	5:31

== DVD tracks ==
1. Comedy Central Presents Robert Kelly
2. Making of Just the Tip
