= One Night Stand (American TV series) =

- Genre: Stand-up comedy
- Country of origin: United States
- Original language: English
- No. of seasons: 5
- No. of episodes: 65

Production
- Running time: 30 minutes

Original release
- Network: HBO
- Release: February 15, 1989 – November 15, 1992
- Release: August 19 – October 28, 2005

HBO Presents One Night Stand is an American stand-up comedy television series that aired on HBO. The weekly half-hour series first aired for four seasons from February 15, 1989 to November 15, 1992. It was succeeded by the HBO Comedy Half Hour which ran from June 1994 to January 1998. ONS was revived for one season which aired from August 19 to October 28, 2005.

== Production history ==
=== Original series ===
Comedians who performed on One Night Stand include Susie Essman, Bill Hicks, Bill Maher, Colin Quinn, Dom Irrera, Gilbert Gottfried, Norm Macdonald, Eddie Griffin, Martin Lawrence, D. L. Hughley, Damon Wayans, Larry Miller, Ellen DeGeneres, Charles Fleischer, and George Wallace. This first run of the series ended in 1992, with repeats edited for language and time continuing for years over Comedy Central, a former associate network to HBO.

=== Return ===
One Night Stand returned on August 19, 2005. The series aired each Friday at midnight through October 21, 2005, showing a total of ten half-hour stand-up specials. Some of the comedians included are Louis C.K, Jim Norton, Patrice O'Neal, Bill Burr, Bonnie McFarlane, Kevin Brennan, Omid Djalili, Flight of the Conchords, and more. The 2005 version was directed by Linda Mendoza.

== Episodes ==
=== Season 1 (1989) ===
- Judy Tenuta (episode 1)
- Kevin Meaney (episode 2)
- Joy Behar (episode 3)
- Bob Nelson (episode 4)
- Blake Clarke (episode 5)
- Kevin Pollak (episode 6)
- Rita Rudner (episode 7)
- Bill Maher (episode 8)
- Paula Poundstone (episode 9)
- Dom Irrera (episode 10)
- Barry Sobel (episode 11)
- Damon Wayans (episode 12)

=== Season 2 (1990) ===
- Larry Miller (episode 1)
- Tom Parks (episode 2)
- Ellen DeGeneres (episode 3)
- Robin Harris (episode 4)
- Mike Binder (episode 5)
- Charles Fleischer (episode 6)
- Ritch Shydner (episode 7)
- Jake Johannsen (episode 8)
- Bobby Slayton (episode 9)
- Will Durst (episode 10)
- Diane Ford (episode 11)
- Dennis Wolfberg (episode 12)

=== Season 3 (1991) ===
- Rick Overton (episode 1)
- Rick Aviles (episode 2)
- Mark Curry (episode 3)
- Allan Havey (episode 4)
- Jeff Marder (episode 5)
- Taylor Negron (episode 6)
- Martin Lawrence (episode 7)
- The Higgins Boys and Gruber (episode 8)
- Jimmy Tingle (episode 9)
- Cathy Ladman (episode 10)
- George Wallace (episode 11)
- Bill Hicks (episode 12)
- Norm MacDonald (episode 13)
- Brian Haley (episode 14)
- Michael Colyar (episode 15)

=== Season 4 (1992) ===
- Bill Maher (episode 1)
- Mario Joyner (episode 2)
- Lew Schneider (episode 3)
- John Riggi (episode 4)
- Eddie Griffin (episode 5)
- Ellen DeGeneres (episode 6)
- Allan Havey (episode 7)
- Susie Essman (episode 8)
- Colin Quinn (episode 9)
- Dana Gould (episode 10)
- D.L. Hughley (episode 11)
- Diane Ford (episode 12)
- Dom Irrera (episode 13)
- Gilbert Gottfried (episode 14)
- Jon Hayman (episode 15)
- Joe Bolster (episode 16)

=== Season 5 (2005) ===
- Louis C.K. (episode 1)
- Earthquake (episode 2)
- Kevin Brennan (episode 3)
- Flight of the Conchords (episode 4)
- Bill Burr (episode 5)
- Caroline Rhea (episode 6)
- Omid Djalili (episode 7)
- Patrice O'Neal (episode 8)
- Bonnie McFarlane (episode 9)
- Jim Norton (episode 10)
