= Shorties Watchin' Shorties =

American animated television series on Comedy Central

- Genre: Comedy
- Created by: Jim Serpico; Eric Brown; Tom Sellitti
- Starring: Nick DiPaolo; Patrice O'Neal
- Country of origin: United States
- No. of episodes: 13

Production
- Executive producers: Denis Leary; Jim Serpico; Tom Sellitti (Note: Credited as co-executive producer.); Eric Brown
- Producer: William Perkins
- Running time: 22 minutes
- Production companies: Apostle; World Famous Pictures Animation; Augenblick Studios; Comedy Partners

Original release
- Network: Comedy Central
- Release: April 28 – December 16, 2004

Shorties Watchin' Shorties is an American adult animated comedy television series that aired on Comedy Central from April 28 to December 16, 2004. The show is made up of various short animated clips with audio from comedians' stand up routines. It also features two "shorties," a pair of babies voiced by Nick DiPaolo and Patrice O'Neal who watch and comment upon the routines on TV. For many of the episodes, the babies only stayed in the house, but in later episodes, they were shown walking around the city.

The show featured comedians such as Dane Cook, Bill Burr, Brian Regan, Brian Posehn, Chris Hardwick, Mitch Hedberg, Mike Birbiglia, Jim Gaffigan and Lewis Black.

The animation was scripted and produced at World Famous Pictures and Augenblick Studios. The show was not renewed but full episodes are available on DVD. Clips from the show were posted on the Comedy Central website as well as on Hulu and Netflix. 14 episodes were produced and 13 aired.

== Plot ==
The series is set around in Baby Nick's house. Where when Baby Nick's mom is away, his babysitter is there to watch him along with his best friend who always hangout in his house, Baby Patrice. There they get bored and started to watch animated clips about real-life living people from the routine. Whether it's Dane Cook or Lewis Black.

== Characters ==
=== Main characters ===
- Baby Nick (voiced by Nick DiPaolo) – He is one of the two main characters in the series. He is the best friend of Baby Patrice who likes to watch and comment upon the routines on TV.
- Baby Patrice (voiced by Patrice O'Neal) – He is one of the two main characters in the series. He is the best friend of Baby Nick who also likes to watch and comment upon the routines on TV too.

=== Recurring characters ===
- Babysitter (voiced by Christine Walters) – She is the babysitter to the shorties. She always watches them at home while Baby Nick's mom is away.
- Baby Nick's Mom (voiced by Christine Walters) – She is the mother of Baby Nick. She always leaves for work while calling the babysitter to watch her son and her son's best friend while she's away.

=== Guest stars ===
- Nick DiPaolo as himself
- Dane Cook as himself
- Mike Birbiglia as himself
- Bill Burr as himself
- Adam Ferrara as himself
- Richard Jeni as himself
- Jay Mohr as himself
- Ted Alexandro as himself
- Todd Barry as himself
- Greg Behrendt as himself
- Ed Byrne as himself
- Jeremy Hotz as himself
- Patton Oswalt as himself
- Denis Leary as himself
- Lewis Black as himself
- Mitch Hedberg as himself
- Gilbert Gottfried as himself
- Bobcat Goldthwait as himself
- Kathleen Madigan as herself
- Pablo Francisco as himself
- Jeff Ross as himself
- Eddie Gossling as himself
- Pete Correale as himself
- Richard Belzer as himself
- Brian Regan as himself
- Richard Jeni as himself

== Episodes ==
No.	Title	Written by	Original release date	Prod. code
1	"Cook, Ross, Corbett, Vega"	Jim Serpico, Eric Brown and Tom Sellitti	April 28, 2004	101
Dane Cook gets into the logistics of infidelity, Jeff Ross talks about his elderly relatives and Jonathan Corbett finds the bizarre in marathon running. Guest stars: Dane Cook as himself, Jeff Ross as himself, Jonathan Corbett as himself and Joey Vega as himself.
2	"Burr, Gaffigan, Yannetty, Birbiglia"	Jim Serpico, Eric Brown and Tom Sellitti	May 5, 2004	102
Bill Burr questions guys who kill their wives, Jim Gaffigan shares thoughts on his appearance and Joe Yannetty gives his audience a lesson in California living. Guest stars: Bill Burr as himself, Jim Gaffigan as himself, Joe Yannetty as himself, Mike Birbiglia as himself, and Jeremy Hotz as himself.
3	"Goldthwait, Fitzsimmons, Swardson, Belzer"	Jim Serpico, Eric Brown and Tom Sellitti	May 12, 2004	103
Bobcat Goldthwait takes on a man harassing a polar bear, Greg Fitzsimmons predicts the future of cloning and Nick Swardson ponders Jane Goodall's career choice. Guest stars: Bobcat Goldthwait as himself, Greg Fitzsimmons as himself, Nick Swardson as himself and Richard Belzer as himself.
4	"Mohr, Ferrara, Behrendt, Mastrangelo"	Jim Serpico, Eric Brown and Tom Sellitti	May 19, 2004	104
Jay Mohr explains why satin sheets aren't made for men, Adam Ferrara feels that Jewish people must have the most faith and Greg Behrendt loves Halloween. Guest stars: Jay Mohr as himself, Adam Ferrara as himself and Greg Behrendt as himself.
5	"DiPaolo, Barker, Kreischer, Giraldo"	Jim Serpico, Eric Brown and Tom Sellitti	May 26, 2004	105
Nick DiPaolo isn't exactly having a love affair with the homeless and Arj Barker learned everything about Ireland from soap commercials. Guest stars: Nick DiPaolo as himself, Arj Barker as himself, Bert Kreischer as himself and Greg Giraldo as himself.
6	"Oswalt, Posehn, Finnegan, Madigan"	Jim Serpico, Eric Brown and Tom Sellitti	June 2, 2004	106
Patton Oswalt gets excited for the apocalypse, Brian Posehn shares what makes a good moviegoing experience and Christian Finnegan loves dogs' honesty. Guest stars: Patton Oswalt as himself, Brian Posehn as himself, Christian Finnegan as himself and Kathleen Madigan as herself.
7	"Francisco, Byrne, Collins, Kennedy"	Jim Serpico, Eric Brown and Tom Sellitti	September 8, 2004	107
Pablo Francisco found a reason to actually like movie previews and Ed Byrne ponders America's obsession with teeth. Guest stars: Pablo Francisco as himself, Ed Byrne as himself, Bobby Collins as himself and Dwayne Kennedy as himself.
8	"Oswalt, Hedberg, Caliendo, Morris"	Jim Serpico, Eric Brown and Tom Sellitti	September 15, 2004	108
Patton Oswalt gives his point of view on today's war reporters, Mitch Hedberg finds refuge in Subway sandwich shops and Frank Caliendo loves President Bush. Guest stars: Patton Oswalt as himself, Mitch Hedberg as himself and Frank Caliendo as himself.
9	"Gossling, Burr, Perkins, Yard"	Jim Serpico, Eric Brown and Tom Sellitti	October 28, 2004	109
Eddie Gossling enjoyed being a military child, Bill Burr doesn't have much affection for actors and Dwayne Perkins finds ways to fix the dating scene. Guest stars: Eddie Gossling as himself, Bill Burr as himself and Dwayne Perkins as himself.
10	"Cook, Leary, Regan, Kightlinger"	Jim Serpico, Eric Brown and Tom Sellitti	November 4, 2004	110
Denis Leary hates flying, Brian Regan divulges some childhood experiences and Laura Kightlinger sees the Bush era as the best political climate for drinking. Guest stars: Dane Cook as himself, Denis Leary as himself, Brian Regan as himself and Laura Kightlinger as herself.
11	"Mohr, Henley, Hedberg, Yard"	Jim Serpico, Eric Brown and Tom Sellitti	November 4, 2004	111
Vic Henley explains why George W. Bush should embrace his image and Mitch Hedberg says America's Forest Service should rethink using Smokey Bear as a mascot. Guest stars: Jay Mohr as himself, Vic Henley as himself and Mitch Hedberg as himself.
12	"Cross, Donohue, Corbett, Oschack"	Jim Serpico, Eric Brown and Tom Sellitti	November 11, 2004	112
David Cross decides what he wants done with his dead body, Becky Donohue reflects on her grandmother's stroke and Jonathan Corbett celebrates drinking. Guest stars: David Cross as himself, Becky Donohue as herself and Jonathan Corbett as himself.
13	"Black, Yannetty, Alexandro, Smith"	Jim Serpico, Eric Brown and Tom Sellitti	December 16, 2004	113
Lewis Black notices candy corn becomes an issue every Halloween and Ted Alexandro doesn't quite fit in with the big guys at the gym. Guest stars: Lewis Black as himself, Joe Yannetty as himself and Ted Alexandro as himself. Note: This episode is the series finale.

== See also ==
- The Boss Baby: Back in Business
- Mr. Baby
- Rugrats
