= Gary Gulman =

American stand-up comedian (born 1970)

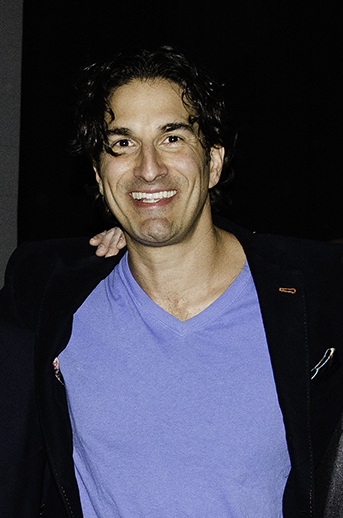
- Gulman at Comics Come Home Event in 2013
- Born: July 17, 1970 (age 56); Peabody, Massachusetts, U.S.
- Education: Boston College

Comedy career
- Years active: 1993–present
- Medium: Stand-up, television
- Genres: Observational comedy; sarcasm; satire
- Subjects: Everyday life, pop culture, childhood, Judaism, mental illness
- Website: garygulman.com

Gary Lewis Weston Gulman (born July 17, 1970) is an American stand-up comedian. He was a finalist on the NBC reality-talent show Last Comic Standing in its second and third seasons. He released his first CD, Conversations with Inanimate Objects in 2005, and his first television special Gary Gulman: Boyish Man the following year. Since then, he has released two other comedy albums and three other comedy specials, including 2019's The Great Depresh on HBO.

== Early life ==
Gulman was born on July 17, 1970, in Peabody, Massachusetts, to Barbara and Philip Gulman. He is the youngest of three brothers, and was raised in a Jewish family. Gulman's parents divorced before he was two years old and his family struggled financially.

Gulman has described himself as a sensitive kid who enjoyed making his friends laugh, drawing and painting, and playing basketball. He attended Peabody Veterans Memorial High School. After his junior year of high school, he was recruited to play football.

Gulman attended Boston College on a football scholarship. He played tight end during his freshman year but later left the team. Gulman credits the time he spent playing football in college as one of the main reasons he recognized and began to seek help for his lifelong struggle with depression and for his later pursuit of a career in comedy. Gulman graduated in 1993 with a degree in accounting, planning to become a CPA like one of his brothers.

After graduating, he worked for two years as an accountant at the Big Six accounting firm Coopers & Lybrand (now PricewaterhouseCoopers), while going to comedy club open mics at night. He then began working as a substitute teacher, where he was well known for trying out his stand-up routines on high-school students before bringing them to the stage at night.

== Career ==
Gulman's comedy centers on absurd observations about daily occurrences. He is one of only a handful of comedians to appear on every major late-night television comedy program, having performed on The Tonight Show with Jay Leno, Late Show with David Letterman, The Late Show with Stephen Colbert, The Late Late Show with Craig Ferguson, Jimmy Kimmel Live!, Conan, Late Night with Seth Meyers, Just for Laughs, and John Oliver's New York Stand-Up Show.

On November 25, 2006, Gulman starred in his own one-hour Comedy Central special titled Gary Gulman: Boyish Man. His second Comedy Central special aired on December 8, 2012, called In This Economy?, followed by It's About Time in 2016 on Netflix and The Great Depresh in 2019 on HBO. His fifth special, Born on Third Base, premiered on Max in December 2023 to critical acclaim.

=== 1993–2003: Early career ===
Gulman began performing at open mics in 1993 in the Boston area. In early 1999, Gulman began to pursue stand-up full time; he moved from his family home in Peabody to Los Angeles where he had received development deals. He worked on developing five different shows during this time but none of them were picked up by a television network.

Gulman performed his first late night stand-up set in 1999 on The Tonight Show with Jay Leno. The following year, he performed on the Late Show with David Letterman.

=== 2003–2012: Touring, Last Comic Standing, and more TV appearances ===
Gulman first came to national attention in 2003 when he was a contestant on the second season of the NBC reality-talent show Last Comic Standing. In season 2, he finished in third place behind John Heffron and Alonzo Bodden. Gulman was also on the third season of the show in 2004. Following Last Comic Standing, Gulman released his first comedy album Conversations with Inanimate Objects. He then appeared in Dane Cook's documentary series Tourgasm which premiered on HBO in 2006; Gulman appeared with fellow comedians Dane Cook, Jay Davis, and Robert Kelly.

Wanting to have more opportunities to perform stand-up, Gulman moved to New York City in 2006. In 2008, Gulman was the host of NESN's Comedy All-Stars. During this period, Gulman performed stand-up on The Tonight Show with Jay Leno (2005), Jimmy Kimmel Live! (2006), Last Call with Carson Daly (2006), The Late Late Show with Craig Ferguson (2007), and Conan (2011), among other shows.

=== 2012–2019: Rise to national prominence ===
In 2012, Gulman released a new Comedy Central special In this Economy? The show was taped in the Wilbur Theatre in Boston, Massachusetts. Following its premiere, he performed on the Late Show with David Letterman for the second time. In May 2014, Gulman had a guest appearance on Inside Amy Schumer. In April of that year, he performed for the first time on Late Night with Seth Meyers and in June 2014 he was the guest on The Pete Holmes Show.

In March 2015, Gulman taped his new special It's About Time. It was released the following year, in May 2016, by Netflix. During the interim time, Gulman was hospitalized for clinical depression; this was not publicly made known at the time.

In January 2017, he performed on The Late Show with Stephen Colbert. In May 2017, he was again hospitalized due to depression. In 2018, he appeared as a fictionalized version of himself on HBO's Crashing and appeared in episode four of HBO's four-part special of the 2 Dope Queens podcast with Jessica Williams and Phoebe Robinson.

During this period, Gulman was on Conan three times (2014, 2015, 2016). The last of those sets, about a fictional documentary on the making of US states' two-letter abbreviations, went viral.

=== 2019–present: The Great Depresh ===
Since January 1, 2019, Gulman has been posting daily tips for aspiring comedians on his Twitter feed. In fall 2019, he was interviewed on both Conan and Late Night with Seth Meyers.

Gulman recorded a HBO special in June 2019, titled The Great Depresh. Judd Apatow served as executive producer. The special premiered on October 5, 2019, and sees Gulman opening up about his depression, anxiety and hospitalization. He has described the show as "a hybrid, where I do some documentary about my recovery, treatment, and my hospitalization, and then I do stand-up surrounding that." It includes conversations with his wife Sadé, his psychiatrist Dr. Richard Friedman, and his mother Barbara, who asked "if Judd Apatow could make her look thinner". Gulman has stated he had "retired from life" because of his crippling depression for more than two years before recovering through treatment and medication. However, he felt very anxious and sad when he got back on stage, and his way of dealing with that was to joke about it, leading to the idea for the special. Gulman credits his psychiatrist with guiding him through medication, treatment and hospitalization, which he was particularly terrified of because all he knew about it previously were the negative depictions of hospitalization like One Flew Over the Cuckoo's Nest and Girl, Interrupted. He has stated that his hospitalization actually "turned out very ordinary, and so helpful" and he hopes that sharing his experience will help to destigmatize medication and therapy.

In 2019, Gulman had a small role as a comedian in the film Joker.

His first book, Misfit: Growing Up Awkward in the '80s (Flatiron Books), was released on September 19, 2023.

His most recent tour is a hour and one-man show: Grandiloquent

== Personal life ==
Gulman has been open about his struggle with depression and anxiety and incorporates it into his comedy.

He is married to his wife Sadé Tametria, with whom he was first seen in 2014. The two live in Harlem in New York.

In recent years, he has taken an interest in studying philosophy.

== Discography ==
Studio albums

- Conversations with Inanimate Objects (2005) (Re-released 2013)
- No Can Defend (2012)

Christmas albums

- All I Want for Chanukah is Christmas! (2010)

Special albums

- Gary Gulman: Boyish Man (2006) – Comedy Central special
- In This Economy? (2012) – Comedy Central special
- It's About Time (2016) – Netflix special
- The Great Depresh (2019) – HBO special
- Born on Third Base (2023) – Max special

== Filmography ==
=== Film ===
Year	Title	Role	Notes
2013	Lucky Them	Craig	
2019	Joker	Comedian	

=== Television ===
Year	Title	Role	Notes
2006	Tourgasm	himself	did a few episode of the first season
2014	Inside Amy Schumer	Judge #1	Episode: "Raise a Glass"
2016	Cop Show	Actor	Episode: "Showdown"
2018	Crashing	Gary	Episode: "Bill Burr"
2022	Life & Beth	Shlomo	4 episodes
