= Tough Crowd with Colin Quinn =

- Genre: Comedy, talk show
- Created by: Colin Quinn
- Starring: Colin Quinn; Nick Di Paolo; Greg Giraldo; Judy Gold; Jim Norton; Patrice O'Neal; Keith Robinson; Rich Vos; Faris Abdin
- Country of origin: United States
- Original language: English
- No. of episodes: 200+

Production
- Executive producers: Colin Quinn; Liz Stanton; Ken Ober
- Running time: 21 minutes

Original release
- Network: Comedy Central
- Release: December 9, 2002 – November 4, 2004

Tough Crowd with Colin Quinn is a comedy talk show that aired on Comedy Central from December 9, 2002 to November 4, 2004. The show featured host Colin Quinn and a panel of comedian guests, discussing politics, current events, and social issues.

== Show history and format ==
In 2002, comedian Colin Quinn was given his own show on NBC, titled The Colin Quinn Show, which was broadcast live from the Saturday Night Live soundstage in New York City. The show only lasted for three episodes. Each of these three episodes aired on successive Mondays from March 11, 2002 to March 25, 2002.

Although NBC canceled the show, Quinn took a similarly-themed show to Comedy Central later on that year. On December 9, 2002, Tough Crowd With Colin Quinn debuted on Comedy Central with an eight-episode test series, which ran Mondays through Thursdays, until December 19, 2002. The show was picked up in January 2003, and the regular series began its 21-week run on March 10, 2003. The show aired weeknights at 11:30 p.m. ET, immediately following The Daily Show with Jon Stewart.

The show was presented as an alternative, unpolished and more accessible political "round-table" discussion/shouting-match program in the manner of CNN's Crossfire, taking cue from Bill Maher's Politically Incorrect. The guests on the panel were usually comedians who had been given topics in advance on which to prepare material. Quinn's regular guests consisted mainly of Comedy Central affiliated comedians from the Comedy Cellar comedy club in New York City. The club was renowned for its postperformance roundtable discussions with comedians in the audience about political issues. These exchanges were the inspiration for Tough Crowd.

The show would open with a monologue by Quinn. Quinn would then stand in front of a pool table, or sit on the edge of it, very often sipping coffee, eating or perusing through a newspaper. Usually, there were four comedians as guests, but sometimes three or five. Quinn would introduce current events and moderate the discussion, which would take up most of the episode. Near the end of each episode, there was usually a sketch of some sort, followed by each of the guests doing a brief monologue on a particular topic that was discussed earlier in the episode.

== Regular guests ==
The show featured many different comedians, including well-known comics such as George Carlin and Jerry Seinfeld and Kevin Hart, but the core group that was regularly rotated into the show's panels and often paired together was:

- Jim David
- Nick DiPaolo
- Greg Giraldo
- Judy Gold
- Jim Norton
- Patrice O'Neal
- Keith Robinson
- Rich Vos

On September 26, 2003, Comedy Central aired an hour-long Tough Crowd-themed stand-up comedy special called Tough Crowd Stands Up hosted by Quinn and featuring sets from show regulars: DiPaolo, Giraldo, Gold, Norton, O'Neal, Robinson, and Vos.

== Episodes ==
- Some episodes and guest lineups are missing, and many specific dates are unknown.

Guest stars	Date	Notes
Nick DiPaolo, Greg Giraldo, Jim Norton, Keith Robinson	Mon, Dec-09, 2002 #001	1 of 8 test shows
Janeane Garafalo, Jim Norton, Nick DiPaolo, T.Sean Shannon	Tue, Dec-10, 2002 #002	2 of 8 test shows. + Christiana Anbri
Nick DiPaolo, Judy Gold, Greg Giraldo, Kevin Hart	Wed, Dec-11, 2002 #003	3 of 8 test shows
Jerry Seinfeld, Sarah Silverman, Greg Giraldo, Jim Norton	Thu, Dec-12, 2002 #004	4 of 8 test shows
Judy Gold, Jim Norton, Rich Vos, Keith Robinson	Mon, Dec-16, 2002 #005	5 of 8 test shows
Denis Leary, Susie Essman, Nick DiPaolo, Greg Giraldo	Tue, Dec-17, 2002 #006	6 of 8 test shows
Nick DiPaolo, Greg Giraldo, Patrice O'Neal, Sue Costello	Wed, Dec-18, 2002 #007	7 of 8 test shows
Keith Robinson, Nick DiPaolo, Jim Norton, Greg Giraldo	Thu, Dec-19, 2002 #008	8 of 8 test shows
Sue Costello, Greg Giraldo, Keith Robinson, Rich Vos	Mon, Mar-10, 2003 #009	1st official ep. + Nick DiPaolo, Bryan Tucker
Nick DiPaolo, Greg Giraldo, Judy Gold, Patrice O'Neal	Tue, Mar-11, 2003 #010	
Nick DiPaolo, Marc Maron, Jim Norton, Sarah Silverman	Wed, Mar-12, 2003 #011	
Jim David, Nick DiPaolo, Patrice O'Neal, Sarah Silverman	Thu, Mar-13, 2003 #012	
Greg Giraldo, Bonnie McFarlane, Jim Norton, Keith Robinson	Mon, Mar-17, 2003 #013	
Dave Chappelle, Nick DiPaolo, Greg Fitzsimmons, Judy Gold	Tue, Mar-18, 2003 #014	
Sue Costello, Nick DiPaolo, Greg Giraldo, Reggie McFadden	Wed, Mar-19, 2003 #015	Iraq war begins (8 PM ET)
Jim David, Patrice O'Neal, Greg Giraldo, Jim Norton	Thu, Mar-20, 2003 #016	1st day of Iraq war
Hood, Jim Norton, Nick DiPaolo, D.L. Hughley	Mon, Mar-24, 2003 #017	
Jeff Foxworthy, Patrice O'Neal, Greg Giraldo, George Wallace	Tue, Mar-25, 2003 #018	
Nick DiPaolo, Hugh Fink, Greg Giraldo, Wanda Sykes	Wed, Mar-26, 2003 #019	
David Alan Grier, Denis Leary, Keith Robinson, Judy Gold	Thu, Mar-27, 2003 #020	
Jim Norton, Patrice O'Neal, Greg Proops, Jimmy Shubert	Mon, Mar-31, 2003 #021	
Greg Giraldo, Judy Gold, Eddie Izzard, Chris Rock	Tue, Apr-01, 2003 #022	
Richard Jeni, Lisa Lampanelli, Patrice O'Neal, Rich Vos	Wed, Apr-02, 2003 #023	
Greg Giraldo, Jim Norton, Keith Robinson, Donnell Rawlings	Thu, Apr-03, 2003 #024	
Mario Cantone, Doctor Dré, Greg Giraldo, Kevin Meaney	Mon, Apr-07, 2003 #025	
Thea Vidale, Nick DiPaolo.	Tue, Apr-08, 2003 #026	
Dave Attell, Greg Giraldo, Robert Kelly, Patrice O'Neal	Wed, Apr-09, 2003 #027	+ Vincent Pastore
Ellen Cleghorne, Nick DiPaolo, Jim Norton, Jon Stewart	Thu, Apr-10, 2003 #028	
No new shows, week of April 14; Live shows return April 21		
Scott Thompson, Nick DiPaolo, Judy Gold	Mon, Apr-21, 2003 #029	
Lewis Black, Bill Burr, Greg Giraldo, Keith Robinson	Tue, Apr-22, 2003 #030	
Jim Norton, Ken Ober, Rich Vos, Patrice O'Neal	Wed, Apr-23, 2003 #031	+ Nick DiPaolo
Hugh Fink, Nick DiPaolo, Greg Giraldo, Macio	Thu, Apr-24, 2003 #032	
Pat Cooper, Greg Giraldo, Allan Havey, Patrice O'Neal	Mon, Apr-28, 2003 #033	
Paul Mooney, Jim Norton, Keith Robinson, Nick DiPaolo	Tue, Apr-29, 2003 #034	+ Illeana Douglas
Graham Norton, Greg Giraldo, Judy Gold, Rich Vos	Wed, Apr-30, 2003 #035	
Aisha Tyler, Jim Norton, Nick DiPaolo, Jim David	Thu, May-01, 2003 #036	
Adam Ferrara, Greg Giraldo, Jim Norton, Patrice O'Neal	Mon, May-05, 2003 #037	
Nick DiPaolo, Keith Robinson, Brian Posehn, Judy Gold	Tue, May-06, 2003 #038	
Denis Leary, Lenny Clarke, Sue Costello, Greg Giraldo	Wed, May-07, 2003 #039	
Rich Vos, Graham Norton, Susie Essman, Mike Britt	Thu, May-08, 2003 #040	
Greg Giraldo, Laura Kightlinger, Jimmy Kimmel, Todd Lynn	Mon, May-12, 2003 #041	
Todd Barry, Nick DiPaolo, Jim Norton, Keith Robinson	Tue, May-13, 2003 #042	+ John F. O'Donohue
David Alan Grier, Rich Hall, George Wallace, Lizz Winstead	Wed, May-14, 2003 #043	
Greg Fitzsimmons, Laurie Kilmartin, Greg Giraldo, Patrice O'Neal	Thu, May-15, 2003 #044	
Dom Irrera, Sarah Silverman, Keith Robinson, Greg Giraldo	Mon, May-19, 2003 #045	
Sue Murphy, Colette Hawley, Nick DiPaolo, Judy Gold	Tue, May-20, 2003 #046	
Kevin Meaney, Patrice O'Neal, Gregg Rogell, Rudy Rush	Wed, May-21, 2003 #047	+ Colin's Doorman Steve; Avis Cardella
Jim Norton, Rich Vos, Jim David, Vanessa Hollingshead	Thu, May-22, 2003 #048	
Tough Cuts, Volume 1 — Live shows return June 2		"Best of" clip show from episodes to date
Greg Giraldo, Cory Kahaney, Maurice, Rich Vos	Mon, June-02, 2003 #049	+ Dante Nero, Jim Norton, Keith Robinson
Pat Cooper, Pete Correale, Patrice O'Neal, Tom Papa	Tue, June-03, 2003 #050	
Greer Barnes, Stephen Colbert, Greg Giraldo, Jim Norton	Wed, June-04, 2003 #051	+ Keith Robinson, Rich Vos
Louis C.K., Nick DiPaolo, Paul Mecurio, Keith Robinson	Thu, June-05, 2003 #052	
Nick DiPaolo, Jamie Kennedy, Carlos Mencia, Patton Oswalt	Mon, June-09, 2003 #053	
Lewis Black, Greg Giraldo, Dom Irrera, Patrice O'Neal	Tue, June-10, 2003 #054	Palestinian Roast
Dave Attell, Laurie Kilmartin, Jim Norton, Keith Robinson	Wed, June-11, 2003 #055	
Hood, Ken Ober, Modi, Ahmed Ahmed	Thu, June-12, 2003 #056	
Susie Essman, Greg Giraldo, Keith Robinson, Marc Cohen	Mon, June-16, 2003 #057	
Louis CK, Laura Dinnebeil, Rick Shapiro, Dan Vitale	Tue, June-17, 2003 #058	
Ellen Cleghorne, Dane Cook, Nick DiPaolo, Jay Mohr	Wed, June-18, 2003 #059	
Rich Francese, Kathleen Madigan, Jim Norton, Tony Woods	Thu, June-19, 2003 #060	
Judy Gold, Jake Johannsen, Andy Kindler, Louis Ramey	Mon, June-23, 2003 #061	
Allan Havey	Tue, June-24, 2003 #062	
Cory Kahaney, Keith Robinson, David Feldman, Jim David	Wed, June-25, 2003 #063	
George Carlin, Nick DiPaolo, Greg Giraldo, Jim Norton	Thu, June-26, 2003 #064	
Tough Cuts, Volume 2 — Live shows return July 21		"Best of" clip show from episodes since Vol.1
Ian Bagg, Bill Burr, Patrice O'Neal, Greg Proops	Mon, July-21, 2003 #065	
Lewis Black	Tue, July-22, 2003 #066	
Nick DiPaolo, Dom Irrera, Carole Montgomery, Scott Thompson	Wed, July-23, 2003 #067	+ Godfrey
Ray Garvey, Greg Giraldo, Jim Norton, William Stephenson	Thu, July-24, 2003	
	Mon, July-28, 2003	
	Tue, July-29, 2003	
	Wed, July-30, 2003	
	Thu, July-31, 2003	
	Mon, Aug-04, 2003	
	Tue, Aug-05, 2003	
	Wed, Aug-06, 2003	
	Thu, Aug-07, 2003	
Carrot Top	Mon, Aug-11, 2003	
Bobby Collins, Sherry Davey, Bobby Slayton, Doug Stanhope	Tue Aug-12, 2003	
	Wed, Aug-13, 2003	
No new show	Thu, Aug-14, 2003	Northeast blackout 4:10 pm ET
Nick DiPaolo, Scott Thompson, Jim David, Greg Giraldo	Mon, Aug-18, 2003	Blackout recap
	Tue, Aug-19, 2003	
	Wed, Aug-20, 2003	
	Thu, Aug-21, 2003	
No new shows until Sept. 8th		
	Mon, Sept-08, 2003	
	Tue, Sept-09, 2003	
Jim Norton, Ben Stein, Greg Giraldo, Wali Collins	Wed, Sept-10, 2003	
	Thu, Sept-11, 2003	
Eddie Brill, Jackie Kashian, Keith Robinson, Rich Vos	Mon, Sept-15, 2003	
	Tue, Sept-16, 2003	
Dave Attell, Lewis Black, Stephen Colbert, Nick DiPaolo	Wed, Sept-17, 2003	+ Jim Norton, Patrice O'Neal, Keith Robinson
Greg Giraldo, Jake Johanssen, Lynne Koplitz, Jim Norton	Thu, Sept-18, 2003	
Judy Gold, Dave Mordal, Jim Norton, Joe Rogan	Mon, Sept-22, 2003	
Nick DiPaolo, Todd Glass, Jimmy Martinez, Keith Robinson	Tue, Sept-23, 2003	+ Jim Norton, Keith Robinson
Richard Belzer, Greg Giraldo, Rene Hicks, James Smith	Wed, Sept-24, 2003	
Flex Alexander, Kevin Hart, Dante Nero, Patrice O'Neal	Thu, Sept-25, 2003	+ Jim Norton, Keith Robinson
No new show until Oct. 20th		
	Mon, Oct-20, 2003	
Bob Golub, Cory Kahaney, Greg Proops, Rich Vos	Tue, Oct-21, 2003	
	Wed, Oct-22, 2003	
	Thu, Oct-23, 2003	
Nick DiPaolo, Colette Hawley, Keith Robinson, George Wallace	Mon, Oct-27, 2003	
Marc Maron, Jim Norton, Rich Vos, Mishna Wolff	Tue, Oct-28, 2003	+ Steve Schirripa
Greg Giraldo, Dom Irrera, Ed Lover, Patrice O'Neal	Wed, Oct-29, 2003	
Louis C.K., Dom Irrera, Marc Maron, Ken Ober	Thu, Oct-30, 2003	+ Jerry Seinfeld
Scott Thompson, Keith Robinson, Kevin Nealon, Judy Gold	Mon, Nov-03, 2003	
Maria Bamford, Jim David, Jim Norton, Scott Thompson	Tue, Nov-04, 2003	
Patrice O'Neal, Greg Giraldo, Stuttering John Melendez	Wed, Nov-05, 2003	
Nick DiPaolo, Don Gavin, Steve Sweeney, Jimmy Tingle	Thu, Nov-06, 2003	+ Keith Robinson
Franklyn Ajaye, Greg Giraldo, Kathy Griffin, Jim Norton	Mon, Nov-10, 2003	
Nick DiPaolo, Judy Gold, Patrice O'Neal, Keith Robinson	Tue, Nov-11, 2003	+ Rich Vos. 100th episode
Andrew Dice Clay, Jim Florentine, Rich Vos, Lizz Winstead	Wed, Nov-12, 2003	+ Sarah Silverman. 101st episode
Jim David, Robert Kelly, Jimmy Martinez, Bernadette Pauley	Thu, Nov-13, 2003	+ Jim Norton. 102nd episode
Becky Donohue, Judah Friedlander, Greg Giraldo, Keith Robinson	Mon, Nov-17, 2003	
	Tue, Nov-18, 2003	
Lewis Black, Ardie Fuqua, Greg Giraldo, Matt Walsh	Wed, Nov-19, 2003	+ Nick DiPaolo
Dov Davidoff, Lea DeLaria, Jim Norton, Patrice O'Neal	Thu, Nov-20, 2003	Thanksgiving episode
Ross Bennett, Nick DiPaolo, Todd Glass, Rich Francese	Nov-2003	
Kerri Louise, Howie Mandel, Jim Norton, Robert Schimmel	2003	
Greg Giraldo, Todd Lynn, Andrew Maxwell, Patrice O'Neal	2003	
D.C. Benny, Greg Proops, Keith Robinson, Alexandra Wentworth	Dec-2003	+ Greg Giraldo, Modi
Nick DiPaolo, Ray Garvey, Macio, Greg Proops	Dec-2003	+ Keith Robinson, Rich Vos
Nick DiPaolo, Greg Giraldo, Artie Lange, Lizz Winstead	Dec-2003	+ Judy Gold, Jim Norton, Keith Robinson
Goumba Johnny, Patrice O'Neal, Dat Phan, Rich Vos	Dec-2003	
Bill Burr, Nick DiPaolo, Keith Robinson, George Wallace		
Dave Attell, Lewis Black, Greg Giraldo, Jim Norton		
Greg Giraldo, Vic Henley, Robert Klein, Keith Robinson		
Nick DiPaolo, Greg Giraldo, Judy Gold, Patrice O'Neal		
Jim David, Greg Giraldo, Jim Norton, Patrice O'Neal		
Wayne Federman, Greg Giraldo, Kathy Griffin, Scott Thompson		+ Jim Norton
John DiResta, Judy Gold, Ralphie May, Keith Robinson		
Pat Cooper, Mitch Fatel, Greg Giraldo, Keith Robinson		
Nick Gaza, Judy Gold, Jim Norton, Patrice O'Neal	Sept-2004	
Greg Giraldo, Todd Lynn, Greg Proops, Keith Robinson		
Ben Bailey, Ty Barnett, Nick DiPaolo, Keith Robinson		
Todd Barry, Vinnie Brand, Greg Giraldo, Jim Norton		
Nick DiPaolo, John Mendoza, Patrice O'Neal, T.Sean Shannon		
Marc Maron, Patrice O'Neal, Barry Weintraub, Alexandra Wentworth		
Jim David, Robert Klein, Patrice O'Neal, Tom Papa		
Kevin Brennan, Nick DiPaolo, David Feldman, Jim Norton	March 2004	
Dane Cook, Robert Kelly, Howie Mandel, Patrice O'Neal		
Bruce Bruce, Greg Giraldo, Keith Robinson, Tim Young		
Vinnie Brand, Jim Norton, Patrice O'Neal, Greg Proops		
John Joseph, Jim Norton, Dina Pearlman, Keith Robinson		
Judy Gold, Drew Hastings, Laurie Kilmartin, Jim Norton		
Greg Giraldo, Judy Gold, Todd Lynn, Patrice O'Neal		
Laurie Kilmartin, Lynne Koplitz, Keith Robinson, Gregg Rogell		
Greg Giraldo, Todd Glass, Patrice O'Neal, Paul F. Tompkins		
Greg Giraldo, Ralphie May, Patrice O'Neal, Jeffrey Ross		
Sue Costello, Jim Norton, Patrice O'Neal, Pauly Shore		
Susie Essman, Jeff Garlin, Rich Hall, Patrice O'Neal	Jan-19, 2004	
Nick DiPaolo, Adam Ferrara, Denis Leary, Patrice O'Neal		
Nick DiPaolo, Marc Maron, Pete Tubbs, Rich Vos		
Sherry Davey, Nick DiPaolo, Graham Norton, Greg Proops		
Rick Crom, Dom Irrera, Jim Norton, Keith Robinson		
Mike Britt, Jim Norton, Patrice O'Neal		Rare 3-guest show
Pat Cooper, Kevin Hart, Todd Lynn, Keith Robinson		+ Nick DiPaolo, Michael Olajide
Nick DiPaolo, Greg Giraldo, Mo Rocca, T.Sean Shannon		
Susie Essman, Jim Gaffigan, Greg Giraldo, Judy Gold		
Tough Cuts, Volume 3		"Best of" clip show: "The CQ Awards"
Judy Gold, Hood, Dan Naturman, Patrice O'Neal	2004	+ Jim Norton
Nick DiPaolo, Greg Giraldo, Lynne Koplitz, Todd Lynn	2004	
Omid Djalili, Graham Norton, Jim Norton, Patrice O'Neal	Wed, Feb-04, 2004	+ Nick DiPaolo
Buddy Bolton, Nick DiPaolo, Greg Giraldo, Lynne Koplitz, Todd Lynn	2004	+ Extra comedian (5 total)
Marc Maron, Jim Norton, Keith Robinson, Rich Vos	2004	
Sue Costello, Robert Kelly, Patrice O'Neal, Keith Robinson	2004	+ Rich Vos
Louis C.K., Paul Mecurio, Graham Norton, Rich Vos	2004	
Marc Maron, Jackie Mason, Jim Norton, Patrice O'Neal	Wed, Mar-17, 2004	
Steve Byrne, Lenny Clarke, Judy Gold, Jimmy Tingle	Thu, Mar-18, 2004	
Rich Francese, Lynne Koplitz, Patrice O'Neal, Jim Mendrinos	Wed, Mar-24, 2004	
Jim David, Marc Maron, Patton Oswalt, Rich Vos	2004	
Ross Bennett, Sue Murphy, Jim Norton, Keith Robinson, Hal Sparks	June 2004	
Nick DiPaolo, Patrice O'Neal, Fran Solomita, Tony V	2004	
Drew Fraser, Cory Kahaney, Kathleen Madigan, Ralphie May	2004	+ Nick DiPaolo, Patrice O'Neal, Michael Walker
Greg Giraldo, Judy Gold, Maz Jobrani, Tony V	Apr-12, 2004	
Mark Ebner, Greg Fitzsimmons, Cory Kahaney, Keith Robinson	Apr-13, 2004	
Nick DiPaolo, Ralphie May, Jim Norton, Jeffrey Ross	Apr-14, 2004	
Marc Maron, Jim Norton, Patton Oswalt, Rich Vos	Apr-26, 2004	
Pat Cooper, Leighann Lord, Patrice O'Neal, Frankie Pace	Apr-27, 2004	+ Rich Vos
Dave Attell, Greg Behrendt, Greg Giraldo, Tom Papa	Apr-28, 2004	
Jim David, Nick DiPaolo, David Feldman, Lynne Koplitz	Apr-29, 2004	
Ted Alexandro, Judy Gold, Jim Norton, T.Sean Shannon	May-03, 2004	+ Nick DiPaolo, Greg Giraldo
Mike Britt, Pete Correale, Greg Giraldo, Keith Robinson	May-04, 2004	
Ellen Cleghorne, Nick DiPaolo, Jim Florentine, Penn Jillette	May-05, 2004	
Tony Camin, Dov Davidoff, Robert Kelly, Patrice O'Neal	May-06, 2004	
Tough Cuts, Volume 4		"Best of" clip show from episodes to date
Nick DiPaolo, Robert Kelly, Patrice O'Neal, Tom Papa, Mike Sweeney	June-02, 2004	
Ellen Cleghorne, D.L. Hughley, Keith Robinson, Sheryl Underwood	June-03, 2004	
Nick DiPaolo, Greg Giraldo, Scott Thompson, Alexandra Wentworth	Mon, June-07, 2004	
Jim Florentine, Marc Maron, Carrot Top, Rich Vos	Tue, June-08, 2004	+ Jim Norton, Keith Robinson
Nick DiPaolo, Susie Essman, Jim Norton, Patrice O'Neal	Wed, June-09, 2004	
Judy Gold, Marc Maron, Graham Norton, Keith Robinson	Thu, June-10, 2004	
Jim Gaffigan, Greg Giraldo, Jim Norton, Frank Santorelli	June-14, 2004	
Lewis Black, Nick DiPaolo, Bonnie McFarlane, Rich Vos	June-15, 2004	
Greg Giraldo, Kyle Grooms, Todd Lynn, Jim Norton	2004	
Jeff Cesario, Pat Cooper, Nick DiPaolo, Keith Robinson	2004	
Judy Gold, Chris Murphy, Jim Norton, Keith Robinson	2004	+ Rich Vos
Nick DiPaolo, Greg Giraldo, Laurie Kilmartin, Al Lubel	2004	
Jim David, Nick DiPaolo, Kevin Hart, Barry Weintraub	2004	
Judy Gold, Kevin Hart, Keith Robinson, Frank Vignola	2004	+ Jim Norton
Greg Giraldo, Bernadette Pauley, Keith Robinson, Jimmy Shubert	2004	
Karen Bergreen, Marc Maron, Patrice O'Neal, Rich Vos	2004	
Laurie Kilmartin, Marc Maron, Patrice O'Neal, Keith Robinson	2004	+ D.C. Benny
Lenny Clarke, Kevin Hart, Jim Norton, Patrice O'Neal	July-22, 2004	
Ross Bennett, Nick DiPaolo, Greg Giraldo, Rick Shapiro	2004	
Greg Giraldo, Lynne Koplitz, Todd Lynn, Jim Norton	2004	
Nick DiPaolo, Greg Giraldo, Jim Norton, Patrice O'Neal, Rich Vos	Wed, July-28, 2004	200th episode
Dave Attell, Louis C.K., Nick DiPaolo, Jim Norton	Wed, Aug-25, 2004	
Nick DiPaolo, Marc Maron, Tim Meadows, Sheryl Underwood	Wed, Sept-01, 2004	+ Patrice O'Neal
Tom Cotter, John Fugelsang, Lynne Koplitz, Patrice O'Neal	Thu, Sept-02, 2004	+ Nick DiPaolo
Kevin Hart, Robert Kelly, John Marshall, Patrice O'Neal	Oct-06, 2004	
Dave Attell, Greg Giraldo, Judy Gold, Kevin Hart	Tue, Nov-01, 2004	
Jim David, Nick DiPaolo, Marc Maron, Rich Vos	Wed, Nov-03, 2004	
Nick DiPaolo, Greg Giraldo, Jim Norton, Patrice O'Neal, Keith Robinson	Thu, Nov-04, 2004	Final episode

== Series finale and epilogue ==
Jim Norton addressed the program's demise on his blog, where he mentioned that Comedy Central would send down notes to the show discouraging the predominant focus on political topics and discussions about race and ethnic issues. The network claimed this was only because they already had scripted/talk programming that addressed these issues, referring to The Daily Show with Jon Stewart and Chappelle's Show, and warned that some of the views expressed on Tough Crowd did not appeal to the demographics at which Comedy Central's current business model was aimed.

The last show contained emotional monologues by Quinn, who attacked his detractors (such as The New York Times) as being hypocritical and elitist for their negative reviews. He also defined "comedic integrity" as the ability to critique the hypocrisy of society, but to be honest enough to admit that you are just as guilty of it as anyone else. The implication was that many political comedians spend all their time criticizing society and others, but rarely themselves.
