= Joe List =

American comedian and actor (born 1982)

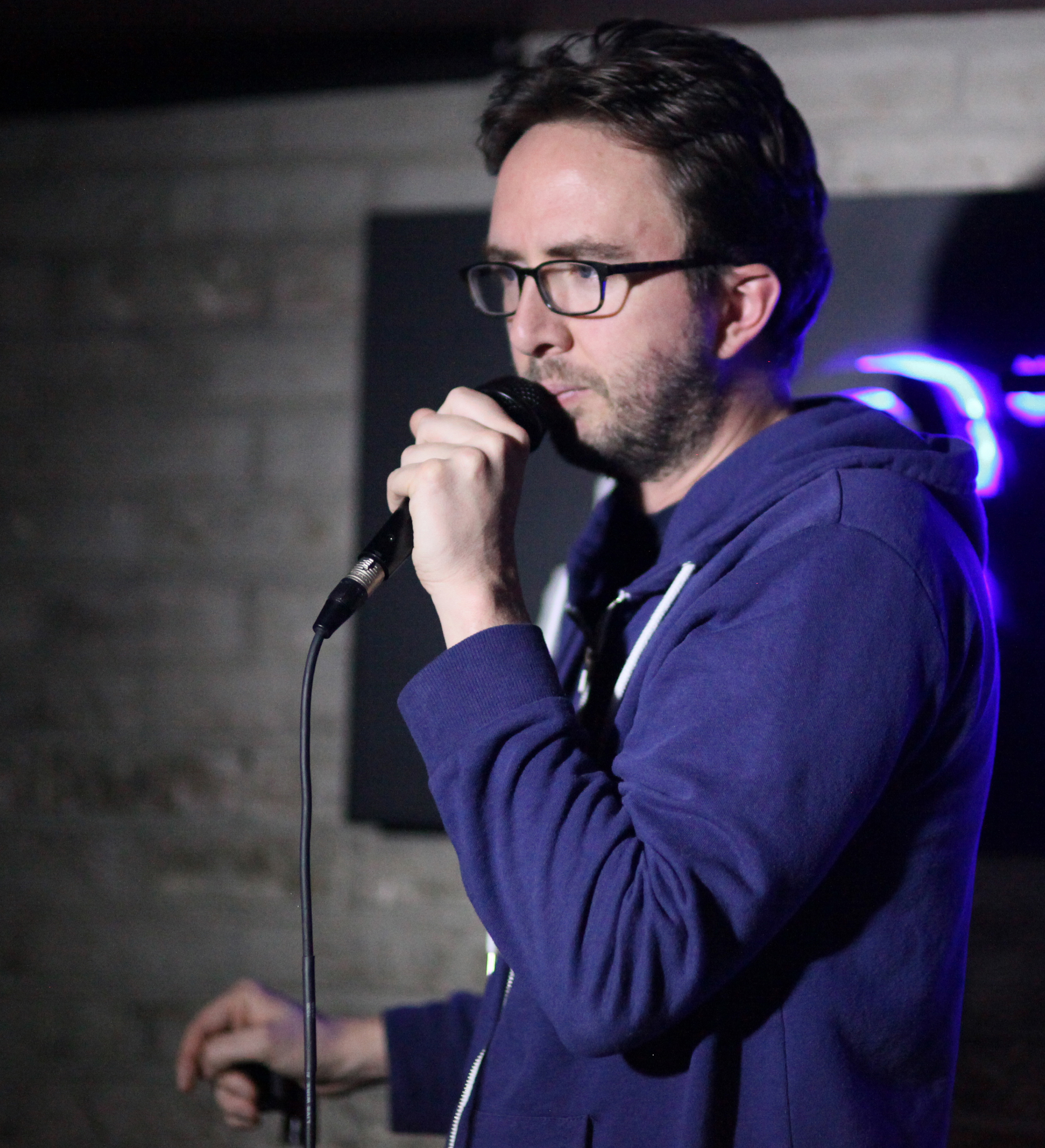
- List performing in December 2016
- Born: Joseph Albert List; April 6, 1982 (age 44); Stoughton, Massachusetts, U.S.
- Other names: Bird with glasses, Eggmouth
- Occupations: Comedian; actor; podcast host
- Years active: 2000–present
- Spouse: Sarah Tollemache (m. 2017)
- Children: 1
- Website: comedianjoelist.com

Joseph Albert List (born April 6, 1982) is an American comedian and actor.

== Early life ==
Joseph Albert List was born in Stoughton, Massachusetts on April 6, 1982, and grew up in Whitman, Massachusetts. He began performing stand-up comedy in Boston, Massachusetts in 2000, shortly after graduating from high school.

== Career ==
List has released two stand-up comedy albums, So Far No Good (2013), Are You Mad at Me? (2016). He has been featured on Conan and The Late Show with David Letterman. In 2015, he was a finalist on NBC's Last Comic Standing and recorded a half-hour comedy special on Comedy Central.

List has been a co-host of the weekly podcast Tuesdays with Stories alongside fellow comedian Mark Normand since early 2014. More recently, he has also hosted the Mindful Metal Jacket podcast and the Joe and Raanan Talk Movies podcast with comedian Raanan Hershberg. He is also a regular on Robert Kelly's podcast You Know What Dude.

In 2016, List toured the U.S. and Europe while opening for Louis C.K., which included three performances at Madison Square Garden. He is a regular at the Comedy Cellar in New York City.

In 2024, List began co-hosting the podcast The Regz, alongside comedians Dan Soder, Luis J. Gomez, and Robert Kelly.

List released a special for Netflix's The Standups in 2018. His next special, I Hate Myself, was self-produced and premiered on Comedy Central's YouTube channel in August 2020. In April 2022, he released a one-hour comedy special on his YouTube channel called This Year's Material. In August 2023, he released another one-hour special on YouTube called Enough for Everybody. In 2025, List released another comedy special on YouTube, Small Ball.

In 2022, he co-wrote (with Louis C.K.) and starred in Fourth of July, a comedy-drama film directed and produced by Louis C.K. In 2024, List directed and featured in the documentary Tom Dustin: Portrait of a Comedian.

== Personal life ==
List is a recovering alcoholic and has been sober since 2012.

In 2017, List married Sarah Tollemache, a fellow comedian from Kingwood, Texas. They had a son in November 2023. They battled against each other on an episode of Jeff Ross Presents Roast Battle.

== Discography ==
- So Far No Good (2011)
- Are You Mad at Me? (2016)
- I Hate Myself (2020)
- This Year's Material (2022)
- Enough for Everybody (2023)
- Small Ball (2025)

== Filmography ==
Year	Title	Role	Notes
2020	I Hate Myself	himself	Comedy Central stand-up special
2022	Fourth of July	Jeff	
2022	This Year's Material	himself	YouTube stand-up special
2023	Civic Duty		Short film
2023	Enough for Everybody	himself	YouTube stand-up special
2024	Stuck in Park		Short film
2024	Tom Dustin: Portrait of a Comedian	Director/Himself	Documentary
2024	Anxiety Club	himself	Documentary
2025	Small Ball	himself	YouTube stand-up special
