= Patrice O'Neal: Elephant in the Room =

2011 American comedy film

Elephant in the Room
- Directed by: Beth McCarthy
- Produced by: John Irwin; Patrice O'Neal
- Starring: Patrice O'Neal
- Edited by: A.J. Dickerson
- Music by: Vondecarlo Brown
- Production company: Comedy Central Films
- Distributed by: Comedy Central
- Release date: February 19, 2011
- Running time: 77 minutes
- Country: United States
- Language: English

Elephant in the Room is a stand-up comedy special by American comedian Patrice O'Neal, released by Comedy Central. It premiered on February 19, 2011, nine months before O'Neal's death. It is the comedian's only "hour-length" special and his first to be released on DVD or CD. The DVD was released by Comedy Central on February 22, 2011. Although the original televised version ran only 42 minutes (an hour with commercials), the full-length edit released on DVD and Netflix's streaming service runs at 77 minutes. The DVD includes additional "deleted scenes", as well as O'Neal's 2003 Comedy Central Presents, available on DVD for the first time.
