= Break a Leg (web series) =

- Film poster
- Genre: Comedy
- Created by: Yuri Baranovsky; Vlad Baranovsky
- Directed by: Yuri Baranovsky; Justin Morrison
- Starring: Yuri Baranovsky; Justin Morrison; Daniel George; Daniela DiIorio; Alexis Boozer; Drew Lanning; Chad Yarish; Skip Emerson; Flynn Kelleher
- Country of origin: United States
- Original language: English
- No. of episodes: 17

Production
- Running time: 7–30 minutes

Break a Leg is an American independently-created comedy web series. The show is filmed in the handheld, one-camera style associated with mockumentaries such as The Office.

Unlike many other internet web series, some episodes of Break a Leg are as long as those of television sitcoms, at around 30 minutes.

== Premise and setting ==
The show is about a writer named David Penn, whose sitcom has been picked up for production. The viewer also learns, through the lead character's narration, that David is going to die at the end of the season. The show follows David through the process of making a show and surviving a fantastical, almost satirical Hollywood. Break a Leg takes place in San Francisco with some scenes in Los Angeles. Hollywood itself is portrayed as a kind of macabre world where unions engage in actual wars and child actors live in the sewers.

== Characters ==
- David Penn (Yuri Baranovsky)
- Chase Cougar (Justin Morrison)
- Claudio Ciccone (Daniel George)
- Humphrey Archibald (Daniel George)
- Francesca Scala (Daniela DiIorio)
- Amber Turnipseed (Alexis Boozer)
- Jimmy Scotch (Drew Lanning)
- Jennifer John Bradley (Chad Yarish)
- Sebastian Windlethorpe (Skip Emerson)
- Larry Gibbons (Flynn Kelleher)
- Andy Corvell (Erik Bergmann)
- Jezebel (Laura Secour)
- Mint (Dustin Toshiyuki)
- Stan Marley (Claudio Brescia)
- Mysterious Tech (Duane Schirmer)
- Adult-sized Gary Coleman (Patrice O'Neal)
- Anna Cinnamon (Jessica Robles)
- Tahko and Casey-dilla Sosz (Hugo Martin)

== Development ==
In March 2006, FX held a MySpace contest through their hit show, It's Always Sunny in Philadelphia, asking viewers to create their own 5-minute pilot for a TV show that had never been on air. Yuri Baranovsky was already working on a feature-length independent film titled LIFE NOIR, and he, the crew, and the actors decided to enter the competition. The Baranovskys wrote the idea in one sitting and the short "episode" was shot in one day.

The show didn't win but managed to garner a small fanbase, with some individuals contacting FX to tell them they picked the wrong show. This prompted the Break a Leg crew to create more episodes of Break a Leg under their production company name, Late Again Films.

== Episodes ==
Season one consists of 17 episodes.

- Episode 1, "The Pilot": David Penn is a Hollywood writer who has just had his sitcom Groomates picked up. Held captive in a closet, with a gun to his head, David begins to recall the events that led to his current predicament.
- Episode 2, Bad Press": The new publicist that the producers have hired to promote Groomates plans to leak embarrassing personal information about the cast, who threaten to quit in protest if David does not do something about it.
- Episode 3, "High Treason": David discovers that there's a mole within the Groomates production team funneling information about the show to a rival production.
- Episode 4, "Back to school"
- Episode 5; Detention"
- Episode 6, Sex Ed"
- Episode 7, "Courting 101"
- Episode 8, "Cutting Class"
- Episode 9, "Sex and Violence"
- Episode 10, "Road Trip
- Episode 11, "Drug Trip
- Episode 12, "My Surreality
- Episode 13, "Ghosts, Mimes and Partridges"
- Episode 14, "War Games
- Episode 15, "Old Ghosts
- Episode 16, "Hollywood Jesus
- Episode 17, "Revelations
