= Jonathan Corbett =

British TV food channel presenter and food commentator

- Born: Telford, Shropshire, England
- Occupation(s): Presenter, food commentator, buyer
- Spouse: Antonia Jones (m. 2007)

Jonathan Corbett is a British TV food channel presenter, food commentator, and buyer working for Tesco plc.

Born and raised in Telford, Shropshire. Corbett was educated at the Charlton School, before training as a Chef at Radbrook Catering College, Shrewsbury. His then lecturer was the wife of former British Prime Minister, John Major, Norma.

After graduating, Corbett went on to work at the Duke of Westminster's, The Chester Grosvenor Hotel, before taking up a position with Marco Pierre White at the 3 Michelin Star ‘The Restaurant’ in London's Hyde Park Hotel. After working as a Chef, Corbett was given the opportunity to work in food development and buying at the Sultan of Brunei's Dorchester Hotel in London – from there Corbett worked for Robert De Niro's Nobu restaurant, and London's Met Bar at the Metropolitan Hotel in similar positions.

Corbett joined Tesco in February 2007 – and is working on the key development of Ethnic and Exotic food into the retailer's stores worldwide.

In January 2010 Corbett formed The Little Big Voice, a Marketing and Innovation company based in London.

Corbett married Antonia Jones from American Express in July 2007, in the bride's hometown of Leyland, Lancashire, UK.
