= Broke Leg Creek =

Broke Leg Creek (better known as Broke Leg Falls) is a stream and waterfall in Morgan and Menifee counties, in the U.S. state of Kentucky.

Originally established as a State Park in the early 1960s, the 14-acre land was abandoned by the state due to the decrease in visitors and traffic flow. Private owners bought the land in the 80s, but did not perform the maintenance and upkeep required. Eventually, 2002 the Menifee County government bought the land back and restored the area to its former glory. To help with these restorations, a regional tourism-promotion organization, called TOUR Southern and Eastern Kentucky, collaborated with the local chamber of commerce to give grant money and assistance. The grant money assisted with the addition of a new gazebo, campsite, grills, and new picnic tables.

Tragically, in March 2012 an EF-3 tornado ripped through Broke Leg Falls and the surrounding areas of Morgan or Menifee, just a year after the restorations had ended. Prior to the tornado, the creek and falls were not visible by road. People had to climb down several rock stairways to take a glimpse. However, once the tornado ripped all the trees away, the falls were clear enough to be seen from the roadway. Due to the extensive damage and location of the falls, not much could be done to rebuild the area for quite some time. As much trees and debris were cleared, but the best course of action was to let nature take its course. After several years, the bridge and stairs were repaired, which totaled well over $38,000 in costs. Since so much work had gone into the previous restoration and reopening of the park, it was especially devastating to the local communities that it was obliterated in a matter of minutes.

== See also ==
- List of rivers of Kentucky
