= Colin Quinn =

American comedian and actor (born 1959)

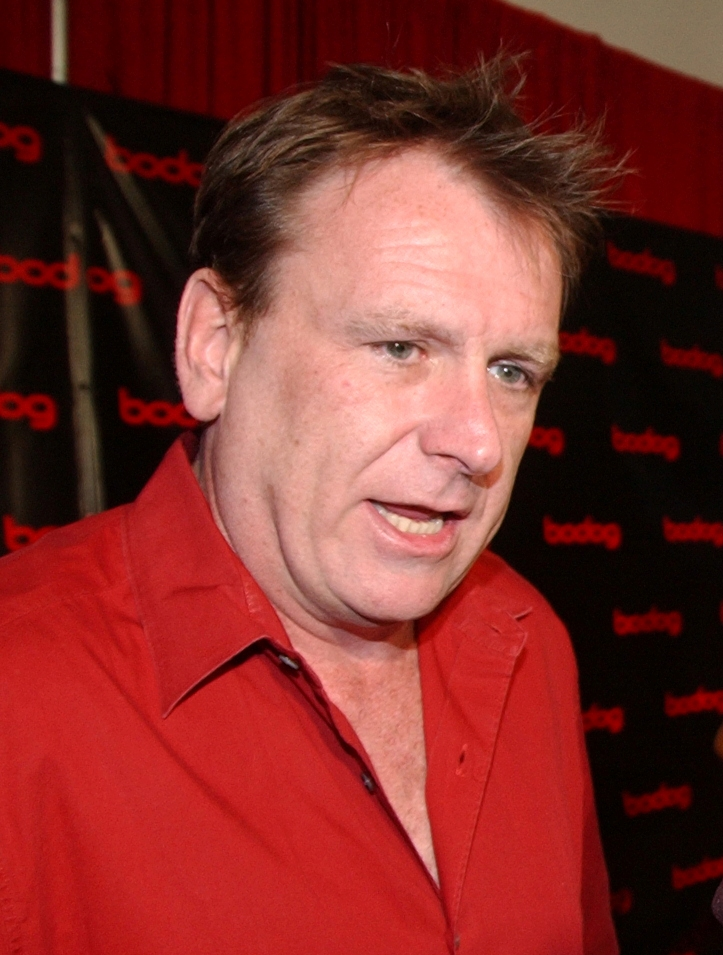
- Quinn in 2005
- Born: Colin Edward Quinn; June 6, 1959 (age 67); New York City, U.S.
- Notable work: Co-host of Remote Control; Weekend Update anchor on Saturday Night Live; Host of Tough Crowd with Colin Quinn
- Spouse: Jen Sochko (m. 2019)

Comedy career
- Years active: 1980–present
- Medium: Stand-up; television; film; radio; literature; one man show
- Genres: Observational comedy; black comedy; sketch comedy; satire; political satire; news satire
- Subjects: American politics; American culture; current events; race relations; world history; drinking culture
- Website: www.colinquinn.com

Colin Edward Quinn (born June 6, 1959) is an American stand-up comedian, actor, and writer. He first gained widespread attention for his work as a cast member and writer on Saturday Night Live from 1995 to 2000, and he became known for anchoring Weekend Update, the show's news parody segment. Prior to SNL, he was best known as the announcer/sidekick/co-host on MTV's 1980s game show Remote Control. Following his departure from SNL, Quinn went on to host Comedy Central's late-night panel show Tough Crowd with Colin Quinn, where he and a panel of New York's big names in stand-up comedy discussed and debated news stories of the day. Notable film work includes his role as Dooey in A Night at the Roxbury, Dickey Bailey in the Grown Ups films, and playing Amy Schumer's father in the film Trainwreck. Comedians such as Jerry Seinfeld, Tina Fey, Chris Rock, and Dave Attell have cited Quinn as the quintessential "comic's comic" and New York comedian.

Quinn has also become known for his comedic one-man shows that feature his takes on history and growing up in New York City. As of 2020, he has written and starred in seven stage shows: Irish Wake, My Two Cents, Long Story Short, Unconstitutional, The New York Story, Red State Blue State, and The Wrong Side of History, two of which he collaborated on with Seinfeld as director. Long Story Short was filmed as an HBO special that aired on April 9, 2011, and Unconstitutional, The New York Story, and Red State Blue State were released as Netflix specials.

== Early life and education ==
Quinn was born on June 6, 1959, in the Park Slope neighborhood of Brooklyn, New York City, where he was raised, the son of teachers. He is of Irish descent. Quinn's paternal grandparents arrived from Belfast around 1920.

He attended Stony Brook University, in Stony Brook, Long Island, but did not graduate.

== Career ==
=== Early career ===
Quinn began performing stand-up comedy in 1984. He first achieved fame in 1987 as the sidekick announcer of the MTV game show Remote Control, which lasted five seasons. Quinn also hosted the final episodes of the series in 1990 due to regular host Ken Ober's commitment to the series Parenthood. In 1989, he hosted the A&E stand-up showcase Caroline's Comedy Hour, and wrote and acted in the comedic short/music video "Going Back to Brooklyn" (a parody of LL Cool J's "Going Back to Cali") with Ben Stiller. He wrote for In Living Color, and co-wrote and produced the movie Celtic Pride, which starred Damon Wayans and Dan Aykroyd.

=== Saturday Night Live ===
Quinn was hired as a writer and featured player on Saturday Night Live (SNL) in 1995 and became a full cast member during the 1997–1998 season. He established himself on the show with recurring characters and segments such as "Lenny the Lion", "Joe Blow", "Colin Quinn Explains The New York Times", and "Weekend Update".

Quinn began hosting "Weekend Update" in January 1998 after Norm Macdonald was fired, and anchored the segment until his departure from SNL in 2000. He commented on a number of highly publicized media circuses, including the Clinton–Lewinsky scandal and the Microsoft anti-trust trial.

During his tenure on SNL, Quinn turned down an offer for the role of Scott Evil in fellow cast member Mike Myers's film Austin Powers: International Man of Mystery. Quinn has called the role, which was ultimately played by Seth Green, the only project he has regretted turning down.

=== Television and film work and stand-up ===
After leaving SNL, Quinn hosted the short-lived The Colin Quinn Show on NBC in the spring of 2002. The show combined sketch comedy and stand-up in a live-to-tape format. Despite mostly positive reviews from critics, it was cancelled after three episodes.

Quinn had greater success with his subsequent show, Tough Crowd with Colin Quinn, which ran on weekdays on Comedy Central from 2002 to 2004. The show featured a panel of four comedians, with Quinn as host, discussing the social and political issues of the day. The show ran for over 200 episodes.

His stand-up was also used in the animated series Shorties Watchin' Shorties.

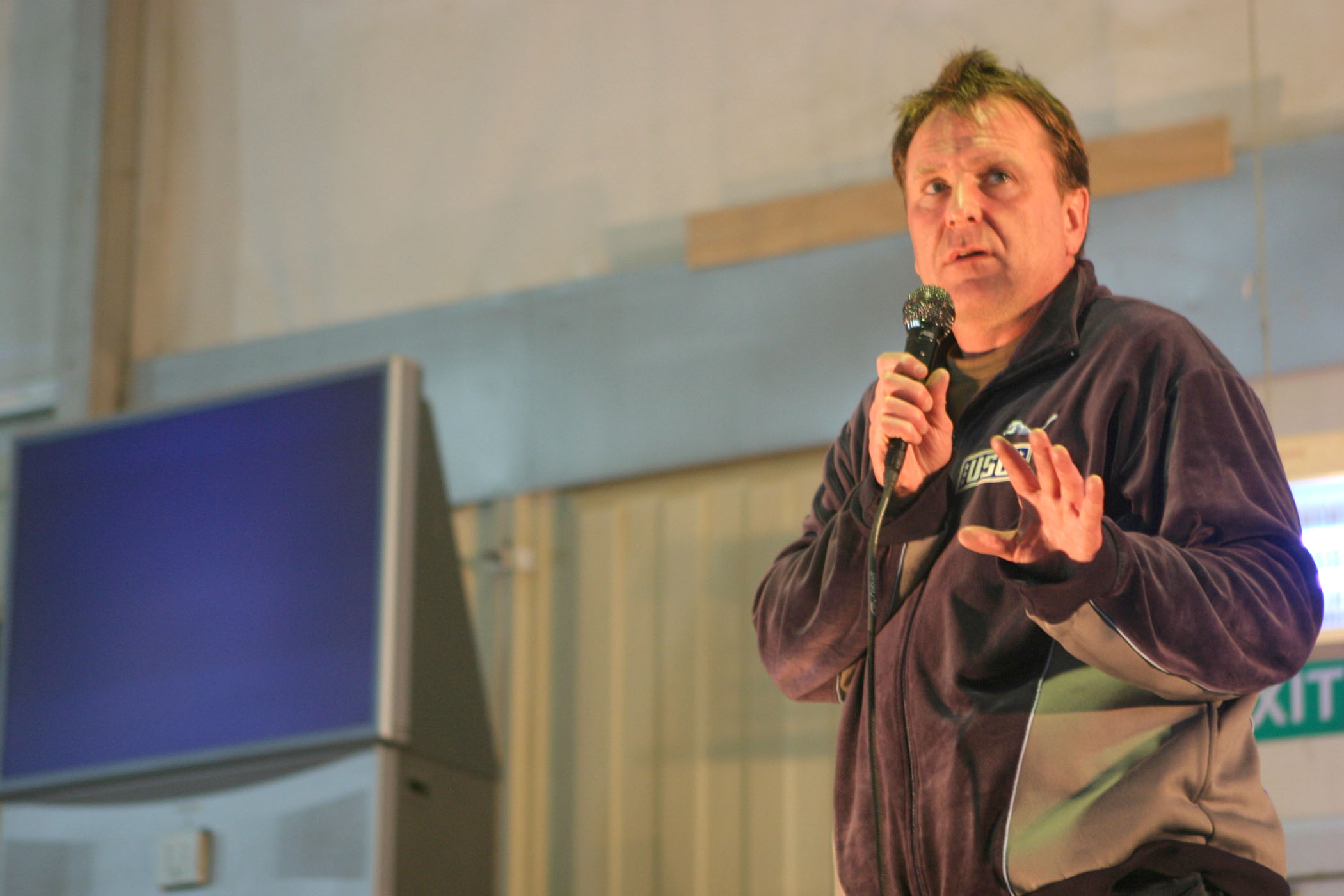
Quinn performing during a USO tour in 2005

In 2005, Quinn participated in a USO tour of American military bases around the world, performing stand-up to entertain the troops.

He was the "unofficial co-host" on the Nick DiPaolo show on the now-defunct 92.3 Free FM in New York City, airing Monday–Friday from noon to three. Quinn and DiPaolo were originally slated to host the show together on WJFK-FM, but the station decided not to pick up the show. Quinn was also a regular guest on The Opie & Anthony Show until its run ended in 2014.

Quinn played Dickie Bailey, the childhood rival to Lenny Feder (Adam Sandler's character) in Grown Ups (2010) and Grown Ups 2 (2013). He also had a recurring role as Hermie on the HBO series Girls.

Quinn wrote and starred in the L/Studio web series Cop Show, which premiered in February 2015. The series stars Quinn as a satirical, pompous version of himself, starring in a New York City-based crime drama. The show's guest stars have included Jerry Seinfeld, Dave Attell, Chris Rock, Steve Buscemi, Jim Gaffigan, Michael Che, Tom Papa, Jim Norton, Pat Cooper, Irina Shayk and Amy Schumer.

Quinn had a supporting role in Amy Schumer's film debut, Trainwreck (2015), as her character's father. He was critically praised for his performance.

=== One-man shows ===
Quinn made his Broadway debut in 1998 in a one-man show, Colin Quinn: An Irish Wake, co-written with Lou DiMaggio. The show reflected Quinn's upbringing within the Irish-American community of Brooklyn; it was set at a wake in 1976, with Quinn portraying family members and acquaintances who show up for the event.

In 2009, Quinn premiered his second one-man show, My Two Cents, which covers the economic crumbling of the American empire.

In 2010, Quinn premiered his third one-man show Colin Quinn Long Story Short on Broadway, directed by Jerry Seinfeld. The show covered world history from prehistoric times to the present, offering satirical takes on the rise and fall of various world empires. Quinn recorded a special performance of the show that aired on HBO on April 9, 2011. A Brazilian version of the show featuring comedian Bruno Motta has the title 1 Milhao de Anos em 1 Hora ("1 Million Years in 1 Hour").

In 2013, Quinn premiered another one-man show on historical themes, Unconstitutional, which covers the United States Constitution, its creation, and its impact on the American psyche.

Quinn starred in his fifth one-man show, The New York Story, in July and August 2015 at the Cherry Lane Theatre. The show was based upon the experiences chronicled in his book, The Coloring Book: A Comedian Solves Race Relations in America. It delves into his growing up in the ethnically diverse Park Slope neighborhood of Brooklyn and how it has changed over the years into its current state. Seinfeld, who directed Long Story Short, returned as director.

In early 2019, Quinn premiered his sixth one-man show, Red State Blue State, at the Minetta Lane Theatre. The show explored contemporary politics in the United States on both sides of the primary political spectrum.

In 2020, Quinn released his second book, Overstated: A Coast-to-Coast Roast of the 50 States, and directed the HBO Max comedy special Colin Quinn & Friends: A Parking Lot Comedy Show.

== Personal life ==
Quinn stopped drinking in the early 1980s after several bad experiences with alcohol, including blackouts and arrests.

On February 14, 2018, he suffered a heart attack in New York. He recovered a few days later.

On June 8, 2019, Quinn married Late Night with Seth Meyers producer Jen Sochko.

== Awards and honors ==
In 2004, Quinn was named No. 56 on Comedy Central's list of the 100 greatest stand-up comedians of all time.

He was named one of the Top 100 Irish Americans of the year in 2004 and 2011 by the magazine Irish America.

== Filmography ==
=== Film ===
Year	Title	Role	Notes
1983	Rock 'n' Roll Hotel	DJ	Aired on HBO
1987	Three Men and a Baby	Gift Shop Clerk	
1988	Crocodile Dundee II	Onlooker at Mansion	
1988	Married to the Mob	Homicide Detective	
1993	Who's the Man?	Frankie Flynn	
1998	A Night at the Roxbury	Dooey	
2003	Crooked Lines	Annoying Customer	
2006	Home	Himself	Documentary film
2008	Harold	Reedy	
2009	Paper Boys	TV Voiceover	
2010	Grown Ups	Dickie Bailey	
2012	That's My Boy	Strip Club DJ	
2013	Grown Ups 2	Dickie Bailey	
2015	Trainwreck	Gordon	
2016	Booted	Debt Collector	
2017	Sandy Wexler	Kevin Connors	
2019	Drunk Parents	Ryan the Bum #2	
2020	Hubie Halloween	Janitor	

=== Television ===
Year	Title	Role	Notes
1987–1990	Remote Control	Sidekick/Announcer and writer	All episodes
1988	The Cosby Show	Davey Herbeck	1 episode
1988	2 Hip 4 TV	Co-host with Ahmet Zappa	Unknown episodes
1989	Men	Baltimore	1 episode
1989	Caroline's Comedy Hour	Host	2 episodes
1989–1990	True Blue		2 episodes
1990	Manly World		Also writer
1992	The Ben Stiller Show		1 episode
1992	Gaudy, Bawdy & Blue	Mulligan	TV movie
1995	The Larry Sanders Show	Cully	1 episode
1996–2000	Saturday Night Live	Cast Member	74 episodes
1996	The Christmas Tree	Tom	TV movie
1997	Pulp Comics: Jim Breuer	Cop	1 episode
1997	Space Ghost Coast to Coast	Himself	1 episode
2002	The Colin Quinn Show		3 episodes
2002–2004	Tough Crowd with Colin Quinn	Host and writer	200+ episodes
2003	Windy City Heat	Talk Show Guest	TV movie
2004	Ring My Bell	Game Show Guest	CW Network
2008	What About Sal?	O'Brien	TV short
2011	Cheat	Delivery Boy	TV short
2011	The Green Room with Paul Provenza	Himself	1 Episode
2013–2017	Girls	Hermie	8 episodes
2014	The Awesomes	Jeff Apelstein	7 episodes
2014–2015	Inside Amy Schumer	Judge / Elevator Passenger From Hell	2 episodes
2015	The Nightly Show with Larry Wilmore	Pinocchio	1 episode
2015–2016	The Jim Gaffigan Show	Himself	2 episodes
2019	Crashing	Himself	Episode: "The Viewing Party"

=== Writer ===
Year	Title	Notes
1993	In Living Color	TV series (8 episodes)
1995–1997	Saturday Night Live	TV series (also cast member) (40 episodes)
1996	Celtic Pride	Film written with Judd Apatow
2014–2016	Cop Show	26 episodes

=== Comedy specials ===
Year	Title	Studio	Formats
1992	One Night Stand	HBO	Broadcast/streaming
2011	Long Story Short	HBO	Broadcast/Blu-ray/DVD/download/streaming
2015	Unconstitutional	Netflix	DVD/CD/audio & video download/streaming
2016	The New York Story	Netflix	Streaming
2019	Red State Blue State	Netflix/CNN	CD/audio download/video streaming
2020	Colin Quinn & Friends: A Parking Lot Comedy Show	HBO Max	Streaming
2024	Colin Quinn: Our Time Is Up	YouTube	Streaming
2024	Stamps & Tea	YouTube	Streaming

== Bibliography ==
Year	Title	Publisher	Formats
2015	The Coloring Book: A Comedian Solves Race Relations in America	Grand Central Publishing	Print: hardcover/E-book, audiobook: CD/download/streaming
2020	Overstated: A Coast-to-Coast Roast of the 50 States	St. Martin's Press	Print: hardcover/E-book, audiobook: CD/download/streaming

Media offices
Preceded by Norm Macdonald	Weekend Update anchor 1998–2000	Succeeded by Tina Fey and Jimmy Fallon
