= Faction Talk =

- Broadcast area: United States; Canada
- Frequency: Sirius XM Radio channel 137
- Branding: xL Faction Talk

Programming
- Format: Talk radio

Ownership
- Owner: Sirius XM Holdings

History
- First air date: August 6, 2004

Technical information
- Class: Satellite radio station

Links
- Website: www.siriusxm.com/factiontalk

Faction Talk is a subscription-based channel on the satellite radio service Sirius XM Radio. The channel first aired on XM on August 6, 2004, as xL High Voltage in preparation for the launch of the American radio show Opie and Anthony several months later, and required subscribers to purchase the channel as a premium, until 2005.

In 2006, the channel was renamed xL the ViRUS and became affiliated with additional radio shows and podcasts, including Ron and Fez. The channel became The Opie and Anthony Channel in 2011, until the firing of host Anthony Cumia led to the channel being renamed SiriusXM Talk from July 2014. Three months later, it was rebranded again as xL Opie Radio and became one of XM's nine "XL" channels for frequent explicit language. In 2017, following the break up of Opie with Jim Norton, it was renamed to "xL Faction Talk".

== History ==
=== 2004–2006: High Voltage ===
Former XM 202 Logo as xL High Voltage

On August 5, 2004, radio personalities Gregg "Opie" Hughes and Anthony Cumia signed a contract to host their Opie and Anthony show on XM Satellite Radio, a subscription-based satellite radio service from October 4 of that year, from New York City. The two had been out of work since their firing in August 2002 from WNEW-FM in New York City, after station owner Infinity Broadcasting paid them to stay off the air. On the following day, a dedicated channel for the hosts was launched as High Voltage on XM channel 202, a premium channel that cost subscribers an additional $1.99 per month. The name High Voltage was decided by one of XM's lawyers without consulting either host, despite them telling Hughes and Cumia they could think of a name. From the channel's launch to the show's debut broadcast, the channel aired nothing but two 40-second announcements promoting the show's return to the air. At 12:01 a.m. EST on October 1, 2004, the loop was interrupted to air O&A: Ungagged, a program that marked the duo's first radio appearance since 2002, aired on the XM Comedy, Boneyard, and SquiZZ channels.

Opie and Anthony launched on October 4, 2004, and aired weekdays from 6:00 a.m. to around 10:00 a.m. EST, with replays broadcast throughout the day. In late December 2004 through January 3, 2005, WAQX-FM in Syracuse, New York, aired a censored version of the previous day's show, while The Howard Stern Show was on its Christmas vacation, the first time the pair was heard on terrestrial radio since their firing at WNEW. Hughes called it "a testing ground for putting us back on terrestrial radio", which would not happen again until 2006. On March 14, 2005, the show moved their start and end time back an hour, airing from 7:00 a.m. to 11:00 a.m. each weekday. On April 2, 2005, XM scrapped the additional charge its subscribers were required to pay to obtain High Voltage, and made the channel part of its standard subscription with access to its XM Radio Online service.

For nearly eleven months, Opie and Anthony was the only show on High Voltage. At the end of their live show, the replay of the show from that morning would begin immediately after. In March 2005, the show held "auditions" for other radio personalities to showcase their programs for the possible addition to the High Voltage line-up. These included The Hill-Man Morning Show from WAAF in Boston, and Loren and Wally, from WROR-FM in Boston. On August 1, 2005, XM announced the addition of personalities Ron Bennington and Fez Whatley to host their Ron and Fez show of WJFK in Washington, D.C., on the service. The pair had previously worked with Hughes and Cumia at WNEW and the four remained good friends. Ron and Fez premiered on September 12, 2005, from noon to 3:00 p.m., airing each weekday after Opie and Anthony.

Starting in November 2005, the channel had been a part of the DirecTV Total Choice Plus package on channel 879. XM had rated the channel "TV-MA-L" for DirecTV listings. However, shortly after Opie and Anthony returned to FM radio, DirecTV decided to remove the channel from their service, claiming they wanted to go "all music." Thanks to a series of listener complaints, DirecTV eventually restored High Voltage to its lineup.

In honor of Jim Norton's birthday, on July 19, 2006, the channel was renamed xL Jimmy Day, and on the new line of XM2gos that included color displays, Jim Norton's face was put on the display.

=== 2006–2011: the ViRUS ===
High Voltage was rebranded as the ViRUS on November 20, 2006, and remained on channel 202. The name is derived from the Opie and Anthony slogan 'Spread the Virus', a reference to viral marketing. The launch featured a new channel logo as well as exposure on packaging of XM Radio products. In addition, some extra spots on the weekend were dedicated to new weekly shows, such as the Razzle Dazzle Variety Hour, and the Saturday Night Virus. The latter is a weekly rotating slot featuring comedians and friends of the show. Weekend programs were not restricted to Saturday nights though, as The Cosmic Circus aired during a Ron and Fez weekend afternoon replay. Sometimes, the Saturday Night Virus includes a second show, running it to 3:00 in the morning. On October 13, 2011, it was announced that the channel was renamed "The Opie & Anthony Channel".

==== Opie and Anthony suspension ====
In May 2007, an Opie and Anthony audio byte appeared on the website Breitbart.tv, which had a clip of their show featuring a homeless man talking about how he would sexually abuse Condoleezza Rice, and the Queen of the United Kingdom. This clip soon made its way to the Drudge Report, and gained a lot of attention through news media outlets, as this was following the firings of CBS Radio peers Don Imus, and JV & Elvis. Opie and Anthony were not allowed to discuss the situation on the air, and continued their show. On May 15, 2007, Opie and Anthony were suspended for 30 days for comments made on the previous days broadcast. The show could no longer be heard on XM, but it was still heard on the terrestrial outlets. The ViRUS turned into Ron and Fez every hour, every day, and the weekend programs were also suspended. The fans of the show were angered by this decision, and were calling XM to complain or cancel their subscriptions. Weeks later, XM began hyping up Opie and Anthony's return, and even abandoned the embargo on the show to run worst-of CBS show blocks four days before the live show returned. The show returned on time as promised, on June 15, 2007.

On September 23, 2007, the ViRUS added Unmasked to the weekend lineup. The show is hosted by Ron Bennington of Ron and Fez, as he interviews a comedian in front of an audience of their fans. The show runs every other Sunday at 2 p.m. ET, which will be an encore of the show's real premiere on XM Comedy Saturdays. Following the Sirius / XM merger, the ViRUS was added to Sirius on September 30, 2008, as part of its "Best of XM" package and broadcasts on channel 206. On November 12, 2008, the ViRUS was removed from the DirecTV lineup.

=== 2011–2014: The Opie & Anthony Channel ===
On October 13, 2011, it was announced that the channel was no longer the ViRUS, and was renamed to the Opie & Anthony channel.

=== 2014: SiriusXM Talk ===
In July 2014, Cumia was fired by SiriusXM. Hughes and Norton continued to broadcast and the show relaunched as Opie with Jim Norton in July 2014, and the channel was renamed to SiriusXM Talk.

=== 2014–2017: Opie Radio ===
Former XM 103 Logo as XL Opie Radio

Opie and Norton re-signed a contract with SiriusXM on October 1, 2014. The following day, the channel name was changed from SiriusXM Talk to Opie Radio.

In October 2016, growing differences between Hughes and Norton led to Hughes hosting afternoons with The Opie Radio Show and Norton staying in mornings with former Opie and Anthony producer Sam Roberts, with Jim Norton & Sam Roberts. The latter airs from 8:00 to 11:00 a.m., with The Opie Radio Show airing from 3:00 to 6:00 p.m.

=== 2017–present: Faction Talk ===
On January 23, 2017, the channel was renamed Faction Talk. The decision was made following the addition of The Jason Ellis Show from the Faction channel to the weekday line-up from 11:00 a.m. In May 2017, the channel was no longer a premium and comedian Nick Di Paolo began his radio show from 6:00–8:00 p.m. weekdays, followed by The Covino & Rich Show live from Los Angeles until midnight. In the following month, Hughes was fired for allegedly filming an employee using the bathroom.

Following the departure of The Opie Radio Show, the channel lineup was revamped. Jim Norton & Sam Roberts remained at 8:00-11:00 am, The Covino & Rich Show moved to 11:00 am–2:00 pm, The Jason Ellis Show moved to 2:00-6:00 pm, and The Craig Ferguson Show moved to the channel from 6:00-8:00 pm, with The Nick Di Paolo Show airing from 8:00-10:00 pm.

In April 2018, Nick Di Paolo was fired from Sirius XM due to a Tweet that management deemed offensive.

The Bennington show joined the channel in July 2018, taking the 2:00-5:00 pm slot. Later in 2018, the lineup was again revamped, adding an hour to Jim Norton & Sam Roberts, airing from 7:00-11:00 am ET, The Covino & Rich Show from 11:00 am–2:00 pm, Bennington from 2:00-5:00 pm, and The Jason Ellis Show from 5:00-8:00 pm.

The Jason Ellis Show was cancelled on November 23, 2020.

In late 2020, it was announced The Bonfire with Big Jay Oakerson and Dan Soder would fill the 5:00 pm-7:00 pm time slot. Soder and Oakerson had been off the air while working on a contract to keep them at SiriusXM. They had previously been on Comedy Central Radio. Dan Soder left the show on March 1, 2023, and was replaced by Bobby Kelly.

In August 2022, former Volume hosts Eddie Trunk, Nick Carter, Lori Majewski, and Alan Light had their shows moved to different time slots and reformatted to Faction Talk. The hosts' replays will still live on Volume. Trunk Nation moved to 3:00-5:00 pm Eastern and Feedback has added Alan Light to their program and moves to 7:00-9:00 pm Eastern.

In September, 2026, Faction Talk was moved to channel 137.

== Former shows ==
- Opie and Anthony
- Ron and Fez
- Jim Norton & Sam Roberts
- Opie and Anthony Worst of The Week – A replay of parts of show from the week. Divided into two parts.
- The Davey Mac Sports Program – Hosted by former Ron and Fez show producer East Side Dave, Chris "Pepper" Stanley, and band leader Roy "Shaffer" Harter.
- Opie with Jim Norton
- The Ron and Fez Flashback Show – A replay of parts of shows from the week. This is hosted by Fez Whatley.
- Ron Bennington Interviews – A weekend show which re-airs interviews of guests on the Ron & Fez show.
- Unmasked – A weekly show hosted by Ron Bennington (and once by Sonny Fox) on Raw Dog Comedy that features in-depth interviews with comedians in front of an audience of fans. The show is similar in spirit to XM's music series, Artist Confidential.
- My Wife Hates Me – A podcast hosted by married comedians Rich Vos and Bonnie McFarlane, combining the bickering of a husband and wife relationship with wit. Both painfully honest and brutally funny, Vos and Bonnie give you a glimpse into their lives every week as they vent about the industry, everyday life and each other. Airs on multiple times weekly and on the weekends.
- SModcast – Syndication of director Kevin Smith's podcast began in September 2010. In addition to replaying the Internet podcast, there are monthly SModcasts which are exclusive to the satellite radio channel.
- The Joe Rogan Experience – Syndication of comedian and UFC color commentator Joe Rogan's podcast, with co-host Brian Redban, began in May 2011.
- Razzle Dazzle Variety Hour – Programming included "The Opie and Anthony Staff Musical Adventure Hour", "Worst of the Walks," and "When the Mics Are Off".
- The Big City – A weekly hour long show hosted by Ron & Fez discussing the news and commentary of New York City during the past week.
- CT and Jivin – Hosted by Corey Thompson and dump guy for O&A's K-Rock show Matt Jivin
- The Than and Sam Show – Hosted by Opie and Anthony show producer Sam Roberts and former producer Than.
- Dee Dee's Basement – Hosted by former XM Kids personality Dee Dee Grucelski.
- Storytime with Francine – Hosted by former Opie and Anthony intern Francine.
- Bob Kelly and Sometimes Colin Quinn – Hosted by comedian Robert Kelly, and rarely Colin Quinn co-hosts with him.
- Bad News – Hosted by O&A regular Robert Kelly and comedian Russ Meneve.
- Black Phillip – aka Bitch Management, hosted by Patrice O'Neal and a few friends.
- Uninformed – Hosted by comedians Bill Burr and Joe DeRosa.
- Louis CK – Hosted by comedian Louis CK.
- The Secret Show – Hosted by Danny Ross and Anthony Cumia while both drunk.
- The Lazlow Show – Hosted by former Technofile host and Grand Theft Auto producer Lazlow.
- The Back to the Future Secret Show – broadcast on July 27, 2008, the Opie and Anthony crew watch Back to the Future and comment. Compared to Mystery Science Theater 3000 but with adult language.
- Sam & Dave: The Lost Tapes – Hosted by O&A show producer Sam Roberts and Ron and Fez producer East Side Dave.
- Brother Wease – Hosted by WCMF personality Brother Wease, and other personalities from his morning show in Rochester.
- The Hideout – Hosted by El Jefe and J-Dubs, a show broadcast previously on WXXM in Lansing, Michigan, WJFK-FM in Washington, D.C., and WTKS-FM in Orlando, Florida
- Vos & Bonnie – Hosted by Rich Vos and Bonnie McFarlane.
- Black Rock Coalition – Hosted by Ron and Fez producer Earl Douglas.
- High Society Radio – Hosted by Pepper Hicks, Bronx Johnny, and Chris from Brooklyn
- CineMassacre Radio – Hosted by O&A show producer Danny Ross, Co-hosted by The Angry Video Game Nerd, James Rolfe.
- Special Delivery Starring Sam and Dave – Hosted by O&A show producer Sam Roberts and former Ron and Fez show producer East Side Dave
- The Opie Radio Show
- The Nick Di Paolo Show
- The Jason Ellis Show
- Covino and Rich
- The Craig Ferguson Show
