= 1997 in radio =

The year 1997 saw a number of significant events in radio broadcasting history.

== Events ==
- January – Capstar buys Baltimore-based Benchmark Communications for $173 million.
- 7 January – Rádio Regina, a new regional station of Slovenský rozhlas (Slovak Radio) in Bratislava, starts broadcasting on 792 kHz.
- 24 January – Long-time St. Louis Top 40 WKBQ flips to Modern AC as "Alice 104.1."
- 15 February – After five years of Alternative Rock, WDRE flips to Urban as Philly 103.9
- 18 February – Evergreen Media announce they will merge with Chancellor Broadcasting as part of a US$1.075 billion deal. At the same time, the combined company announces they will acquire Viacom's 10 station group.
- 24 February – 98.5 Kiss (Kiss Again 103.3)/Houston debuts after stunting with a loop of "Kiss" by Prince.
- 23 May – KBKS/Seattle flips from gold-based Rhythmic AC to Modern AC-leaning Top 40, rebranding as "Kiss 106.1."
- June – Florida-based Paxson Communications sells its entire 169 station group to Clear Channel Communications for $693 million. The deal closes in December.
- 22 June – V-103/Baltimore flips from its long-time urban contemporary format to Top 40, branded as "102.7 XYV."
- 11 July – KZQZ/San Francisco debuts its Top 40 format, branded as "Z95.7."
- 1 August – WDBZ/New York changes call letters to WNSR with plans to flip back to a Gold-based AC on 18 August. However, Chancellor Media begins an LMA with 105.1 three days prior and the format flip is called off. The station still quietly evolves to more of a Hot AC format by October, calling themselves "FM 105.1", with plans for a new format of some sort to come in 1998.
- 4 August – Hot AC-formatted WMTX/Tampa flips to Modern AC as "Star 95.7" WSSR.
- 2 September – KOAZ/Phoenix flips from smooth jazz to country as "Wild Country 103.5."
- 5 September – WFLN/Philadelphia ends 40 years of Classical music. At 6 PM this day, the station flips to Modern AC as "Max 95.7"
- 18 September – Kansas City's heritage rock station KYYS "KY 102" drops its 23-year-old AOR format to become modern AC "102.1 The Zone." The staff, several of whom have been with the station its entire run, is informed of the decision to change its format and their termination just 90 minutes in advance. The venerable KYYS call letters would be replaced by "KOZN" about a month later.
- 19 September – American Radio Systems announces they will merge with Westinghouse Broadcasting (which would be renamed CBS, Inc.), getting 98 stations and $2.6 billion as part of the deal.
- October – Kansas City's WHB 710 and KCMO 810 swap frequencies.
- 1 October – Windy 100 (WPNT-FM, now WSHE-FM)/Chicago debuts with an adult contemporary format
- 20 October – KMJM-FM/St. Louis moves from 107.7 to 104.9 at midnight. After 12 hours of stunting, 107.7 relaunches as KSLZ "Z107.7." Also on this day, longtime easy listening station KLTH/Kansas City picks up the discarded AOR format of KYYS and much of the ex-KY 102 staff and becomes "99.7 KY."
- 19 November – KIBB in Los Angeles flips from Rhythmic AC to Urban Oldies, branded as "Mega 100". The station is a pioneer, becoming one of the first stations to adopt the format, and resulting in the launches of similar stations around the country over the next 3 years.
- 21 November – After 37 years of classical music, WQRS/Detroit flips to Modern Rock, branded as "105.1 The Edge."
- 26 November – WVTY/Pittsburgh shifts from adult top 40 to Modern AC as "96.1 The River." The move comes due to a sale from Hearst to SFX Broadcasting, which brings about a major restructuring move at both WVTY (who would later change call letters to WDRV) and sister WTAE (AM), resulting in a mass amount of layoffs, as well as a format change on WTAE from news/talk to sports.

== Debuts ==
- Ron and Ron Show disbands, and Ron Bennington teams up with Fez Whatley to create The Ron and Fez Show.
- Dennis and Callahan debuts on WEEI in Boston

== Deaths ==
- 8 January – Harman Grisewood, 90, English radio actor and administrator.
- 20 January – Dennis Main Wilson, 72, English broadcast comedy producer.
- 7 July – Jerry Doggett, 80, American sportscaster, play-by-play for Brooklyn and Los Angeles Dodgers baseball games from 1956 in radio to 1987.
- 30 September – Al "Jazzbo" Collins, 78, American disc jockey, radio personality and recording artist, briefly host of NBC television's Tonight show in 1957.
- 18 October – Nancy Dickerson, 60, pioneering American radio and television newswoman.
- 21 December – Roger Barkley, 60, Los Angeles radio personality, teamed with Al Lohman as part of The Lohman and Barkley Show on KFI.

== See also ==
- Radio broadcasting
- List of AM Expanded Band station assignments issued by the Federal Communications Commission on March 17, 1997
