= Ron and Fez =

The Ron and Fez Show
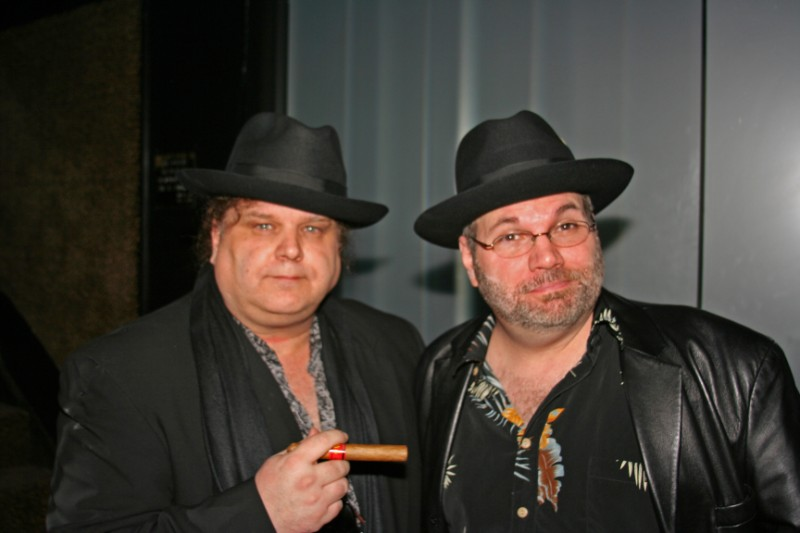
- Ron Bennington and Fez Whatley
- Genre: Talk show
- Running time: 3 hours
- Country of origin: United States
- Language: English
- Starring: Ron Bennington; Fez Whatley
- Executive producer: Chris "Pepper" Stanley
- Recording studio: New York City
- Original release: August 24, 1998 – April 3, 2015
- Audio format: Stereophonic sound
- Opening theme: "North American Scum" by LCD Soundsystem
- Ending theme: "Satellite of Love" by Lou Reed
- Website: Ron and Fez Official Site

The Ron and Fez Show was an American talk radio show hosted by Ron Bennington and Fez Whatley, which aired from August 1998 to April 2015.

After a run in Tampa, Florida as part of The Ron and Ron Show, they had stints in Daytona Beach, Florida, New York City, Washington, D.C., and on Sirius XM Radio.

== History ==
=== Formation ===
In 1987, stand-up comedian Ron Bennington joined Ron Diaz to create a wildly popular and raunchy morning radio program, The Ron and Ron Show at Tampa Bay's WYNF-FM, 95ynf (now WWRM). On December 21, 1994, Ron Diaz announced that his wife Debbie was diagnosed with AIDS, and Diaz began periodically missing broadcasts to care for her. Debbie died on November 13, 1995. Diaz announced his departure on-air from The Ron & Ron Show in early 1997, and on September 29, 1997, after a successful 11-year run, the show ended. Fez Whatley, a producer at the time, became Bennington's new co-host.

=== 1998–2000: WKRO Daytona Beach ===
On August 24, 1998, The Ron and Fez Show debuted on WKRO-FM in Daytona Beach in the morning drive-time slot. Just a few months earlier, on May 22, 1998, The Monsters in the Morning (then known as The Monsters of the Midday), briefly reunited several regulars from the cancelled Ron and Ron Show, including Bennington, Whatley, Billy "The Phone Freak," and Paul O, where on-air Ron and Fez announced their return to radio. Using the formula they helped develop in Tampa, Ron and Fez recruited new employees, interns and characters for the new show. They were on WKRO until January 2000, when they left for New York.

=== 2000–2003: WNEW-FM New York ===
The Ron and Fez show debuted on WNEW in New York City on February 21, 2000, and within one month their program was syndicated to Washington, D.C.'s WJFK.

New York's WNEW-FM was converted from a long-respected rock station to all-talk in 1999, with afternoon drive show Opie and Anthony as the focal point. Ron and Fez signed on to host an overnight talk show named Ron and Fez Dot Com, beginning February 21, 2000 and broadcast from 11pm–3am. Ron and Fez eventually moved to evenings (7:00–11:00 pm), then to early afternoon (12:00–3:00pm) and later back to the evening timeslot. Buoyed by Opie and Anthony's lead-in ratings, the duo began to enjoy success.

During this period, several memorable characters joined their on-air team, including taciturn producer Hawk; Dumpy, Tasteless Ginny; and the call-in prankster Joe Poo. The show's web-based premise inspired the founding of several websites devoted to the show, including RFBabies.com (once a haven for the show's cadre of young female fans), and the unofficial site for the show. Though "Dot Com" was soon dropped from the show's title, Ron and Fez have garnered an admirable online following due to RonFez.net.

==== Big ASS Cards ====
Ron and Fez developed the "Big ASS Card" for those wanting to join their "All Secret Society." Aside from providing discounts at sponsors' establishments, the "Big ASS Card" identified cardholders with the show. Whenever "Big ASS Card" holders gave their card number at the beginning of the call, a sound clip was played of Al Pacino yelling "HOO-AH!". Though the promotion was discontinued, some callers still announce their "BAC" numbers, and the clip is usually played when producers are paying attention.

==== September 11th, 2001 terrorist attacks ====
On the evening of September 11, the team stayed on the air taking calls from distressed listeners, some of whom were unsure if loved ones were still alive inside the Twin Towers. It is said that Hawk walked across the Queensboro Bridge against outpouring hordes of people to get to his job; Billy Staples hid in a Long Island Rail Road bathroom so he could return to work because only medical and rescue personnel were allowed into the city. Ron and Fez expressed heartfelt sympathy and related the feelings of many New Yorkers, and staged several "bar crawls" and other events under the motto "New York Forever," designed to encourage listeners to patronize businesses in lower Manhattan. "The 2001 Halloween Bar Crawl" was particularly memorable thanks to the heavy turnout and shenanigans that ensued. The bars most publicized included The Slaughtered Lamb and Karavas' Place.

==== AFRO Shows ====
Ron and Fez enjoyed amicable relationships with WNEW's other personalities, particularly Opie and Anthony (O&A), who would sometimes sit in with the Ron and Fez show. These shows were known as "AFRO Shows" (AFRO being an acronym for Anthony, Fez, Ron, Opie).

=== 2002–2005: WJFK-FM Washington, D.C. ===
Jeremy Coleman (PD of New York's WNEW in 2000) became aware of Ron and Fez when he was a program director for WJFK-FM, the sister station he nurtured. He originally intended to bring the show to DC, but instead became WNEW's program director. One month later, on March 27, 2000, Ron and Fez began tape delay syndication in DC where they found a small but loyal fan base in a late night timeslot. In November 2002, WJFK's evening radio show The Sports Junkies relocated to WHFS, opening a timeslot for Ron and Fez to syndicate their show live in Washington DC (7p.m.–11 p.m.), following The Don and Mike Show.

==== Relocation to Washington, D.C. ====
After WNEW changed formats in early 2003, Ron and Fez began broadcasting the show on WJFK. Although heard only in Washington DC, Ron and Fez chose to remain in New York until June 2003, when they finally relocated to the WJFK studios in Fairfax, Virginia. During the following year, several memorable characters, listeners and staff gave the show a fresh identity. While the WNEW show had been heavily influenced by a dedicated and funny core group of callers, WJFK proved to be fertile ground for eccentric visitors who each brought their own unique humor to the show. Perrynoid, Cherrynoid, Mikeyboy, David Lee Kinison (aka Elfish), Cigar Sid (aka Sidcada) Crazy Jen and Don the Hypnotist became call-in and studio regulars. During the late summer of 2003, Ron and Fez took calls for 2 extra hours on the evening of Hurricane Isabel. All of the DC, Northern Va and Maryland areas were without power or under water.

Known for being team players, Ron and Fez worked on split shifts, did drop-ins for WJFK's Redskins broadcasts, did live commercials and appearances, and helped mentor the hosts of a weekend show (later to become weeknight show), The Hideout. A good relationship with lead-in show Don and Mike, along with improved call-ins, freshly funny bits, and a community needing a good laugh during the 2004 presidential election propelled Ron and Fez to stellar ratings in January 2005.

==== The Fastest Hour in Radio ====
In mid-2003, after being on WJFK exclusively for a mere few months, Ron and Fez agreed to host a one-hour midday show entitled The Fastest Hour in Radio, scheduled between Howard Stern and commentator Bill O'Reilly. This timeslot would supplement their evening duties, and would not be caller-driven. Instead, Ron and Fez emphasized their own witty social commentary. When the nighttime show was syndicated in Baltimore, Maryland and Tampa, Florida in the summer of 2004, Ron and Fez focused on their evening show, with the Fastest Hour in Radio scheduled 7:00–8:00 pm.

==== Politics ====
Until 2003, Ron and Fez were not known for political commentary. But their move to the nation's capital, their experience on The Fastest Hour of Radio, and the 2004 presidential election seemed to make their discussions more political in nature.

In 2003, before becoming the cornerstone for Air America Radio, Al Franken did an interview. Shortly after the 2004 election, Tom Shales from the Washington Post called in to discuss the political ramifications of the Federal Communications Commission (FCC) crackdown on terrestrial radio. To their credit, Ron and Fez managed simulcasts of the 2004 presidential debates and election returns.

==== DC area appearances ====
Ron and Fez continued to reach out to listeners with several local appearances during their time in DC. These included:

- Ron and Fez Pool Tournament at (2003) – Included a billiards tournament, Fez performing a karaoke version of "Harper Valley PTA", Cigar Sid performing "Sugar Sugar", J Dubs' "Hot Pepper Challenge" and "Fairyoke" (listeners performing karaoke versions of effeminate songs).
- Caddyshack Movie Night (2003) – Included a screening of "Caddyshack" (Paul O. was featured as a waiter), "Nut Putt" (where listeners tried to putt golf balls at J Dubs' genitals), "Bobbing for Baby Ruths" (where listeners bobbed for fecal looking candy bars in a kiddie pool), "Gopher Hunt" (where listeners fired paintballs at Paul O), and a new "I Blow" tattoo for Paul O.
- Ron and Fez Poker Tournament (2003) – Included a poker tournament, the "Honeymooner Game", the "Gong Show", the "Mating Game", J Dubs' and Crazy Jen's Fire and Ice Challenge", performances by Monty Love, and a very drunk Silera.
- Hard Rock Cafe – New York Reunion (2003) – Ron and Fez returned to New York for a Crankcase gig at the Hard Rock Cafe and played to a packed upstairs room. Many of the show's alumni like Hawk, Tasteless Ginny, MikeyD, Tenacious C and Billy Staples dropped in along with many NY friends of the show. Anthony Cumia made a surprise appearance and a huge O&A chant erupted, causing WJFK to pull the plug on the show for over an hour, playing a "Best-Of Show" due to "technical difficulties".
- The St. Pat's Spat (2004) – included the following boxing matches: Spoon vs Tommy Bateman, El Jefe vs J Dubs, and Mikey D vs Wonderboy (during Mikey D quit in the ring). Also featured were the "Monster Toss" (a competition to see who could throw intern Monster the furthest) and Crazy Jen's failed attempt to eat 50 hard boiled eggs.
- 2nd Annual Ron and Fez Pool Tournament (2004) – included billiards tournament, hypnotism of Fez, Crazy Jen and listeners by "Don The Hypnotist", football trivia, and a listener jingle contest.
- Battle of the Local, Unsigned Bands (2004) – Ron and Fez hosted a showcase of unsigned area bands.

In addition, Fez raced in 2004 and 2005 in an annual charity 5K with fans of the show. In 2005, Fez would meet fans and friends every Friday night to party at a Fairfax, VA bar called "Thursdays", in a tradition that became known as "Friday Night Lights". Ron made his only appearance at the final "Friday Night Lights" on July 29, 2005.

==== "The Worst Kept Secret in Radio" ====
The future looked bleak for Ron and Fez at 106.7 in January 2005 when (after their best ratings to date at WJFK) the station was forced to absorb staff from WHFS—a "sister station" that switched formats from modern rock to Spanish dance. Ironically, the new staff included The Sports Junkies, who were given the midday spot many had hoped would go to Ron and Fez. The first station casualty, however, was The Hideout, which lost the late night shift and eventually relocated to WTKS 104.1 from Orlando, Florida and were subsequently canned. With nowhere to advance in the station lineup—and with little apparent respect for the show evidenced by frequent preemptions for infomercials on University of Maryland Terrapins basketball (Man on Man) and Redskins Radio Monday nights—Ron and Fez began to entertain internet rumors that they would leave terrestrial radio to join old WNEW-FM friends Opie and Anthony on XM satellite radio. 2005 was a year of hints and speculation, but nothing was confirmed until the very last segment, on their last airing in Washington, D.C.: Friday, July 29, 2005.

=== 2006–2007: WFNY-FM syndication ===
On December 20, 2006, The Ron and Fez Show debuted on WFNY-FM in the 6-9PM time slot. The Free-FM show was different from the XM show in that it is aired later in the day, and was a completely independent "evening edition" of the show. Besides the obvious FCC-compliant content of the Free-FM show, the focus was different in that it tended to focus on events local to the New York City area, in contrast to the national focus of the XM show.

The Ron and Fez Show was discontinued when WFNY reverted to a rock format as WXRK on May 24, 2007.

=== 2005–2015: Satellite radio and final years ===
On August 2, 2005, three days after Ron and Fez signed off from WJFK-FM, the official announcement was made that they would go to XM Satellite Radio beginning September 12. On August 9, and then again one month later on September 8 and 9, Ron and Fez went on The Opie and Anthony Show to provide behind-the-scenes stories about their time at WNEW-FM and the years since they last worked together. On September 9, the four hosts of both shows (as well as O&A co-host Jim Norton) met hundreds of fans at a preshow kickoff party at B.B. King's Blues Cafe in Times Square which doubled as a welcome back party to New York City for Ron and Fez.

On November 9, 2005, May 9, 2007, and September 24, 2010, Fez suffered heart attacks.

On January 16, 2009, Executive Producer Earl Douglas announced his resignation live on the air, which was not immediately believed due to his pathological lying. On May 18, 2009, the show format was extended from three hours (Noon–3pm EST) to four hours (11am–3pm EST).

In June 2010, East Side Dave McDonald departed from the show. He was one of the show's longest running producers. East Side was replaced by Chris Stanley who was promoted to Executive Producer. Chris Stanley has the longest tenure of any producer for the Ron and Fez show.

On February 24, 2012, Fez came out as gay.

On December 6, 2013, it was announced that Ron and Fez would be leaving The Opie & Anthony Channel, moving to Raw Dog Comedy Sirius XM Channel 99 effective January 6, 2014. They continue to have replays on Opie Radio at midnight and Sirius XM Indie at 6am.

On April 1, 2015, Fez announced his retirement, with their final show being April 3. The show was replaced with Bennington beginning April 20, 2015.

Fez Whatley died of heart failure at age 57 on August 14, 2021

== Characters/impersonations ==
Throughout their time on WNEW and WJFK, the show featured multiple recurring characters and impersonations, often voiced by Ron and Fez themselves or the shows' staff. They typically would "call" the show when a particularly boring guest appeared on the phone, although they would also call during the show in order to annoy Ron and Fez.

- Iris (voiced by Ron) was an elderly Jewish woman who lived in Brooklyn, and was the most frequent character on the show. She spoke with a hoarse voice and often reported "News for the Jews that You Can Use." Her husband was in a coma, and she frequently worried about the constant change in ethnic groups in her neighborhood.
- André the Giant (voiced by Fez) was an impersonation of the wrestler of the same name. Andre always introduced himself as being 7 foot 4, 560 pounds and hailing from Grenoble, France, similar stats of his real-life counterpart. Andre would mention his crippling fear of snakes at least once during every call in reference to the real Andre's legendary fight against Jake the Snake. Ron sometimes would taunt Andre about his by replacing words or parts of words with "snakes" while addressing him. (i.e. "We'll snake you later Andre.")
- Kenny Allen (voiced by Miles Bennington, Ron's son) was an eleven-year-old boy. He frequently called the show to engage in fantasies either with Ron and Fez or their guest, but would often change the rules of the fantasy or game to his advantage. He lived in the same neighborhood as Iris.
- Jan Brady (voiced by Fez) was an impersonation of the character from the Brady Bunch. She often referenced plots of the Brady Bunch sitcoms (both famous and obscure), and complained about attention paid to her sister Marcia during her calls.
- Fred Rogers (voiced by "Giant" Brian Carothers) was an impersonation of the children's show host. Like the real Mr. Rogers, Fred spoke in a quiet monotone voice and would talk about his neighbors and puppet shows. If a guest said a very obscure or difficult word, Fred would ask them to repeat it again and then tell them "I knew that you could."

== Music ==
Ron and Fez have long used eclectic music during their show's opening, closing and rejoiners from commercial breaks. For many years their closing song was "Vertigogo" by Combustible Edison featured in the movie Four Rooms, which was changed to "Satellite of Love" by Lou Reed. During their WNEW days, the opening music bed was "Oddities" by Insane Clown Posse, and also "Fired" by Ben Folds. When the show was on terrestrial WFNY in 2007, "Oddities" made a comeback, as well as other recognizable music beds from the WNEW era. The closing music of their FM show was the "Theme from the Last Waltz" by The Band.

The theme music in 2005 received a lot of attention from listeners who believed that Ron and Fez might leave WJFK for satellite radio. Some songs, like the January 2005 opening with the J Geils Band Crusin For A Love (with its lyric "I'm back on Broadway") turned out to be prophetic. Using various versions of I Shall Be Released in early summer 2005 was a clear sign that they wanted out of their contract. On that final DC broadcast, they also played We Want The Airwaves, Please Don't Talk About Me When I'm Gone, Radio, Radio, So Long Baby Goodbye, and Satellite of Love—their last song played on WJFK.

Until early 2010, the show openers were created by Mooch Cassidy & Chris Stanley. The openings mixed drop-ins from movies and pop culture into a song followed by "North American Scum" by LCD Soundsystem. For a brief period in early 2010, the show opened with a brief introduction that cuts to Ron in the studio speaking in medias res. By the mid-summer of 2010, the LCD Soundsystem intro to the program returned with the Cassidy/Hicks-style intros used from time to time.

== See also ==
- Unmasked
