= Bennington (radio show) =

American talk radio show

- Genre: Talk, Comedy
- Running time: Monday–Friday (ET) (12:00 pm – 3:00 pm)
- Country of origin: United States
- Home station: SiriusXM Faction Talk 103
- Starring: Ron Bennington; Gail Bennington
- Executive producer: Chris "Pepper Hicks" Stanley
- Original release: October 17, 2014
- Website: benningtonshow.com

Bennington is an American talk radio show hosted by Ron Bennington and his daughter Gail Bennington on SiriusXM Faction Talk.

== History ==
On October 1, 2014, it was announced that Ron would be doing a new show on Fridays. Beginning October 17, Bennington would air in the Friday 7-10AM time slot on Opie Radio, when Opie and Norton were off. The show's hashtag #Bennington trended at #2 throughout the entire initial broadcast.

== Full time expansion ==
On April 1, 2015, Fez Whatley of the Ron and Fez show announced his retirement. Their final show aired on April 3, and the following week, Ron and Fez played material highlighting their career with new material in between. At the end of the show on Friday, April 10, Ron announced that their time slot would be replaced with Bennington.

On April 20, 2015, Bennington began airing five days a week, in the 12 to 3PM time slot on Raw Dog Comedy. Additionally, they maintained their occasional Friday spot on Opie Radio.

On July 9, 2018, Bennington moved to Faction Talk 103 on Sirius XM, airing 2:00-5:00PM M-F ET.

On August 1, 2022, Bennington moved back to the 12 to 3PM time slot on Faction Talk 103 on Sirius XM.
