= Eddie Trunk =

American radio personality (born 1964)

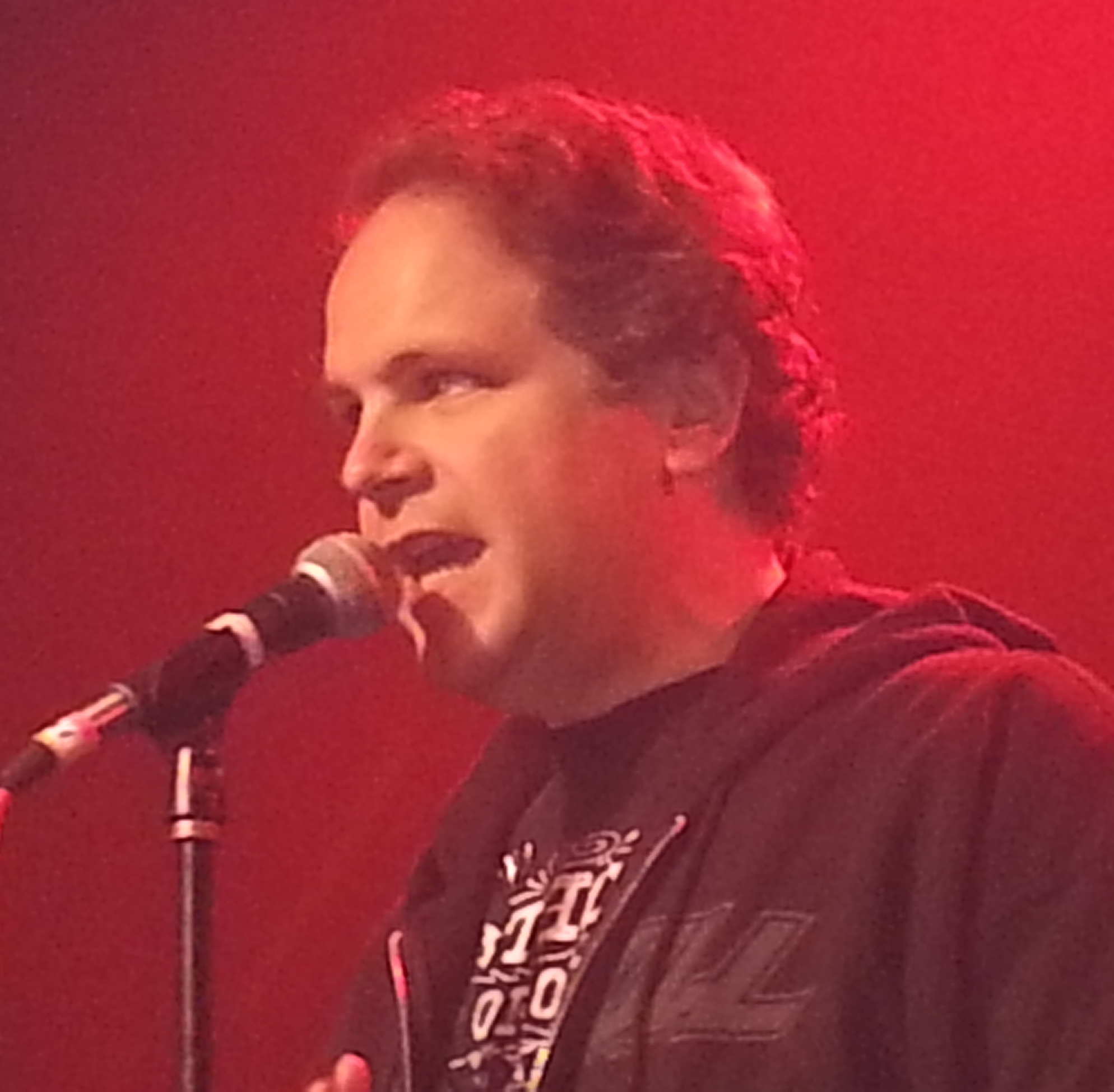
- Trunk at Ride for Dime, 2013
- Born: Edward Scott Trunk; August 8, 1964 (age 61); Madison, New Jersey, U.S.
- Occupations: Music historian, radio producer, radio personality, talk show host, author
- Years active: 1983–present
- Spouse: Jen Trunk (m. 2002)
- Children: 2

Edward Scott Trunk (born August 8, 1964) is an American music historian, radio personality, talk show host, and author, best known as the host of several hard rock- and heavy metal-themed radio and television shows.

== Biography ==
Trunk was born on August 8, 1964, in Summit, New Jersey. He grew up in Madison, New Jersey, where he attended Madison High School. As a teenager, Trunk became a fan of Kiss, Raspberries, and other bands including Aerosmith, Rush, UFO and Black Sabbath. During high school, he began to write reviews of records for school credit and soon found his passion in music.

Around 1986, Trunk became an employee of Megaforce Records which had signed both Metallica and Anthrax. He became vice president of the company at age 25. During that time, he earned executive producer credit on some works from bands like Anthrax, Raven, T.T. Quick, Manowar, Overkill, King's X, Prophet, Icon and Ace Frehley. In fact, Trunk was the main driving force behind reviving Ace Frehley's career, convincing Megaforce Records head Jon Zazula to sign Frehley to a solo deal.

Around 1997, WNEW FM was looking to become a more "heavy" station and move away from their classic rock playlist. Trunk was one of the first people hired for the new concept. He wanted to do a metal show for the station, and eventually Saturday Night Rocks was born. WNEW became a talk radio station, but Trunk's show was one of the few retained.

== Radio career ==
=== Former work ===
From late 1983 through 1994, Trunk became a fixture at WDHA, the station he grew up listening to. Over the 10 years he spent at DHA (all on a part-time basis), he hosted, produced, and programmed the stations popular metal show, in addition to doing regular airshifts, remote broadcasts, interviews, and promotions.

Trunk hosted Friday Night Rocks and Saturday Night Rocks for WNEW-FM in New York City until the radio station underwent a format change in 2003. He was also a regular disc jockey on Q104.3 before joining WNEW-FM and was a VJ who hosted the weekend episodes of Metal Mania on the cable television channel VH1 Classic.

He also hosted a weekly Saturday four-hour program on XM Radio's Ozzy's Boneyard Channel. Trunk was suspended after an interview with New York Mets catcher Mike Piazza in which Piazza was critical of XM Radio's programming on the Boneyard Channel. Trunk was not heard on XM again until late November 2006, when he appeared on the Ron and Fez show to announce his return to XM. He began hosting Eddie Trunk Live on the Boneyard beginning the first week in December 2006.

In May 2006, Guns N' Roses lead singer Axl Rose made a surprise visit on Trunk's Q104.3 radio show. Rose walked in unexpectedly to Trunk's radio studio in New York and spent two and a half hours live on the air with Trunk and other guests.

Trunk was also the host and co-producer of That Metal Show, which aired weekly on VH1 Classic from 2008 to 2015.

Trunk has written two books, Essential Hard Rock and Heavy Metal Vol 1 & 2.

Trunk revealed in 2019 that he had recorded backing vocals on Anthrax's 1989 cover of the KISS song "Parasite" and was credited in the special thanks as Ed "Parasite" Trunk.

=== Current work ===
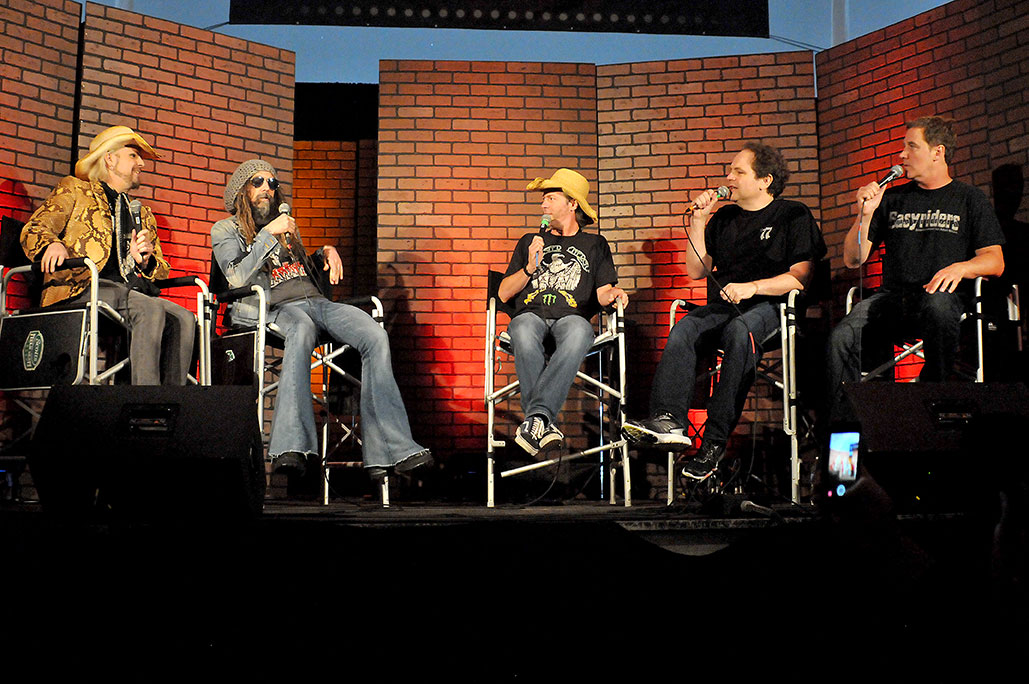
Trunk (second from right) with Rob Zombie and John 5 in 2016

As of 2012, Trunk's current work includes the nationally syndicated radio show, Eddie Trunk Rocks, which is recorded at the New York radio station, Q104.3 (WAXQ), on the FM frequency, and is syndicated by Radio KG. Trunk also hosts Trunk Nation on the Sirius XM Radio channels Faction Talk (Channel 103) and Hair Nation (Channel 39) (formerly known as Eddie Trunk Live when Trunk was with The Boneyard station), and is a music host and interviewer for the MSG Network, a cable network based out of New York City. He hosts "The Eddie Trunk Podcast" on PodcastOne.

Eddie hosted the Hall of Heavy Metal History for the first time on January 18, 2017. Trunk has continued to host the event every year since and he himself was inducted in 2024.

== Criticism of the Rock and Roll Hall of Fame ==
Trunk is outspoken in his contempt of the Rock and Roll Hall of Fame, calling it the "Hall of Shame". Trunk has blogged and commented over the open air on That Metal Show his disgust at the Hall for almost entirely ignoring heavy metal and hard rock, citing examples such as Dio being passed over in favor of Madonna and ABBA. Trunk became a voting member of The Rock and Roll Hall of Fame in 2015. As of January 2017, Trunk has somewhat backed away from his earlier criticism of the hall citing progress made in the enshrining of bands such as Rush, Kiss, Cheap Trick, Deep Purple, Def Leppard and Journey.
