= SiriusXM PGA Tour Radio =

- Broadcast area: United States; Canada

Programming
- Format: Sports talk

Ownership
- Owner: Sirius XM Radio

Links
- Website: SirusXM PGA Tour Radio

SiriusXM PGA Tour Radio (formerly PGA Tour Network) is a satellite radio channel on SiriusXM dedicated to coverage of golf—and in particular, the PGA Tour. The channel carries talk programming related to golf, including analysis, equipment reviews, education, as well as live hole-by-hole coverage of PGA Tour events, majors (in cooperation with terrestrial rightsholders such as Fox Sports Radio for the U.S. Open, and Westwood One for the PGA Championship), and other events. It is carried on XM channel 92, and Sirius channel 208.

The channel was established as part of a 2005 deal with its predecessor, XM Satellite Radio. The deal also included the rental and sale of XM2go receivers at PGA Tour events so that spectators could listen to the channel's coverage on-site. In 2018, Sirius XM extended its contract for PGA Tour radio rights through 2021.

In December 2013, it partnered with Golf Channel to feature audio simulcasts of its programming on the service, including its news programs Morning Drive and Golf Central.
