= Taintstick =

- Origin: Hollywood, California, United States
- Genres: Hard rock, heavy metal, alternative rock
- Years active: 2007–2010
- Label: Suburban Noize Records
- Past members: Jason Ellis; Michael Tully; Christian Hand; Josh Richmond; Benji Madden
- Website: Official Website

Taintstick was a satirical American hard rock band, signed to Suburban Noize Records. Their debut album released on October 27, 2009. In 2010, front man Jason Ellis, announced the end of the band after EllisMania 6 and the premiere of his new band, Death! Death! Die!.

Taintstick's music is regularly featured on SiriusXM radio's Faction (Sirius XM) channel, which has also broadcast extended programs featuring interviews with band members, and behind-the-scenes looks at the making of their album.

== Live performances ==
To date, the band has played three live shows. In October 2009, Taintstick performed with new member, bass guitarist Benji Madden from Good Charlotte at the club Wasted Space, in the Hard Rock Hotel and Casino in Las Vegas, NV. RawDog was on stage playing the keyboard and triangle after losing his bass player spot to Madden. When playing in October 2009, Blasko, bassist for Ozzy Osbourne jumped on stage and played bass for Tainstick's tribute to "Crazy Train".

The second show was announced for December 30, 2009 at the Roxy Theatre (West Hollywood) in West Hollywood, CA. Taintstick played before headliner and Subnoize labelmates Unwritten Law. Lead singer and founder, Jason Ellis, said on his live EllisMania.com show that the record label owner said "He thinks Taintstick could be something big and he's never seen a band win the crowd over like that in the 15 years he's been involved in the music business and that if I wanted to take it serious that we could really make a go of it, so maybe I will."

The third show they have performed at was at SRH fest 2010. They performed just after The Pricks and just before Kutt Calhoun.

== Releases ==
Taintstick's album Six Pounds of Sound was released on October 7, 2009.

Released on October 20, 2008, the video for their debut single "Apple Juice", featuring celebrities Tony Hawk, Rob Dyrdek, Amber Smith, Heidi Cortez, Angie Savage, Mayhem Miller, Ryo Chonan, King Mo, has over 180,000 views on YouTube.

== Discography ==
=== Albums ===
Year	Album details	Peak chart positions										Certifications (sales thresholds)
Year	Album details	CAN	AUT	FIN	GER	SWI	UK	US	US Heat	CAN iTunes	US iTunes	Certifications (sales thresholds)
2009	Six Pounds Of Sound: Released: October 27, 2009; Label: Suburban Noize Records; Format: CD	—	—	—	—	—	—	120	2	11	10	
"—" denotes a release that did not chart.

== Awards and achievements ==
Gibson Guitars selected Taintstick as one of "Today's Five Worst Band Names."

== Members ==
- Jason Ellis — Vocals
- Christian Hand — Drums, Production
- Michael Tully — Guitar
- Josh Richmond — Cowbell, Triangle, Keyboard
