= WWRM =

Radio station in Tampa

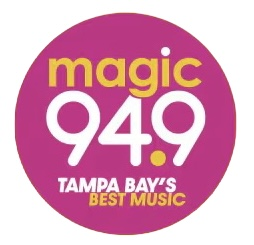
- Tampa, Florida; United States
- Broadcast area: Tampa Bay area
- Frequency: 94.9 MHz (HD Radio)
- RDS: MAGIC949
- Branding: Magic 94.9

Programming
- Language: English
- Format: Hot adult contemporary
- Subchannels: HD2: Alternative rock "97X"

Ownership
- Owner: Cox Media Group; (Cox Radio, LLC)
- Sister stations: WDUV; WHPT; WTBV; WXGL

History
- First air date: September 1, 1970
- Former call signs: WLCY-FM (1970–1977); WYNF (1977–1981); WYNF-FM (1981–1993)
- Call sign meaning: "Warm" (prior branding)

Technical information
- Licensing authority: FCC
- Facility ID: 74200
- Class: C
- ERP: 100,000 watts
- HAAT: 470 meters (1,540 ft)
- Transmitter coordinates: 27°49′12″N 82°15′39.6″W

Links
- Public license information: Public file; LMS
- Webcast: Listen live; Listen live (via iHeartRadio); Listen live (via Audacy); HD2: Listen live
- Website: www.mymagic949.com; HD2: www.97xonline.com

WWRM (94.9 FM) is a commercial radio station licensed to Tampa, Florida, and serving the Tampa Bay area. Owned by Cox Media Group, it airs a hot adult contemporary format. The station's studios and offices are located on 4th Street North in St. Petersburg.

WWRM has an effective radiated power (ERP) of 100,000 watts. Its transmitter site is shared with WTSP, Tampa's CBS TV network affiliate, off Rhodine Road in Riverview.

== History ==
=== Top 40 era ===
On September 1, 1970, the station signed on as WLCY-FM, and was licensed to St. Petersburg, Florida. It was put on the air by Rahall Communications, and was co-owned with WLCY and WLCY-TV. The studios were in the "Rahall Color Communications Center" on Gandy Boulevard. During the early 1970s, WLCY-FM was an automated station, airing Drake-Chenault's "Hit Parade" and TM's "Stereo Rock" formats.

Hoping to follow the sudden rise in popularity of local Top 40 station WRBQ-FM ("Q105") in the mid-1970s, WLCY-FM switched to live disc jockeys in 1976, using the moniker "Y95", using the whole-number frequency closest to 94.9. In 1977, it adopted a new call sign, WYNF, a convenient shorthand for "Y-Ninety-Five", following Rahall's sale of WLCY AM to Southern Broadcasting, the owners of competitor WRBQ.

=== Rock WYNF ===
In 1978, Taft Broadcasting bought the station; by 1980, it had rebranded WYNF as "95FM--Florida's Best Rock". The music changed from Top 40 to AOR, to compete with the dominant local AOR station, WQXM. WYNF's studios moved from St. Petersburg to Tampa, at 504 Reo Street (near Tampa International Airport), home of Taft's WDAE (1250 AM). Two years later, the station was re-branded "95ynf". WYNF began calling itself "The New 95".

In the early 1980s, WYNF again became a sister station to Channel 10 (now WTSP) after Taft acquired Gulf Broadcasting. (Around that time, WDAE was sold to Gannett, while Taft acquired WSUN (620 AM) from Plough, Inc.) In 1985, Taft sold WYNF to CBS Radio. The studios were relocated to 4th Street North in St. Petersburg at the Koger Executive Center. 95ynf dominated the Tampa Bay area for AOR music.

=== Ron and Ron ===
After trying out several morning teams including Nick van Cleve and Jack Strapp, and later replacing van Cleve with Ron Diaz, program director Carey Curelop paired Diaz with local comic Ron Bennington, creating the popular Ron and Ron morning show at WYNF in the late-1980s. The show was successful in the Arbitron ratings and Ron & Ron became known as "Radio's Bad Boys". Their agent Ross Reback helped them form The Ron & Ron Radio Network to own and syndicate the show to other FM stations.

The show's final broadcast on WYNF was on March 12, 1993. Reback became president and CEO of the newly formed network and negotiated deals to broadcast the show in Miami, Orlando and Jacksonville, with another dozen markets soon following (including a new more lucrative deal with WSUN).

=== Switch to WWRM ===
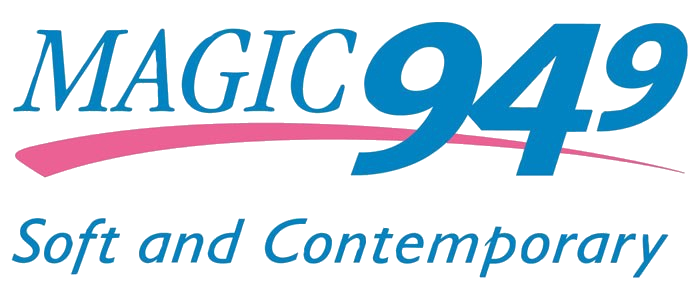
Logo of the radio station between 2010 and February 2012

In 1993, Cox Broadcasting, owners of WWRM (107.3 FM), bought WYNF, as part of a trade with CBS Radio, also involving stations in Dallas. The studios were relocated back to St. Petersburg at The Koger Center. By that point, rival rock station WXTB had surpassed WYNF in the Arbitron ratings, eventually forcing WYNF to make a format change.

On August 16, 1993, at 10 am, WYNF stopped playing rock music and began simulcasting WSUN's talk radio programming. Seven days later, Cox relocated the soft adult contemporary format of "Warm 107" and its WWRM call sign to 94.9, becoming "Warm 94.9".

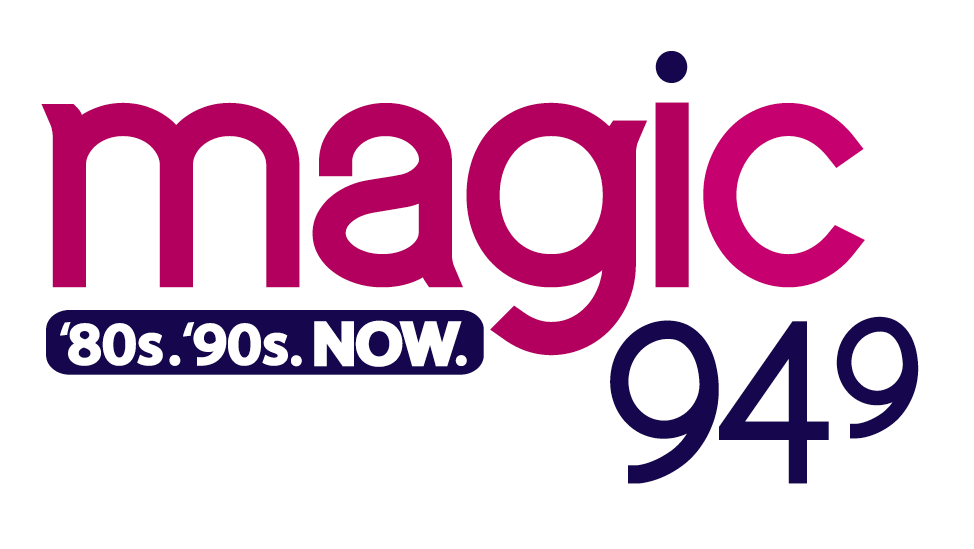
Logo of the radio station between 2012 and 2017

On January 5, 2001, the station had a minor overhaul, becoming "The New Magic 94.9", though keeping the format and WWRM call sign. WWRM evolved to more of a mainstream AC format by 2001, while its new sister station WDUV concentrated on the softer AC hits. In May 2011, after ten years of being called "The New Magic 94.9", the station dropped "The New" in its name, becoming simply "Magic 94.9".
