= WHPT =

- Sarasota, Florida; United States
- Broadcast area: Tampa Bay area
- Frequency: 102.5 MHz (HD Radio)
- Branding: 102.5 The Bone

Programming
- Format: Hot talk
- Subchannels: HD2: Simulcast of WXGL
- Affiliations: Tampa Bay Lightning; South Florida Bulls football

Ownership
- Owner: Cox Media Group; (Cox Radio, LLC)
- Sister stations: WDUV; WTBV; WWRM; WXGL

History
- First air date: November 15, 1960
- Former call signs: WYAK (1960–1967); WSAF-FM (1967–1973); WQSR (1973–1979); WSRZ (1979–1984); WAVE-FM (1984–1986); WHVE (1986–1991)
- Call sign meaning: "The Point" (former branding)

Technical information
- Licensing authority: FCC
- Facility ID: 51986
- Class: C
- ERP: 100,000 watts
- HAAT: 503 meters (1,650 ft)
- Transmitter coordinates: 27°24′31.2″N 82°14′59.3″W

Links
- Public license information: Public file; LMS
- Webcast: Listen live Listen live (via Audacy)
- Website: www.theboneonline.com

WHPT (102.5 FM) is a commercial radio station licensed to Sarasota, Florida, and serving the Tampa Bay area. Owned by Cox Media Group, it broadcasts a hot talk format. It is also the flagship station for Tampa Bay Lightning hockey and carries South Florida Bulls football. WHPT's studios and offices are on 4th Street North in St. Petersburg.

WHPT is a Class C station with an effective radiated power (ERP) of 100,000 watts, the maximum for most stations. The transmitter site is off 283rd Street East near Gopher Hill Road in Myakka City, an unincorporated area of southwest Manatee County. WHPT broadcasts using HD Radio technology. Its HD2 subchannel airs a simulcast of WXGL 107.3 FM.

== History ==
=== WYAK - WSAF-FM ===
The station signed on the air on November 15, 1960. Its original call sign was WYAK. It was a rare stand-alone FM station in an era where most were co-owned with AM or TV stations. It was owned by the Multitone Music Corporation with studios at 1375 Fifth Street. It was powered at 2,750 watts, a fraction of its current output.

In 1967, the station was acquired by Stewart Broadcasting, the owners of WSAF 1220 AM (now WSRQ). The call letters were changed to WSAF-FM and the two stations began simulcasting most of their programming.

=== WQSR ===
In 1973, the Sarasota Radio Company purchased WSAF-FM and changed its format to beautiful music. It played quarter-hour sweeps of soft instrumentals with Broadway and Hollywood show tunes. The call sign was switched to WQSR. Those call letters reflected company president, Edward Rogers', philosophy: QSR: Quality Stereo Radio.

For several years, WQSR playing beautiful music from 6 a.m. to 6 p.m., and progressive rock from 6 p.m. to 6 a.m. The station finally pulled the plug on the daytime format when ratings and advertising sales clearly indicated the community's preference for rock and roll. During part of this period, the station added quadraphonic sound, and promoted itself as "Quad One-Oh-Two-And-A-Half". The free-form rock music format would eventually suffer challenges from better-researched album rock formats that eroded its Arbitron ratings. In 1991, the call sign was switched to the current WHPT, which stood for "The Point", the station's moniker at the time. That was given up a few years later, when the station started calling itself "The Bone" while keeping the same call letters.

=== Hot talk ===
Over time, the DJs were given more freedom to add comedy and other comments to their radio shows. Management noted that was becoming more popular than the music the station played. In April 2012, WHPT fully transitioned to hot talk, while keeping "The Bone" moniker.

In September 2022, Cox Radio announced that WHPT would be the new flagship station of the Tampa Bay Lightning of the National Hockey League. The station also began using its HD2 subchannel for 24/7 Lightning-focused programming, which included original live programming, game replays, podcasts, and more. In 2022, WHPT also became the flagship station of University of South Florida sports, including Bulls football, men's basketball, and women's basketball.
