= Jason Ellis =

Australian radio host and skateboarder

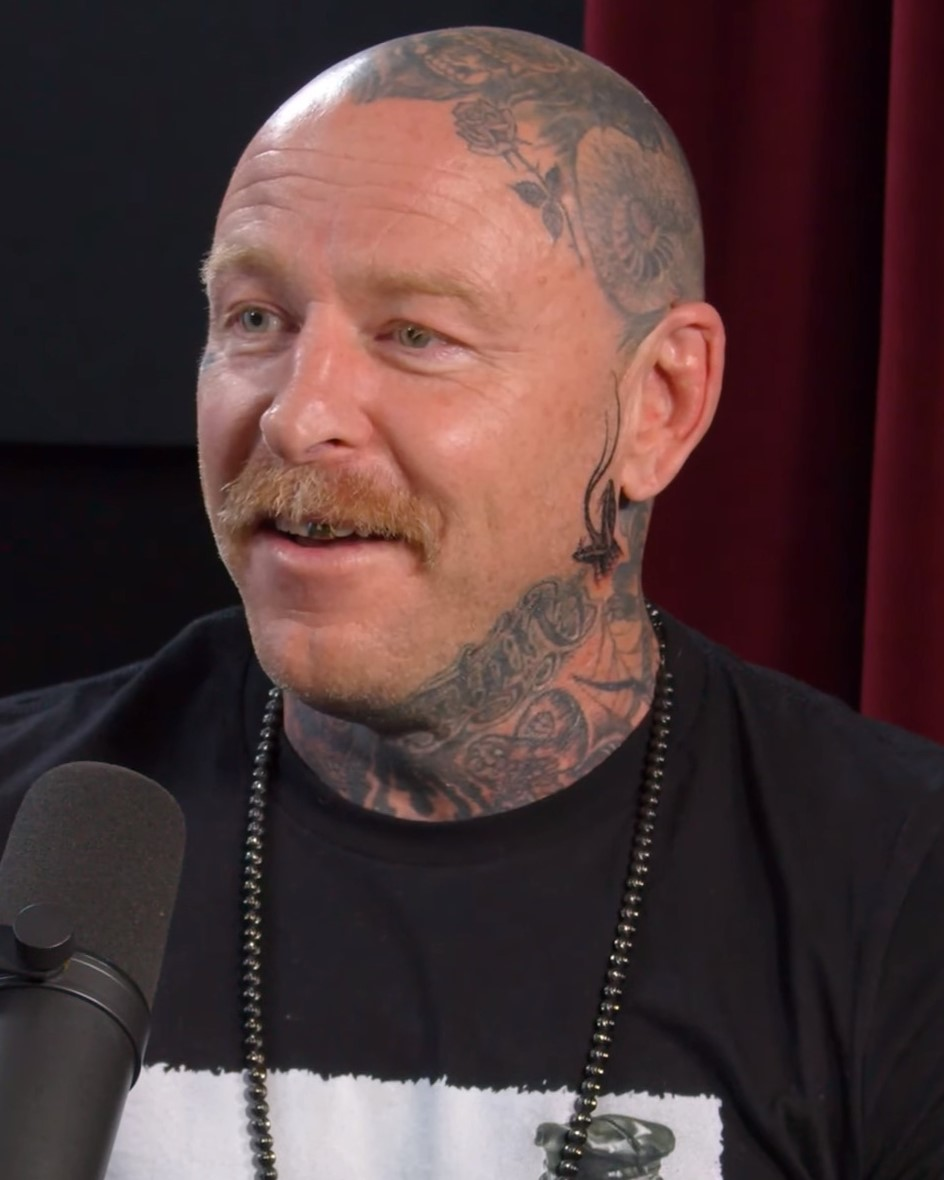
- Ellis in 2024
- Born: Jason Shane Ellis; 11 October 1971 (age 55); Melbourne, Victoria, Australia
- Height: 5 ft 11 in (1.80 m)
- Weight: 205 lb (93 kg; 14.6 st)
- Division: Middleweight
- Fighting out of: Hollywood, California, U.S.
- Team: Team Quest, Onnit Fortune Boxing, Wolfknives
- Years active: 1987–present

Mixed martial arts record
- Total: 2
- Wins: 2
- By submission: 2
- Losses: 0

Other information
- Occupation: Radio personality, podcaster, professional skateboarder, truck racer, rock singer, actor, author
- Mixed martial arts record from Sherdog

Jason Shane Ellis (born 11 October 1971) is an Australian radio personality who is best known as the host of The Jason Ellis Show on SiriusXM satellite radio, which aired from 2005 to 2020. He is also a former professional skateboarder, auto racer, and singer.

== Athletics and sports ==
=== Professional skateboarding ===
Ellis moved to the US when he was 17 to embark on a professional skateboarding career, which began in 1985. He retired from the sport in 2006. In 2001, Ellis set a Guinness World Record for the biggest drop on a skateboard, jumping into a 70-foot skateboard ramp. The record was broken by Danny Way in 2006.

One of the six Big Air competitors to compete in both 2004 and 2005, Ellis was suffering from a concussion in 2005 and didn't make the final, finishing tenth overall. Still involved in the skate community, Ellis has performed skate demos alongside Tony Hawk, is a perennial X-Games competitor in the Mega Ramp competition, and was the host of the annual 'Tony Hawk's Boom Boom Huckjam'.

=== Mixed martial arts ===
Ellis formerly trained in the Team Quest camp located in Murrieta, California, under the direction of Dan Henderson, Jason "Mayhem" Miller, and Muhammed Lawal. He also trains with Justin Fortune at Fortune Boxing Gym in Hollywood, California.

Ellis made his mixed martial arts debut against Brazilian jiu-jitsu specialist Tony Gianopulos on 6 February 2009 winning via guillotine choke submission.

On 6 May 2017, Ellis defeated Gabe Rivas via an Americana submission, 1 second away from the end of the 3rd round. Advancing Ellis to 2-0 in professional mixed martial arts. They fought at 190 lbs (86.2 kg) in San Jacinto, California.

==== Mixed martial arts record ====
Professional record breakdown
2 matches	2 wins	0 losses
By submission	2	0

Res.	Record	Opponent	Method	Event	Date	Round	Time	Location	Notes
Win	2–0	Gabe Rivas	Submission (americana)	KOTC: Ground Breaking	6 May 2017	3	4:59	San Jacinto, California, United States	
Win	1–0	Tony Gianopulos	Submission (guillotine choke)	Sheckler Foundation: Down for Life – Fight for a Cause	6 February 2009	2	2:21	Anaheim, California, United States	

=== Truck racing ===
For the 2011 season, Ellis raced in the Lucas Oil SuperLite Series for Dethrone. At a number of events, he did his Friday morning radio show from his R.V.

=== Boxing ===
After a three-year hiatus from MMA, Ellis returned to the sport on 14 July 2012 defeating UFC veteran Gabe Ruediger via KO in the second round in a celebrity non-professional boxing fight. Gabe Ruediger has since challenged Ellis to a rematch, citing that he did not take the first fight seriously. After being dropped by Ellis, Gabe lost their rematch to a decision.

On 15 October 2016, Ellis participated in a boxing exhibition match against Former interim UFC Heavyweight Champion Shane Carwin at EllisMania 13. Per the unique rules, Carwin had one of his arms duct-taped to his body to box Ellis. Ellis lost the bout via knockout in the second round.

== Media ==
=== Hawk vs Wolf podcast ===
Ellis hosts the podcast Hawk vs Wolf with Tony Hawk. On December 24, 2024, Hawk announced an indefinite hiatus for the Hawk vs Wolf podcast.

In August 2023, Ellis publicly accused Kast Media and its CEO Colin Thomson of non-payment, stating, "If you see Colin Thomson named on any podcast, just know that's who you're dealing with. And if you're a podcaster and any of those guys reach out to you, just know that I haven't met a bigger piece of shit." Corresponding accusations were originally made by pro wrestling personality Jim Cornette followed by Theo Von, Brendan Schaub, Bryan Callen, Whitney Cummings, and Alyx Weiss, who stated they were owed money by Kast Media, including several six-figure and seven-figure shortages.

=== Radio host ===
Ellis launched his radio career as a co-host of Hawk's Demolition Radio on a part-time basis. He soon became the host of his own show on the network.

Following his skateboarding career, Ellis became a host for the Sirius XM satellite radio station and launched The Jason Ellis Show. The show was cancelled on SiriusXM on 11-22-2020, and has since continued as a podcast.

=== Filmography ===
Year	Film	Role	Notes
1993	Impending Doom	Doom	
1996	Whiskey 2: The Adventures of Boozy the Clown	Himself	
2001	CKY3	Himself	
2002	ESPN's Ultimate X: The Movie	Himself	
2002	Gigantic Skate Park Tour	Himself	TV
2002	Wild World of Spike	Himself	
2002	xXx	Van Video Shooter	
2003	Haggard: The Movie	Cactus at Record Bin	
2003	Viva La Bam	Himself	TV
2004	Sakenara	Manny	
2004	Zolar	Himself	Cameo
2005	Tony Hawk's American Wasteland	Himself	Video Game – Playable Character
2006	Fuse Celebrity Playlist	Host – Himself	TV
2008	Ninja Cheerleaders	Himself	
2009	Paul Blart Mall Cop	Prancer	
2010	The Woodsman	The Woodsman	Internet
2011	Ellismania	Host - Himself	TV
2012	Big Fucking Megaboat	Skeet McRib	Internet
2017	I'm A Super Huge (unit), Own It	Himself	Internet/Post Production

=== Music ===
Ellis was also the founding member and vocalist for the comedy rock/metal band, Taintstick, which achieved chart success with its debut album Six Pounds of Sound. Taintstick has since become known as "Death! Death! Die!"

=== Other media ===
Ellis co-authored I'm Awesome: One Man's Triumphant Quest to Become the Sweetest Dude Ever in 2013, and The Awesome Guide to Life: Get Fit, Get Laid, Get Your Sh*t Together in 2014.

== Personal life ==
From 2006 to 2012, Ellis was married to Andrea Brown. They have a daughter and a son. In August 2017, Ellis married Katie Gilbert. In December 2016, Ellis and Gilbert appeared on the This Life With Dr. Drew and Bob Forrest podcast where he spoke about his past addictions and sobriety, as well as the trauma he experienced after the death of his brother Stevie.

In 2016, Ellis announced he is bisexual. He affirmed his sexuality in 2019, stating: "Bit scared to talk about it. But I am a bi guy and I think it's ok. Not here for a shoutout just letting others know it's ok to be you too. I'm happy".
