= The Jason Ellis Show =

- Genre: Talk
- Running time: Monday–Friday (ET) (5:00 pm – 8:00 pm)
- Country of origin: United States
- Language: English
- Home station: SiriusXM Faction Talk 103; The Jason Ellis Sirius XM Online Channel 791
- Hosted by: Jason Ellis; Michael Tully and Josh Richmond
- Starring: Kevin Kraft, Andrew Gruss, and Will Pendarvis
- Recording studio: SiriusXM Studios, 6420 Wilshire Boulevard, Los Angeles, California
- Original release: May 4, 2005 – November 24, 2020
- Audio format: Stereo
- Ending theme: Theme from Enter the Dragon
- Website: www.therealjasonellis.com

The Jason Ellis Show was a radio show on SiriusXM hosted by Australian radio personality, skateboarder, and mixed martial artist Jason Ellis that aired from May 2005 to November 2020. It aired on the uncensored channels Faction Talk and Internet Radio Nonstop xL 791.

The show premiered on May 4, 2005. It was largely unscripted and involved Ellis speaking his opinion on current events, relationship issues, life advice, Hollywood and national news, and sports such as mixed martial arts, Motocross, and auto racing. The show was co-hosted by former producer Michael Tully, and Josh Richmond, and includes regular appearances from Will Pendarvis, Kevin "Coolbeans" Kraft, Andrew "The Giant" Gruss, Luke "Dingo" Trembath, and Mike Catherwood. The show often includes segments consisting of trivia games, unsigned band music reviews, and other comedy-centric discussions and interviews that often involve the celebrity guests of the talk show. Throughout the broadcast and towards the end of the show, listeners call in to discuss the current topics, or ask for relationship and life advice.

The show's adult language and sexually explicit content is part of the appeal to many listeners who see the show as a shock jock style broadcast. A group of regular listeners and fans of the show refer to themselves as the EllisFam and others formed a club called The Wolfknives. Fans often purchase and wear Wolfknives clothing merchandise (a company owned and operated by Jason himself) and are given nicknames chosen by Jason, Mike Tully, and Will Pendarvis on air.

On November 24, 2020, Ellis and Tully announced that they were fired from Sirius XM, ending the program after 15 years. They have continued the show as a podcast.
