= Jim Norton & Sam Roberts =

American radio show on SiriusXM

- Genre: Talk
- Running time: Monday–Thursday ET (8:00 am – 11:00 am)
- Country of origin: United States
- Home station: SiriusXM Faction Talk 103
- Starring: Jim Norton; Sam Roberts
- Original release: October 4, 2016 – December 2024
- Website: siriusxm.com/factiontalk

Jim Norton & Sam Roberts is an American radio show hosted by Jim Norton and Sam Roberts that aired from October 2016 through December 2024. The show originated from New York City and aired live on weekday mornings on Faction Talk, an uncensored channel on the subscription-based satellite radio service SiriusXM. The show was also available on-demand through the SiriusXM app.

== History ==
In early 2001, Norton became a co-host of Opie and Anthony on WNEW in New York City, with hosts Gregg "Opie" Hughes and Anthony Cumia. He first appeared on the show in 2000 with Andrew Dice Clay during his time opening for him on tour and became a regular guest and sat in on some shows. On July 3, 2014, the show, then broadcasting on SiriusXM satellite radio, ended after Cumia was fired for posting a series of "racially charged" tweets following an alleged off-air incident with a black woman on the street. Hughes and Norton then became hosts of Opie with Jim Norton, which aired until September 2016.

Roberts began his radio career on WERW at Syracuse University before interning on the Opie and Anthony radio show on XM Satellite Radio on June 13, 2005, based in New York City. In 2006, he became the show's associate producer, followed by producer in January 2010. In April 2011, Roberts became the host of the pre and post Opie and Anthony radio show, and became the show's executive producer in February 2014. From June 2015 to October 2016, Roberts hosted Sam Roberts' Show.

In October 2016, growing differences between Hughes and Norton led to Hughes hosting The Opie Radio Show in afternoons and Norton and Roberts doing Jim Norton & Sam Roberts as the new morning show. In October 2018, Norton and Roberts renewed their contracts to continue the show for another three years. Beginning October 15, 2018, the show's start time moved from 8:00 a.m. to 7:00 a.m and ran for four hours. In 2021, the start time moved back to 8:00 in the morning. They signed extensions on their contracts to last through December 2021. They then re-signed through 2024. In January 2025, Norton revealed that he and SiriusXM had parted ways after failing to come to terms on a contract renewal, ending the Jim Norton & Sam Roberts show after eight years.

== Incidents ==
On October 11, 2016, Norton and Roberts had Nancy Grace as a guest and accused her of capitalizing on the tragedy of others for her personal gain. They also addressed her handling of wrestler Ultimate Warrior's death, and the Duke lacrosse case. Norton admitted during the interview that he had disliked her for some time, and said Grace had blocked him on Twitter. Grace, in defense, stated that she was a crime victim herself, and left the show early, arguing that Norton and Roberts did not ask her one decent question. Grace addressed her appearance the following day on The View and called Norton and Roberts "Beavis and Butt-head". She claimed that she had held back tears during the interview and described the appearance as "hell for me".

In November 2017, Jim Norton and Sam Roberts made news again with the interview of Jon Bernthal. Bernthal described Kevin Spacey, who had faced recent sexual assault charges, of making him uncomfortable on the set of Baby Driver. Bernthal stated that he "lost all respect" for Spacey and that "he was a bit of a bully".

In January 2019, Jim Norton & Sam Roberts conducted the final interview with Roger Stone before his arrest.
