= WXGL =

- St. Petersburg, Florida; United States
- Broadcast area: Tampa Bay area
- Frequency: 107.3 MHz (HD Radio)
- Branding: 107-3 The Eagle

Programming
- Language: English
- Format: Classic hits

Ownership
- Owner: Cox Media Group; (Cox Radio, LLC)
- Sister stations: WDUV; WHPT; WTBV; WWRM

History
- First air date: September 1, 1965
- Former call signs: WPIN-FM (1965–70); WWBA-FM (1970–88); WWRM (1988–93); WCOF (1993–99); WBBY (1999–2004)
- Call sign meaning: a play on "Eagle"

Technical information
- Licensing authority: FCC
- Facility ID: 74199
- Class: C1
- ERP: 100,000 watts
- HAAT: 182 meters (597 ft)
- Transmitter coordinates: 28°2′23.1″N 82°39′11.4″W

Links
- Public license information: Public file; LMS
- Webcast: Listen live; Listen live (via Audacy); Listen live (via iHeartRadio)
- Website: www.1073theeagle.com

WXGL (107.3 FM) is a commercial radio station licensed to St. Petersburg, Florida, and serving the Tampa Bay Area. It is owned by Cox Media Group and calls itself "The Eagle". WXGL airs a classic hits radio format that leans toward classic rock, primarily from the 1980s, 90s and 2000s, although occasionally going older. Unlike rival classic hits station WRBQ-FM, The Eagle does not play pop or dance music from artists such as Madonna or Michael Jackson. WXGL broadcasts in the HD Radio format.

WXGL's studios are located in St. Petersburg on 4th Street North. The transmitter site is off Burbank Road in Oldsmar.

== Streaming ==
In addition to the Eagle website, streaming via the iHeartRadio website and smartphone app was available since summer 2012. Subsequently, a smartphone app solely for "The Eagle" was launched the following summer.
