= WDUV =

New Port Richey, Florida; United States
- Broadcast area: Tampa Bay area
- Frequency: 105.5 MHz (HD Radio)
- Branding: 105.5 The Dove

Programming
- Format: Soft adult contemporary
- Affiliations: Premiere Networks

Ownership
- Owner: Cox Media Group; (Cox Radio, LLC)
- Sister stations: WHPT; WTBV; WWRM; WXGL

History
- First air date: November 1963
- Former call signs: WBRD-FM (1963–1969); WGUL-FM (1969–1981); WPSO (1981–1983); WGUL-FM (1983–1995); WTBT (1995–1999)
- Call sign meaning: "Dove"

Technical information
- Licensing authority: FCC
- Facility ID: 1178
- Class: C1
- ERP: 33,000 watts
- HAAT: 458 meters (1,503 ft)
- Transmitter coordinates: 28.183°N 82.768°W

Links
- Public license information: Public file; LMS
- Webcast: Listen live Listen live (via iHeartRadio); Listen live (via Audacy)
- Website: www.wduv.com

WDUV (105.5 FM, "The Dove") is a commercial radio station licensed to New Port Richey, Florida, United States, and serving the Tampa Bay Area. Owned by Cox Radio, the station broadcasts a soft adult contemporary format. WDUV's studios and offices are in St. Petersburg and the transmitter is sited off of Dartmouth Drive in Holiday. The station also broadcasts in HD Radio.

== History ==
=== Beautiful music ===
The station signed on the air in November 1963. The original call sign was WBRD-FM. It had a beautiful music format and was formerly licensed to Bradenton in Manatee County. It originally broadcast at 103.3 FM. The station shared the same studio facilities on Tamiami Trail in Bradenton with WBRD (1420 AM), and the Bradenton news bureau of ABC network affiliate WXLT-TV 40 (now WWSB). At the time, all three stations were owned by the same family.

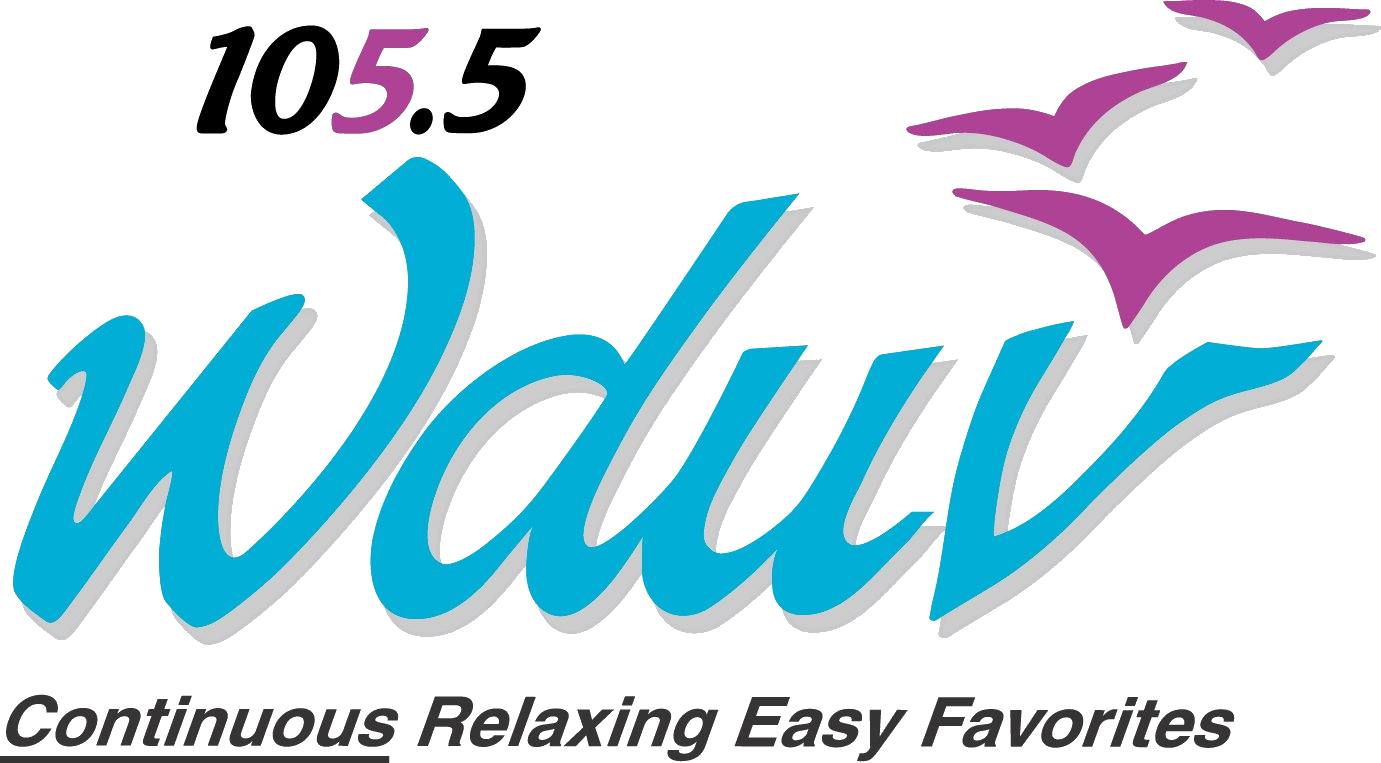
Former logo of the radio station used between July 2000 and June 2012

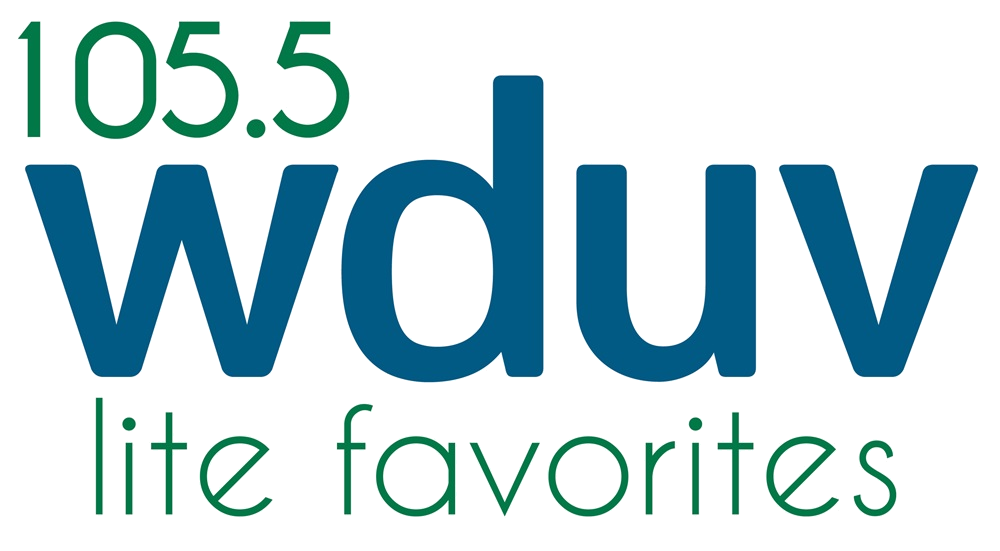
Previous logo used between June 2012 and November 2024

In the early-1990s, WDUV relocated its frequency to 103.5 FM to improve its coverage area in the Tampa Bay area. By the mid-1990s, WDUV was acquired by Jacor Broadcasting (since absorbed by Clear Channel Communications). The studios were relocated to St. Petersburg. As recently as 1997, WDUV continued to play about 50% instrumental music and 50% vocals, one of the last stations to play that many instrumental titles.

=== Frequency swap ===
On April 5, 1999, at midnight, WDUV swapped its frequency with classic rock station WTBT, moving from 103.5 to 105.5 FM. However, both frequencies would retain their transmitting locations and cities of license. After the swap, WDUV became licensed to New Port Richey with transmitting facilities in Holiday, while WTBT, whose transmitter was located in Riverview, became licensed to Bradenton. (WTBT, now WFUS, has since been relicensed to Gulfport.) While the new WDUV's transmitter is more powerful, it is also further away from the population center of the Tampa-St. Petersburg-Clearwater radio market than WDUV's former transmitter. Because WDUV is aimed at an older audience, Cox saw more potential gain with WTBT at 103.5.

Shortly after the swap, Clear Channel sold WDUV to its present owner, Cox Radio. Cox is based in Atlanta and has holdings in radio, television, cable and newspapers.

=== Format evolution ===
Currently, the station specializes in playing an oldies-based soft adult contemporary format, described on the air as "Continuous Lite Favorites." Since the early 2000s, the station's music mix has evolved from an "easy listening" format featuring a sprinkling of "adult standards" artists such as Frank Sinatra, Barbra Streisand, and Nat "King" Cole. It has transitioned its current direction of softer hits from chiefly the 1970s to the 1990s with most of the focus on the 1980s. Artists frequently heard on the station include Stevie Wonder, Elton John, Whitney Houston, Billy Joel, Kool and the Gang, Fleetwood Mac, Phil Collins, Madonna, Hall & Oates, Michael Jackson, and The Eagles.

The station's former "super-soft" format featured one or two smooth jazz instrumentals each hour, as a reminder of its past instrumental beautiful music format. With the purge of the "adult standards" artists from the station's playlist and the addition of some more recent and more upbeat songs, the smooth jazz instrumentals were also dropped. The station rarely plays any song recorded after 2000, to avoid overlapping with co-owned adult contemporary music station WWRM 94.9, whose format is more contemporary.

== Programming ==
WDUV is one of the highest-rated radio stations in a large market. WDUV is consistently number one in Tampa Bay, often with double the listeners of the number two station, according to Nielsen Audio, a noted radio ratings firm. WDUV's success prompted owner Cox Radio to put the same format on multiple of its other FM stations, some notable examples being WFEZ in Miami and WEZI in Jacksonville.

WDUV's popular morning show, which airs from 6 to 10 a.m., was hosted by veteran radio personality Dick Ring until he left the station on April 27, 2012. The following Monday, Ring, who retired to North Carolina, was replaced by Ann Kelly, the then-afternoon drive time host for WWRM. Mike Kruz is heard in middays and Kristy Knight in afternoons. The station airs the syndicated Delilah show in the evening. The rest of the hours are automated and without DJs, which was how WDUV operated since its origins as an easy listening station. Most pre-recorded liners simply tell listeners that they are hearing "105.5 The Dove," with little other dialogue.
