= Fez Whatley =

American talk radio host (1964–2021)

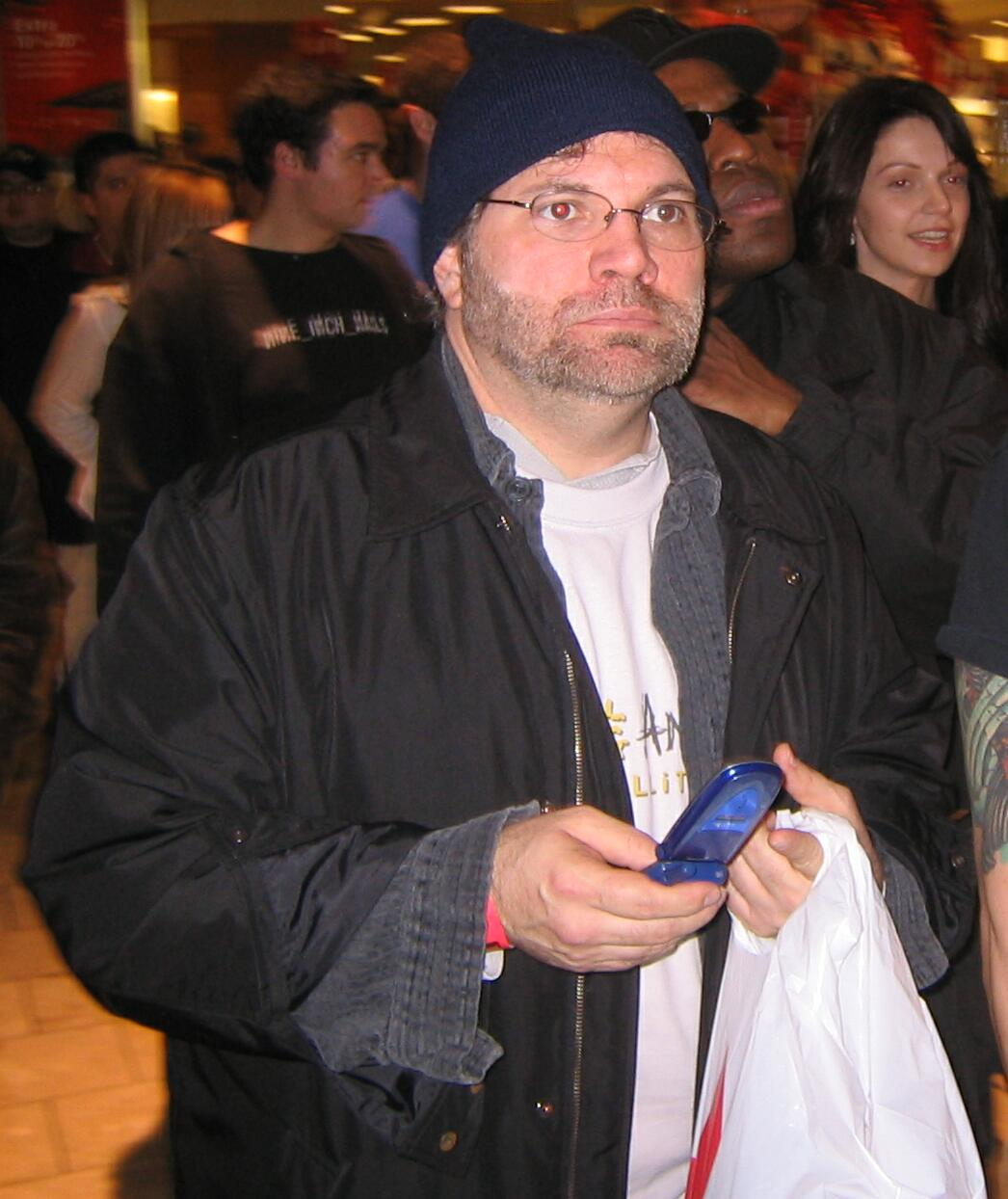
- Whatley in 2006
- Born: Todd Hillier; March 31, 1964; Florida, United States
- Died: August 14, 2021 (aged 57); United States
- Presenting career
- Show: Ron and Fez
- Stations: WKRO, WNEW-FM, Raw Dog Comedy (SiriusXM Channel 99)
- Time slot: 12:00 pm - 3:00 pm ET; Monday - Friday
- Style: Radio host, comedian
- Country: United States

Todd Hillier (March 31, 1964 – August 14, 2021), better known by his on-air name Fez Marie Whatley, was an American comedian and radio producer and personality who gained prominence as the co-host of The Ron and Fez Show with Ron Bennington from 1998 to 2015.

Whatley originally became well known after becoming a producer and contributor for the popular syndicated radio program The Ron and Ron Show. The show disbanded after being cancelled for low ratings following the departure of Ron Diaz. Whatley then teamed up with Ron Bennington to create The Ron and Fez Show on a small Daytona Beach radio station (WKRO). The duo subsequently created a show titled Ron and Fez Dot Com as they moved to overnights on WNEW-FM in New York City.

== Radio career ==
=== The Ron and Ron Show ===
In 1990, Whatley was an on-air personality at WYNF in Tampa Bay, Florida and producer and contributor for the syndicated morning program, The Ron and Ron Show. During this time, he developed the Fez Whatley moniker which a reporter in The Orlando Sentinel described as "an effeminate, lisping character." After the show disbanded due to being cancelled for low ratings after the departure of Ron Diaz, Whatley then teamed up with Ron Bennington as a co-host to create The Ron and Fez Show on WKRO FM, a small Daytona Beach, Florida rock station. After a relatively short stint there, they then retitled the show: Ron and Fez Dot Com and premiered on overnights on New York City radio station WNEW-FM on April 17, 2000.

=== The Ron and Fez Show ===
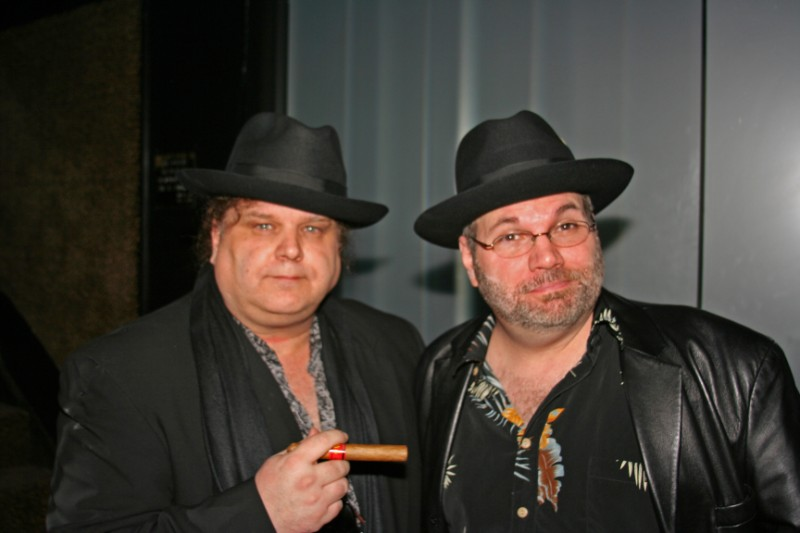
Whatley with Ron Bennington, 2007

Whatley and Bennington continued on WNEW until the end of 2002, as well as being simulcast to a few other FM markets, including WJFK-FM in Washington, D.C. After being canceled in New York City, as well as the other markets, due to a format change at WNEW-FM, they continued to broadcast from WJFK FM, and relocated to DC.

On July 19, 2004, Whatley and Bennington unceremoniously returned to the Florida airwaves in the 1 pm to 3 pm slot on Tampa Bay, Florida's The Buzz WBAA-AM 1010, a relatively low wattage station which adopted a new talk format, and abandoned its former sports talk format. The duo didn't produce well in the ratings however, and their tenure was short lived.

The Ron and Fez Show moved to XM Satellite Radio on September 12, 2005, after leaving WJFK 106.7 FM in Washington D.C.

On December 20, 2006 The Ron and Fez Show premiered on 92.3 Free FM in New York City from 6 to 9 pm, while still holding on to their XM Satellite Radio show from Noon to 3 pm. The Ron and Fez Show was discontinued when WFNY reverted to a rock format as WXRK on May 24, 2007.

From October 9, 2007, to June 27, 2008, Whatley also served as executive producer.

On November 4, 2008, Bennington and Whatley hosted Presidential Thunderdome '08, a live radio show covering the 2008 presidential elections.

On February 26, 2010, Whatley put up a $1,000 cash reward for the apprehension, conviction, and incarceration of the vandals who defaced the Mount Airy, North Carolina statue depicting Sheriff Andy Taylor and Opie Taylor of the 1960s television show The Andy Griffith Show. Whatley worked with the Mount Airy Crime Stoppers Division as they monitored the case.

On April 1, 2015, Whatley announced his retirement from radio. His final appearance on The Ron and Fez Show took place two days later.

=== Other radio ventures ===
Whatley also briefly co-hosted another of The Ron & Ron Radio Network's programs, the Hooters-on-the-Radio show with Brenda Lee (aka B.L.), Julie Williams and Hooters spokesperson and original Hooters girl (and Playboy's Miss July 1986) Lynne Austin in addition to his duties on The Ron & Ron Show.

== Personal life ==
Whatley graduated from Pinellas Park High School in Largo, Florida in 1982, and received a publication award from the International Thespian Society.

On February 24, 2012, Whatley came out as gay. Fez had been playing a flamboyant character on the air for more than 20 years, but became increasingly uncomfortable in the role after recognizing his sexual orientation and being unable to publicly embrace it. After admitting his sexuality to his co-host Ron Bennington three years earlier, Whatley spoke openly on the air about his issues as a closeted man, but had remained unable to say it explicitly. He chose to come out on the one-year anniversary of his father's death.

In 2012, Whatley participated in the New York LGBT Pride March.

=== Health issues and death ===
Whatley suffered a mild heart attack on November 9, 2005, which he did not recognize. After broadcasting his show the next day, he consulted a doctor who informed him that he had had heart attack, and was additionally diagnosed with diabetes. An angioplasty was performed and Whatley returned to the show on November 28, 2005.

Following an interview on May 9, 2007, with author Elmore Leonard, Whatley left the studio during the show to check into an emergency room, and had a second stent inserted May 11, 2007.

On September 24, 2010, Whatley was diagnosed with a third heart attack while in the hospital for treatment for an unrelated medical issue. He was released from the hospital after three days.

In July 2014, Whatley underwent anterior cervical discectomy surgery to relieve neck and back pain. A year later, Bennington announced on The Anthony Cumia Show that Whatley had suffered his fifth heart attack, and had a total of thirteen stents inserted. In March 2021, Bennington posted on his Instagram account that Whatley had suffered "another massive heart attack" and had flatlined before being revived.

In August 2021, Whatley suffered a heart attack while undergoing surgery, and was placed on a ventilator. On August 14, he died of heart failure at age 57.
