= WTBV =

Radio station in St. Petersburg, Florida

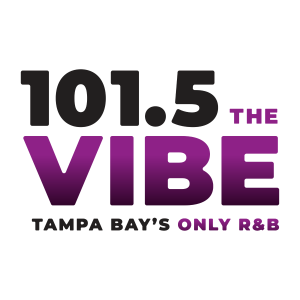
- St. Petersburg, Florida; United States
- Broadcast area: Tampa Bay area
- Frequency: 101.5 MHz (HD Radio)
- Branding: 101.5 The Vibe

Programming
- Format: Urban adult contemporary
- Subchannels: HD2: Alternative rock "97X"

Ownership
- Owner: Cox Media Group; (Cox Radio, LLC)
- Sister stations: WDUV; WHPT; WWRM; WXGL

History
- First air date: July 1, 1961; 64 years ago
- Former call signs: WGNB (1961–1974); WKES (1974–1997); WILV (1997–1998); WFJO (1998–2002); WPOI (2002–2023)
- Call sign meaning: Tampa Bay's Vibe

Technical information
- Licensing authority: FCC
- Facility ID: 66013
- Class: C
- ERP: 100,000 watts
- HAAT: 470 meters (1,540 ft)
- Transmitter coordinates: 27°49′12″N 82°15′39.6″W
- Translator: HD2: 97.5 W248CA (St. Petersburg)

Links
- Public license information: Public file; LMS
- Webcast: Listen live; HD2: Listen live
- Website: www.1015vibe.com; HD2: www.97xonline.com

WTBV (101.5 FM, "101.5 The Vibe") is a commercial radio station licensed to St. Petersburg, Florida, and serving the Tampa Bay area. It is owned by the Cox Media Group and broadcasts an urban adult contemporary format. The studios are on 4th Street North in St. Petersburg. WTBV carries the syndicated Rickey Smiley Morning Show in drive time.

WTBV has an effective radiated power (ERP) of 100,000 watts. The transmitter site is on Colonnade Vista Drive in Riverview. WTBV broadcasts using HD Radio technology. The HD2 digital subchannel carries an alternative rock format, known as 97X.

== History ==
=== Religious (1961–1997) ===
The station signed on the air on July 1, 1961. Its original call sign was WGNB. It was the sister station to WGNP 1520 AM (now WXYB). The stations were owned by the World Christian Radio Foundation.

In 1974, the FM station was acquired by the Chicago-based Moody Bible Institute. It became WKES, airing a new Christian radio format from studios at the Moody-affiliated Keswick Christian School in Seminole.

=== Love Songs (1997–1998) ===
In 1997, in a three way swap, Paxson Broadcasting acquired Christian station WCIE 91.1 in Lakeland from the Carpenter's Home Church, which in turn swapped the station with Moody's WKES. WKES programming moved to 91.1 FM.

After a brief simulcast period, the WKES call sign moved to 91.1, while 101.5 became WILV. It began broadcasting a "Love Songs" soft adult contemporary format branded as "Love 101.5", on July 25 of that year.

=== Jammin Oldies (1998–2001) ===
WILV was not successful. In 1998, Paxson Communications' radio stations were bought out by Clear Channel Communications. With Clear Channel taking control, on September 19, 1998, the format changed to rhythmic oldies. The new call sign was WFJO, "Jo 101.5". In 1999, Cox Radio purchased WFJO along with several other Clear Channel stations.

=== 80s Hits (2001–2011) ===
On December 15, 2001, the station flipped to an all '80s format, branded as "The New 101-5 The Point". The first song as "The Point" was "Don't You (Forget About Me)" by Simple Minds. The station was modeled after KHPT in Houston that had launched the previous year. The call sign became WPOI on January 14, 2002, with the station known as "The Point." The original slogan was "The Best of the '80s and More", which included some late-1970s and early-1990s tracks, along with 1980s songs.

In 2006, "The Point" started adding more 1990s songs to the playlist. In 2009, the station added songs as late as 2000. "The Point" also removed all pre-1980s music from the station. In September 2010, the station adopted "The Best Music of the '80s and '90s" slogan.

In May 2011, the "New" was finally dropped from the station's name. Around the same time, the "New" was also dropped from the name of sister stations WWRM and WXGL.

Logo used until November 2018

=== Top 40 (2011–2023) ===
On July 1, 2011, at 10 a.m., after playing Jon Bon Jovi's "Blaze of Glory", WPOI began stunting with random song clips. One hour later, the station flipped to contemporary hit radio as "Hot 101-5". The first (and ultimately, last) song as "Hot" was LMFAO's "Party Rock Anthem" featuring Lauren Bennett and GoonRock.

The station took direct aim at WFLZ, and targeted an 18–49 year old audience (particularly, the 18–34 age bracket). It aired a music-intensive current-based playlist that bordered towards dance-pop tracks, with less talk and commercials than its competitors. By the end of the format's run, the station would also augment the pop music with more classic pop hits from the 1990s onwards, mirroring a recent trend with other Top 40 stations nationwide.

=== Adult R&B (2023-) ===
At noon on September 6, 2023, after playing "Bye Bye Bye" by NSYNC and "Party Rock Anthem" (a bookend to the 'Hot' branding's launch), WPOI began stunting with a loop of "Just Fine" by Mary J. Blige, promoting a change to come at noon the following day.

At the promised time, following a single playing of the "Treat 'em Right" remix of "Just Fine" by Blige, Lil Wayne and Swizz Beatz, WPOI flipped to urban adult contemporary as "101.5 The Vibe." The first song on "The Vibe" was "Return of the Mack" by Mark Morrison. Concurrent with the change, Cox applied for a new WTBV call sign for the station, which took effect on September 11.
