= Opie with Jim Norton =

American radio show

- Genre: Talk
- Running time: 7:00 a.m. to 11:00 a.m., Monday through Thursday
- Country of origin: United States
- Starring: Gregg Hughes; Jim Norton
- Original release: July 14, 2014 – September 22, 2016
- Website: SiriusXM.com

Opie with Jim Norton was an American radio show hosted by Gregg "Opie" Hughes and Jim Norton that aired from July 2014 to September 2016. The show was broadcast from New York City and aired weekdays from 7:00 a.m. through 11:00 a.m. on SiriusXM, the subscription-based satellite radio service, airing on Opie Radio, which could be found on XM Channel 103 and Sirius channel 206. The show was also made available on-demand through the SiriusXM app and Audible.com.

== History ==
On July 3, 2014, radio personality Anthony Cumia, and one half of the Opie and Anthony show on The Opie and Anthony Channel on SiriusXM, was fired after he posted a series of tweets following an alleged off-air incident with an African American woman on the street. Cumia claimed he was punched by the woman while attempting to take a picture in Times Square. SiriusXM issued a statement regarding the incident, saying Cumia's tweets were "racially-charged and hate-filled." Cumia refused to apologize for his actions, although he deleted the tweets after being fired.

After Cumia's firing, his radio partner, Gregg "Opie" Hughes, remained at SiriusXM to continue broadcasting with Opie and Anthony third mic, comedian Jim Norton. Cumia gave his blessing as the two were required to fulfill their contracts. Opie and Anthony was replaced by Opie with Jim Norton, which launched on July 14, 2014. The channel was renamed to SiriusXM Talk. In October 2014, Hughes and Norton signed a new contract with SiriusXM to continue the show, and the channel was renamed once more to Opie Radio.

The final broadcast of Opie with Jim Norton aired on September 22, 2016 to some question as to whether Hughes left on his own volition in order to work afternoons or was forced out of the morning slot as his and Norton's contracts were up for renegotiation. Among growing differences and tension between the two, Hughes moved to afternoons to host The Opie Radio Show, and Norton launched a new morning show, Jim Norton & Sam Roberts, co-hosted with former Opie and Anthony intern and producer Sam Roberts.
