= Sam Roberts (radio personality) =

American radio personality (born 1983)

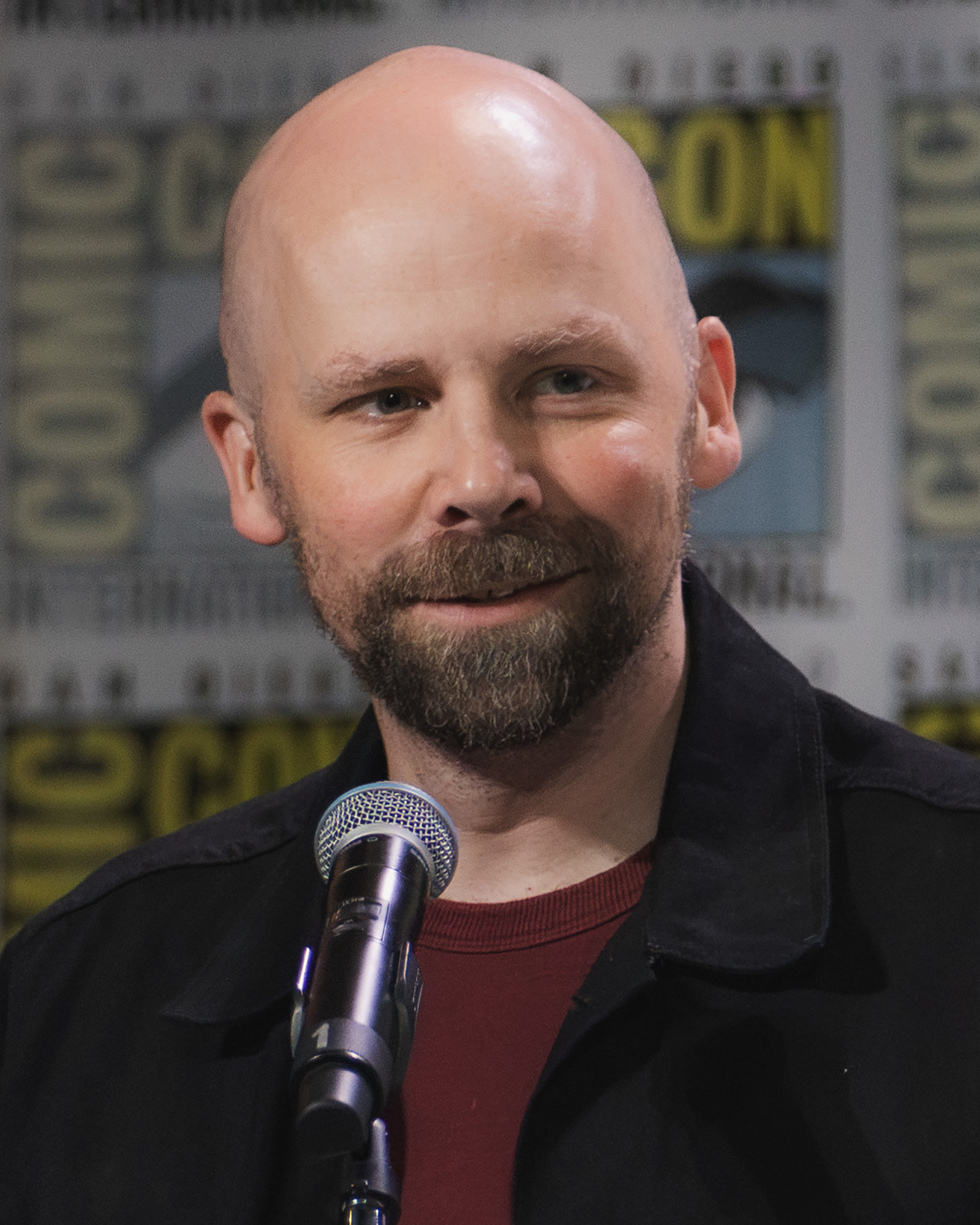
- Roberts in 2026
- Born: Samuel Wood Roberts; September 6, 1983 (age 43)
- Education: Syracuse University
- Notable work: Notsam Wrestling; Jim Norton & Sam Roberts
- Children: 3

Comedy career
- Years active: 2005–present
- Medium: Radio host; television
- Website: notsam.com

Samuel Wood Roberts (born September 6, 1983) is an American professional wrestling personality, radio host, and podcaster. From October 2016 through December 2024, he was the co-host of Jim Norton & Sam Roberts on SiriusXM Satellite Radio. Roberts was an intern and producer of the Opie and Anthony radio show from 2005 until the show's end in 2014. He is the host of the Notsam Wrestling podcast and the co-host of the Satisfying podcast with Nicole Ryan.

== Personal life ==
Sam Roberts attended Syracuse University from 2002 to 2006.

In February 2017 Roberts' wife gave birth to their son named after Sam’s uncle. On the March 27, 2019 episode of Jim Norton & Sam Roberts, Roberts announced they were expecting a girl, who was born on May 16, 2019. On November 23, 2023, Roberts announced on his social media that his wife was pregnant with their third child.

== Professional career ==
=== Radio career ===
Roberts began his radio career in 2002 at WERW in Syracuse, NY. On June 13, 2005, he became an intern on the Opie and Anthony radio show on XM Satellite Radio, based in New York City. In 2006, he became the show's associate producer, followed by producer in January 2010. In April 2011, Roberts became the host of the pre and post Opie and Anthony radio show, and became the show's executive producer in February 2014. On July 3, 2014, the show, then broadcasting on SiriusXM satellite radio, ended after show co-host Anthony Cumia was fired for posting a series of "racially charged" tweets following an alleged off-air incident with a black woman on the street. Hughes and Norton then became hosts of Opie with Jim Norton, which aired until September 2016. From June 2015 to October 2016, Roberts hosted Sam Roberts' Show.

In October 2016, growing differences between Hughes and Norton led to Norton's departure from the show and teaming with Roberts for Jim Norton & Sam Roberts as the new morning show. In October 2018, Norton and Roberts renewed their contracts to continue the show for another three years. Beginning October 15, 2018, the show's start time moved from 8:00 a.m. to 7:00 a.m and ran for four hours. In 2021, the start time moved back to 8:00 in the morning. They signed extensions on their contracts to last through December 2021. They then re-signed through 2024. In January 2025, Norton revealed that he and SiriusXM had parted ways after failing to come to terms on a contract renewal, ending the Jim Norton & Sam Roberts show after eight years.

=== Professional wrestling ===
Roberts began a professional wrestling podcast named Sam Roberts' Wrestling Podcast, in October 2014. In 2018, the podcast was renamed to Notsam Wrestling.

In August 2015 Roberts did a live edition of the Sam Roberts Show from Carolines on Broadway, prior to SummerSlam. The show was broadcast live on Sirius XM and included guests Brock Lesnar, Paul Heyman, and Corey Graves. The following year, Roberts again did a live show from Caroline's the week prior to SummerSlam, with Kevin Owens as his guest. Prior to SummerSlam 2017, Roberts once again broadcast live from Caroline's, with the moniker SummerSam III, with Mark Henry as his guest.

In September 2016, Roberts was featured over a two-part episode of Vince Russo's podcast, The Swerve.

Roberts first appeared on WWE's pay-per-view pre-show panel at December 2016's Roadblock: End of the Line. He has since been part of the pre-show panel and other pre-show responsibilities for various WWE network events.

In December 2017 following Clash of Champions, Roberts made his debut as a host of WWE Talking Smack. Roberts later hosted the final Talking Smack following Fastlane in March 2018.

In January 2018, Roberts hosted the Raw 25 kickoff show. During the April 15 taping of WWE Main Event, Roberts made his debut as a commentator. He has infrequently been a commentator on Main Event since then. On April 1, 2020, Roberts made his guest commentator debut during NXT alongside Tom Phillips. In October 2020, NotSam Wrestling on the WWE Network debuted its first season. From 2023 to May 2024, Sam hosted WWE's The Bump alongside Megan Morant. The two continue to host RawTalk immediately following broadcasts of Monday Night Raw.

=== Other ventures ===
In 2006 Roberts did voiceover work as a radio DJ in Grand Theft Auto: Vice City Stories. Roberts made a cameo appearance in the 2014 film Top Five. In addition, Roberts made regular appearances on Red Eye between 2015-2017. In 2016, Roberts was featured on episode 37 of The Tomorrow Show with Keven Undergaro. In 2019, he and Jim Norton appeared as recon spies on an episode of Bar Rescue.
