= Unmasked (radio show) =

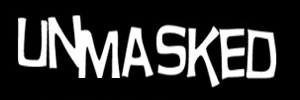
- The Unmasked Logo
- Genre: Talk, Comedy
- Running time: Approximately 1 hour
- Country of origin: United States
- Home station: Sirius XM Faction Talk 103
- Starring: Ron Bennington
- Created by: Ron Bennington; Eric Logan
- Original release: March 2007 – present
- No. of episodes: 130 (As of May 2015)
- Website: Unmasked Website

Unmasked is an American radio show hosted by Ron Bennington that features one on one interviews with comedians, and established and emerging comedic talents.

== Format ==
Unmasked is an hour-long in-depth interview, focused on the creative process and the lives and work of show's guests.

Unmasked's past guests have included Louis CK, Norm Macdonald, Jimmy Fallon, Dick Cavett, Bob Newhart, David Cross, Colin Quinn, Jim Norton, Patrice O'Neal, Bonnie McFarlane, Richard Lewis, Reggie Watts, Eugene Levy, Ali Wong, Russell Brand, Maria Bamford, Patton Oswalt, Otto Petersen, Nick Di Paolo, Tim Heidecker, Eric Wareheim, Aziz Ansari, Bill Burr, Joan Rivers, Judah Friedlander, Brian Regan, Bobcat Goldthwait, and Amy Schumer.

== Recording and airing ==
The show is taped and filmed in front of an audience, usually at the SiriusXM studios in New York City. One episode featuring Opie and Anthony was recorded at Carolines on Broadway. Other episodes have been recorded at The Stand, and Gotham Comedy Club. Studio audience members are picked to attend tapings via a lottery system.

The program airs on Faction Talk Uncensored, SiriusXM channel 103.
