= Ozzy's Boneyard =

Sirius XM satellite radio channel

- Broadcast area: United States; Canada
- Frequencies: Sirius XM Radio 38; Dish Network 6019
- Branding: Ozzy's Boneyard (SiriusXM era); xL Boneyard (XM era)

Programming
- Format: Mainstream Rock (showcasing Classic Hard rock and heavy metal)

Ownership
- Owner: Sirius XM Radio

History
- First air date: 2001; January 15, 2009 (relaunch)

Technical information
- Class: Satellite Radio Station

Links
- Website: SiriusXM: Boneyard

Ozzy's Boneyard, formerly The Boneyard, is a radio station featuring a classic rock/hard rock format on Sirius XM Radio channel 38 and Dish Network 6019.

== History ==
The station was the home of The Rock of Jericho, hosted by WWE wrestler Chris Jericho, until its cancellation in December 2006. The Rock of Jericho episodes continue to be re-run on sister channel Octane. Eddie Trunk started hosting a four-hour show on The Boneyard in December 2006.

In February 2012, Sirius/XM partnered with Sharon Osbourne to relaunch The Boneyard, rebranding it Ozzy's Boneyard. Trunk was dropped as host; he said Osbourne had some unspecified but long-running disagreement with him. Osbourne never allowed her husband Ozzy Osbourne to appear on That Metal Show or to be interviewed by Trunk.
