= Ron Bennington =

American comedian and radio personality

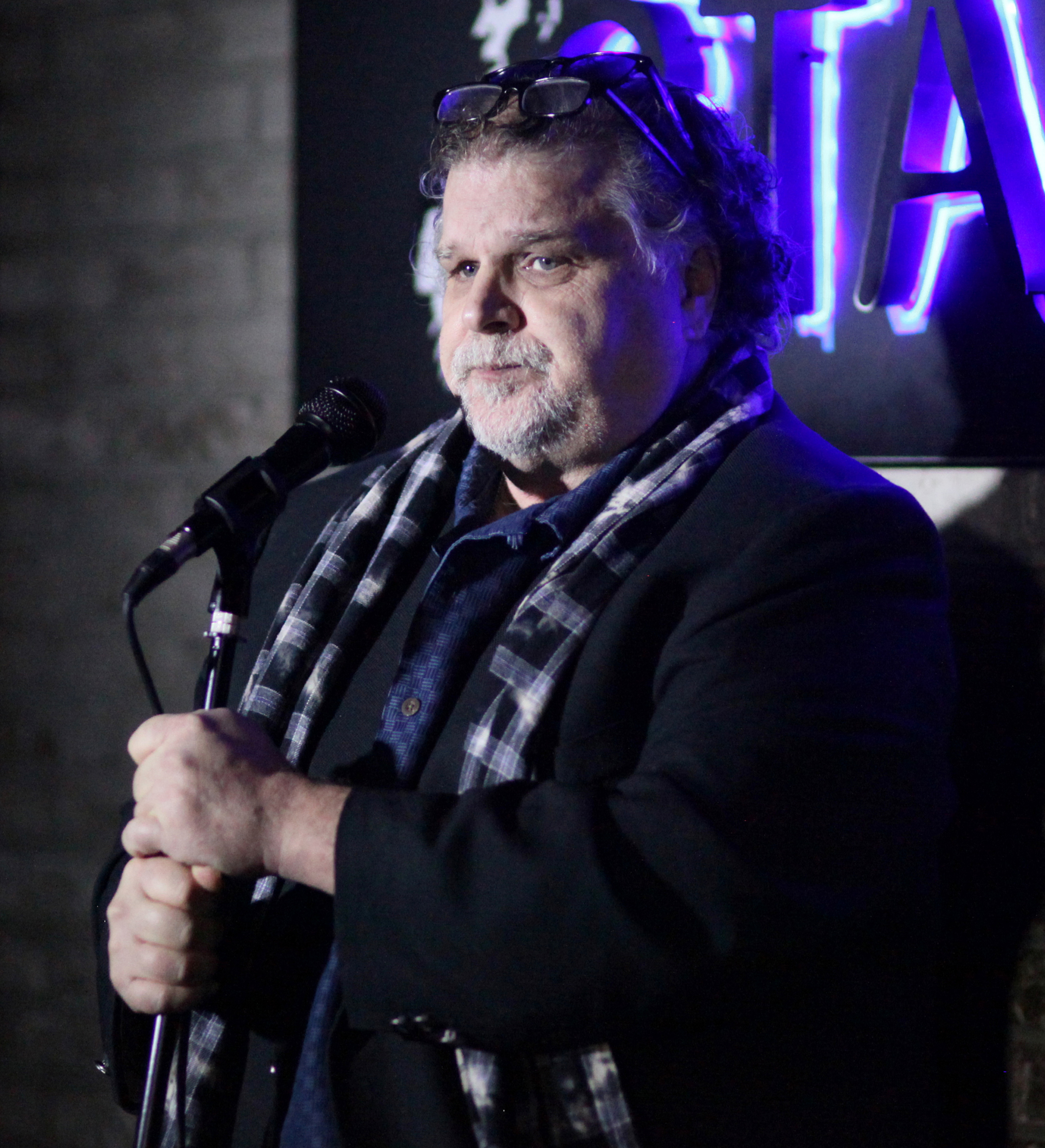
- Bennington performing in December 2016
- Born: December 31, 1958 (age 67); Philadelphia, Pennsylvania, U.S.
- Presenting career
- Show: Bennington
- Station: Faction Talk on (Sirius XM channel 103)
- Time slot: 12:00pm – 3:00 pm ET; Monday - Friday
- Show: Unmasked
- Station: Sirius XM On Demand
- Style: Host
- Website: Ron Bennington Interviews

Ronald Lee Bennington (born December 31, 1958) is an American radio personality and comedian. He is currently the co-host of the talk radio show Bennington and host of Unmasked. Additionally, Bennington has been a co-host of a number of radio shows, including The Ron and Ron Show and The Ron and Fez Show with Fez Whatley.

== Radio career ==
=== Ron and Ron (1987–1997) ===
In 1986, Bennington opened Ron Bennington's Comedy Scene in Clearwater, Florida. He met Ron Diaz, on whose radio show he plugged his club, and quickly the two created the morning radio program The Ron and Ron Show at Tampa Bay's WYNF-FM, known as 95YNF. The show had huge ratings success and Ron & Ron known as "Radio's Bad Boys" then partnered with their agent Ross Reback to form The Ron & Ron Radio Network to own and syndicate the programming. The show's final broadcast for WYNF was on March 12, 1993. Reback became President and CEO of the newly formed network and quickly negotiated a deal to broadcast the show in Miami, Orlando, and Jacksonville, with another dozen markets soon following (including a new more lucrative deal in Tampa). Ron Diaz announced his departure in early 1997 and on September 29, 1997 the show ended.

=== Ron and Fez (1997–2015) ===
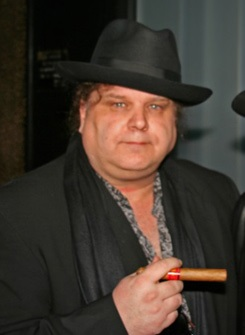
Bennington in 2007

After The Ron & Ron Show ended Bennington teamed up with Fez Whatley, the former show's producer, to launch The Ron and Fez Show. After stints in Daytona Beach, New York City, and Washington, D.C., the show was broadcast from New York City (originally briefly called "Ron and Fez dot com" as it was devoted to discussing Web sites) on 102.7 FM WNEW-FM from 2000–2003, and syndicated to additional FM stations toward the end of the run, until the station ended the talk format, and eventually moved to 106.7 FM WJFK-FM near Washington D.C. where it aired live from 2003–2005, a station that had been simulcasting the WNEW-based show since 2000. Bennington and Whatley moved back to New York and debuted on XM Satellite Radio on September 12, 2005.

On April 1, 2015, Fez announced his retirement, with their final show being April 3.

=== Bennington (2014–Present) ===
In October 2014, he began co-hosting Bennington with his daughter Gail. The show initially aired on Opie Radio Friday 7–10:00 am time slot when Opie and Norton were off.

In April 2015, following the retirement of Fez Whatley, Bennington began airing five days a week, in Ron and Fez's noon–3:00pm time slot (as of April 2023, 12-2pm), in addition to their Friday spot on Opie Radio.

=== Other radio ventures ===
Ron Bennington Interviews is a weekend program on XM which replays different interviews every week which Ron conducts. The show runs on Sirius XM Indie.

In 2007, Bennington began Unmasked, a solo venture which has one-on-one interviews with comedy legends and established and emerging comedic talents.

On September 15, 2026, after being diagnosed with stage four colon cancer, Ron started a podcast called Portcast, where he interviews famous comedians while he is receiving chemotherapy for a trial drug in his chemotherapy suite. The first episode featured fellow comedian Shane Gillis.

== The Disciples of Comedy ==
In the mid-1990s, Bennington formed a comedy troupe to tour to the markets where The Ron & Ron Show was syndicated. Ron Bennington's Disciples of Comedy included several comedians who had previously toured as part of Sam Kinison's Outlaws of Comedy. Among the members were Bennington, Carl LaBove, Jimmy Shubert, Mitchell Walters, Dan Carlson, Lou Angelwolf, Jeff Apploff, Ralph Williams, and Curtain Boy Warren Durso. The shows also included Fez Whatley and Fast Eddie Yarb. The tour was produced by Jeff Apploff, Ross Reback and The Ron & Ron Radio Network. The comedy tour sold out theatres of 2,000 to 3,000 seats.

With Ross Reback he co-owned Ron Bennington's Comedy Scene, a comedy club in Clearwater. One of the comics he says "earned his chops" there is Jim Breuer.

== Appearances ==
Bennington regularly engages in the use of cigars and has been interviewed in Cigar Magazine.

Bennington has a cupcake named for him at Molly's Cupcakes locations. It is a chocolate cupcake made with a combination of peanut butter filling, chocolate ganache, and crushed butterscotch topping. In 2008 it was the best-selling cupcake at Molly's.

In 2015, it was revealed on the Bennington Show that an American racing greyhound had been named after Bennington and registered as "Ron Bennington". Owned by Melissa Skrivseth-Schmidt and Christopher Straka, "Ron Bennington" began her racing career at the Iowa Greyhound Park and raced her first official race at Daytona Beach Kennel Club and Poker Room.

== Personal life ==
Bennington began abstaining from alcohol and drugs after periods of addiction.

In March 2026, after missing one day of his SiriusXM show, Bennington was diagnosed with stage four colon cancer that was found to have spread to other parts of his abdomen.
