= The Ron and Ron Show =

The Ron & Ron Show
- Genre: Talk show
- Running time: 4 hours 6am-10am
- Country of origin: United States
- Language: American English
- Home station: Nationally Syndicated
- Starring: Ron Diaz and Ron Bennington
- Recording studio: Florida
- Original release: 1987 – 1997

The Ron & Ron Show was an American radio talk show nationally syndicated and hosted by Ron Diaz and Ron Bennington.

== History ==
In 1987, stand-up comedian Ron Bennington joined radio veteran Ron Diaz to create the radio program, The Ron & Ron Show, at Tampa Bay's WYNF-FM, known as 95YNF. The show had huge ratings success, and Ron & Ron, known as "Radio's Bad Boys," then partnered with their agent Ross Reback to form The Ron & Ron Radio Network to own and syndicate the programming. The show's final broadcast for WYNF was on March 12, 1993. Reback became President and CEO of the newly formed network and quickly negotiated a deal to broadcast the show in Miami, FL, Orlando, FL, and Jacksonville, FL, with another dozen markets soon following (including a new lucrative deal in Tampa, FL).

The Ron & Ron Show made national headlines after engaging in a screaming match with apparently inebriated actor Don Johnson (Miami Vice, Nash Bridges, Blood & Oil). The Ron & Ron Show made international headlines once again when cast regular "Flipper" formed a rock band to play at the upcoming Ron & Ron Live Gig in Miami, Florida and named his band The Dead German Tourists after two German tourists who had recently been murdered upon leaving the Miami International Airport in a rental car. The band's name caused an uproar, and Miami city officials held an emergency meeting and voted to prohibit The Ron & Ron Show from holding their Live Gig within Miami city limits. The Ron & Ron Radio Network considered the city council's vote a form of censorship, and undeterred, Reback moved the Live Gig to neighboring Hallandale, FL, at the last minute. An estimated crowd of approximately 10,000 fans attended the show.

On December 21, 1994, Ron Diaz announced that his wife Debbie was diagnosed with AIDS and Diaz began periodically missing broadcasts to care for her. Debbie Diaz died on November 13, 1995.

Ross Reback successfully negotiated a divestiture of The Ron & Ron Radio Network through a sale to Paxson Communications Corp. Ron Diaz announced his departure on-air from The Ron & Ron Show in early 1997 as Paxson prepared to relocate it from the network's studios in St. Petersburg, FL, to one in Hollywood, FL. Without Diaz and under Paxson, the show soon floundered, and on September 29, 1997, after a successful 11-year run (the last few months of which featured several replacement hosts, all of whom took the name "Ron" in a failed attempt at a replacement of Diaz), the show was cancelled. Clear Channel Radio purchased the radio division of rightsholder, Paxson Communications, and opted not to continue the show.

== Other ventures ==
The Ron & Ron Radio Network produced two full-length feature videos—Ron & Ron: Let The Puppies Breathe, and Ron & Ron's Pup Friction, which contained video highlights from the radio show and the Live Gigs, along with specially produced material. Both videos were huge sellers to their loyal listener base, and pre-dated the Girls Gone Wild series and MTV's Jackass. The term "let the puppies breathe" is a reference to the show used to encourage women to expose their breasts; Ross Reback, Ron Diaz and Ron Bennington served as executive producers.

In addition to The Ron & Ron Show, The Ron & Ron Radio Network also owned and produced the Hooters-on-the-Radio Show, which featured former Hooters Girls, including the Original Hooters girl, and 1986 Playboy Playmate, Lynne Austin, and The Gary Spivey Show, featuring the nationally known psychic.

Ross Reback and Ron Bennington jointly owned Ron Bennington's Comedy Scene, a 200-seat premier comedy club in Clearwater, Florida. The club featured nationally known comedians and was a launching pad for comedians such as Jim Breuer, Brian Regan, Billy Gardell, Tom Rhodes, and many others.

Ron Bennington assembled a comedy troupe to tour the markets where The Ron & Ron Show was syndicated. Ron Bennington's Disciples of Comedy included several comedians who had previously toured as part of Sam Kinison's Outlaws of Comedy. The Disciples of Comedy were Ron Bennington, Carl LaBove, Jimmy Shubert, Mitchell Walters, Dan Carlson, Lou Angelwolf, Jeff Apploff, Ralph Williams and Curtain Boy Warren Durso. The shows also included Fez Whatley and Fast Eddie Yarb. Ross Reback and The Ron & Ron Radio Network produced the tour. The comedy tour sold out theatres of 2,000 to 3,000 seats.

== Ron & Ron Live Gigs ==
The Ron and Ron Show famously hosted several live radio broadcasts/comedy shows known as Ron & Ron "Live Gigs" that were rather raucous and adult in nature. The "Live Gigs" were wildly popular, and many would typically attract crowds estimated between 10,000 and 30,000 attendees.
