= XM2go =

XM2go is XM Satellite Radio's line of portable "walkman-like" receivers.

All first generation XM2go models have identical internal components designed by XM Satellite Radio and are manufactured by Flextronics. Each branded manufacturer has a chassis of their own design, along with marketing and distribution rights.

== XM2go models ==
=== 1st Generation Players ===
- The MyFi, from Delphi.
- The AirWare, from Pioneer.
- The Tao, from Giant.

=== 2nd Generation Players ===
- The Inno, from Pioneer.
- The Helix, from Samsung.
- Audiovox plans on releasing a 2nd Generation XM2Go unit in 2007.

=== Unit Specifications ===
All first generation XM2go models have identical internal components manufactured by Giant International for XM. Each is assembled by secondary manufacturers, and housed in chassis of their own design.

Second generation XM2go models add a color screen with mp3 storage capability compatible with Napster using a click-to-buy feature.

=== Technical Information ===
The MyFi series has a "My XM" function that allows for scheduled recording similar to a TiVo manual recording for XM Radio programming. Manufacturers have complied with RIAA demands to not allow transfer of programming from the units to other mediums. Additionally, previously recorded programming is only accessible with a paid subscription to XM radio. Once service is canceled previously recorded music will be unplayable from the unit.

== See also ==
XM Satellite Radio
