= Ron Diaz =

American radio talk-show host

Ron Diaz (born c. 1955) is an American radio talk show host on iHeartMedia, Inc.'s sports radio station WDAE (620 AM and 95.3 FM) in Tampa, Florida as the host of The Ron & Ian Show.

== Radio career ==
=== The Ron & Ron Show ===
In 1987, stand-up comedian Ron Bennington joined radio veteran Ron Diaz to create the popular radio program, The Ron & Ron Show, at Tampa Bay's WYNF-FM, known as 95YNF. The show had huge ratings success and Ron & Ron known as "Radio's Bad Boys" then partnered with their agent Ross Reback to form The Ron & Ron Radio Network to own and syndicate the programming. The show's final broadcast for WYNF was on March 12, 1993. Reback became President and CEO of the newly formed network and quickly negotiated a deal to broadcast the show in Miami, FL, Orlando, FL, and Jacksonville, FL with another dozen markets soon following (including a new more lucrative deal in Tampa, FL).

Ron Diaz announced his departure on-air from The Ron & Ron Show in early 1997, and on September 29, 1997 after a successful 11-year run the show ended.

Ross Reback successfully negotiated a divestiture of The Ron & Ron Radio Network through a sale to Paxson Communications Corp.[8] Ron Diaz announced his departure on-air from The Ron & Ron Show in early 1997[9] as Paxson prepared to relocate it from the network’s studios in St. Petersburg, FL to one in Hollywood, FL. Without Diaz, and under Paxson, the show soon floundered, and on September 29, 1997 after a successful 11-year run (the last few months of which featured several replacement hosts, all of whom took the name "Ron" in a failed attempted replacement of Diaz). Due to low ratings after Diaz's departure, The Ron & Ron Show was promptly canceled when Clear Channel Radio purchased the radio division of rightsholder, Paxson Communications, and opted not to continue the show.

=== Thunder 103.5 ===
Ron Diaz announced his departure from The Ron & Ron Show on-air in 1997. A short time later, Diaz joined Clear Channel Radio's Classic Rock station WTBT-FM (Thunder 103.5) and launched the brand new The Ron Diaz Show, as the station launched its dial position on 103.5.

=== The Ron & Ian Show ===
Ron Diaz was partnered with former Tampa Bay Buccaneers player Ian Beckles for 12 years as the host of The Ron & Ian Show on WDAE (620 AM and 95.3 FM) in Tampa, FL. Beckles' contract was not renewed by the station, and he departed the show in December 2015.

=== The Ron & JP Show ===
Ron Diaz was the host of The Ron & JP Show on WDAE (620 AM and 95.3 FM) in Tampa, FL with JP Peterson. Peterson is the former Sports Director of WFLA-TV Newschannel 8 in Tampa. From 2016 to 2018

=== The Ron & Ian Show returns ===
On November 26, 2018, Ron Diaz and Ian Beckles returned to 620 WDAE after three years' absence. The Ron & Ian Show broadcast on weekday afternoons features light-hearted, sports-related conversation. Producer Jay Recher remains a key part of the program.

=== Ron Diaz Retirement from Radio ===
In December, 2020, Ron Diaz retired from radio from WDAE.

== Personal life ==
On December 21, 1994, Ron Diaz announced that his wife Debbie was diagnosed with AIDS and Diaz began periodically missing broadcasts to care for her. Debbie Diaz died on November 13, 1995.
