= Doggart =

Doggart is a surname. Notable people include:

- Caroline Doggart (born 1939), development economist and author
- Graham Doggart (1897–1963), English administrator, cricketer, footballer and magistrate
- Hubert Doggart (1925–2018), English sports administrator, cricketer and schoolmaster
- James Hamilton Doggart (1900–1989), ophthalmologist
- Nike Doggart, conservationist, environmental activist, and writer
- Peter Doggart (1927–1965), English cricketer
- Sebastian Doggart, English/American television producer
- Simon Doggart (1961–2017), English schoolmaster, and a co-abuser in the Church of England John Smyth sado-masochistic abuse of young men scandal.
