= Doggarts =

Former department store chain

Doggarts was a chain of department stores based in the North East of England, with their head office and main store located in Bishop Auckland.

== History ==
In 1892 Arthur Robert Doggart, from Aldershot, moved to Bishop Auckland to take up a position of Buyer of Hosiery and Fancy goods for a drapery business based in Auckland House, on the corner of Market Place.

By 1895, Doggart had taken over the business and started running the business his own way. He expanded by opening a further store in Shildon, and by setting up the Doggarts Club. This was an interest free way for the poor miner families to buy furnishing and clothing from the store. Arthur Doggart was a committed Baptist, becoming the president of the Baptist Union.

The Business which sold everything but food, grew to serve many of the mining communities in the North East with new stores being opened. In 1933, Doggarts spent £30,000 on building a new store in Gateshead. At one point the business had 17 branches, but all were operated from the main store at Bishop Auckland. The branches were:

- Bishop Auckland
- Ashington
- Billingham
- Chester-le-Street
- Consett
- Crook
- Darlington
- Durham
- Gateshead
- Houghton-le-Spring
- New Shildon
- Peterlee opened 1968
- Seaham Harbour
- Shildon
- Spennymoor
- Stockton on Tees
- West Stanley
- Wingate, County Durham

To assist with the running of the Doggarts Club, two business were set up. Ashton Supply Company and the Economic Clothing Company at one time had 800 staff travelling across County Durham to collect payments from Doggarts customers. The business was known for its Green Vans, Pneumatic Change dispensers and Hand Painted Price tickets.

During the 1970s, the business had its own Rally Car entered into the RAC Rally, driven by Nicky Porter and navigated by John Parker.

However death duties and inflation had hit the business hard, and the business was too small to bulk buy to match the big chains. In November 1980 Jamie Doggart announced the business would close, which at the time still had ten stores, with the loss of 340 jobs. The Bishop Auckland store finally closed its doors on Christmas Eve, 1980.

== The family ==
The Doggart family have been good at sport - Arthur Doggart's sons Graham, James & Norman played cricket for Durham. Graham also played for England in Cricket and Football, and was the Chairman of the FA between 1961-1963.

Arthur's grandsons Peter & Hubert also played cricket, with Hubert playing twice for England in 1950. Arthur's great grandson Simon also played first class cricket.
