= Sebastian Doggart =

British actor

- Education: Eton College, King's College, Cambridge; Royal Central School of Speech and Drama
- Occupations: Television producer, Director, Writer, Journalist, Translator, Cinematographer and Human rights activist

Sebastian Doggart is a British television producer, director, writer, journalist, translator, cinematographer and human rights activist.

== Education ==
Doggart was educated at Montessori-style primary schools, Haverford School, Horris Hill School and Eton College, where he won an Oppidan Scholarship and the Queen's Prize for French. In 1984, he became the last student in Eton's history to receive corporal punishment, a fact confirmed by the school's headmaster.

He attended King's College, Cambridge, where he studied Social and Political Sciences, obtained a first-class degree and an MA, and was elected a Scholar.

== Early writing career ==
Doggart began his career as a journalist in Latin America, working as a reporter on the Lima Times. In 1990, he moved to Argentina, where he became economics editor for the Buenos Aires Herald. Doggart subsequently wrote Investment Opportunities in Argentina, which included a foreword by Carlos Menem.

== Theatre career ==
After leaving Cambridge, Doggart trained as a drama director at Central School of Speech and Drama. His production of Ms Lear, a reinterpretation of King Lear with Lear portrayed as a neo-Thatcherite woman, was performed in London and Amsterdam. After graduating, he worked on productions for Cheek by Jowl, including a world tour of The Duchess of Malfi; Actors Touring Company, with Ion by Euripides; Theatre Museum Covent Garden, with Playing with Fire by August Strindberg; and Creation Theatre Company, where he directed Romeo and Juliet, setting the play in 18th-century Ireland with English Capulets and Irish Montagues.

Doggart has translated and directed a number of Latin American plays for the British stage. His translations were published in the 1996 collection Latin American Plays: New Drama from Argentina, Cuba, Mexico and Peru, which he selected, translated and introduced. His production of Mistress of Desires, on which he collaborated with Mario Vargas Llosa, premiered in 1993. He subsequently worked on the British premiere of Carlos Fuentes' Orchids in the Moonlight. Doggart rehearsed the production in Cuba, where it opened at the Teatro Nacional in Havana, before being performed at the Edinburgh Festival.

In 1994, Doggart translated and directed Night of the Assassins by Cuban author Jose Triana, staging it at the Technis theatre in London and at the Edinburgh Festival. In 1996, he translated and directed a double bill at The Gate theatre consisting of Saying Yes by Griselda Gambaro and Rappaccini's Daughter by Octavio Paz. Sarah Alexander played the role of Beatrice. The translation of Rappaccini's Daughter was subsequently staged elsewhere, including a production by the Santa Fe Playhouse in July 2006. Doggart also translated Diatribe of Love against a sitting man by Gabriel García Márquez and The Kings by Julio Cortázar.

In 1998, Doggart produced Northern Stage's 'Lorca Fiesta', a festival in Newcastle upon Tyne marking the centenary of the birth of Spanish poet Federico García Lorca. The event included an academic conference involving scholars and translators of Lorca and a dramatization of Lorca's Poet in New York, which Doggart adapted and directed. He was also producer and dramaturg for The Moon Comes Out, Federico, a collaboration between Northern Stage and the Seville-based company Octubre Danza. The production combined storytelling, contemporary dance and live cante jondo in an adaptation of Lorca's poem "Lament to Ignacio Sanchez Mejias".

In 2000, Doggart co-founded the Gaia Arts Center in Havana, Cuba, as a venue for theatre practitioners. In 2007, he co-directed the live performance piece Balance of Ice.

Between 2007 and 2008, Doggart translated and directed Cocinando con Elvis, a Spanish-language version of Lee Hall's play Cooking with Elvis, which was staged at the Teatro Nacional in Havana.

== Television career ==
In 1999, Doggart began working in television production. He produced and/or directed programmes for the BBC, including Tomorrow's World, and Channel Four, including Living on the Line. He also worked as an associate producer on the ITV series The South Bank Show and Two Thousand Years. His interview subjects included Germaine Greer, Kenneth Branagh and Octavio Paz.

In 2000, Doggart moved to the United States, where his television work included:

- Wife Swap for ABC and RDF Media.
- Project Runway for Bravo, for which Doggart was a producer and was nominated for a 2005 Primetime Emmy for Outstanding Reality-Competition Program.
- 15 Films About Madonna for A&E, a one-hour production consisting of 15 short films in different genres, which Doggart directed and co-wrote. The production was selected for the 2008 Muestra de Jovenes Realizadores in Havana, Cuba.
- Two series of Damage Control (TV series) for MTV.
- 30 Days for FX, hosted by Morgan Spurlock.
- Things I Hate About You for Bravo.
- American Candidate for Showtime Network.
- Hollywood Vice, a documentary series set in Los Angeles.
- Raid Gauloises for Channel 4/TF1, covering an adventure race in Vietnam.
- History of Movie Genres for Film4/Bravo.

== Film career ==
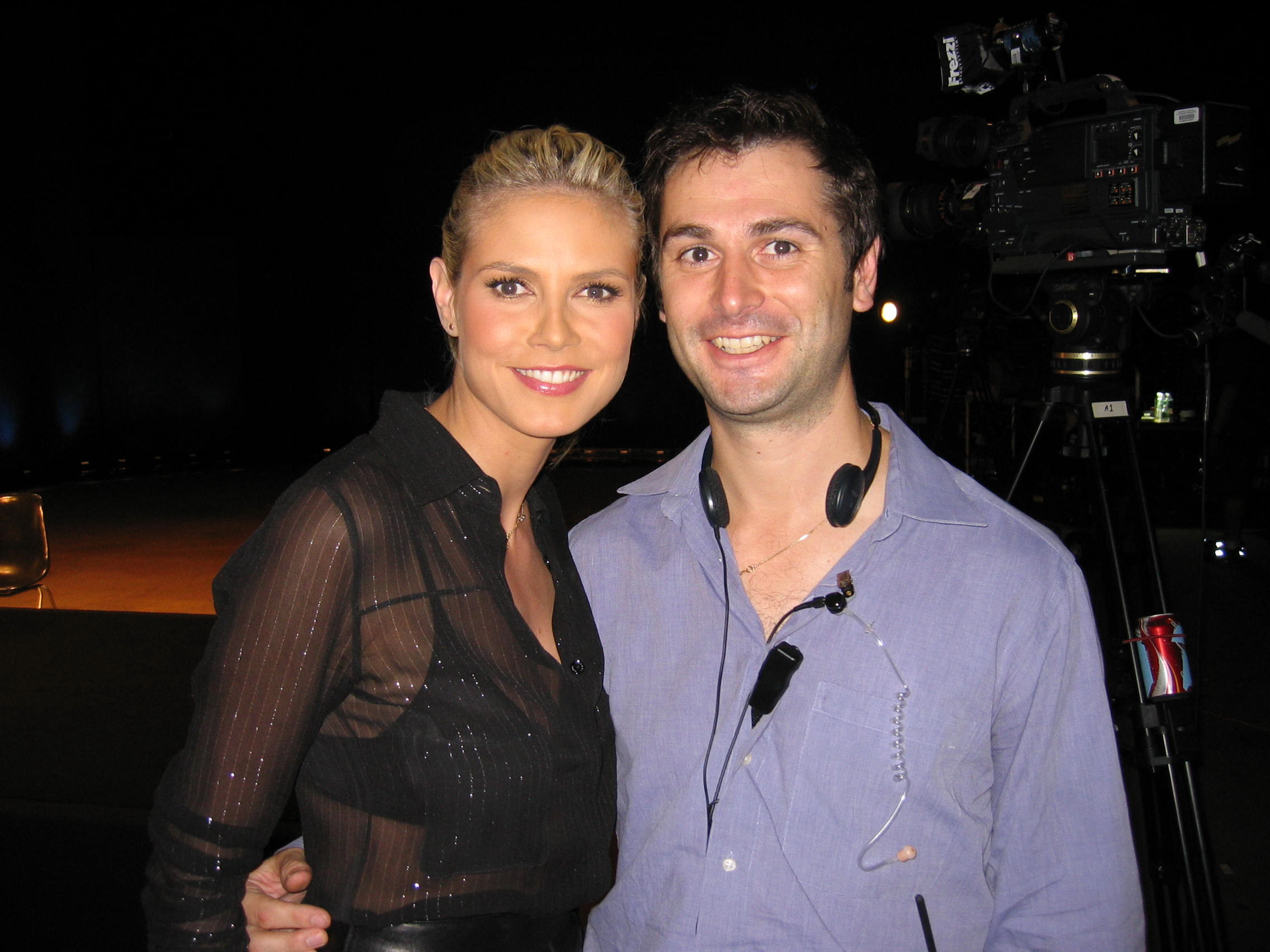
Sebastian Doggart and Heidi Klum on set of Project Runway

Sebastian Doggart at 2005 Emmys

Doggart directing 15 Films About Madonna

After writing and directing two short fiction films, Hole in the Wall and Three and a Bed, Doggart established Tribute Films, a company that produced films for individuals and their pets. One of its productions was Carol Connors and Her Cats, about songwriter Carol Connors and her cats.

In 2004, Doggart moved to New York City. He subsequently wrote and directed Courting Condi, a film about Condoleezza Rice that combines documentary and fictional elements.

Doggart later directed and wrote American Faust: From Condi to Neo-Condi, a documentary examining Rice's political career and her role in the administration of George W. Bush. The film received recognition at several film festivals, including the Mexico International Film Festival, Marbella International Film Festival and Treasure Coast International Film Festival.

Doggart also directed True Bromance, a comedy featuring Jim Norton, Adrian Grenier, Frank Luntz and Devin Ratray. The film received the Best Film award at the 2012 Harlem International Film Festival.

== Political and human rights career ==
In 1997, Doggart worked as a campaign manager on Martin Bell's successful campaign for the parliamentary constituency of Tatton.

In 2009 and 2010, Doggart used screenings of his documentary American Faust: From Condi to Neo-Condi in connection with campaigns concerning the treatment of detainees and the use of torture during the administration of George W. Bush.

The campaign included screenings and public discussions of the film. At the University of Denver, Doggart organized a debate on whether Rice should face prosecution for alleged war crimes; participants included political theorist Alan Gilbert and Republican state senator Sean Mitchell. Doggart also participated in protests associated with Rice's public appearances, including opposition to her scheduled 2010 performance with Aretha Franklin and the Philadelphia Orchestra.

In 2014, Doggart served on the jury of the Tackling Torture Video Contest, which focused on short films addressing torture and accountability. He also served on the jury for the contest's second edition in 2015.

By 2018, Doggart was serving as president of the New York Families Civil Liberties Union. He subsequently became executive director of the national Families Civil Liberties Union.

== Writing career ==
Doggart co-edited Fire, Blood and the Alphabet: One Hundred Years of Lorca, a collection about Spanish poet and playwright Federico García Lorca. The book includes an essay and translations by Doggart, alongside contributions from scholars, writers and translators. A later edition was published by Manchester University Press in 2009.

In 1996, Doggart selected, translated and introduced Latin American Plays: New Drama from Argentina, Cuba, Mexico and Peru, published by Nick Hern Books. The collection contains translations of five plays by Octavio Paz, José Triana, Griselda Gambaro, Carlos Fuentes and Mario Vargas Llosa, together with interviews with the playwrights and an introductory history of Latin American drama.

Doggart also wrote Investment Opportunities in Argentina, published by the Southern Development Trust in 1991.

His journalism has appeared in publications including The Guardian, The Observer, and The Daily Telegraph.

Doggart has also written film criticism for The Guardian, including coverage of the Sundance Film Festival.

== Family ==
Doggart is the grandson of ophthalmologist and writer James Hamilton Doggart; the son of author and development economist Caroline Doggart and financier Anthony Doggart; and the brother of conservationist Nike Doggart.

== Publications ==
- Fire, Blood and the Alphabet: One Hundred Years of Lorca, with Michael Thompson, University of Durham, 1999, ISBN 0907310443; later edition, Manchester University Press, 2009
- Latin American Plays: New Drama from Argentina, Cuba, Mexico and Peru, selected, translated and introduced by Doggart, Nick Hern Books, 1996, ISBN 978-1854592491
- Time Out: Havana, contributor, 2001, ISBN 0141000295
- Time Out: Havana, contributor, 2005, ISBN 1904978835
- Time Out: Havana, contributor, 2007, ISBN 978-1846700149
- Stages of Conflict: A Critical Anthology of Latin American Theater and Performance, contributor, University of Michigan Press, 2008, ISBN 978-0472050277
- Investment Opportunities in Argentina, Southern Development Trust, 1991, ISBN 0951714406
- Cary Grant: A Class Apart, by Graham McCann, Columbia University Press, 1998, ISBN 0231108850
- Raymond Chandler: A Biography, by Tom Hiney, Grove Press, 1999, ISBN 978-0802136374
- Purple Homicide: Fear and Loathing on Knutsford Heath, by John Sweeney, Bloomsbury Press, 1998, ISBN 978-0747539704

== Reviews of work ==
- "Catwalks and Catfights", by Sean Smith, Newsweek, 28 February 2005, p. 61
- "Hemlines on the Stand", by Alessandra Stanley, The New York Times, 16 February 2005
- "Opportunities in Argentina Challenges a Few Investors", International Herald Tribune, 23–24 March 1991
- "Argentinian Investment, Anyone?", ABA Banking Journal, June 1991, p. 9
- "Argentina's Great Investment Potential", The Independent, 27 April 1991, p. 22
- "Review: Fire, Blood and the Alphabet", Forum for Modern Language Studies, vol. 37, no. 3, 2001, p. 340
- "Reviews", by Sarah Leggott, A.U.M.L.A., May 2001
- "Few Takers for Lone Venture", The Daily Telegraph, 20 March 1991
- "Investing in the Gaucho Club", by David Lehmann, Professional Investor, 1991
- "Argentina Steps Towards Stability", by Martin Barrow, The Times, 18 March 1991
- "Argentina: Petrochemical Paradise?", Chemistry and Industry, no. 10, 20 May 1991
- "Night of the Assassins", by Thea Jourdan, The Scotsman, 29 August 1994
- "Orchids in the Moonlight", Scotland on Sunday, 23 August 1992
- "Love, Fidelity and Cats", by James Verini, Los Angeles Times, 28 November 2002
- "Two Thousand Years", Financial Times, 28 April 1999, p. 22
- "Time to Forget Those Old TV Acquaintances", by Paul Hoggart, The Times, 31 December 1999
- "30 Days", The Hollywood Reporter, 15 June 2006
