= Total immersion =

Total immersion may refer to:

== Education ==
- Total immersion, a type of language immersion in bilingual education

== Companies ==
- Total Immersion (augmented reality), Augmented reality software solutions with D'Fusion
- Total Immersion Swimming, a swimming technique founded by Terry Laughlin

== Other uses ==
- Total Immersion Racing, a 2002 racing video game

== See also ==
- Immersion (disambiguation)
