= Simon Doggart =

English headmaster (1961 – 2017)

Simon Jonathon Graham Doggart (8 February 1961 – 23 July 2017) was an English headmaster and cricketer.

== Biography ==
Born in Winchester, Hampshire, Doggart was educated at Winchester College (1974–79) and Magdalene College, Cambridge. He was in the school cricket first XI for three years, and the captain in his last, also playing for the school racquets first pair.

He represented Cambridge University as a left-handed batsman in 35 first-class matches between 1980 and 1983. He was awarded four blues. His grandfather Graham Doggart, great-uncle James Hamilton Doggart, father Hubert Doggart and uncle Peter Doggart all played first-class cricket.

After leaving Cambridge he taught in Kenya (1983–85) and at Tonbridge School (1985–89). Following a short spell working in recruitment (1989–92), he returned to teaching, this time at Eton College in the History department.

== The Makin Review and abuse of young men ==
In February 2017, it was revealed that a former mentor of his, John Smyth, had sadistically violently beaten public school pupils in the 1970s and 1980s. Doggart announced in February 2017 that he intended, at the age of 56, to resign as headmaster of Caldicott School in July 2017. In April 2017, it was alleged that Doggart had been a victim of Smyth's abusive beatings as a young man; and that he later administered severe beatings alongside Smyth. In May 2017, the school announced that Doggart was to be replaced as headmaster by Theroshene Naidoo, due to ill health.

Doggart died of renal cell carcinoma on 23 July 2017 in East Wittering, Chichester, England.
