= José Triana =

José Triana may refer to:

- José Triana (athlete) (born 1935), Cuban sprinter
- José Triana (poet) (1931–2018), Cuban poet and playwright
- José Jerónimo Triana (1828–1890), Colombian botanist, explorer, and physician
