= Sunday Stew =

Sunday Stew was a block of programming aired on Sunday nights between 9-11 p.m. where MTV showed new episodes of their comedic programs targeted towards younger college-aged men. Like MTV2, the Stew showed short films before and after a show. The branding was discontinued on television in December 2005.

== Sunday Stew line-ups ==
The following are the shows aired during the Sunday Stew for the time periods listed. Each lineup was referred to as a "season" by MTV; thus, the Sunday Stew aired six "seasons" between 2003 and 2005.

Sunday Stew (October 2003 - December 2005)
| Year | 9:00 PM | 9:30 PM | 10:00 PM | 10:30 PM |
|---|---|---|---|---|
| October – December 2003 | Punk'd | Viva La Bam | Wildboyz | One Bad Trip |
| April 2004 – June 2004 | Viva La Bam | Pimp My Ride | Punk'd | Wildboyz |
| October 2004 – December 2004 | Pimp My Ride | You've Got a Friend | Viva La Bam | One Bad Trip |
| March 2005 – April 2005 | Pimp My Ride | Damage Control | Punk'd | Viva La Bam |
| June 2005 – August 2005 | Pimp My Ride | Viva La Bam | Punk'd | The Andy Milonakis Show |
| October 2005 – December 2005 | Beavis And Butthead | The Andy Milonakis Show | Punk'd | Homewrecker |

== Ten-minute sneak peeks ==
Occasionally, MTV would air the first 10 minutes of a new movie at the conclusion of the programming block. Movies previewed included Dodgeball: A True Underdog Story and The Chronicles of Riddick.
