= Families Civil Liberties Union =

American non-profit organization

- Formation: 2012
- Founder: Gregory Roberts
- Type: 501(c)(4) non-profit corporation
- Purpose: Civil liberties advocacy
- Region served: United States, Canada
- Key people: Sebastian Doggart (Executive Director)
- Website: www.fclu.org

The Families Civil Liberties Union (FCLU) is an American non-profit professional activist organization. The FCLU fights for fairness in the family court system, and seeks to expose corruption and misconduct by family court judges, attorneys, and psychologists.

== History ==
The Families Civil Liberties Union was founded in 2012 by Gregory Roberts, in direct response to the US Family Court's lack of protection and support for the fathers and mothers of divorcing families and the children who become harmed by protracted, expensive and emotionally damaging custody battles.

In 2019, the FCLU produced a widely viewed short film, Portrait of a Family Court Calamity, which exposed misconduct by judges and attorneys in New York City.

== See also ==
- American Civil Liberties Union (ACLU)
- Family court
- American Civil Rights Union
- New York Civil Liberties Union
