= Jim Norton (comedian) =

American comedian, radio personality, actor, author, and podcast host (born 1968)

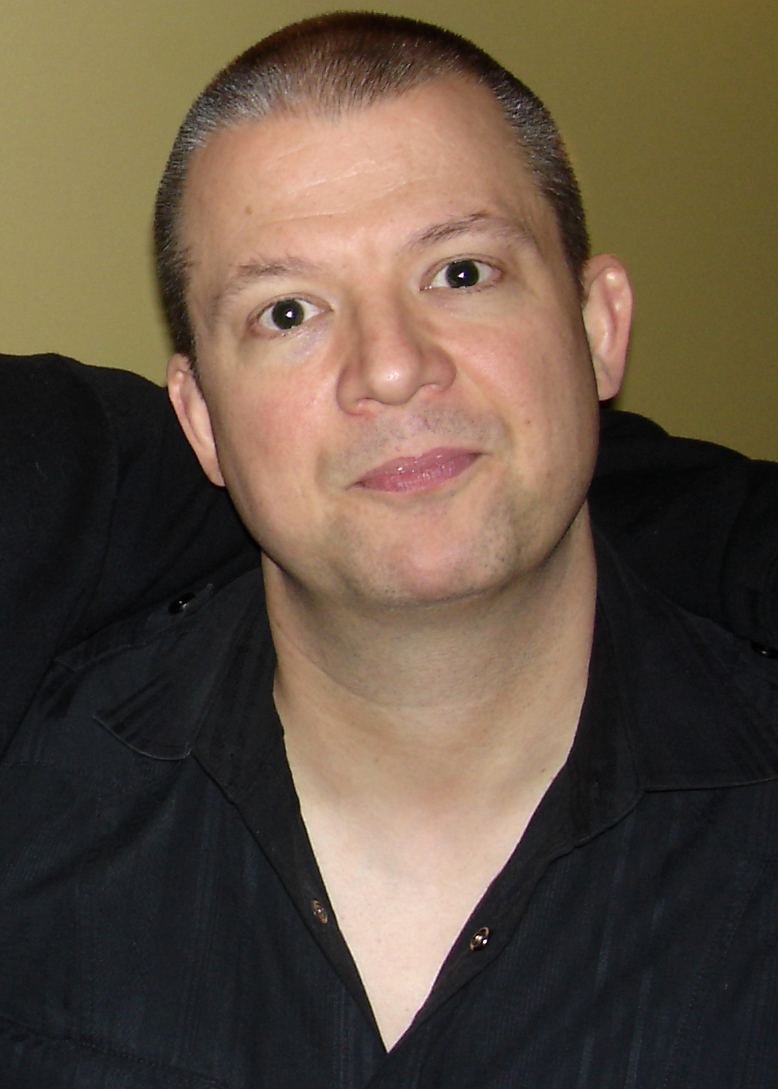
- Norton in 2011
- Born: James Joseph Norton; July 19, 1968 (age 58); Bayonne, New Jersey, U.S.
- Spouse: Nikki Norton (m. 2023)

Comedy career
- Years active: 1990–present
- Medium: Stand-up comedy; radio; television
- Genres: Cringe humor; black comedy; satire; observational comedy; character comedy
- Subjects: Human sexuality; self-deprecation
- Website: jimnorton.com

James Joseph Norton (born July 19, 1968) is an American comedian, radio personality, actor, author, and television and podcast host. Norton has been the co-host of the podcast UFC Unfiltered with Matt Serra since 2016, and the host of Jim Norton Can't Save You since January 2025. He is well known for co-hosting morning radio shows Opie and Anthony, Opie with Jim Norton, and Jim Norton & Sam Roberts on SiriusXM Radio from October 2016 through December 2024, and The Chip Chipperson Podcast (Chip being one of Norton's on-air characters) from 2017 until 2023.

He gained initial prominence as third mic on the radio show Opie and Anthony, with Gregg "Opie" Hughes and Anthony Cumia, from 2001 to 2014.

After becoming a stand-up comedian in 1990, Norton spent his early years developing his act. His appearances on The Louie Show caught the attention of comedian Andrew Dice Clay in 1997, who chose Norton to open for him for his shows. In 2000, Norton made his debut on Opie and Anthony and joined the show as a third mic in 2001 which increased his national exposure. He went on to have a recurring role on the sitcom Lucky Louie and featured as a regular panellist on Tough Crowd with Colin Quinn. Since he joined SiriusXM with Opie and Anthony in 2004, Norton hosted Opie with Jim Norton from 2014 to 2016, and The Jim Norton Advice Show.

Since 2003, Norton has released four comedy albums and seven comedy specials, including three on Epix and one on Netflix. In 2014, Norton hosted The Jim Norton Show, a talk show on Vice. He has written two books: Happy Endings: The Tales of a Meaty-Breasted Zilch and I Hate Your Guts.

== Early life ==
James Joseph Norton was born in Bayonne, New Jersey. He is of Irish descent. His mother was a librarian and his father was a former US Marine and army reservist who later worked as a driver for the US postal service. Norton grew up in North Brunswick, New Jersey with his sister Tracy.

Norton attended North Brunswick High School, from which he dropped out in his senior year. During this time, at age 13, Norton started to drink heavily, "mostly vodka and grain alcohol" because it got him drunk quicker. "That feeling of discomfort that was always there, wasn't there when I drank. It was just a way of feeling comfortable ... I was horribly insecure, horribly shy, always feeling ugly and weak." At 16, Norton started to cut himself with a razor blade in an attempt at "attention-seeking ... It was "notice me!" crap. I was 16, 17, and drunk. I never did that stuff sober." He then missed some schooling, including his graduation from high school, after his alarmed parents sent him to a rehab facility in Princeton, New Jersey for one month, where he continued to sneak in alcohol but changed his thinking and completed the course at 18. When he was away, his class had voted him as class clown. Norton had his last drink at New Year's Eve 1985 going into 1986, and has been alcohol and drug free since. Norton's addictive personality began to direct towards sex after he got sober.

After being sober for around three years, Norton obtained his GED and attended Middlesex County College with the aim of pursuing a Juris Doctor degree and becoming a lawyer, but quit after one month. He earned a B grade in English and failing grades in Problems and Statistics, Science, and Western Civilization. At 18, he took up work in a copper company, operating a forklift to unload boxed tubes of copper from trucks, which he remembered as being "awful." He was fired from the job at age 23. Norton collected unemployment benefits for several years, pretending to look for work while doing sets in local comedy venues, before he decided to pursue comedy full-time.

== Career ==
=== Stand-up ===
Norton wished to pursue a career as a stand-up comedian when he was 12. He took an interest to comedy after his mother brought home comedy albums from work, and names Richard Pryor, George Carlin, Woody Allen, and Robert Klein as his influences. Norton performed his first stand-up routine in April 1990 at an open mic night at Varsity, a pub in Sayreville, New Jersey, when he was 21. He later described his performance as "awful." Norton credited Pat Gaynor for putting him on stage that night, and Ward and John Magnuson of Rascals comedy club as being "instrumental" in his early development. Following his debut, Norton spent five years working on his stand-up traveling to New York, New Jersey, Boston, Pennsylvania, Maryland, and Florida with comedians Jim Florentine and Bob Levy, who were coming up at the same time. Norton developed an act based on self-deprecating humor, which came naturally to him and gained encouragement when other comedians told him they enjoyed it. Around ten years into stand-up, Norton felt he had found his voice and felt comfortable enough on stage.

Norton had a breakthrough in 1997 after comedian Andrew Dice Clay noticed his appearance on The Louie Show and asked him to be his opening act on his tours when his original pick cancelled at the last minute. The two first met at the Comedy Store in Los Angeles where Norton was doing his first gig at the venue, and learned Clay wished to go on stage after him. Norton went on to open for Clay in the course of the following three years, playing large venues including Madison Square Garden in New York City in 2000.

The absence of Opie and Anthony from the airwaves between August 2002 and October 2004 encouraged Norton to write and develop his stand-up act. Soon after the show's cancellation, he underwent his Yellow Discipline Tour. In 2003, he had assembled a new 45-minute set and assembled his first comedy album, Yellow Discipline, which was followed by Trinkets I Own Made from Gorilla Hands, in April 2005. Soon after, Norton filmed his first half-hour HBO comedy special as part of the network's One Night Stand series, at NYU's Skirball Center for the Performing Arts after his manager informed him of the chance to perform a showcase in the New York City area. In 2004, Norton was voted best comedian and breakthrough performer of the year on Cringe Humor. Following his return to radio in 2004, Norton began a weekday routine of doing radio in the morning and performing short sets in a New York City comedy club, mostly the Comedy Cellar, in the evening to work on new material. From 2006 to 2008, Norton featured on every show of the annual Opie and Anthony's Traveling Virus Comedy Tour. In 2008, Norton hosted a four-part show on HBO titled Down and Dirty with Jim Norton that featured Lemmy as its musical director. He had Amy Schumer be his opening act in her early career.

Norton had a productive start in the 2010s, writing and releasing three hour long specials in three and a half years. He released his first, Please Be Offended on the television channel Epix in June 2012, and features Ozzy Osbourne sitting on a toilet introducing Norton. He chose the network as they allowed him complete creative freedom and were willing to promote his product. Norton followed it with American Degenerate, his second for Epix, which aired in August 2013 before it was released on Netflix that November. In April 2015, Norton released his fourth Epix special, Contextually Inadequate. Within three months of its release, Norton was touring with a new hour of material. In the following year, Norton described his career as "stagnant... there's nothing happening."

In 2017, Norton's special A Mouthful of Shame debuted on Netflix. He promoted it with the 31-date Mouthful of Shame Tour, his first nationwide theatre tour as headliner, throughout 2016. The special includes an opening with Robert De Niro spanking Norton's bare bottom. Later in 2017, Norton embarked on his first stand-up tour of Europe. He signed with WME to pitch ideas for his own series on Netflix. He appeared in Season 2, Episode 1 of the Netflix standup comedy series "The Degenerates," released on December 31, 2019.

=== Radio ===
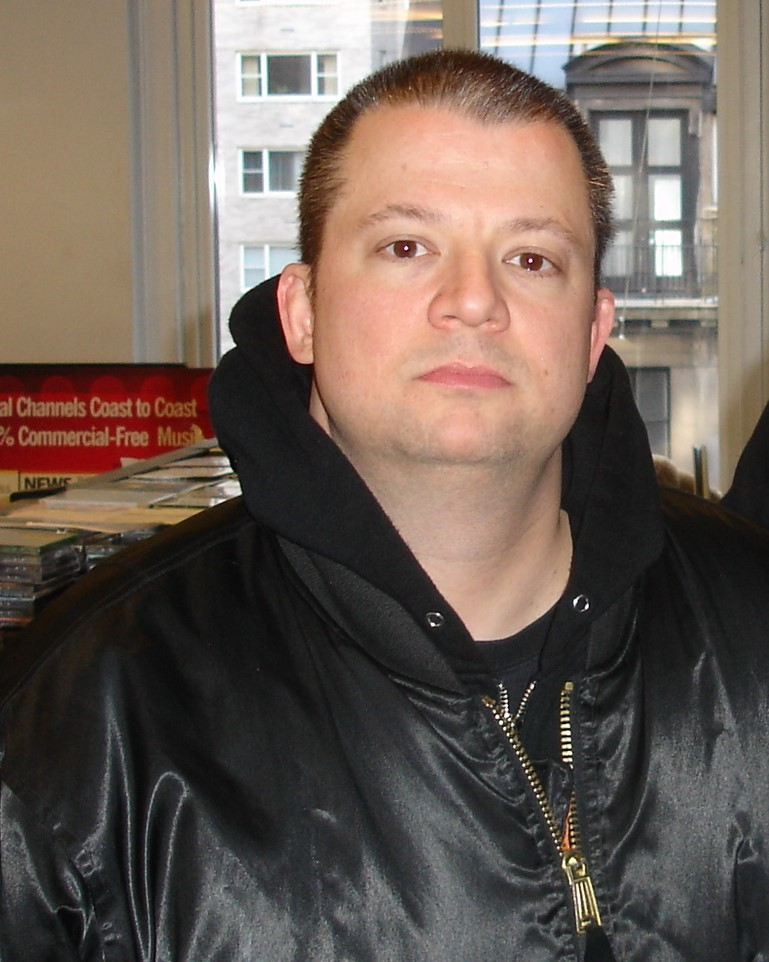
Jim Norton, in the Opie and Anthony studio in 2005

In early 2001, Norton was hired as the third mic on the Opie and Anthony radio show on WNEW in New York City, with hosts Gregg "Opie" Hughes and Anthony Cumia. He resisted calling himself a "host" of the show as he believes his strongest performances were when he was "an outsider looking in." He first appeared on the show in 2000 with Clay during his time opening for him on tour and became a regular guest and sat in on some shows. In November 2000, Norton was arrested with comedian Lewis Black and show producer Rick Del Gado during their live reports on board the Teen Voyeur Bus, a transparent bus of topless women driving around the city. It so happened that the bus' route was also the route that President Bill Clinton was taking that day, but the show was not informed of the news. Norton spent the night in jail. In August 2002, the show was cancelled following the controversial Sex for Sam 3 segment and remained off the air for two years. Norton returned to the radio with Hughes and Cumia on XM Satellite Radio, an uncensored satellite radio service, in October 2004. Cumia said Norton contributed a "dark and perverse" side to the show.

In October 2008, Norton was sued by New York City attorney Roy Den Hollander over his treatment during a phone interview on Opie and Anthony. In August 2009, The New York Post reported that Hollander was willing to drop his suit if Norton would also drop his motion to have Hollander sanctioned for filing a baseless claim, as well as being forced to pay Norton's legal fees.

On December 2, 2009, Norton had an on-air argument with Jesse Ventura about the September 11 attacks and measures against illegal immigration. Ventura was arguing against what Norton claimed was the Border Patrol practice of stopping individuals and asking them to produce ID deep within US borders, claiming that such actions were unconstitutional. At some point, when Norton disagreed with him on this, Ventura suggested that Norton did not believe in the Constitution to which Norton strongly objected. Soon after, as the argument became more heated, Ventura walked off the air and the two exchanged explicit comments towards each other.

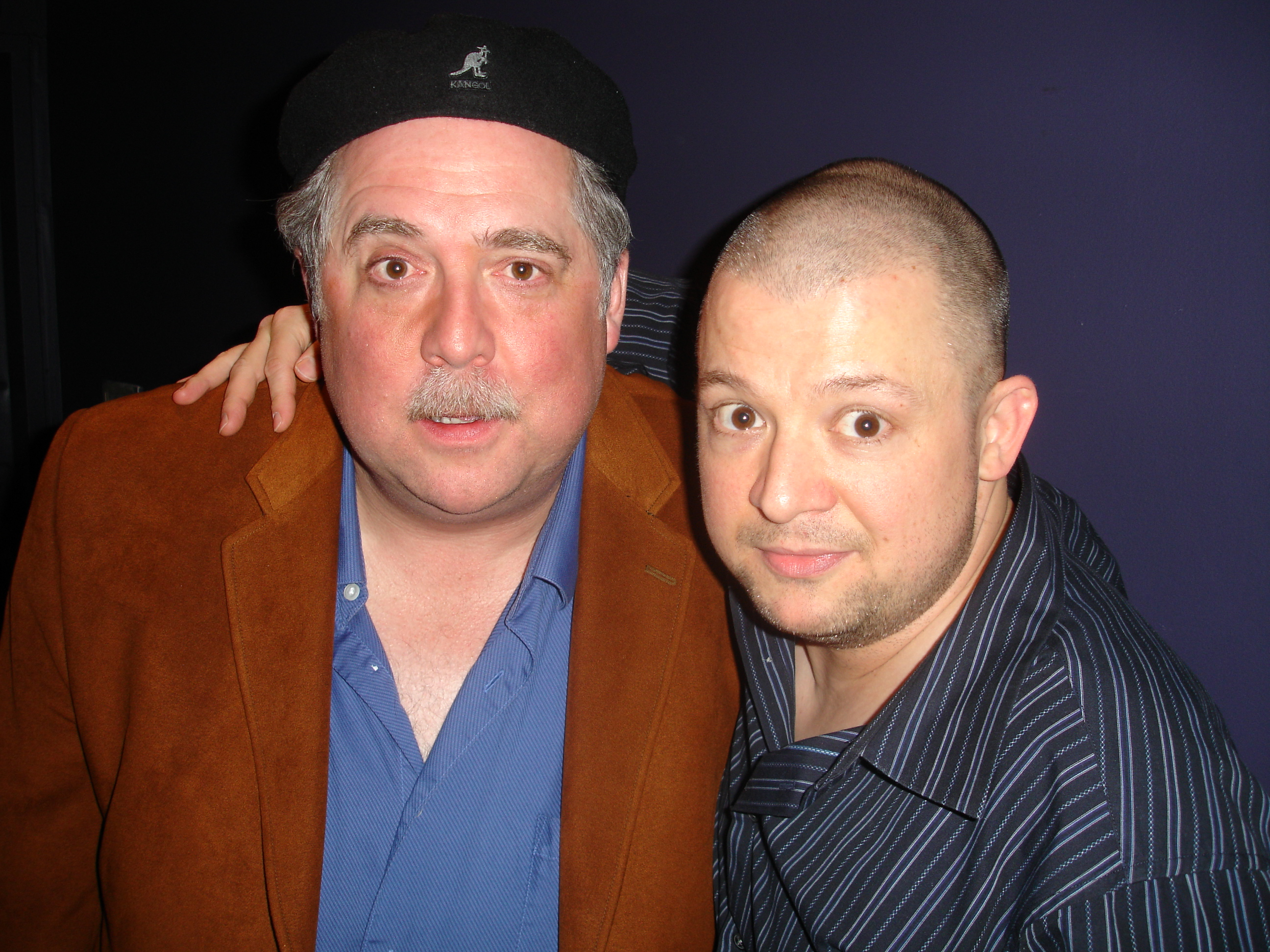
Norton with fellow comedian Rob Bartlett at Carolines on Broadway in 2006

In May 2010, The Jim Norton Show premiered on the Raw Dog Comedy channel on SiriusXM. The show featured Norton as the host with other comedians plus clips of live stand-up.

After Cumia was fired from SiriusXM in July 2014, Hughes and Norton continued to broadcast and became the hosts of Opie with Jim Norton, during which time the channel was renamed Opie Radio. Norton quickly missed working with Cumia, disliked the title of the re-branded program, and felt that he had not taken over the vacant spot left by Cumia, but rather was a voice on a show hosted by Hughes. The show ended in September 2016. During this time, Norton also hosted a weekly advice show on SiriusXM named The Jim Norton Advice Show.

In October 2016, Norton became the host of Jim Norton & Sam Roberts with former Opie and Anthony intern and producer Sam Roberts. Norton also hosted a nightly one-hour playlist segment on Ozzy's Boneyard, a channel on SiriusXM, named Obsessed that aired some of Norton's favorite tracks. In January 2025, Norton revealed that he and SiriusXM had parted ways after failing to come to terms on a contract renewal, ending his tenure with SiriusXM after just over 20 years.

=== Podcasting ===
In mid-2016, Norton ended an online crowdfunding campaign via Indiegogo for the production of The Chip Chipperson Show, an animated web series based on the same titled character that he does on the radio. He started the character as a way of hassling his girlfriend. He had received many requests to have the concept animated, and launched the project to have five full episodes made by Big Hug Productions. Norton voiced the character in the series that also featured his other characters, including Uncle Paul Harghis, Jelly, Edgar Mellencamp, and Ted Scheckler. The fund raised over $61,000 from 724 donators.

In May 2016, Norton became the co-host of UFC Unfiltered, the first Ultimate Fighting Championship audio podcast, with former fighter Matt Serra. The pair record two episodes each week. The first episode launched on June 21, 2016, and has since run for over 550 episodes. Norton then launched his own weekly audio and video podcast based on his Chip Chipperson character, on the Riotcast network. The Chip Chipperson Podacast launched on April 9, 2017. In May 2020, Norton debuted the Doug Bellcast, a new podcast based on his new character, Doug Bell.

In 2025, Norton started a new podcast, Jim Norton Can't Save You.

In July 2026, Norton reunited with Anthony Cumia for the "Anthony and Jim Show" on Patreon and YouTube, with extended shows for Patreon subscribers.

=== Television ===
In 1997, Norton appeared on The Louie Show starring Louie Anderson. From 2002 to 2004, Norton was a regular performer on the comedy series Tough Crowd with Colin Quinn. He then lost his place on the second season of Last Comic Standing in 2004 because of a contractual obligation to film pilot episodes for MTV which he had secured following the success of his One Night Stand special. The two pilots were Camp Cool, filmed in Cancún for MTV Spring Break, also starring Al Shearer about helping men meet women, and Stupid Bets. His manager advised him not to compete in Last Comic Standing as it was a reality show, but he agreed as he was depressed and frustrated with the uncertainty of his career as Opie and Anthony had been cancelled. Norton had a contract with Viacom during this time.

In September 2004, Norton made his first appearance on The Tonight Show with Jay Leno, and appeared twice more by mid-2006. He has appeared many times since, including as a correspondent named "The Uninvited Guest." In April 2005, Norton starred in a pilot episode for Louis C.K.'s HBO sitcom Lucky Louie, playing as Louie's friend Rich. He landed the role after the series was picked up by the network and aired through 2006. In 2007, Norton co-hosted the AVN Awards with Jessica Drake. In June 2008, Norton appeared in several episodes of The Gong Show with Dave Attell as one of the celebrity judges. Since mid-2007, Norton has been a regular guest on Red Eye w/ Greg Gutfeld on Fox News which he later credited as a contributor in boosting turnouts to his comedy shows. In 2010, Norton guest-hosted Red Eye. Starting in 2010, Norton began appearing in Louis C.K.'s FX sitcom Louie. In 2010, Norton's role in Bored to Death was tailored by its creator Jonathan Ames, a fan of his. In 2013, Norton said he had pitched a television show about a sex addict radio show host, but it was not picked up.

In July 2014, Norton debuted his four-episode talk show, The Jim Norton Show, on Vice a first for the network. The show featured opening monologues, pre-recorded bits, and guest interviews including co-host Bailey Jay, comedians Dave Attell, Whitney Cummings, and Gilbert Gottfried; and Mike Tyson, Dana White, and "Freeway" Rick Ross. Norton had assistance with the writing from comedians Kurt Metzger and Jesse Joyce. Vice had expressed an interest in filming more episodes, but Norton became unsure because he wasn't paid for the first season . Looking back on the project, Norton was pleased with its outcome and entered talks with regard to continuing the format with other networks. In 2015, Norton starred in an episode of Quinn's parody television series Cop Show. In April 2016, Norton revealed that he had shot two pilot episodes for a potential comedy series on the AMC channel. Though it was not picked up, the show was reworked into a discussion program where he hosts a panel who talk about a single subject for thirty minutes.

=== Books ===
In early 2007, Norton announced the near completion of his first book, a collection of stories of his life with anecdotes from his childhood and his comedy career. Happy Endings: The Tales of a Meaty-Breasted Zilch was released on July 10, 2007. It reached No. 4 on The New York Times Best Seller list under hardcover non-fiction, and entered the Amazon.com Top 10 for books the day it was released, peaking at No. 7.

Norton released his second book, I Hate Your Guts, on November 4, 2008. It reached No. 13 on The New York Times Best Seller list under hardcover non-fiction. He criticizes people in the book, including Al Sharpton, Keith Olbermann, and Steve Martin, which includes a rant that Norton later regretted and has since apologized for to Martin.

=== Film ===
In 2002, Norton appeared on the short film Crooks, a straight to video release about postal workers stealing stamps. Norton has had various cameo appearances such as in the 2002 film Spider-Man and the 2008 film Zack and Miri Make a Porno. He has also appeared in the films Furry Vengeance, Cop Out, and Special Correspondents. Norton recalled around 2003 being a time when his acting career had gained some momentum.

In 2016, Norton landed a role in From Nowhere, a critically acclaimed independent film about three teenagers from the Bronx. This was followed by an appearance in Pitching Tents. Norton had a pivotal role in the 2008 film Courting Condi, counseling Devin Ratray on how to win the heart of Condoleezza Rice.

Norton starred in the crime film The Irishman as a young Don Rickles who tells jokes to a crowd with Robert De Niro and Joe Pesci present. He landed the part without an audition, and De Niro requested that Norton perform his own material after using jokes from Rickles's act from the 1970s.

== Personal life ==
In 2007, Norton bought an apartment on the Upper West Side of New York City. He is a longtime fan of Ozzy Osbourne, Black Sabbath, and Kiss and is a close family friend of Sharon Osbourne. He was also a close friend of her husband, Ozzy, before his death in 2025. Norton is a supporter of transgender people.

On the October 23, 2023, episode of radio show Jim Norton & Sam Roberts, Norton announced that he had married a Norwegian trans woman webcam model named Nikki.

Norton has sleep apnea. He has shared in his stand-up "how frustrating it is that my mouth is trying to murder me in my sleep." In 2012, discussing his condition and his efforts to ameliorate it, he said that his sleep apnea mask impacted his sex life, because it was: "the pussy dryer-upper. That's what it's called. I haven't been wearing it at all because ... the CPAP is not the right mask. I need a BiPAP so I'm in the process of getting a new one... I'm sure I'll be wearing the mask again. The mask is certainly a turn off but honestly, I don't care if they like the mask or not. If they can deal with the herpes they can deal with the mask. [Laughs.] I wouldn't put it on when I'm about to fuck but I don't care about stuff like that. If they can tolerate me nude nothing else is going to matter."

== Selected works ==
Albums

Year	Title	Notes
2003	Yellow Discipline	Recorded at The Stress Factory in New Brunswick, New Jersey
2005	Trinkets I Own Made from Gorilla Hands	Recorded at The Stress Factory
2011	Despicable	Recorded at The Stress Factory
2012	No Baby For You!	Recorded in Boston in 2007

DVDs/Specials

Year	Title	Notes
2005	One Night Stand: Jim Norton	30 minute HBO special
2007	Monster Rain	Recorded at The Lincoln Theater in Washington, D.C.
2009	Down and Dirty with Jim Norton	Stand-up showcase, hosted by Norton
2012	Please Be Offended	1 hr EPIX special recorded at Ohio Theatre in Cleveland
2013	American Degenerate	1 hr EPIX special recorded in Boston
2015	Contextually Inadequate	1 hr EPIX special recorded in Boston
2017	A Mouthful of Shame	1 hour Netflix special recorded in New York
2019	The Degenerates: Jim Norton	20 minute Netflix special
2025	Unconceivable	YouTube special

Books

Year	Title	Notes
2007	Happy Endings: The Tales of a Meaty-Breasted Zilch	Foreword by Colin Quinn
2008	I Hate Your Guts	A collection of 35 venomous essays

== Filmography ==
=== Actor ===
Year	Title	Role	Notes
1997	Brokers	Homeless Guy	
2000	Sidesplitters: The Burt & Dick Story	Dick	Short film
2000	Ed	Ernie	Two episodes
2002	Run Ronnie Run!	Police Officer	Uncredited
2002	American Dummy	Eddie Barnum	Short film
2002	Errors, Freaks & Oddities	Paul	
2002	Spider-Man	Surly Truck Driver	
2002	Rock Bottom	Diesel	
2002	Crooks	Paul	Short film featuring Norton as Paul, Jessica Alexander as Carmela, and Rozie Bacchi as Maggie Bagley
2003	The Gynecologists	Sheldrake	Short film
2006	Bully	Officer Morrison (Voice)	Video game
2006–07	Lucky Louie	Rich	13 episodes
2008	Zack and Miri Make a Porno	Auditioner	
2008	Grand Theft Auto IV	Joseph Kaplan, Chuck Williams-Jones (Just or Unjust) (voice)	Video game
2008	Courting Condi	Himself	
2009	Z Rock	Himself	1 episode
2010	Cop Out	George	
2010	Furry Vengeance	Hank	
2010	Bored to Death	Jim	Episode: "The Gowanus Canal Has Gonorrhea!"
2010–15	Louie	Jim / Pig	10 episodes
2012	True Bromance	Best Bro	
2012	Who Is Tara Thomas?	Himself	Short film
2013–16	Inside Amy Schumer	Various	5 episodes
2014	Teachers Lounge	Head of Security	
2014	Top Five	Himself	
2015	Deadbeat	Carl	Episode: "The Spank Job"
2015	Benders	Brian Beale	Episode: "Wake 'Em Up"
2015	The Knick	Camera Man	Episode: "Williams and Walker"
2015	Trainwreck	Carriage Driver	
2016	From Nowhere	Louis	
2016	Special Correspondents	Rent Boy	
2016	Nightcap	Himself	Episode: "A-List Thief"
2016	The Comedian	Himself	
2016	Pitching Tents	Mr. Mulligan	
2016–2017	Power	Father Callahan	8 episodes
2017	Crashing	Himself	Episode: "The Baptism"
2019	The Irishman	Don Rickles	
2020	NOS4A2	Ernie Hicks	Episode: "Good Father"
2023	Among the Beasts	Jordy	
2025	Smiling Friends	Mothman	Episode: "Pim and Charlie Save Mother Nature"

Key
†	Denotes films that have not yet been released

=== Writer ===
Year	Title	Notes
2005	One Night Stand	
2007	Jim Norton: Monster Rain	Stand-up special
2012	Jim Norton: Please Be Offended	Stand-up special
2012	Jim Norton: American Degenerate	Stand-up special

=== Self ===
Year	Title	Notes
1998	The Jim Breuer Show	Episode: "Pilot"
1998	White Chicks, Incorporated	
2002	Comedian	Documentary
2002–2004	Tough Crowd with Colin Quinn	
2004	Meet The Creeps Vol. 1	
2004	Last Comic Standing	Episode: "Las Vegas Finals: Part 2"
2004–11	The Tonight Show with Jay Leno	
2005	One Night Stand	Episode: "Jim Norton"
2006	Al Franken: God Spoke	Documentary
2006–09	Late Show with David Letterman	2 episodes
2007	Lucky Louie: A Week In The Life	1 episode
2007	Jimmy Kimmel Live!	1 episode
2007	Jim Norton: Monster Rain	Stand-up special
2007–12	Red Eye w/ Greg Gutfeld	
2008	The Gong Show with Dave Attell	2 episodes
2008	Down and Dirty with Jim Norton	4 episodes
2008	The Comedy Central Roast of Bob Saget	
2009	Impaled: Painfully Blunt!	Documentary
2009	The Tragic Side of Comedy	TV documentary
2009–13	Hannity	
2009–14	Chelsea Lately	8 episodes
2010	Just for Laughs	1 episode
2011	That Metal Show	1 episode
2011	Looking for Lenny	Documentary
2011	Dave's Old Porn	Episode: "Jim Norton/Seka"
2011	Imagine	Episode: "The Art of Stand-Up – Part Two"
2011–	The Joe Rogan Experience	8 episodes
2012	The Rock & Roll Roast of Zakk Wylde	
2012	Jim Norton: Please Be Offended	Stand-up special
2012	Late Night with Jimmy Fallon	1 episode
2012	The Burn with Jeff Ross	1 episode
2012	Love You, Mean It with Whitney Cummings	1 episode
2013	Rock and Roll Roast of Dee Snider	
2013	Four Courses with J.B. Smoove	
2013	The Jeselnik Offensive	1 episode
2013	Insane Clown Posse Theater	1 episode
2013	Jim Norton: American Degenerate	Stand-up special
2013–14	Kevin Pollak's Chat Show	2 episodes
2014	I Am Road Comic	Documentary
2014	Comedy Underground with Dave Attell	1 episode
2014	The Jim Norton Show	4 episodes
2014	@midnight	1 episode
2015	Misery Loves Comedy	Documentary
2015	Jim Norton: Contextually Inadequate	Stand-up special
2016	The Eric Andre Show	1 episode
2017	Gilbert	Documentary
2018–	Louder with Crowder	8 episodes
2019	Bar Rescue	Recon spy; Episode: "Doreen's Dilemma"
2023	The Adam Friedland Show	1 episode
2025	Hells Kitchen	Episode: "Five Comedians Walk into Hell..."
