= Yellow Discipline =

Studio album by Jim Norton
- Released: 2003
- Genre: Comedy
- Label: Eat A Bullet
- Producer: Gregg Hughes

Jim Norton chronology
Yellow Discipline (2003)	Trinkets I Own Made From Gorilla Hands (2005)

Yellow Discipline is the first full-length comedy album from comedian Jim Norton.

== Track listing ==
1. "Vinny's awful intro"
2. "New Joisey"
3. "Fargo & a droopy lip"
4. "kill yourself in Seattle"
5. "Bed, Bath & Beyond"
6. "Boca Raton and shaky people"
7. "Michael J Fox is an alcoholic"
8. "Aspen sure is expensive"
9. "Sex & racism"
10. "Michael Jackson is the Artist of the Millennium"
11. "a Britney log"
12. "Liz Taylor's hairy hat"
13. "good ole' Martha"
14. "wacky bumper stickers"
15. "the elephant on Southwest"
16. "making a gal laugh"
17. "adorable observations about the mentally challenged"
18. "actors and my awful head"
19. "a single, impotent, meaty breasted failure"
20. "profiling and the shoe bombing monkey"
21. "I wish I were gay"
22. "sensitive nipples"
23. "loving a chubby dumper"
24. "meaty lips"
25. "squeamish girls stink"
26. "pornography"
27. "oral treats"
28. "Vinny's awful outro"
29. "Jim Norton talking doll"
30. "Jim Norton's motivational tapes"
