= Trinkets I Own Made from Gorilla Hands =

Trinkets I Own Made From Gorilla Hands

Studio album by Jim Norton
- Released: April 2005
- Genre: Comedy
- Label: Eat A Bullet

Jim Norton chronology
Yellow Discipline (2003)	Trinkets I Own Made From Gorilla Hands (2005)	Despicable (2011)

Trinkets I Own Made From Gorilla Hands is the second full-length comedy album released by comedian Jim Norton. It was recorded at The Stress Factory, a club near Norton's home town of Bayonne, New Jersey. The original title was Fat Pigs Deserve to Cry, which still appears on the album's disc art.

== Track listing ==
1. "Another Dumb, Bumbling Vinny Intro"
2. "Hot French People"
3. "The Blackout of '03"
4. "A Fun Date"
5. "Penile Philosophy & Blackout Humor"
6. "No Water = Messy Bowl"
7. "OCD Scumbags"
8. "A Tip on Flirting"
9. "Bloody Lump on the Linoleum"
10. "Ethnic Pride Drivel"
11. "The 'N' Word"
12. "Understandable Racism"
13. "Relations with the Elderly"
14. "Nervous Tics"
15. "Legless Old Lady"
16. "Gay Snipers"
17. "A Shot in the Eye"
18. "Mean-Spirited Christopher Reeve Jokes"
19. "Boys Don't Cry"
20. "Alcohol & True Confessions"
21. "Gay Mommies"
22. "Awful Cosmo Advice"
23. "Television Comedy"
24. "Reality TV"
25. "Shameless Yellow Discipline Plug"
26. "Donkey-Sex and German Porn"
27. "You Like Sucking That?"
28. "Madcap Ideas About Oral Sex"
29. "Vinny's Mercifully Brief Outro"
30. "A Phone Call from Mother"
