= Damage Control (TV series) =

- Genre: Reality television
- Created by: Peter Bennett-Jones
- Developed by: Rico Martinez
- Written by: Ellie Barancik; Trent Haaga
- Directed by: Claudia Frank; Sebastian Doggart
- Presented by: Pierre Bouvier
- Opening theme: "Me Against The World" by Simple Plan
- Countries of origin: United Kingdom; United States
- Original language: English
- No. of seasons: 2

Production
- Executive producers: Rico Martinez; Rabih Gholam
- Producer: Frank Sutera
- Production locations: New Jersey, United States
- Editors: Diana DeCilio; Alanna Yudin
- Production companies: Tiger Aspect Productions; Rico Martinez Productions; MTV Series Entertainment

Original release
- Network: MTV
- Release: March 6 – April 24, 2005

Damage Control is a reality television series produced by MTV. Hosted by Pierre Bouvier, the lead vocalist of Canadian rock band Simple Plan, and directed by Sebastian Doggart. The show was a real-life version of the movie Risky Business. It first aired on MTV on March 6, 2005. The last episode was broadcast on April 24, 2005.

== Premise ==
Each episode begins with parents telling their teenage son or daughter that they are going away for the weekend. What the teenager does not know is that their parents actually hide out with Bouvier a short distance from their home. Using secret cameras and an insider friend of the teenager, the parents and Bouvier watch the teen's every move. Parents can win money by correctly predicting the next action their child will take.

At the end of the weekend, the parents return home as promised. The teen can then win money by confessing to their parents about the events that took place. Eventually, Bouvier appears on the set to defuse the situation. He reveals what actually happened — "to do some damage control," as he says.

== Production ==
The format was created by UK company Tiger Aspect Productions Two eight-episode seasons were filmed before any episodes were aired.

== MTV information ==
Damage Control's theme song was "Me Against the World", the fifth track from Still Not Getting Any..., the second album by Bouvier's band, Simple Plan.

Damage Control was aired on MTV on Sunday nights alongside Punk'd, Pimp My Ride, and Viva La Bam. Collectively, the four shows were known on MTV as the Sunday Stew lineup.
