= Devin Ratray =

American actor (born 1977)

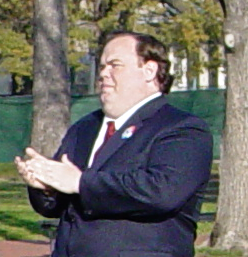
- Ratray during the filming of Courting Condi in December 2007
- Born: January 11, 1977 (age 49); New York City, U.S.
- Occupation: Actor
- Years active: 1986–2022

Devin Ratray (born January 11, 1977) is an American former actor. He began his career as a child actor, making his film debut in Where Are the Children? (1986) before a main role as Gus Stafford on the CBS sitcom Heartland (1989). Ratray had his breakout with the supporting role of Buzz McCallister, the malicious older brother of Macaulay Culkin's character in the Christmas film Home Alone (1990), which he reprised in the sequels Home Alone 2: Lost in New York (1992) and Home Sweet Home Alone (2021).

Ratray later had a supporting role in the film Dennis the Menace (1993). In the 2000s, he had supporting roles in the films The Prince & Me (2004), The Winning Season (2009), and Surrogates (2009). During the 2010s, Ratray experienced a career resurgence, with starring roles in the films Elevator (2011) and Blue Ruin (2013), and supporting roles in the films Nebraska (2013), R.I.P.D. (2013), Masterminds (2016), and Hustlers (2019). He also had a main role as Nate Henry in the HBO miniseries Mosaic (2018) and recurred as Tinfoil Kevin on the Amazon Prime Video series The Tick (2017–2019).

In the 2020s, Ratray had a starring role in the comedy film Hollywood.Con (2021) and had a supporting role in the thriller film Kimi (2022).

== Early life ==
Ratray was born in New York City, the son of Ann Willis and Peter Ratray, both actors. He graduated from New York's Fiorello H. LaGuardia High School in 1994.

== Career ==
Ratray started acting at the age of nine in the movie Where Are the Children? (1986). He starred as a child actor in various other programs and movies until his acting pinnacle in 1990 as Buzz McCallister, the bullying older brother of Macaulay Culkin's character, Kevin in Home Alone and Home Alone 2: Lost in New York (1992), a role he later reprised in Home Sweet Home Alone (2021).

Ratray landed minor roles in Little Monsters (as Ronnie Coleman, the bully), Dennis the Menace (as Mickey, the boyfriend of Dennis's babysitter, Polly) and an episode as Martin in The Enforcers (1996). Another film role was The Prince and Me as the computer-obsessed roommate of Eddy, the royal Prince of Denmark. He was a regular improv actor on MTV's Damage Control, notably as a director of an erotic film called Crazy Motor Hos, in which he was dressed as a naval captain. Ratray appeared in the September 29, 2006 episode of Law & Order, "Avatar", as the mentally ill murderer Richard Elam. He later portrayed an antagonist in an episode of Law & Order: Special Victims Unit. He was a lisping doctor in the movie Slippery Slope (2006). He performed as Jimmy Link in Serial (2007). Ratray appeared in the 2009 film Surrogates as Bobby Saunders. Variety said "Ratray gets good mileage out of his role as a computer whiz too proud of his corpulent geekiness to consider a more glamorous substitute." In 2009, he was also a guest star on the fifth season of Supernatural in the episode "The Real Ghost Busters".

In late 2007, a documentary film crew followed Ratray's attempts to win the heart of US Secretary of State Condoleezza Rice. He used 'love disks' – love letters set to music and images – to serenade her, and traveled from New York, to Alabama, Denver, Palo Alto and Washington, DC to court her. The resulting film, Courting Condi, was due for international release in fall 2008.

In 2012, Ratray played a mutual funds manager trapped in a Wall Street elevator with eight strangers, in the suspense thriller Elevator.

In 2013, Ratray played Cole in the film Nebraska, Ben Gaffney in the film Blue Ruin, and made an appearance in the film R.I.P.D.

Ratray also appeared in the 2019 film Hustlers, alongside Jennifer Lopez and in 2022, he appeared in the Steven Soderbergh film Kimi, alongside Zoe Kravitz.

He played Alfred Hawthorne Hill in the Better Call Saul episode Breaking Bad.

== Personal life ==
=== Allegations of domestic violence and rape ===
On December 8, 2021, Ratray allegedly strangled his girlfriend while in a hotel room in Oklahoma. He was "booked for domestic assault and battery by strangulation, a felony, as well as misdemeanor domestic assault and battery." After an argument over his girlfriend failing to charge fans for his autograph, the duo returned to the hotel and "Ratray then pushed his girlfriend onto the room's bed, pressed one of his hands against her throat, pressed his other hand over her mouth and applied pressure, according to the affidavit." It was alleged that as Ratray assaulted his girlfriend, he told her, "This is how you die". In February 2024, he received a 3-year suspended sentence.

In August 2022, the New York Police Department announced that Ratray was under investigation for an alleged rape that occurred in September 2017. The alleged victim, who had been friends with Ratray for 15 years, came forward after hearing about the 2021 domestic assault allegations, accusing Ratray of drugging her drink.

== Filmography ==
=== Film ===
Year	Title	Role	Notes
1986	Where Are the Children?	Neil Keeney	
1988	The River Pirates	Bubba	
1988	Zits	Oscar Opily	
1989	Little Monsters	Ronnie Coleman	
1989	Worth Winning	Howard Larimore Jr.	
1990	Home Alone	Buzz McCallister	
1992	Home Alone 2: Lost in New York	Buzz McCallister	
1993	Dennis the Menace	Mickey	
1997	Strong Island Boys	Cal	
2001	The Bill	Thug	Short film
2004	The Prince and Me	Scotty	
2006	Slippery Slope	Hospital Assistant	
2007	Serial	Jimmy Link	
2007	The Cake Eaters	JJ	
2009	The 2 Bobs	Horizontal Bob	
2009	The Winning Season	Security Officer	
2009	Surrogates	Bobby	
2009	The Flying Scissors	The Rock	
2009	Breaking Point	Kevin	
2011	True Bromance	Himself	also Writer
2011	Elevator	Martin Gosling	
2013	Side Effects	Banks Patient #3	
2013	Blue Ruin	Ben Gaffney	
2013	Nebraska	Cole	
2013	R.I.P.D.	Pulaski	
2015	3rd Street Blackout	Adam Dodario	
2015	Construction	Ray	
2016	The Lennon Report	Phil Bernstein	
2016	Masterminds	Runny	
2017	Life Hack	Larry	
2017	Rough Night	Bud	
2019	Hustlers	Stephen	
2021	Hollywood.Con	Andy Slimmick	
2021	Home Sweet Home Alone	Buzz McCallister	
2021	Construction	Ray	
2022	Kimi	Kevin	

=== Television ===
Year	Title	Role	Notes
1987	If It's Tuesday, It Still Must Be Belgium	IRA	Television film
1989	Heartland	Gus Stafford	Main role; 10 episodes
1991	Perfect Harmony	Shelby	Television film
1995–2006	Law & Order	Richard Elam / Mitchell Pauley	2 episodes
1996	New York Undercover	Martin	Episode: "The Enforcers"
2002	Third Watch	Mike	Episode: "Ladies' Day"
2004	Law & Order: Criminal Intent	Kenny Miles	Episode: "In the Dark"
2006	Conviction	Pete Garrison	Episode: "Denial"
2009	The Superagent	Energetic Announcer	Television film
2009	Supernatural	Damien / "Dean"	Episode: "The Real Ghostbusters"
2010	Odd Jobs	Joe Bannon	Television film
2011	Law & Order: Special Victims Unit	Eldon Balogh	Episode: "Possessed"
2012	The Good Wife	Kevin Costas	Episode: "Two Girls, One Code"
2013	Person of Interest	Beat Cop	Episode: "The Crossing"
2014	An American Education	Ron Gelman	Television film
2015	Elementary	Gordon Meadows	Episode: "The View From Olympus"
2015	Agent Carter	Sheldon McFee	2 episodes
2015	Louie	Mike	Episode: "The Road: Part 1"
2017	Blue Bloods	Matthew Kindler	Episode: "Shadow of a Doubt"
2017	Girls	Party Guest	Episode: "Full Disclosure"
2017–2018	Mosaic	Detective Nate Henry	Recurring role; 6 episodes
2017–2019	The Tick	Tinfoil Kevin	Recurring role; 16 episodes
2018	Hawaii Five-0	Harris Stubman	Episode: "Kopi Wale No I Ka L'a A 'Eu No Ka Ilo"
2018	The Good Fight	Kevin Costas	Episode: "Day 485"
2018	Chicago Med	Tommy Burke	Recurring role; 4 episodes
2019	Russian Doll	Deli Customer	Episode: "The Great Escape"
2019	The Movies That Made Us	Himself	Episode: "Home Alone"
2022	Better Call Saul	Alfred Hawthorne Hill	Episode: "Breaking Bad"

=== Video games ===
Year	Title	Voice role	Notes
2018	Red Dead Redemption 2	The Local Pedestrian Population	Also motion capture

=== Producer ===
Year	Title	Notes
2008	Courting Condi	Documentary film
