= Total Immersion (augmented reality) =

- Type: Private company
- Industry: Software
- Founded: 1999 in Aubervilliers, Paris, France
- Headquarters: Suresnes, Paris, France
- Area served: Worldwide
- Key people: Bruno Uzzan (CEO)
- Products: Developer platforms, D’Fusion Suite, D’Fusion For Adobe Flash, D’Fusion,
- Number of employees: 90 (2012)
- Website: www.t-immersion.com

Total Immersion was a French augmented reality company based in Suresnes. The company maintained offices in Europe, North America, and Asia. The company became defunct in 2014.

== History ==
Total Immersion was founded in 1999 in Aubervilliers, France, by Bruno Uzzan, who became its CEO, and Valentin Lefèvre, who was its former general director. Their headquarters were in Suresnes, France.

As the company grew, Total Immersion established its first international office in San Francisco, California, in the United States. They later relocated their American branch closer to their clientele in Los Angeles. They also opened offices in London, Hong Kong, and Tokyo, with over 90 employees across their 5 international offices.

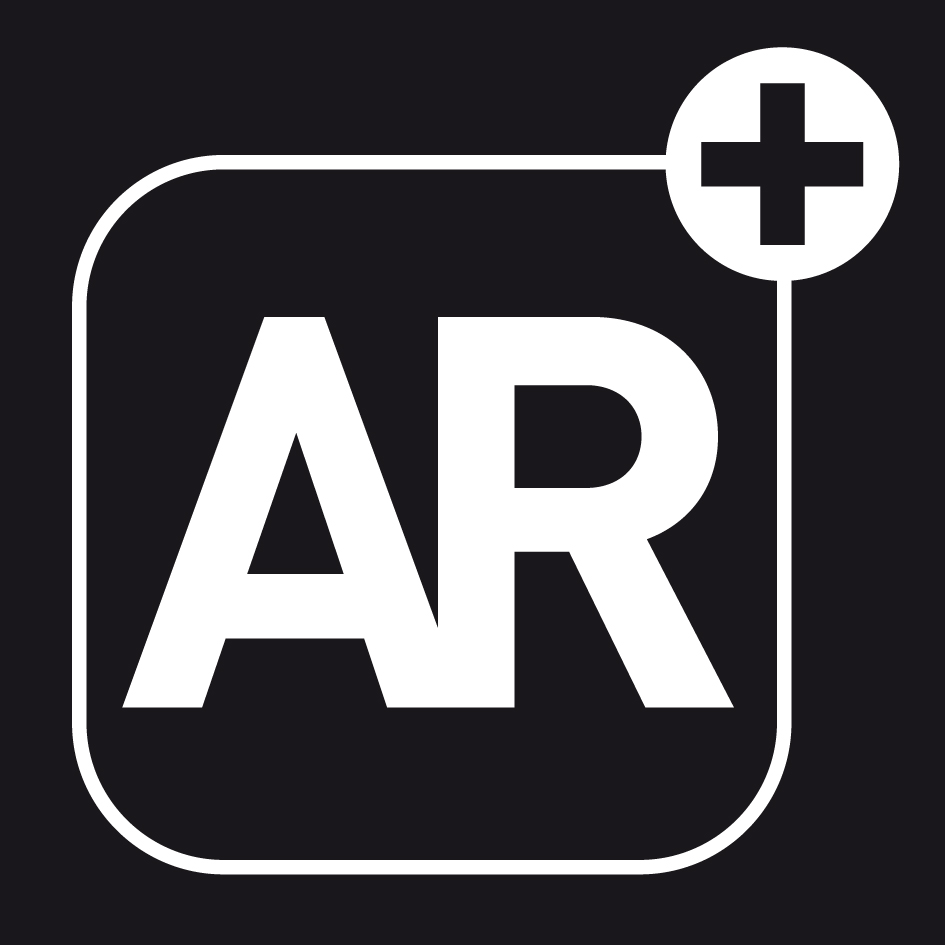
The Augmented Reality symbol created for the entire community of AR users

In June 2010, at the very first Augmented Reality convention ever held, it was announced that Total Immersion had created a community logo to encourage the creation of shared standards and a communications framework. This collective, participative process aimed to advance uniformity and organization among Augmented Reality users so that the technological community and new members could recognize the logo immediately.

The company quietly went defunct in 2014 after a supposed sale of its intellectual property by CEO Bruno Uzzan.

== Recognition ==
In 2009, the company was awarded the "Best Web-Based Augmented Reality Demo" & "Best Innovative Cultural Product" by Augmented Planet for Dokeo Augmented Reality Children’s Encyclopedia

In 2010, the company was awarded the Silver Award for Statoil Event, presented by Jack Morton Experiential Digital Events at the IVCA Awards. It was also awarded the "Best Technological Innovation in e-marketing" & "Best Augmented Reality Application Award" at the Mobile Video Days Awards.

In 2011, the company was the eCommerce Award Winner for best digital innovation product: ATOL TryLive, bringing together “Physical and Digital” to let consumers try online glasses on live client faces, improving the consumer shopping experience. It also won the "Best Use of Print", Bronze Award for Scirroco Cup Campaign, Ogilvy Beijing for Volkswagen at Media Lions Cannes Film Festival

In 2012, the company won the Phénix Bronze Award from the Union of Announcers for the Volkswagen Augmented Reality Application.

== Projects ==
Total Immersion provided augmented reality projects for the following notable clients:

- Orange (telecommunications):
- Ray-Ban
- McDonald's
- Apple
- Coca-Cola
- Nike
- Dior
- Gillette
- Hallmark Cards
- Taco Bell
- Volkswagen
- Pringles
- Kia Motors
- Cartoon Network
- Yoplait
- Citroën
- Paramount Pictures
- eBay
- Olympus Corporation
- Volvo
- Topps
- Alstom
- Nissan Motors
