= Terry Laughlin =

American swimming coach (1951–2017)

- Born: March 25, 1951; Brooklyn, New York
- Died: October 20, 2017 (aged 66)
- Education: St. John's University
- Occupations: American swimming coach and author
- Known for: Total Immersion

Terrence James Laughlin (25 March 1951 – 20 October 2017), was an American swimming coach and founder of Total Immersion, a popular swimming technique that emphasizes form before speed. He also became a best-selling author and the producer of swimming videos that drew millions of views.

== Early life and education ==
Laughlin (pronounced LOCK-lin) was born March 25, 1951, in Brooklyn, New York to electrician John Laughlin and Patricia O’Toole, who worked in a doctor's office. The oldest of six children, he grew up on Long Island, in Williston Park. He graduated from St. Mary’s High School, a Catholic high school in Manhasset, New York, and then St. John's University in Queens. He majored in political science and graduated in 1972.

== Career ==
=== Coach and founder ===
Laughlin started coaching in the early 1970s at the U.S. Merchant Marine Academy in Kings Point, New York. His coaching of college and club teams produced 24 national champions. He then founded the Total Immersion swim program in 1989 to work with what he termed “adult-onset swimmers,” who took up the sport in adulthood, often as triathletes with little swimming experience.

His teaching emphasized efficiency in the water through balance, streamlining, drag reduction and energy conservation. He targeted Masters swimmers and triathletes, stressing the benefits of finishing the swimming leg of competition with a low heart rate. Many coaches of age group, collegiate and elite swimmers adopted his approach.

=== Author and producer ===
Laughlin's first book, “Total Immersion: The Revolutionary Way to Swim Better, Faster and Easier,” was published in 1996 by Simon & Schuster, and has sold more than 275,000 copies as an e-book and trade paperback.

Trainer Christopher Drozd described the book as "gold" in a review at SportFit.com, "Just as there is more to weightlifting than pushing some iron from point A to point B, swimming is a subtle and complex endeavor. A potentially dry (no pun intended) subject – learning to swim – becomes an entertaining journey through hydrodynamics and physics.

Laughlin also wrote "Extraordinary Swimming For Every Body - a Total Immersion Instructional," "Triathlon Swimming Made Easy: The Total Immersion Way for Anyone to Master Open-Water Swimming,” "Swimming Made Easy: The Total Immersion Way for Any Swimmer to Achieve Fluency, Ease, and Speed in Any Stroke" and "Swimming Made Easy.”

He also produced numerous instructional videos, swimming in many of them. His most popular video, "Total Immersion Freestyle Swimming Demonstration,” has accumulated more than 2.2 million YouTube views.

"He was on a mission to change how swimming was taught all over the globe – the business was a byproduct of that passion. Terry stood tall in stature and influence, and to some he appeared larger than life. But those who knew him well were struck by his child-like curiosity about the world, and the optimism with which he confronted life’s challenges and rewards," wrote Laughlin's friend and business associate Keith Woodburn.

== Death ==
Before prostate cancer claimed him at age 66, Laughlin was swimming better than ever before, winning championships and setting records. According to his blog, he completed a Corsica-to-Sardinia swim of nearly ten miles in four hours, 31 minutes, with two friends in 2015.

“After living with metastatic prostate cancer for two years (about which he blogged widely), Terry died on Friday, October 20th, 2017, of complications related to his condition. He displayed his characteristic optimism, wit, and passion for life—and swimming—until the very end," wrote his wife Alice and daughters Fiona, Carrie and Betsy, in a news release carried by slowtwitch.com.

Following his death, The Economist wrote that Terry Laughlin's Total Immersion "has become a bestselling book, a much-watched series of videos, a coaching business and a catchphrase among hydrophiles the world over. It turned even the most timid novices into smooth, confident strokemakers, and honed the technique of champions."

== Legacy ==
Laughlin's Total Immersion clinics taught thousands of swimmers and certified hundreds of instructors to run their own clinics, spreading the discipline globally. His wife, Alice, who founded Total Immersion with him, said there are more than 350 certified Total Immersion instructors operating in more than 30 countries as of 2017.

Laughlin coached across the United States and internationally, including in Thailand and the Caribbean. In addition to training national-level swimmers and triathletes, he specialized in teaching swimming to adults of all ages, including those who had never previously learned to swim.

While he improved swimming for thousands, Laughlin also paused to focus the individual. "He never dismissed an honest inquiry with a curt response and would spend hours each day returning emails," wrote his longtime Master's Swimming lane mate David Barra. "Terry always sought new ways to quantify and communicate the relationship between effort and efficiency in terms accessible to the novice and expert alike. He did so with a contagious enthusiasm."

== Publications ==
- Laughlin, Terry; John Delves (2004). Total Immersion: The Revolutionary Way To Swim Better, Faster, and Easier. Fireside. ISBN 0-7432-5343-4.
- Laughlin, Terry (2004). Triathlon Swimming Made Easy: The Total Immersion Way for Anyone to Master Open-Water Swimming. Total Immersion Inc. ISBN 1-931009-07-4.
- Laughlin, Terry (2001). Swimming Made Easy: The Total Immersion Way for Any Swimmer to Achieve Fluency, Ease, and Speed in Any Stroke. Total Immersion Inc. ISBN 1-931009-01-5.
