= Caroline Doggart =

Economist

Caroline Elizabeth Doggart (born 1939) is a development economist and author.

Born in Utrecht, in the Netherlands, and educated at Girton College, Cambridge and Imperial College London, she began her career at the Economist Intelligence Unit. In 1970, she wrote Tax Havens and their Uses. The publication went on to become the Economist Group's bestselling publication, with 11 editions until 2005, translated into five languages. Reviewers described the book as "magisterial," "encyclopaedic," and a "classic."

Doggart has worked as a senior development economist for the World Bank in Malawi, Tanzania, Ghana, Ecuador, Botswana, Haiti, the Maldive Islands and Paraguay. In 1996, she wrote an influential article, From Reconstruction to Development in Europe and Japan.

Doggart is a board member of the Maria Montessori Training Organisation, a founder of the ICEA (International Consulting Economists' Association), and a director of the Pestalozzi Overseas Children's Trust.

She has contributed to The Financial Times, The Independent and The Economist.
