= James Hamilton Doggart =

English ophthalmologist and cricketer (1900–1989)

James Doggart in his surgery

James Hamilton Doggart (22 January 1900 – 15 October 1989) was an English ophthalmologist, lecturer, writer, cricketer, and a member of the Cambridge Apostles and the Bloomsbury Group.

== Early life ==
Doggart was born exactly one year before the death of Queen Victoria. Remembering his childhood, he wrote:

Motor cars were rare, slow and often out of action, so that we had plenty of scope for spinning-tops, games with marbles and cherry-stones, tipcat, and a bowler and hoop... Riding on a milk cart was a special treat. One stood up beside the driver, behind those jangling, swinging cans, out of which the driver would ladle measures of milk. (Reflections in a Family Mirror, Red House, 2002)

== First World War ==
Doggart's first year at King's College, Cambridge was spent in the shadow of war, helped him to learn that lesson. When he went up to read medicine at King's in 1917, many of the young men who would have become his friends were dying in the trenches. Most of the dons who would have taught him were in Whitehall. There were only ten undergraduates at King's that year, including a seriously wounded soldier, two choral scholars, and two visiting students from India and China.

He filled the grim emptiness by throwing himself into his medical studies. He sailed through chemistry, physics, biology, anatomy and physiology, and finished two years of medical studies in one. In May 1918, he persuaded the Admiralty to accept him as a surgeon-probationer and began his first job in medicine, as an anaesthetist. There were no antibiotics or blood transfusions. The only anaesthetics available were chloroform and ether. His notes from the period express particular distress at wounds involving the knee-joint, and the regularity of gangrene-induced amputations.

The quality of James's work earned him a transfer to HMS Sikh, a newly built destroyer. Its mission was to escort troopships across the Channel, and to carry out anti-submarine patrols. James's medical duties were limited to treating engine-room artificers for burns and distributing medicines for venereal diseases. His literary abilities were exploited with the job of keeping code systems and other confidential books up to date, and with the unenviable task of censoring letters.

If he was lucky to escape a German submarine attack in the Channel, he was even more fortunate to survive influenza, contracted while on leave in Cambridge. This was no normal 'flu bug, but a pandemic that swept the world. It would claim more lives than World War One itself. In hospital, James saw young men who had survived the Somme killed by influenza. Thanks to a kindly nurse who gave him extra quantities of castor oil, James recovered within a month, just in time to celebrate the Armistice declaration.

== Cambridge and the Apostles ==
Doggart returned to King's, sharing rooms with his brother Graham Doggart, and went to university:

1919 was a most exciting time to be in Cambridge. Undergraduates of mixed ages poured in. A few had gone up in 1913, joining the Forces at the outbreak of the War... John Maynard Keynes resigned from the Treasury, violently disapproving of Lloyd George's policies at the Versailles Peace Conference, and got back to King’s for the May term of 1919... The Fox-trot, the One-step and the Waltz dominated the dancing world, and the girls of Girton and Newnham, duly chaperoned in those conventional times, were ardently courted... There were the Pitt Club, the Hawks, the Footlights and a host of friends at King’s and in other colleges, and games of rugger. I did very little solid work, and of course I fell in love. (ibid, 2002)

It was in Keynes' rooms at King's where friend and writer Peter Lucas introduced James to a secret society known as the Apostles. Founded in 1829, this elite group of intellectual Jedis boasted Alfred Tennyson and Rupert Brooke amongst its past members. During James's association, fellow Apostles included philosophers Bertrand Russell and Ludwig Wittgenstein, writer Lytton Strachey, Soviet spies Anthony Blunt and Guy Burgess, novelist E.M. Forster and future Provosts of King's Jack Sheppard and Noel Annan. Members took it in turns to read a paper on a philosophical or academic issue, which became the basis for lively debates. James forged some of his closest friendships among the Apostles, who brought him into contact with leading lights of the Bloomsbury group, such as Virginia Woolf, Duncan Grant and Dora Carrington. His correspondence with Forster, Carrington and Strachey remained vigorous and affectionate until their deaths. "Even my well-known cynicism", Strachey wrote in a 1920 letter, "melts away under your benevolent beams, and I’ve hardly a jibe left". (ibid, 2002)

James's intellectual and personal adventures deepened his love for Cambridge and, specifically, King's College—the evening light on the Cam; the naked opening note of Once in Royal David's City; January snow on the crown of Henry VI's statue. King's became the place he cherished the most for the rest of his life.

== Early medical career ==
James's appreciation of hard-won success grew out of his own experience with failure. Perhaps his bitterest setbacks were suffered in his medical training after leaving Cambridge in July 1920. He failed papers on medicine, surgery and midwifery on three increasingly painful occasions. After those intellectual body-blows, many people would have abandoned a medical career, but he persevered and eventually prevailed.

Indeed, the exam failures prompted him to take a careful look at what direction he wanted his career to take, and led him to find his real vocation: eye work. In February 1923, he landed a job as an ophthalmic house surgeon and embarked on a further round of studies.

His commitment to medicine was strengthened by a six-month stint as a casualty officer at the Royal Northern Hospital:

There were all manner of injuries, ranging from people brought in dead from a motor crash, down to the cuts and bruises. On one day in February 1926 I treated seventeen people for fractures sustained in toboganing on Hampstead Heath and in Kenwood. There are few sensations more satisfactory, I think, than the slide of the head of the humerus back into its socket when one reduces a dislocated shoulder. (ibid, 2002)

His self-belief was tested again in May 1927, when he failed his preliminary exams to qualify as an ophthalmic surgeon. He resumed preparations, took the exams, and failed again.

"This was very discouraging", he wrote, "because I was no further on. The people teaching the course had all expected me to get through". (ibid, 2002)

He struggled on and, in December 1928, passed the Final Fellowship exam:

I could have let out a yell of joy and relief. The formal words of welcome were pronounced by Sir Cuthbert Wallace who, as Dean of the Medical School of St. Thomas', had rebuked me a few years earlier for being so frivolous as to go off to South America before I had qualified. (ibid, 2002)

In fact, that trip was not only James's first journey outside Europe; it led to his first significant contribution to medical research. The adventure came about when the eminent scientist Joseph Barcroft invited him to join an Anglo-American expedition to Peru to study the physiology of mountain sickness. The group sailed from Liverpool in November 1921, and stopped off at Havana, before passing through the Panama Canal on the way to the Peruvian port of Callao. In Peru, they spent the entire winter, huddled in a converted railway baggage car at Cerro de Pasco, 14,000 feet above sea level. James was entranced by South America, where he returned to lecture on various occasions.

James's love of travel started with childhood seaside holidays in the north of England, the pierrot troupe on Saltburn beach remembered with particular pleasure. He loved Scotland, where his daughter Sonia would spend much of her life:

An enchanting land, offering hills to climb, burns to cross, glorious scones, cookies and cinnamon balls and of course boats, especially the kinds that you could propel standing up, by means of a single oar resting on a concave notch in the stern. (ibid, 2002)

A lecture tour to the Soviet Union in 1957 with his lifelong friend Patrick Trevor-Roper yielded new adventures.

Throughout his life, James was an enthusiastic sportsman. During the First World War, he sought out edelweiss-rare rugger matches. Between the wars, he rock-climbed, skated, and played golf. He played cricket for Cambridge University and for St Thomas's Hospital, where his fast right arm led the team to two successive victories in the inter-hospital Cup Final.

== Personal life ==
James was a romantic in the field of love as well as travel. His writings refer to his impulsiveness and suggest that, like Odysseus under the spell of the Sirens, he was bewitched by beautiful women – especially the dangerous ones—throughout his youth. At age five, while attending Westholm School for Girls:

I felt the first pangs of love, especially for the three fascinating Errington sisters, one word from any of whom would produce an ecstasy of tongue-tied blushes. (ibid, 2002)

At Cambridge, he attracted much female attention. Virginia Woolf describes him affectionately in her diaries as a "spruce innocent young man; with eyes like brown trout streams". (The Diary of Virginia Woolf, Volume 2 1920–24, Penguin, 1981, p. 8)

James Doggart during World War II

In 1919, James became romantically involved with a girl at Newnham, but the engagement was short-lived: the attractions of a single life were still too great. In Montreal, he wrote: "I was astonished at the glorious complexions of all the girls in that cold crisp air". A year later, at the Downside Ball in London: "all the girls were beautiful and walked like panthers".

In 1925, he began a flirtatious correspondence with Dora Carrington which lasted six years. He became engaged for the second time, to a girl whom he had met at a dance in Leicester. He temporarily abandoned his studies for her because, as he explains: "being in a hurry to get married, I did not like the prospect of examinations looming up at me". He broke off the relationship.

Little is known about his first marriage. His writings allude only to the bare facts. In 1928, he met Doris Mennell, (Jan 10, 1908 - Jul 29, 1977) and married her the following year. They had one daughter, Sonia. They separated in 1931, and the marriage was formally dissolved in 1938.

James met the love of his life, Leonora Sharpley, in October 1936. They were introduced at a dinner party hosted by Sebastian and Honor Earl, the niece of one of their favourite writers, Somerset Maugham. 'Leo' was an elegant lady with an aquiline nose, a mellifluous voice, and a seraphic lightness of movement. She was born in Lincoln in 1904. Her father, George Sharpley, was a stern, devout man who ran a heavy engineering business and was also High Sheriff of Lincoln. Leo grew up with two sisters, to whom she was close. After leaving school, she went to art college in London. She met and married a theatre impresario, Jack Gatti, with whom she had two fiercely independent sons, John and Peter. Jack found the starlets appearing in his theatre irresistible. The marriage collapsed.

When they first met, Leo and James were both emerging from painful divorces. About a year later, James proposed to Leo, and she accepted. The couple were married in London on 7 May 1938. James's marriage was the bedrock on which he built his successful career. His gaze ceased wandering to pretty nurses and focused instead on using medicine to make a real difference to the world.

== Second World War ==
His first big challenge came soon after his wedding, with the outbreak of the Second World War. He negotiated a posting as a Wing Commander in the RAF Medical Branch in Blackpool. Surrounded by some 30,000 airmen, he soon found himself testing the eyesight of up to 100 men a day. Over the next five years, the Central Medical Establishment sent him to hospitals and camps in Wales, Buckinghamshire, Hereford, Gloucester and London. He treated scores of airmen who returned from bombing raids over continental Europe with eye injuries. He saved the sight of many.

== Work ==
Near the end of the war, James began work on a pioneering book on childhood eye diseases. It was the start of the most productive period of his career. The book was published in 1947 and became a core textbook in the field. He followed it up with a companion book, Children’s eye nursing, and then, in 1949, with two other books – Ophthalmic Medicine and Ocular Signs in Slit-Lamp Microscopy.

These publications turned him into a leading player in the world of ophthalmology. His workload mushroomed, and he found himself juggling all kinds of responsibilities. He ran between consultancy appointments at Moorfields, St George's and Great Ormond Street hospitals, and still managed to find time to serve a growing private practice. He presided over the Faculty of Ophthalmology and sat on a host of other medical committees. He wrote numerous papers for medical journals and became an editor of the British Journal of Ophthalmology. He was a highly sought-after lecturer on the international circuit and a patient teacher at various hospitals. He even pushed ophthalmology into the political field, lobbying parliament to outlaw boxing because of the eye damage it causes.

James's career spanned a period of enormous advances in medical technology, from the development of antibiotics to the introduction of laser surgery. He played a part in this progress through his own teaching and research work, and by spearheading a new means of advancing medical knowledge – global networking. At conferences, through exchange programs, by written correspondence, and as a member of the Order of the Knights of St. John, James forged links between doctors and eye specialists around the world – from the Soviet Union to Australia, Argentina to the United States. He created an informal World Wide Web for medical research.

== Family ==
James Doggart with his wife Leonora and son Tony

Leo gave birth to her and James's only child, Anthony Hamilton Doggart, in 1940, and moved to a cottage near Marlborough, safely tucked away from German bombs. Or so she thought. On her way to visit James in Blackpool, she was caught in an unexpected air raid in Cheltenham. The bomb just missed her railway carriage. Fire raged around her. She calmly picked up her bags and headed straight for the house of Drummond Currie, James's dissecting partner from his Cambridge days. She helped Mrs Currie make tea and successfully completed her journey to Blackpool the following day.

Leo missed her husband's company and found a house in Wendover, near his airbase at RAF Halton. She made the move in a small Austin car, with a chicken house on a trailer. In those years of scarcity, the chickens were a major asset, ensuring that Tony had a regular supply of soft-boiled eggs.

James was similarly enterprising as a parent. He once arranged an aircraft trip to St. Eval, near to where his daughter Sonia's school had been evacuated, and paid her a surprise visit. In 1943, he cleverly purchased a large house in Cambridge called Binsted, on the site of what is now Robinson College. He, Leo and Tony moved in during the summer of 1946, and Binsted became their first stable home.

Leo and James's roots became increasingly intertwined as shared friendships strengthened. James's university friend Jack Sheppard became Provost of King's and they saw a lot of each other. Leo's Sunday lunch parties (and her Queen's Pudding) became famous, and invitations were eagerly accepted. Some of their closest friends were Noel and Gaby Annan, Tim Munby, Patrick Wilkinson and the man whom James called "the best man-friend I ever had, and the wisest man I ever knew" – his brother Graham Doggart. Leo loved laughing and gossiping with her friends, the closest of whom were Nora David, who later spoke for Labour on education in the House of Lords, and Joyce Carey, the actress at the centre of Noël Coward's circle.

James's work required him to spend weekdays in London where he spent many evenings with friends at the Garrick Club. A painting still hangs there, depicting a trip by Garrick members to the Derby. James is portrayed rapt in conversation with a colourfully dressed gypsy woman. More interested in the mythic than the mundane, he seems unaware that a smudge-faced child, possibly the son of the gypsy, is sneaking his little hand into his pocket.

== Later years ==
In 1962, Leo and James sold Binsted and moved to a townhouse off Kensington Church Street. In 1970, they moved to Albury Park, a stately Victorian retirement home in Surrey. It featured palatial gravel paths and rose gardens, a Saxon chapel, and a terrace designed in the 17th century by John Evelyn. Here, they devoted great energies to educating and entertaining their two grandchildren, Sebastian Doggart and Nike Doggart.

Some of James's closest friends were writers he had never met. Perhaps his closest friend of all was Homer, in whose tales of nobility and adventure he found a kindred spirit. As an undergraduate, he read the Iliad in Greek on the banks of the Cam. The classics provided an escape from the realities of the Second World War:

I was spending two and a half hours in the train six days a week, practically all that time reading Homer and other Greek authors. (ibid, 2002)

James and Leo shared many literary 'friends', including Jane Austen, Somerset Maugham, Rudyard Kipling and the Brontë sisters. James would often read these authors aloud to Leo, who listened intently as she embroidered exotic parrots on cushion covers. As in all good couples, they had their private friends. James favoured Aristophanes, Thucydides, and Plato; Leo had weaknesses for Barbara Cartland and Nigel Dempster. James had rather more literary enemies, especially D. H. Lawrence, whom he slammed as vulgar and amoral, and urged others never to read.

James had a hard time growing old. Moving from a hectic career into retirement was a tough task. He set about creating projects to fill the time. He combined his literary and charitable energies into reading books onto cassettes for the blind. He approached this as a craft, taking speaking lessons so that his recordings flowed freely. His listeners, attached to the charity Calibre, rewarded him with a steady stream of fan mail, appreciative of his performances as Mr. Darcy or Charles Strickland.

Deep down, old age infuriated him. He was mindful of his cherished friend Somerset Maugham's last words that "dying is a very dull dreary affair and my advice to you is to have nothing whatsoever to do with it". The deterioration in his eyesight – the very gift he had devoted his life to preserving for other people—forced him to stop reading for the blind. That was a cruel sleight of fate. His depression became clearer with every passing year. His face lit up when he saw his children or grandchildren. His family was his only Prozac, and, unlike Leo, he did not have religion to lean on.

James's Christianity had been destroyed at the age of seven, when his father subjected him to Total Immersion. His rejection of his father's Baptist beliefs became a source of inner turmoil throughout his life. On the one hand, he disagreed with what he saw as his father's religious intolerance and blinkered piety; on the other, he was mindful of his filial duties:

My father would have swooned for joy if I had decided to be a medical missionary, but alas, it is impossible to turn these things like a tap, just to oblige another, even if that other is owed an enormous debt of gratitude. (ibid, 2002)

Although he found no truth in organized religion, he did find God's hand in both nature and mankind. Sitting alone in a box at the Royal Festival Hall, he found God listening to Fritz Kreisler playing the violin. He found Him in the first crocuses of springtime and looking through a microscope at a child's retina. He found him in the echo of Homer's "rosy-fingered dawn". And he found Him, infinitely, in the fanned vaulting of King's Chapel.

James Doggart died on 15 October 1989, aged 89 years, 266 days.
