= José Triana (poet) =

Cuban poet and playwright (1931–2018)

José Triana (4 January 1931 – 4 March 2018) was a Cuban poet and playwright.

== Life and career ==
Born in Hatuey, Camagüey Province on 4 January 1931, Triana attended the University of Oriente. He moved to Spain in 1954, where he began his career as a playwright. While in Spain, Triana studied at the University of Madrid and theatre with José Franco. Triana later joined the troupe Grupo Didi, and worked as a scenic artist for Teatro Ensayo. Most his early plays were inspired by Greek tragedy. Triana wrote his first play, The Major General Will Speak of Theogony, in 1957, and began work on his best known play Night of the Assassins later that year. After Fidel Castro took power in 1959, Triana returned to Cuba. In 1960, Triana's Medea in the Mirror was produced at the Prometeo Theatre. The following year, Triana joined the National Union of Writers and Artists of Cuba as a founding member.

In 1965, he was awarded the Casa de las Américas Prize for Night of the Assassins, which he had rewritten earlier that year. The rewritten play won El Gallo of Havana Prize in 1966. International attention resulting from the awards caused supporters of the Cuban Revolution to turn against Triana and his work. He married Chantal Chilhaud-Dumaine (daughter of Jacques Chilhaud-Dumaine, Ambassador of France to Portugal) in 1968. Triana and his wife were exiled to France in 1980. In France, Triana adapted Respectable Women, a novel by Miguel de Carrión, into the play Dialogue for Women, eventually retitled Common Words, an homage to the play Divine Words, written by Ramón del Valle-Inclán. He died on 4 March 2018, in Paris, aged 87.
