= Hubert Doggart =

English cricketer (1925–2018)

Personal information
- Full name: George Hubert Graham Doggart
- Born: 18 July 1925; Earl's Court, London, England
- Died: 16 February 2018 (aged 92); Chichester, West Sussex, England
- Batting: Right-handed
- Bowling: Right-arm off break

International information
- National side: England
- Test debut: 8 June 1950 v West Indies
- Last Test: 24 June 1950 v West Indies

Domestic team information
- Years: Team
- 1948–1950: Cambridge University
- 1948–1961: Sussex

Career statistics
Competition	Test	First-class
Matches	2	210
Runs scored	76	10,054
Batting average	19.00	31.51
100s/50s	0/0	20/50
Top score	29	219*
Balls bowled	–	4,412
Wickets	–	60
Bowling average	–	34.28
5 wickets in innings	–	0
10 wickets in match	–	0
Best bowling	–	4/50
Catches/stumpings	3/–	199/–
- Source: ESPNcricinfo, 6 November 2022

George Hubert Graham Doggart OBE (18 July 1925 – 16 February 2018) was an English sports administrator, first-class cricketer and schoolmaster.

== Background ==
Doggart was born into a sporting family at Earl's Court, London, the elder son of the sportsman Graham Doggart. He was educated at Winchester College where he was captain of cricket and football. On leaving school he was commissioned in the Coldstream Guards. He then went up to King's College, Cambridge where he graduated with a Master of Arts degree.

== Sporting career ==
He was a Cambridge blue in five different sports (cricket, football, rackets, squash and Rugby fives) and captain in four and was a successful amateur cricketer for Cambridge University and Sussex (where he was captain in 1954). He made an unbeaten 215 against Lancashire on his Cambridge University debut in 1948 and this score remains the highest made by a debutant in English cricket. He represented England in two Test matches versus the West Indies in 1950 (at Old Trafford and Lord's). Teaching commitments meant that he only played one full summer of county cricket, in 1954.

He later held several offices in sports administration, such as President of the Marylebone Cricket Club (MCC) (1981–1982), the Cricket Council (1981–1982), the English Schools Cricket Association (1965–2000) and the Cricket Society (1983–1998). He also chaired the ICC (1981–1982) and the Friends of Arundel Castle Cricket Club (1993–2003).

== Personal life ==
He taught at Winchester College from 1950 to 1972 and was headmaster at King's School, Bruton from 1972 to 1985. Doggart died peacefully at his Chichester home on 16 February 2018 aged 92. He left a widow, Susan, whom he married in 1960. They had a son and two daughters.

His son, Simon Doggart, was found by the Church of England Makin Review (18 October 2024) to have been actively involved in the abuse carried out by John Smyth, aiding and abetting it, noting that by 1982 Doggart "began to be actively involved and carrying out abuse unassisted by John Smyth" (see paragraph 12.1.14). Following publication of the Makin Review, Justin Welby announced his intention to resign as Archbishop of Canterbury.

It is clear from the Makin Review, and the earlier investigations by Winchester College, that Hubert Doggart was fully informed in late 1982 about his son and John Smyth's activities.

Sporting positions
Preceded by Peter May	MCC President; 1981-1982	Succeeded by Sir Anthony Tuke
Preceded by David Sheppard	Sussex county cricket captain 1954	Succeeded by Robin Marlar
