= Graham Doggart =

Football and cricket player and administrator

Alexander Graham Doggart, JP (2 June 1897 – 7 June 1963) was an English administrator, first-class cricketer, footballer and magistrate.

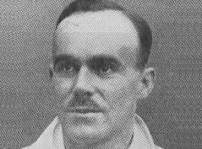

Doggart was born in Bishop Auckland, County Durham. He was educated at Darlington Grammar School and Bishop's Stortford College, an independent school in the historic market town of Bishop's Stortford in Hertfordshire, followed by King's College, Cambridge. He saw active service in the Army during the First World War, before going to university.

He played cricket as a right-handed batsman and a right-arm medium fast bowler for Cambridge University (1919–1922) (where he was awarded a "Blue" in 1921 and 1922), Durham in 1924 and Middlesex in 1925.

He was a useful footballer as an inside-forward. He appeared in the Cambridge football XI in 1920 and 1921, gained a full international cap for England, captaining the team versus Belgium on 1 November 1923, and took part in four Amateur Internationals. He was a leading forward for the Corinthians, scoring the goal by which they defeated Blackburn Rovers in Round 1 of the FA Cup in January 1924. He also represented Bishop Auckland F.C. and the Casuals F.C. He played for the "Amateurs" in the 1929 FA Charity Shield. He played twice for Darlington in the 1921–22 Football League.

He was a committee member of Sussex County Cricket Club and of the full M.C.C. Committee. He was also a successful football administrator and served as the Chairman of the F.A. from 1961 to 1963. He died suddenly while chairing the annual meeting of the Football Association at Lancaster Gate, Bayswater. He was 66.

His brother Jimmy Doggart became a distinguished ophthalmologist and his eldest son Hubert Doggart became a successful cricketer, administrator and schoolmaster.
