= Peter Doggart =

English cricketer

Arthur Peter Doggart (3 December 1927 – 17 March 1965) was an English cricketer active from 1947 to 1951 who played for Sussex.

Peter Doggart was born in Earl's Court and died in Woodcote, Epsom. He had killed himself by overdosing on barbiturates. He appeared in nine first-class matches as a righthanded batsman who bowled right arm medium pace. He scored 228 runs with a highest score of 43 and took two wickets with a best performance of two for 8.
