= Whiplash (The Knick) =

- The Knick episode
- Episode no.: Season 2 Episode 5
- Directed by: Steven Soderbergh
- Written by: Steven Katz
- Cinematography by: Peter Andrews (Note: Pseudonym for Steven Soderbergh.)
- Editing by: Mary Ann Bernard
- Original release date: November 13, 2015
- Running time: 57 minutes

Guest appearances
- Linda Emond as Anne Chickering; Jennifer Ferrin as Abigail Alford; Gibson Frazier as Harold Prettyman; Arielle Goldman as Genevieve Everidge; Emily Kinney as Nurse Daisy Ryan; Ntare Mwine as D.W. Garrison Carr; Molly Price as Effie Barrow; Anthony Rapp as Dr. Thurman Drexler; Reg Rogers as Dr. Bertram Chickering, Sr.; Perry Yung as Ping Wu; Lily Brahms as Clara Chickering; Phil Burke as Doctor; Dara Coleman as Ambulance Driver; Lizzy DeClement as Young Girl; Colman Domingo as Dr. Russell Daniels; Ylfa Edelstein as Nurse Baker; John Treacy Egan as Detective Satterlee; Brian Faherty as Fire Chief Croker; Caitlin Kinnunen as Suzy; Thomas Kopache as Samuel Reid; Ying Ying Li as Lin-Lin; Wade McCollum as Sidney Carton; Aedin Moloney as Sister Mary Michael; John O'Creagh as Tammany Hall Official; Lucas Papaelias as Eldon Pouncey; Dorian Scarfi as Moisha; Zuzanna Szadkowski as Nurse Pell; Dwayne Alistair Thomas as Bartender; David Townsend as Mr. Stern; Chandler Williams as Nelson Epps

Episode chronology
← Previous "Wonderful Surprises"	Next → "There Are Rules"

"Whiplash" is the fifth episode of the second season of the American medical period drama television series The Knick. It is the 15th overall episode of the series and was written by Steven Katz, and directed by executive producer Steven Soderbergh. It originally aired on Cinemax on November 13, 2015.

The series is set in New York City in the early twentieth century and follows the staff of the Knickerbocker Hospital (the Knick), who struggle against the limitations of medical understanding and practice. The protagonist is Dr. John Thackery, the new leader of the surgery staff, who balances his cocaine and opium addictions against his ambition for medical discovery and his reputation among his peers. In the episode, Thackery continues researching for a cure on addiction, while Chickering feels pressured in saving his mother.

According to Nielsen Media Research, the episode was seen by an estimated 0.255 million household viewers and gained a 0.06 ratings share among adults aged 18–49. The episode received generally positive reviews from critics, who praised the performances, although some criticized the writing and lack of progress.

== Plot ==
Thackery (Clive Owen) uses a morphine addicted patient for a demonstration before the spectators. He displays electrical stimulation in the patient's brain, explaining that the brain will be crucial in isolating the addiction.

An explosion occurs in Park Avenue with multiple victims. This forces Thackery, Gallinger (Eric Johnson) and Edwards (André Holland) to treat many patients at the same time, while Elkins (Eve Hewson) helps them by assisting in a triage. Due to the explosion, Henry (Charles Aitken) informs Barrow (Jeremy Bobb) that the Knick will waive the costs for the victims due to a prior investment in the subway where the explosion took place. Nevertheless, Henry is hiding the investment from August (Grainger Hines).

Sister Harriet (Cara Seymour) now lives in a convent, but she is given lower benefits than other nuns due to her actions. She is also forced to perform more duties while also facing starvation. Barrow is seduced by his wife Effie (Molly Price) but he decides to leave her. He then meets with Ping Wu (Perry Yung), paying him to get Junia (Rachel Korine) out of her duties at the brothel. He also sees a realtor to consider buying an apartment for him and Junia.

Chickering (Michael Angarano) continues researching for his mother Anne (Linda Emond), receiving help from Edwards, who supplies him with papers by Pierre Curie to help him. He continues seeing Genevieve (Arielle Goldman), who accompanies him to dine with his family. The dinner proves to be an enjoyable evening for the family, taking a liking on Genevieve. Anne confides in Genevieve that she is unsure on how her family will live without her. After spending time in the hospital, Henry and Elkins go dining, where they share a kiss.

Cornelia (Juliet Rylance) continues investigating Speight's death, eventually finding that he was investigating an immigrant who contracted bubonic plague. Still angry over his wife's harassment, Gallinger decides to perform sterilization on a group of boys, under the supervision of a superintendent who considers them to be mentally defective.

== Production ==
=== Development ===
In October 2015, Cinemax announced that the fifth episode of the season would be titled "Whiplash", and that it would be written by Steven Katz, and directed by executive producer Steven Soderbergh. This was Katz's third writing credit, and Soderbergh's 15th directing credit.

== Reception ==
=== Viewers ===
In its original American broadcast, "Wonderful Surprises" was seen by an estimated 0.255 million household viewers with a 0.06 in the 18-49 demographics. This means that 0.03 percent of all households with televisions watched the episode. This was a 53% increase in viewership from the previous episode, which was watched by an estimated 0.166 million household viewers with a 0.03 in the 18-49 demographics.

=== Critical reviews ===
"Whiplash" received generally positive reviews from critics. The review aggregator website Rotten Tomatoes reported an 80% approval rating for the episode, based on 10 reviews. The site's consensus states: "'Whiplash' deepens and develops character relationships while giving The Knick's overall arc a welcome narrative jolt."

Brandon Nowalk of The A.V. Club gave the episode a "C" grade and wrote, "The biggest thing that happens in 'Whiplash' is Barrow paying off his debt, and even that goes pretty much exactly how you’d expect. Where's the surprise? Where's the conflict? Where are the sparks? At this point in the first season, on top of the shock of the new, The Knick had delivered that impressionistic Algie fight scene. Season two has its showcase moments, like Algie's aborted eye surgery and Elkins' first sermon, but it's tough to show off visually when there's so little on the page." Rodrigo Perez of IndieWire wrote, "It's a bit of a building block episode really, which is the nature of television, chapters unfold building to something much bigger, but the triage in the Knick does make for some arresting sequences and overall it feels like the lull before the storm."

Sarene Leeds of Entertainment Weekly wrote, "One relationship that is thriving beautifully, without the need of games or intrigue, is the one between Dr. Bertie Chickering and the intrepid journalist Genevieve Everidge." Ivy Pochoda of Vulture gave the episode a perfect 5 star rating out of 5 and wrote, "While it appears that love might be instrumental in inspiring Algie to consider deeper and more profound issues, the same can't be said for poor Barrow, who always escapes one pickle just to fall into another."

Mike Hale of The New York Times wrote, "If the small staff of the Knickerbocker Hospital has its way, there won't be any diseases left for us to worry about a century later. In Friday night’s episode of The Knick alone, John Thackery was zeroing in on the causes of addiction while the former (and presumably future) Knick surgeon Bertie Chickering was about to use radiation to treat his mother's cancer." Steve MacFarlane of Slant Magazine wrote, "Anyone who had an allergic reaction to the hokey old-flame subplot between Abigail Alford and John Thackery in The Knick's first season will be let down by the opener of 'Whiplash,' which offers yet another meandering push-and-pull conversation between them, this time about how much care Abigail needs in recovering from her syphilis treatment."

Alec Bojalad of Den of Geek a 3.5 star rating out of 5 and wrote, "The title 'Whiplash', however, lampshades everything in far too meta and annoying of a way. Audiences should be allowed to make these kind of thematic connections for themselves, not have the title of episodes spell them out for us. It's strange, we so rarely think about the quality of the actual individual titles of episodes of television. And the way I viewed 'Whiplash' without knowing the title and then finding out, negatively affected my experience." Shane Ryan of Paste wrote, "With The Knick, the producers are desperate to embrace so many social and technological changes of the times that they are hampering what could be a masterpiece of a series. Maybe by Season Three, they can bring in some fresh writers to help focus the show. Until then, we'll be stumbling along to the finish line of this run of episodes, gritting our teeth through it all."
