= The Best with the Best to Get the Best =

- The Knick episode
- Episode no.: Season 2 Episode 3
- Directed by: Steven Soderbergh
- Written by: Jack Amiel; Michael Begler
- Cinematography by: Peter Andrews (Note: Pseudonym for Steven Soderbergh.)
- Editing by: Mary Ann Bernard
- Original release date: October 30, 2015
- Running time: 57 minutes

Guest appearances
- Phil Burke as Doctor; Will Brill as Leo Guggenheim; Michael Cumpsty as Judge Parkinson Bothamly; Jennifer Ferrin as Abigail Alford; Gibson Frazier as Harold Prettyman; Arielle Goldman as Genevieve Everidge; Andrew Rannells as Frazier H. Wingo; Anthony Rapp as Dr. Thurman Drexler; Stephen Spinella as A.D. Elkins; Happy Anderson as Jimmy; Annabelle Attanasio as Dorothy Walcott; Jason Babinsky as Mt. Sinai Doctor; Jarlath Conroy as Hypnotist; Gia Crovatin as Clara Horner; Ylfa Edelstein as Nurse Baker; Miranda Gruss as Zoya; Rebecca Gruss as Nika; Sydney Hollis as Bailiff; David Kubicka as Griscom; Ben Livingston as Dr. William H. Mays; Kate MacCluggage as Mary; Jerry Miller as Cromartie Orderly; Ciarán O'Reilly as Priest; Lucas Papaelias as Eldon Pouncey; Alexandra Roxo as Cate; David Sedgwick as Mr. Horner; Zuzanna Szadkowski as Nurse Pell; Mitchell Vallen as Otto; Gillian Williams as Henny

Episode chronology
← Previous "You're No Rose"	Next → "Wonderful Surprises"

"The Best with the Best to Get the Best" is the third episode of the second season of the American medical period drama television series The Knick. It is the 13th overall episode of the series and was written by series creators Jack Amiel and Michael Begler, and directed by executive producer Steven Soderbergh. It originally aired on Cinemax on October 30, 2015.

The series is set in New York City in the early twentieth century and follows the staff of the Knickerbocker Hospital (the Knick), who struggle against the limitations of medical understanding and practice. The protagonist is Dr. John Thackery, the new leader of the surgery staff, who balances his cocaine and opium addictions against his ambition for medical discovery and his reputation among his peers. In the episode, Thackery decides to experiment after meeting Abigail again, while Chickering starts working at Mt. Sinai.

According to Nielsen Media Research, the episode was seen by an estimated 0.202 million household viewers and gained a 0.05 ratings share among adults aged 18–49. The episode received extremely positive reviews from critics, who praised the character development, performances and ending.

== Plot ==
Chickering (Michael Angarano) starts working at Mt. Sinai, although he is taken aback by the practices employed by Dr. Zinberg (Michael Nathanson). He meets Genevieve Everidge (Arielle Goldman), a journalist visiting the hospital and becomes smitten with her. She reveals that she went undercover at a mental institution to expose its corruption and poor conditions, while also hiding her Jewish status.

Thackery (Clive Owen) continues using cocaine. One night, he runs into Abigail (Jennifer Ferrin). Even though she has a reconstructed nose, Abigail's health is actually worsening. Due to Eleanor (Maya Kazan) not able to attend, Gallinger (Eric Johnson) attends a reunion with University of Pennsylvania classmates alone. He converses with his classmates about many subjects, including eugenics. Barrow (Jeremy Bobb) discovers that Junia (Rachel Korine) has an enormous lists of clients to see her and confronts her over not prioritizing him. Junia states that she considers Barrow to be the love of his life.

As Sister Harriet (Cara Seymour) begins her trial, Cornelia (Juliet Rylance) tries to convince Phillip (Tom Lipinski) in giving her a lawyer. He refuses, calling Harriet a murderer. Elkins (Eve Hewson) visits A.D. (Stephen Spinella) at his revival church. Motivated to speak up about her sins, she confesses using drugs and having had sex. He praises her at first, but at home, he calls her out for her actions. Despite her pleas for mercy, he brutally beats her for her sins. At a fight club, Cleary (Chris Sullivan) bets money on a boxer. When the boxer's performance looks to be lackluster, Cleary decides to drug him to improve it. However, the boxer instead collapses after suffering an overdose.

After visiting Abigail, Thackery meets with Edwards (André Holland) to discuss a potential cure to syphilis. He comes up with the concept of inducing fever into a patient, believing that the heat will kill the syphilis, but Edwards is unwilling to risk a patient's life for the results. Instead, Cleary provides them with a corpse so they can practice. Edwards is later called from his parents' house, as a woman has arrived. The woman is revealed to be Opal (Zaraah Abrahams), his European wife. As his parents confront him for marrying someone without telling them, Opal asks what did she miss.

== Production ==
=== Development ===
In September 2015, Cinemax announced that the third episode of the season would be titled "The Best with the Best to Get the Best", and that it would be written by series creators Jack Amiel and Michael Begler, and directed by executive producer Steven Soderbergh. This was Amiel's eleventh writing credit, Begler's eleventh writing credit, and Soderbergh's 13th directing credit.

== Reception ==
=== Viewers ===
In its original American broadcast, "The Best with the Best to Get the Best" was seen by an estimated 0.202 million household viewers with a 0.05 in the 18-49 demographics. This means that 0.05 percent of all households with televisions watched the episode. This was a slight decrease in viewership from the previous episode, which was watched by an estimated 0.229 million household viewers with a 0.06 in the 18-49 demographics.

=== Critical reviews ===
"The Best with the Best to Get the Best" received extremely positive reviews from critics. The review aggregator website Rotten Tomatoes reported an 100% approval rating for the episode, based on 9 reviews.

Brandon Nowalk of The A.V. Club gave the episode an "A–" grade and wrote, "'The Best With The Best To Get The Best' gets at the heart of The Knick, or maybe its skeleton, with a panorama across a rotten establishment: educators teaching eugenics, a judge taking the law into his own hands, a preacher putting on a show, socialites pretending they're role models, and life and death decided by Tammany Hall. This isn't just the usual, say, racist bullying at work and brutal mistreatment of the poor. This is a look at all kinds of people in power, building on the season's discussion of wealth as a symptom of character." Rodrigo Perez of IndieWire wrote, "Overall, 'The Best with the Best to Get the Best' isn't a very showy Steven Soderbergh effort, and Cliff Martinez's music is also a little muted, but the show's candle-lit look is still fantastic and Soderbergh still does a lot with a little. That said, we're back to Thackery being on the edge of progress and of danger."

Debbie Day of Entertainment Weekly wrote, "The title of tonight's episode is a quote from Dr. Everett Gallinger, as he discusses the cornerstone of eugenics with some old University of Pennsylvania pals at a reunion. But what's such a great slap in the face to The Knick's resident racist is the fact that when it comes to the events of the episode, breeding 'the best with the best to get the best' requires quite a bit of race- and religion-mixing." Ivy Pochoda of Vulture gave the episode a perfect 5 star rating out of 5 and wrote, "Let's get one thing out of the way. As I feared — or was it hoped? — after the end of the previous episode, it didn't take long for Thack to succumb to his inherent vices."

Mike Hale of The New York Times wrote, "Ambition — the brawling energy of early-20th-century New York — is always a theme on The Knick, and it was prominent in Friday night's episode. The show favors the bold." Steve MacFarlane of Slant Magazine wrote, "Jack Amiel and Michael Begler's dialogue is perhaps best suited for the stuffy turn-of-the-century milieu's public gatherings and social comminglings, which require director Steven Soderbergh's camera to stand as much on ceremony as do the show’s characters."

Alec Bojalad of Den of Geek a 4.5 star rating out of 5 and wrote, "The surgeons at the center of it are predisposed to dig both figuratively and literally through the human body for answers. The interesting wrinkle The Knick adds, however, is its period setting. Due to social constrictions, there is a whole subset of female characters desperate to 'Do Stuff' but who are not able or allowed." Shane Ryan of Paste a 8.2 star rating out of 10 and wrote, "There's a big challenge with any TV series to find ways to set up plot points that will expand through the next few episodes, but even after a full season and change, Amiel and Begler still haven't found a good rhythm yet."
