= The Golden Lotus (The Knick) =

- The Knick episode
- Episode no.: Season 1 Episode 9
- Directed by: Steven Soderbergh
- Written by: Steven Katz
- Cinematography by: Peter Andrews (Note: Pseudonym for Steven Soderbergh.)
- Editing by: Mary Ann Bernard
- Original release date: October 10, 2014
- Running time: 44 minutes

Guest appearances
- Glenn Fleshler as Police Captain; Danny Hoch as Bunky Collier; Rachel Izen as Nurse Braun; Tom Papa as Mr. Luff; Erin Wilhelmi as Lottie; Perry Yung as Ping Wu; Cara Kjellman as Mother; John Hodgman as Dr. Henry Cotton; Zuzanna Szadkowski as Nurse Pell; Kenny Morris as Mr. Oates; Reed Gahan as Boy Patient

Episode chronology
← Previous "Working Late a Lot"	Next → "Crutchfield"

"The Golden Lotus" is the ninth episode of the American medical period drama television series The Knick. The episode was written by Steven Katz, and directed by executive producer Steven Soderbergh. It originally aired on Cinemax on October 10, 2014.

The series is set in New York City in the early twentieth century and follows the staff of the Knickerbocker Hospital (the Knick), who struggle against the limitations of medical understanding and practice. The protagonist is Dr. John Thackery, the new leader of the surgery staff, who balances his cocaine and opium addictions against his ambition for medical discovery and his reputation among his peers. In the episode, Thackery's withdrawal worsens. Meanwhile, Cornelia discovers she is pregnant, while Gallinger faces tragedy.

According to Nielsen Media Research, the episode was seen by an estimated 0.319 million household viewers and gained a 0.09 ratings share among adults aged 18–49. The episode received critical acclaim, with critics praising Soderbergh's directing, performances, character development and pacing.

== Plot ==
With his cocaine withdrawal worsening, Thackery (Clive Owen) breaks into a pharmacy to steal cocaine. However, he is caught by the police, and faces five years in Sing Sing for the charges. Barrow (Jeremy Bobb) and August (Grainger Hines) are forced to bribe the police to drop the charges and release Thackery. Nevertheless, news of the event quickly hit the newspapers even though his name is not mentioned.

Upon learning of the events, Elkins (Eve Hewson) visits Thackery to check on him, deducing that he was the one mentioned in the newspapers. Thackery becomes aggressive, believing that Elkins was sent by August, before eventually breaking down. When she asks what she can do, he states he wants her to get more cocaine for him. She visits the opium den, but owner Ping Wu (Perry Yung) states that their cocaine has run out as it was deployed due to the Philippine–American War. However, Wu takes an interest in her foot and offers her $100 as well as opium, if she has sex with him with her foot in his mouth. Later, Elkins gives the opium to Thackery, claiming she sold her bicycle. However, Elkins is shown to still have her bicycle and also has $100.

Cornelia (Juliet Rylance) informs Edwards (André Holland) that she is pregnant. Edwards is delighted about the news, but Cornelia states that even though she also wants the baby, she must get an abortion as everyone will know who the father is. A distracted Edwards leaves, only to be confronted by Gallinger (Eric Johnson) in the hallway for changing treatment on a woman. However, Gallinger notes that Eleanor (Maya Kazan) arrived at the Knick and is shocked to discover that she drowned Grace on an ice box, killing her. Heartbroken, Gallinger has Eleanor institutionalized for her declining mental health. Later, Cornelia prepares for Edwards to perform the abortion, but eventually cannot bring himself to kill his own baby.

As he runs out of opium, Thackery meets with Luff (Tom Papa), offering to use his image in exchange for money, but is rebuffed as his history of drug abuse becomes more well known. That night, Elkins enters a German hospital by pretending to be a local nurse. She steals cocaine from the hospital and flees just as she is discovered. She takes the cocaine to Thackery, who injects himself. They then start having sex, with Thackery administering Elkins with cocaine.

== Production ==
=== Development ===
In September 2014, Cinemax announced that the ninth episode of the season would be titled "The Golden Lotus", and that it would be written by Steven Katz, and directed by executive producer Steven Soderbergh. This was Katz's second writing credit, and Soderbergh's ninth directing credit.

== Reception ==
=== Viewers ===
In its original American broadcast, "The Golden Lotus" was seen by an estimated 0.319 million household viewers with a 0.09 in the 18-49 demographics. This means that 0.09 percent of all households with televisions watched the episode. This was a 9% decrease in viewership from the previous episode, which was watched by an estimated 0.349 million household viewers with a 0.09 in the 18-49 demographics.

=== Critical reviews ===
"The Golden Lotus" received critical acclaim. The review aggregator website Rotten Tomatoes reported an 80% approval rating for the episode, based on 10 reviews. The site's consensus states: "'The Golden Lotus' offers emotional moments for its major players and continues The Knick's bleak, sobering march toward its season finale in a compelling fashion."

Matt Fowler of IGN gave the episode a "great" 8.8 out of 10 and wrote in his verdict, "Despite the show feeling like a procession of foreseeable tragedies sometimes, this was still an excellent penultimate season episode. An episode that worked to take Thackery down a peg in everyone's eyes, except Lucy. Lucy, who might just be even more excited to be with him now because there's a part of him that occasionally becomes desperate for her help. And who knows how long it'll be before she's addicted as well? The end of the episode seemed to suggest 'ahem' an escalation with regards to her use of the drug."

Brandon Nowalk of The A.V. Club gave the episode an "A" grade and wrote, "Right on cue, this being the penultimate episode of the season, the big problems come to a head. We've known about Thackery's withdrawal and jonesing, but 'The Golden Lotus' adds breaking and entering, indignity on top of indignity, and an ocean of rumors."

Debbie Day of Entertainment Weekly wrote, "Dr. Thackery has come undone. For those keeping score, he has now racked up so many bad-behavior points that Barrow looks positively saintly in comparison." Keith Uhlich of Vulture gave the episode a 3 star rating out of 5 and wrote, "Soderbergh's color palette seems to reflect Thack's dire state: Where the series has typically favored warm oranges (usually cast by lantern light), it now emphasizes icy blues."

Mike Hale of The New York Times wrote, "John Thackery, the cocaine-addled chief surgeon of the Knickerbocker Hospital, took even greater leave of his senses in 'The Golden Lotus,' Friday’s episode of The Knick. So did the show, for long stretches. Its swing away from medical and social history, which it does very well, and toward addiction and romantic melodrama, which it doesn't, was just about complete." Steve MacFarlane of Slant Magazine wrote, "In that episode, it was hard to parse what The Knick honestly wanted to do in its sweeping, New York-centric context. But when the episodes are centered on the intrapersonal dynamics of the hospital staff, Soderbergh and his cast never run out of character riches; 'The Golden Lotus' sees Dr. Chickering, at long last, betraying his disappointment with Lucy for not returning his affections, but it only lasts a second."

Gerri Mahn of Den of Geek a perfect 5 star rating out of 5 and wrote, "The fact that that Soderbergh is willing to deal with race, addiction, insanity, and child mortality in the stark and unforgiving context of the time, is absolutely astounding. He does not flinch, he does not blink, and every episode rubs salt into wounds we did not realize were so deep." Robert Ham of Paste gave the episode an 8.7 out of 10 and wrote, "There's little chance of a big happy ending to send us all off smiling into the fall and winter — just another cold chill on the back of our neck as further complications and drama befall the employees and owners of the hospital."
