= Ten Knots =

- The Knick episode
- Episode no.: Season 2 Episode 1
- Directed by: Steven Soderbergh
- Written by: Jack Amiel; Michael Begler
- Cinematography by: Peter Andrews (Note: Pseudonym for Steven Soderbergh.)
- Editing by: Mary Ann Bernard
- Original release date: October 16, 2015
- Running time: 55 minutes

Guest appearances
- Todd Barry as Dentist; Gibson Frazier as Harold Prettyman; Arielle Goldman as Genevieve Everidge; Russell G. Jones as Eye Doctor; Ben Livingston as Dr. William H. Mays; Maryann Plunkett as Mother Superior; Andrew Rannells as Frazier H. Wingo; Gary Simpson as Hobart Showalter; Frank Wood as Mr. Havershorn; Perry Yung as Ping Wu; Morgan Assante as Cromartie Receptionist; Annabelle Attanasio as Dorothy Walcott; Michael Berresse as Parke-Davis Representative; Gia Crovatin as Clara Horner; Ylfa Edelstein as Nurse Baker; Wynn Harmon as Mayor Robert Anderson Van Wyck; Timothy Hughes as Wrestler; Jeff Kim as Dr. Feng; Makenzie Leigh as Amy O'Connor; Jeff Mantel as Dock Foreman; Jerry Miller as Cromartie Orderly; Cliff Moylan as Officer; Lucas Papaelias as Eldon Pouncey; Corey Patrick as Policeman; Richard James Porter as Monsignor Joseph Mills Lawlor; Zuzanna Szadkowski as Nurse Pell; Ginger Taylor as Sonya Smyslov; Mitchell Vallen as Otto; Erin Wilhelmi as Lottie

Episode chronology
← Previous "Crutchfield"	Next → "You're No Rose"

"Ten Knots" is the first episode of the second season of the American medical period drama television series The Knick. It is the eleventh overall episode of the series and was written by series creators Jack Amiel and Michael Begler, and directed by executive producer Steven Soderbergh. It originally aired on Cinemax on October 16, 2015.

The series is set in New York City in the early twentieth century and follows the staff of the Knickerbocker Hospital (the Knick), who struggle against the limitations of medical understanding and practice. The protagonist is Dr. John Thackery, the new leader of the surgery staff, who balances his cocaine and opium addictions against his ambition for medical discovery and his reputation among his peers. In the episode, one year after the previous episodes, the lives of the Knick staff face different challenges.

According to Nielsen Media Research, the episode was seen by an estimated 0.269 million household viewers and gained a 0.07 ratings share among adults aged 18–49. The episode received extremely positive reviews from critics, with particular praise towards Soderbergh's directing.

== Plot ==
With Thackery (Clive Owen) still on the clinic, Edwards (André Holland) is now the acting Chief of Surgery at the Knick. Gallinger (Eric Johnson) has taken time off from work to tend Eleanor (Maya Kazan). Sister Harriet (Cara Seymour) has been imprisoned in Blackwell's Island after getting caught performing abortions, with Cleary (Chris Sullivan) promising to find her a good lawyer.

While Edwards wants a permanent position as Chief of Surgery, he is dismayed when he is diagnosed with a detached retina from injuries suffered while fighting in bars. During a meeting with the board of directors, he is informed that the position will only be temporary while they look for a new Chief. Cornelia (Juliet Rylance) has moved with Phillip (Tom Lipinski) to San Francisco, where she helps Chinese immigrants quarantined by providing them food. However, they are visited by Phillip's father, Hobart (Gary Simpson), who has decided to have them move back to New York to live with him. With Collier's death, Ping Wu (Perry Yung) has now become the newest loan shark by inheriting his debts, one of which includes Barrow (Jeremy Bobb).

Gallinger returns to the Knick and is disappointed to find Edwards as the Chief of Surgery. He visits Thackery at the clinic, where the latter has been performing underground procedures on prostitutes for drug money. Needing his help, he decides to kidnap him and takes him on a boat, forcing him to detox. After a painful drug withdrawal, Thackery's condition improves. As they head back to the shore, Thackery tells Gallinger that he had an epiphany, in which he states his intent in finding a cure for drug addiction.

== Production ==
=== Development ===
In September 2015, Cinemax announced that the first episode of the season would be titled "Ten Knots", and that it would be written by series creators Jack Amiel and Michael Begler, and directed by executive producer Steven Soderbergh. This was Amiel's ninth writing credit, Begler's ninth writing credit, and Soderbergh's eleventh directing credit.

== Reception ==
=== Viewers ===
In its original American broadcast, "Ten Knots" was seen by an estimated 0.269 million household viewers with a 0.07 in the 18–49 demographics. This means that 0.07 percent of all households with televisions watched the episode. This was a 35% decrease in viewership from the previous episode, which was watched by an estimated 0.413 million household viewers with a 0.09 in the 18–49 demographics.

=== Critical reviews ===
"Ten Knots" received extremely positive reviews from critics. The review aggregator website Rotten Tomatoes reported an 91% approval rating for the episode, based on 11 reviews. The site's consensus states: "In 'Ten Knots,' the promising first hour of season two, Soderbergh's artistic and technical choices provide a satisfying catch-up with all of The Knick's major characters."

Matt Fowler of IGN gave the episode a "great" 8.2 out of 10 and wrote in his verdict, "Broken ground ushered in a new era for The Knick, both thematically and physically, as the hospital's poised to make a big cross-city move. Meanwhile, as usual, anyone's life can take a violent slide into misfortune at any point, though misery is often the focus here. Fortunately, Soderbergh's versatile style can service many thematic masters and his skill with atmosphere helps elevate both performance and story."

Brandon Nowalk of The A.V. Club gave the episode an "A–" grade and wrote, "A detached retina, a bowl of teeth, a nose peeled back-the human body has been beaten down by 1901 on The Knick." Rodrigo Perez of IndieWire wrote, "Most period dramas are nostalgic and romanticized, The Knick constantly reminds us just how horrible the turn of the century was and how common sickness was basically a death sentence."

Debbie Day of Entertainment Weekly wrote, "History has shown that the answer to drug addiction is not so much a cure, but treatment and management. So while it will be fascinating to see how Thack's work will contribute to what we now know as recovery therapies, we must also be prepared to watch him die a slow death trying to find the right answer to this medical conundrum." Ivy Pochoda of Vulture gave the episode a 4 star rating out of 5 and wrote, "It seems that Nurse Elkins is going to get her wish - her days are not going to remain mundane for long."

Mike Hale of The New York Times wrote, "working within those limits, Mr. Soderbergh constructs a seamless, shimmering, restlessly propulsive visual narrative that can fairly be called poetic. Some of his choices are probably practical, like the way so many dim interior sets are lighted by harsh white light coming through windows, which also gives a sense of the cold city outside. Some are simple but unusual for television, like the number of medium and long shots, or are simply a matter of editing skill, like the artful ways in which composition, movement and sound bridge scene changes. What stays with you, though, are the virtuoso moments, the things you simply don't see elsewhere on TV." Steve MacFarlane of Slant Magazine wrote, "Steven Soderbergh's period epic The Knick remains a smorgasbord of scrupulous period detail, as the second season's all-business opener, 'Ten Knots,' picks up exactly where last season's beyond-bleak conclusion left off."

Alec Bojalad of Den of Geek a 4.5 star rating out of 5 and wrote, "In the age of subtlety, The Knick continues to be able to tell a compelling story in exciting, broad strokes. Season two of The Knick is a big abscess. Gross, excessive and primed to pop." Robert Ham of Paste gave the episode a 9.1 out of 10 and wrote, "When we first caught a glimpse of the brilliant Dr. John Thackery at the beginning of The Knick's inaugural season, he looked like a rock star, complete with dark shades, bad attitude, and a healthy drug habit. As we open up the new season, he is the first thing we see, but he is a much changed man: haunted, hollow, and completely lost in the sway of a new addiction to heroin."
