= Crutchfield (The Knick) =

- The Knick episode
- Episode no.: Season 1 Episode 10
- Directed by: Steven Soderbergh
- Written by: Jack Amiel; Michael Begler
- Cinematography by: Peter Andrews (Note: Pseudonym for Steven Soderbergh.)
- Editing by: Mary Ann Bernard
- Original release date: October 17, 2014
- Running time: 58 minutes

Guest appearances
- Charles Aitken as Henry Robertson; David Wilson Barnes as Addiction Doctor; LaTonya Borsay as Evaline Edwards; Danny Hoch as Bunky Collier; John Hodgman as Dr. Henry Cotton; Rachel Korine as Junia; Tom Lipinski as Phillip Showalter; Michael Nathanson as Dr. Levi Zinberg; Reg Rogers as Dr. Bertram Chickering, Sr.; Frank Wood as Mr. Havershorn; Perry Yung as Ping Wu; Happy Anderson as Jimmy; Michael Berresse as Parke-Davis Representative; Lucas Papaelias as Eldon Pouncey; Molly Price as Effie Barrow; Suzanne Savoy as Victoria Robertson; Gary Simpson as Hobart Showalter; Alfred "Ice" Cole as Prize Fighter; Johanna Day as Eunice Showalter; Rob Morgan as Diggs Man; Richard James Porter as Monsignor Joseph Mills Lawlor; Kim Rideout as Cornelia's Maid; Zuzanna Szadkowski as Nurse Pell; Ginger A. Taylor as Sonya Smyslov; Noelle P. Wilson as Cromartie Nurse

Episode chronology
← Previous "The Golden Lotus"	Next → "Ten Knots"

"Crutchfield" is the tenth episode and first-season finale of the American medical period drama television series The Knick. The episode was written by series creators Jack Amiel and Michael Begler, and directed by executive producer Steven Soderbergh. It originally aired on Cinemax on October 17, 2014.

The series is set in New York City in the early twentieth century and follows the staff of the Knickerbocker Hospital (the Knick), who struggle against the limitations of medical understanding and practice. The protagonist is Dr. John Thackery, the new leader of the surgery staff, who balances his cocaine and opium addictions against his ambition for medical discovery and his reputation among his peers. In the episode, Thackery's drug addiction reaches a critical point, while Barrow finds a way to end his debts to Collier.

According to Nielsen Media Research, the episode was seen by an estimated 0.413 million household viewers and gained a 0.09 ratings share among adults aged 18–49. The episode received critical acclaim, who praised Soderbergh's directing, performances and writing.

== Plot ==
At night, Cornelia (Juliet Rylance) is picked up by Cleary (Chris Sullivan), who takes her with Sister Harriet (Cara Seymour) to perform an abortion. Cornelia is surprised by their roles in the abortion, especially Harriet as she considered her a trustworthy friend. Despite her reservations, the abortion goes as planned.

Thackery (Clive Owen) and Edwards (André Holland) attend a surgery performed by Dr. Zinberg (Michael Nathanson), who announces that he is collaborating with Karl Landsteiner on a blood transfusion theory. Wanting to get a lead, Thackery gives all the surgeries to Edwards while he focuses in researching the blood types. Thackery's drug addiction continues affecting his relationship with Elkins (Eve Hewson), as he tries new methods with a new patient.

Gallinger (Eric Johnson) visits Eleanor (Maya Kazan) and is shocked to discover that Dr. Henry Cotton made a controversial method by removing all her teeth, deeming that they seek to treat her mental health. Later, Gallinger fights with Edwards in the hospital, causing Barrow to suspend him. Edwards is also informed by Cornelia of the abortion. While he accepts it had to be done, he ends their affair, disappointing her. Cornelia finally marries Phillip (Tom Lipinski), but Edwards chooses to skip the ceremony and drink at a bar, where he instigates a fight and is beaten unconscious.

Barrow (Jeremy Bobb) continues to be cornered by Collier (Danny Hoch), who is upset that Barrow spends more in prostitutes than settling his debt. After being brutally beaten, Barrow meets with Ping Wu, offering him money to kill Collier. He convinces Wu in ordering the hit by claiming that he represents Thackery, even though the latter refused to get involved. Later, Wu kills Collier and decides to take his loans, making Barrow realize the mistake he has made.

Thackery decides to try an experimental blood transfusion procedure on the patient, using his own blood to cure her. However, the blood ends up killing the patient due to Thackery's misunderstanding of blood types. Elkins asks Chickering (Michael Angarano) for help, who in turn refers to his father (Reg Rogers). They decide to send Thackery to a recovery clinic to treat his addiction. During this, August (Grainger Hines) talks with the board of directors, who are worried about the Knick's state following recent tragedies and is suggested that they can shut it down and move uptown. The board of directors all vote in favor of moving. At Cromartie Hospital, Thackery checks in under the name Crutchfield and is given a drug to help with the withdrawal. As Thackery is left to rest in his room, the drug is revealed to be heroin.

== Production ==
=== Development ===
In September 2014, Cinemax announced that the tenth episode of the season would be titled "Crutchfield", and that it would be written by series creators Jack Amiel and Michael Begler, and directed by executive producer Steven Soderbergh. This was Amiel's eighth writing credit, Begler's eighth writing credit, and Soderbergh's tenth directing credit.

== Reception ==
=== Viewers ===
In its original American broadcast, "Crutchfield" was seen by an estimated 0.413 million household viewers with a 0.09 in the 18-49 demographics. This means that 0.09 percent of all households with televisions watched the episode. This was a 29% increase in viewership from the previous episode, which was watched by an estimated 0.319 million household viewers with a 0.09 in the 18-49 demographics.

=== Critical reviews ===
"Crutchfield" received critical acclaim. The review aggregator website Rotten Tomatoes reported an 82% approval rating for the episode, based on 11 reviews. The site's consensus states: "'Crutchfield' concludes on a grim note for many of its characters, fulfilling the promise of somber but captivating storytelling The Knick established from its very first episode."

Matt Fowler of IGN gave the episode an "amazing" 9 out of 10 and wrote in his verdict, "The Knick's season finale, which held actual serious consequences for just about every character on the show, was a beautifully unnerving ride. No happy endings here. Heroes dethroned and shamed. True love vanquished by the era's intolerance. No recourse of any sort for anyone with a serious mental illness. Soderbergh's direction and camera work were on-point here, at some moments even feeling like he was pushing us out and away as viewers just as Thackery chased off, and let down, those around him."

Brandon Nowalk of The A.V. Club gave the episode an "A" grade and wrote, "Even before this final act, 'Crutchfield' was the most exquisite episode of The Knick, but after it, 'Crutchfield' is evangelism material."

Debbie Day of Entertainment Weekly wrote, "The Steven Soderbergh–directed series wraps up its first season not in a happy place, but instead with every character in jeopardy, which is pretty much exactly where a show with a season 2 order perhaps should end." Keith Uhlich of Vulture gave the episode a 3 star rating out of 5 and wrote, "Endings are difficult. For its final first-season episode, 'Crutchfield', Cinemax's period hospital drama The Knick attempts to tie off a number of lingering narrative threads, and this it does — though in ways that feel, in toto, extremely conventional. This has been a problem that I've remarked on through the run of the series: The scripts rarely live up to Soderbergh's extraordinary craft. His constant inventiveness (finding new ways of seeing in almost every scene) only underscores the many flaws of the storytelling."

Mike Hale of The New York Times wrote, "Most seasons end with cliffhangers. The Season 1 finale of The Knick on Friday night was more like a slow-moving avalanche that left every major character buried — in grief, remorse, apprehension, fear, addiction." Steve MacFarlane of Slant Magazine wrote, "Right up to the finish line, Soderbergh fudges the show's tone to the point of emotional misdirection, with 'Crutchfield' signing off on a note that's both grimly hilarious and which sucks most of the pathos out of Thackery's downfall."

Gerri Mahn of Den of Geek a perfect 5 star rating out of 5 and wrote, "Its shows like this that make me happy to pay my bloated cable bill. Its shows like this that make me nod my head in emphatic agreement whenever I hear someone say we are in the midst of a television programming renaissance. Tonight, 'Crutchfield' ties up loose ends, and sets a definite tone for season two." Robert Ham of Paste gave the episode an 8.8 out of 10 and wrote, "This season finale follows the template of most any other show: pile on the drama and leave plenty of loose ends dangling to have viewers slavering for the second season to start."
