= Catch 22: Based on the Unwritten Story by Seanie Sugrue =

- Directed by: Josh Folan
- Written by: Josh Folan; Seanie Sugrue
- Produced by: Josh Folan; Seanie Sugrue
- Starring: Jayce Bartok; Brock Harris; Dónall Ó Héalaí; Michael Rabe; Al Thompson; Charmane Star; Phil Burke; Donald Paul
- Cinematography: Mark Sanders
- Edited by: Josh Folan
- Music by: Medhat Hanbali
- Production companies: NYEH Entertainment; Locked In the Attic Productions
- Distributed by: 108 Media
- Release dates: April 7, 2016 (Palm Beach); January 17, 2017
- Running time: 91 minutes
- Country: United States
- Language: English

Catch 22: Based on the Unwritten Story by Seanie Sugrue is a 2016 United States thriller independent film. It premiered at the 2016 Palm Beach International Film Festival and would go on to play numerous others before being acquired for distribution by Toronto-based 108 Media. It was released theatrically on January 17, 2017.

== Synopsis ==
With Hurricane Sandy looming on the horizon, five hard-lived friends come to from a send-off celebration alongside an unexplained dead girl. What are friends for?

== Cast ==
- Jayce Bartok ... Vince
- Brock Harris ... Smoke
- Dónall Ó Héalaí ... Mikey
- Michael Rabe ... Seanie
- Al Thompson ... Bird
- Charmane Star ... Girl
- Phil Burke ... Dude
- Josh Folan ... Todd/Dad
