= Wonderful Surprises =

- The Knick episode
- Episode no.: Season 2 Episode 4
- Directed by: Steven Soderbergh
- Written by: Jack Amiel; Michael Begler
- Cinematography by: Peter Andrews (Note: Pseudonym for Steven Soderbergh.)
- Editing by: Mary Ann Bernard
- Original release date: November 6, 2015
- Running time: 56 minutes

Guest appearances
- Michael Cumpsty as Judge Parkinson Bothamly; Linda Emond as Anne Chickering; Jennifer Ferrin as Abigail Alford; Rachel Annette Helson as Susie; Ben Livingston as Dr. William H. Mays; Molly Price as Effie Barrow; Anthony Rapp as Dr. Thurman Drexler; Reg Rogers as Dr. Bertram Chickering, Sr.; Erin Wilhelmi as Lottie; Happy Anderson as Jimmy; Annabelle Attanasio as Dorothy Walcott; Lily Brahms as Clara Chickering; Blair Busbee as Society Woman #1; Helen Cespedes as Society Woman #2; Libby Collins as Speight's Neighbor; Johanna Day as Eunice Showalter; Colman Domingo as Dr. Russell Daniels; Wally Dunn as Dr. Grindin; Ylfa Edelstein as Nurse Baker; Eleni Fuiaxis as Mrs. Gianoulis; Jenna Gavigan as Society Woman #3; Sydney Hollis as Bailiff; Brian Kerwin as Corky Vanderbilt; Emily Kinney as Nurse Daisy Ryan; Joseph McKenna as Man; Aedin Moloney as Sister Mary Michael; John O'Creagh as Tammany Hall Official; James Joseph O'Neil as Dr. Grindin; Ciarán O'Reilly as Priest; Zachary Phillips as Wendell; Alexandra Roxo as Cate; Suzanne Savoy as Victoria Robertson; Britian Seibert as Society Woman #4; Gary Simpson as Hobart Showalter; Athan Sporek as Paulo; Forrest Weber as Policeman; Frank Wood as Mr. Havershorn; Annie Young as Nurse Howland

Episode chronology
← Previous "The Best with the Best to Get the Best"	Next → "Whiplash"

"Wonderful Surprises" is the fourth episode of the second season of the American medical period drama television series The Knick. It is the 14th overall episode of the series and was written by series creators Jack Amiel and Michael Begler, and directed by executive producer Steven Soderbergh. It originally aired on Cinemax on November 6, 2015.

The series is set in New York City in the early twentieth century and follows the staff of the Knickerbocker Hospital (the Knick), who struggle against the limitations of medical understanding and practice. The protagonist is Dr. John Thackery, the new leader of the surgery staff, who balances his cocaine and opium addictions against his ambition for medical discovery and his reputation among his peers. In the episode, Thackery desperately tries to cure Abigail as her conditions worsens, while Edwards must deal with his wife's return.

According to Nielsen Media Research, the episode was seen by an estimated 0.166 million household viewers and gained a 0.03 ratings share among adults aged 18–49. The episode received extremely positive reviews from critics, who praised the progress in the storylines and performances.

== Plot ==
Edwards (André Holland) and Opal (Zaraah Abrahams) argue over the former hiding his marriage over his stay. She will not grant him a divorce and plans in moving in with him. During a dinner with the Robertsons, Opal brings up the fact that she and Edwards could sit with them, yet his parents, both servants, cannot. Despite feeling embarrassed, Edwards decides to take her to a Harlem nightclub. They dance and they appear to reconcile.

Elkins (Eve Hewson) helps Dr. William H. Mays (Ben Livingston) during a surgery. However, Mays accidentally sets himself on fire due to a malfunction, dying afterwards. As Thackery (Clive Owen) talks to her, he notices that A.D. brutally beat her. Thackery wants to take action, but Elkins informs him that her father already left for West Virginia, having made a great amount of money in New York. With the amount of pressure, Elkins visits Sister Harriet (Cara Seymour), confessing that she is done with living with abusive men and wanting to move forward.

Chickering (Michael Angarano) discovers that his mother has been diagnosed with an esophageal tumor. He intends to cure her, even when Dr. Zinberg (Michael Nathanson) claims it is impossible. Barrow (Jeremy Bobb) meets with a boss in Tammany Hall to discuss a potential deal regarding protection. The boss agrees on providing protection in exchange for 15% of his profits. While Eleanor (Maya Kazan) walks on the street, she is accosted by an Italian-American child beggar. The child is sent to jail, where Gallinger (Eric Johnson) punches him.

Phillip (Tom Lipinski) tells Cornelia (Juliet Rylance) that he is leaving alongside Hobart (Gary Simpson) for Ohio to check on one of their establishments. She then joins Cleary (Chris Sullivan) in a new plan to help Harriet, as she has no lawyer to represent her. Desperate, Cleary rounds up some of Harriet's former clients, forcing them to blackmail the judge in order to dismiss the case, or having their names published in the newspapers, facing prison time. They do so, and the judge decides to release her. While Cleary offers to let her stay with him, she declines the offer. Gallinger later talks about the incident with a classmate, with both deciding that it would be better if these kids were sterilized.

Abigail (Jennifer Ferrin) is brought to the Knick when her condition worsens. In an attempt to cure to syphilis, Thackery decides to use her as a test subject by raising her body temperature to over 107 degrees Fahrenheit, injecting her with malaria. Edwards objects to the treatment, fearing that the process will kill her. That night, Thackery dreams of spending time with Abigail on a sailboat. He wakes up when Abigail calls him, having awakened from her condition.

== Production ==
=== Development ===
In October 2015, Cinemax announced that the fourth episode of the season would be titled "Wonderful Surprises", and that it would be written by series creators Jack Amiel and Michael Begler, and directed by executive producer Steven Soderbergh. This was Amiel's twelfth writing credit, Begler's twelfth writing credit, and Soderbergh's 14th directing credit.

== Reception ==
=== Viewers ===
In its original American broadcast, "Wonderful Surprises" was seen by an estimated 0.166 million household viewers with a 0.03 in the 18-49 demographics. This means that 0.03 percent of all households with televisions watched the episode. This was a 16% decrease in viewership from the previous episode, which was watched by an estimated 0.202 million household viewers with a 0.05 in the 18-49 demographics.

=== Critical reviews ===
"Wonderful Surprises" received extremely positive reviews from critics. The review aggregator website Rotten Tomatoes reported a 100% approval rating for the episode, based on 10 reviews. The site's consensus states: "Characterizations of The Knick's major players - especially Zaraah Abrahams as Opal Edwards - are augmented by Soderbergh's mastery behind the camera in 'Wonderful Surprises.'"

Brandon Nowalk of The A.V. Club gave the episode a "B+" grade and wrote, "'Wonderful Surprises' is similar to 'The Best With The Best To Get The Best' in its focus on who has power and how they wield it, but it shifts perspective slightly to focus on gender. It's an episode about a bunch of men making decisions for women." Rodrigo Perez of IndieWire wrote, "As much as we admire the dexterity and nimbleness of filmmaker Steven Soderbergh, The Knick writers and showrunners Jack Amiel Michael Begler should be given credit for the bon mots and more of 'Wonderful Surprises.' The duo crosscut, begin and end mini story lines and character arcs with their own gracefulness while still informing and driving the bigger picture."

Debbie Day of Entertainment Weekly wrote, "It's getting busy for Dr. John Thackery over at the Knick these days. Now that he's figured out how to continue taking drugs without getting caught — by speedballing cocaine and heroin up his nose — he has resumed his addiction research in this week's episode of The Knick. The irony of this in theory is mind-boggling, but whenever someone like Thack is concerned, this scenario is still the most natural of progressions." Ivy Pochoda of Vulture gave the episode a perfect 5 star rating out of 5 and wrote, "Unlike this show's previous episodes, this week's offering doesn't send us trundling deeper into the dark recesses of humanity's infected soul, but instead suggests that, although the path may be risky and surprising, redemption, satisfaction, and even happiness are within reach for some."

Mike Hale of The New York Times wrote, "Opal Edwards was up and Cornelia Showalter was down in this week's episode of The Knick, in which Zaraah Abrahams, as Opal, Algernon Edwards's heretofore secret wife, is quickly establishing herself as one of the show's strongest characters." Steve MacFarlane of Slant Magazine wrote, "'Wonderful Surprises' is so over-stacked with incident as to make each scene work purely as exposition. The episode allows for a number of one-on-ones between characters, which director Steven Soderbergh successfully plays out in longer, more fluid takes."

Alec Bojalad of Den of Geek a 4 star rating out of 5 and wrote, "'Wonderful Surprises,' while being the relative weakest episode of the second season thus far is actually still filled with these 'little gifts' to the audience." Shane Ryan of Paste an 8.6 star rating out of 10 and wrote, "It almost seems unfair to the acting and writing of The Knick to keep harping on about Steven Soderbergh's work behind the camera and the use of the editing software on his laptop. But, as so many people have been pointing out over the past few weeks, and in the months leading up to this second season, this show would be remarkably different — and potentially worse — without it."
