= Gia Crovatin =

American actress (born 1985)

- Occupation: Actress
- Years active: 2008–present

Gia Crovatin is an American actress. She is best known for her film roles as Dylan in the 2015 comedy film Dirty Weekend and Sasha in the comedy film I Feel Pretty.

Her television roles include Drew in the comedy series Billy & Billie (2015–2016), Anastasia in the thriller series Van Helsing (2016–2017), McKayla in Billions (2017–2018), and Devonne Wilson in Hightown (2020–2021).

She frequently collaborates in stage plays directed by Neil LaBute.

== Career ==
In 2008, Crovatin made her screen debut when she played a character in the short film The Conservatory. The following year, she played Malerie in the short film Coffee's Better Without Dinner.

Following this, she went on to play Dylan Price in the 2015 comedy film Dirty Weekend starring Matthew Broderick and Alice Eve. From 2015 to 2016, she then played the role of Drew in the comedy television series Billy & Billie, for 9 episodes.

From 2016 to 2017, she played Anastasia in the thriller series Van Helsing for 4 episodes. From 2017 to 2018, she played McKayla in the drama television series Billions for 5 episodes. In 2018, Crovatin played Sasha in the comedy film I Feel Pretty starring Amy Schumer.

In 2020, she played the girlfriend of Monica Raymund's character in the drama series Hightown. The same year, she played a wife in True Love Will Find You in the End, a stage play that is set in the COVID-19 pandemic.

== Filmography ==
=== Film ===
Year	Title	Role	Notes
2008	The Conservatory	Auditioner #1	Short film
2009	Coffee's Better Without Dinner	Malerie	
2011	When Harry Tries to Marry	Waitress	
2011	Rehearsal	Actress	
2011	Ostrander	Kim	Short film
2011	Ipso Facto	The Blonde / Mrs. Ferguson	Short film
2012	BFF	Jill	Short film
2014	My America	The College Graduate	Segment: "Current Events"
2014	Ned Rifle	Olive	
2014	Seven Lovers	Tess	
2015	Sure Thing	Betty	Short film
2015	Dirty Weekend	Dylan Price	
2017	The Depths	Jess	
2017	Good Luck: In Farsi	Kate	Short film
2018	I Feel Pretty	Sasha	
2019	Modern/Love in 7 Short Films	Betty	
2020	Before/During/After	Model #1	
2020	Still Here	Paige Sullivan	
2022	House of Darkness	Lucy	
2023	Fear the Night	Mia	
2025	Where to Land	Laura	

=== Television ===
Year	Title	Role	Notes
2012	My America		Episode: "Current Events"
2013	Full Circle	Sabrina	5 episodes
2014	Californication	Nun	Episode: "Faith, Hope, Love"
2014	Hell on Wheels	Mrs. Delaney	3 episodes
2015	The Good Wife	Georgette	Episode: "Red Meat"
2015–2016	Billy & Billie	Drew	9 episodes
2015	Benders	Molly	Episode: "The Sport of Kings"
2015	The Knick	Clara Horner	Episodes: "Ten Knots" and "The Best with the Best to Get the Best"
2016	Younger	Dr. Sarkisian	Episode: "Tattoo You"
2016–2017	Van Helsing	Anastasia	4 episodes
2017	Law & Order: Special Victims Unit	Samantha Chapman	Episode: "Great Expectations"
2017–2018	Billions	McKayla	5 episodes
2018	Elementary	Marcy Nix	Episode: "Pushing Buttons"
2018	One Dollar		Episodes: "Garrett Drimmer" and "Cooper Shaw"
2019	Blue Bloods	Collette Dawkins	Episode: "Ripple Effect"
2019	The Blacklist	OUC Assassin	Episode: "The Osterman Umbrella Company (No. 6)"
2019	Emergence	Caitlyn Martin	Episodes: "Pilot" and "Camera Wheelbarrow Tiger Pillow"
2020–2021	Hightown	Devonne Wilson	4 episodes Recurring cast
2020	The Good Lord Bird	Martha	Television miniseries Episode: "Hiving the Bees"
