= Van Helsing (TV series) =

American-Canadian fantasy horror television series

- Genre: Fantasy; Horror; Drama; Action; Post-apocalyptic
- Created by: Neil LaBute
- Based on: Helsing by Zenescope Entertainment
- Directed by: David Winning
- Starring: Kelly Overton; Jonathan Scarfe; Christopher Heyerdahl; David Cubitt; Vincent Gale; Rukiya Bernard; Trezzo Mahoro; Laura Mennell; Paul Johansson; Missy Peregrym; Aleks Paunovic; Caroline Cave; Keeya King; Nicole Muñoz; Neal McDonough; Tricia Helfer; Jennifer Cheon Garcia; Jesse Stanley; Heather Doerksen; Kim Coates; Dan Cade
- Composer: Rich Walters
- Countries of origin: United States; Canada
- Original language: English
- No. of seasons: 5
- No. of episodes: 65

Production
- Executive producers: Dave Brown; Zadoc Angell; Evan Tylor; Chris Regina; Michael Nankin; Dan March; Neil LaBute; Simon Barry; Chad Oakes; Mike Frislev
- Producer: Chris Rudolph
- Production locations: Vancouver, British Columbia, Canada
- Editor: Bridget Durnford
- Running time: 42–43 minutes
- Production companies: Echo Lake Entertainment; Dynamic Television; Nomadic Pictures

Original release
- Network: Syfy
- Release: July 31, 2016 – June 25, 2021

Van Helsing is a fantasy horror drama television series. Kelly Overton plays the titular character of the series, which was inspired by Zenescope Entertainment's graphic novel series Helsing. A commercial-free advance preview of the pilot aired on July 31, 2016, on Syfy ahead of its September 23, 2016 premiere. In December 2019, Syfy renewed the series for a fifth and final season which premiered on April 16, 2021, and concluded on June 25, 2021.

== Plot ==
Van Helsing is set in a post-apocalyptic near future. Vanessa Van Helsing, a descendant of Abraham Van Helsing, awakens from a coma after her supposed death to find herself in a post-apocalyptic world, three years after an eruption of the Yellowstone Caldera had blanketed the world in ash, blocking out sunlight and allowing vampires to overrun humanity. She is humanity's last hope, as her unique blood composition gives her the ability to turn vampires back into humans. With this secret weapon, Vanessa becomes a prime target for the vampires. She is protected by a Marine ordered to keep her safe, and the doctor who saved her, so she can lead a resistance against the vampires that plague the world's survivors.

In the second season, Vanessa journeys east towards the safe haven of Denver, Colorado and discovers her long-lost sister Scarlett, who has been trained to kill vampires since birth. In the third season, Vanessa and Scarlett hunt the Elders, the original vampires, in order to defeat them for good. Following Vanessa's apparent death in the fourth season, the series switches focus to her long-lost biological daughters Violet and Jack as they face a new "daywalker" breed of vampires as well as the "Dark One" and ruler of the vampire species, Countess Olivia von Dracula and her brides, a former countess of Transylvania and de facto President of the United States.

== Cast and characters ==
=== Main ===
- Kelly Overton as Vanessa Krauser / Van Helsing (formerly Vanessa Stewart), humanity's last hope to lead an offensive to take back what has been lost in a post-Rising world, as her unique blood composition gives her the ability to turn vampires back into humans.
- Jonathan Scarfe as Axel Miller, a former Marine with unwavering devotion and loyalty to both duty and Vanessa, despite years of isolation.
- Christopher Heyerdahl as Samuel "Sam" (seasons 1–4), a deaf survivor of the Rising who relies on his strength and observational skills to stay hidden.
- David Cubitt as John (season 1; guest season 3), a survivor of the Rising whose actions are fueled by anger, prejudice, suspicion and fear.
- Vincent Gale as Phil "Flesh" Fleischman (seasons 1–4), a vampire who was originally a human named Phil Fleishman.
- Rukiya Bernard as Sarah "Doc" Carol, a Seattleite medical examiner and scientist.
- Trezzo Mahoro as Mohamad (seasons 1–2; recurring season 3), a happy guy, despite all of the evil in the world.
- Tim Guinee as Ted (season 1), (Note: Guinee was only credited as main cast in the first two episodes of season 1.) a Marine and a friend of Axel Miller.
- Laura Mennell as Rebecca (seasons 1–2), an ancient, high-ranking vampire who sees very little use in human life.
- Paul Johansson as Dmitri (seasons 1–2), a vampire turned long before the Rising.
- Missy Peregrym as Scarlett Van Helsing, formerly Scarlett Harker; (seasons 2–3, credited as "Special Guest Star"; voice-only season 5), Vanessa's sister, who shares some of Vanessa's special abilities.
- Aleks Paunovic as Julius Romanski (seasons 4–5; recurring seasons 1–3), a former vampire turned by Dmitri.
- Caroline Cave as Jolene (seasons 4–5; recurring seasons 2–3), a triage nurse in a camp of human survivors.
- Neal McDonough as Willem / Hansen, aka "The Boss" (season 4; "Special Guest Star" seasons 3, 5), the bridesman of Dracula and the ruthless head of Blak-Tek.
  - In his original form, Willem was portrayed by Dakota Daulby.
- John Cassini as Maddox (season 4; guest season 3), (Note: Cassini was only credited as main cast in the first episode of season 4. He was credited as guest cast in the final episode of season 3.) an underling of Hansen who is in charge of operations in Denver.
- Keeya King as Violet Van Helsing (seasons 4–5), Hansen's adopted daughter, whom Julius is assigned to train, and a biological daughter of Vanessa Van Helsing.
- Nicole Muñoz as Jacqueline "Jack" Van Helsing (seasons 4–5), the teenage leader of a group of survivors, Hansen's adopted daughter and a biological daughter of Vanessa Van Helsing.
- Tricia Helfer as Countess Olivia / Dracula (seasons 4–5), known as the "Dark One", who is the ruler of the vampire species and was once the countess of Transylvania.
- Jennifer Cheon Garcia as Ivory (season 5; recurring seasons 2–4), the former leader of the Sisterhood, an all-female faction of very powerful vampires.
- Jesse Stanley as Bathory / The Oracle (season 5; guest season 2; recurring seasons 3–4), a former vampire hunter who becomes one of the bridesmaids of Dracula.
- Heather Doerksen as Michaela (season 5; recurring season 4), a bridesmaid of Dracula who is the Mother and original leader of The Sisterhood.
- Kim Coates as Count Dalibor (season 5), the ruler of Transylvania and the husband of Countess Olivia.
- Dan Cade as Roberto (season 5), a vampire hunter based in Transylvania who hunts down members of The Sisterhood alongside Bathory.

=== Recurring ===
- Hilary Jardine as Susan Jackson (season 1; guest seasons 2–3, 5), Vanessa's neighbor and best friend up until The Rising, during which time she became a vampire.
- Hannah Cheramy as Dylan (seasons 1–2, guest seasons 3, 5), the daughter of Vanessa.
- Terry Chen as Brendan (season 1), the de facto leader of a group of survivors from Idaho.
- Jennifer Copping as Quaid (season 1), a member of the Portland Human Resistance.
- Ben Cotton as Campbell (season 1), a member of the Portland Human Resistance.
- Gia Crovatin as Anastasia (seasons 1–2), an ancient vampire like her brother Dmitri.
- John DeSantis as Gustov (season 1), a notable vampire from Julius' Brood.
- Sarah Desjardins as Catherine (season 1), a member of a group of survivors from Idaho.
- Christina Jastrzembska as Mama (season 1; guest seasons 2, 5), the mother of Julius, as well as a member of his Brood.
- Macie Juiles as Callie (seasons 1–3; guest seasons 4–5), a member of a group of survivors from Idaho.
- Avery Konrad as Cynthia (season 1), a young woman who survived The Rising.
- Duncan Ollerenshaw as Dr. Sholomenko (season 1; guest season 2), a human doctor, who was forced into working for Dmitri and Rebecca in order to create day walking vampires with components from Vanessa's blood.
- Rowland Pidlubny as Scab (seasons 1–4), a vampire servant from Julius' brood.
- Ryan Robbins as Taka (season 1; guest season 2), a leader of the Portland Human Resistance.
- Naika Toussaint as Sheema (season 1; guest season 2), the sister of Mohamad who is a member of the Portland Human Resistance.
- Gwynyth Walsh as Magdalene (season 1), a vampire in allegiance with Julius who, as a human, was Micah's ex-wife.
- Alison Wandzura as Nicole (season 1), a survivor held up in the Seattle Valley General Hospital until it was overrun with vampires.
- Andrea Ware as Lucky (season 2), a member of the Portland Human Resistance.
- Keith Arbuthnot as Abaddon (seasons 2–3), the first vampire elder and the oldest living vampire in existence.
- Phil Burke as Mike (seasons 2–3 (Note: Credited as a "Special guest star" in the episode "Been Away".)), Chad's boyfriend and the co-leader of a group of mostly children refugees who hide out in the woods known as the "Johnsons".
- Donny Lucas as Chad (seasons 2–4), Mike's boyfriend and the co-leader of a group of mostly children refugees who hide out in the woods known as 'The Johnsons'.
- John Reardon as Dr. Bruce Harrison (season 2; guest season 3), a human performing experiments involving vampirism in a mountain fortress. He shares a mysterious connection to the Van Helsings.
- Andee Frizzell as Abigail Van Helsing / The Boss (season 2; guest season 3), a scientist who works with Dr. Harrison, and claims to be Vanessa and Scarlett's mother.
- Julie Lynn Mortensen as Lillian "Lily" Van Helsing (season 3; guest season 4), Vanessa's great-great-grandmother, a member of the Van Helsing family who lived in the late 19th to early 20th Century, and a vampire hunter.
- Jennifer Spence as B'ah (season 3), the second vampire elder who fought against Lillian Van Helsing in the 19th century.
- Michael Jonsson as Barry (season 3), one of a group of survivors whom Vanessa, Scarlett and Axel come across in San Francisco.
- Danny Wattley as Dre (season 3), one of a group of survivors whom Vanessa, Scarlett and Axel come across in San Francisco.
- Vanessa Walsh as Marybeth (season 3), the leader of a group of survivors whom Vanessa, Scarlett and Axel come across in San Francisco.
- Kendall Cross as Frankie (season 3), a bartender in Denver who forms a relationship with Julius.
- Anna Galvin as Avery (season 4; guest season 5), who works with Hansen at Fort Collins and is very interested in finding a "cure" for vampirism.
- Richard Harmon as Max Borman (season 4), a sadistic prison warden and a smuggler.
- Luvia Petersen as Sgt. Weathers (season 5), a member of the military who interrogates Ivory and Violet.

=== Special guest stars ===
- Sara Canning as Polly Miller / Carter ("Been Away"), the anti-social member of a group of survivors in Axel's hometown, who is Axel's long-lost sister.
- Michael Eklund as Abraham Van Helsing ("Metamorphosis") and as Jacob Van Helsing ("The Prism"), (Note: Eklund was previously credited as regular guest cast when he played Jacob Van Helsing in the third season episode, "Crooked Steps".) The former is the original patriarch of the Van Helsing family who managed to previously trap the Dark One, and the latter is Abraham's twin brother, who was turned into a vampire by Hansen.

== Development and production ==
Syfy acquired Van Helsing from Nomadic Pictures in November 2015, with a 13-episode order beginning production in January 2016, and a series premiere scheduled for Fall 2016. On October 14, 2016, Syfy renewed Van Helsing for a 13-episode second season, which premiered on October 5, 2017. It was revealed during San Diego Comic-Con 2017 that series star Kelly Overton was pregnant during the production of the second season of Van Helsing.

On December 19, 2017, Syfy renewed Van Helsing for a 13-episode third season, which premiered on October 5, 2018. Syfy renewed the series for a 13-episode fourth season on December 18, 2018. After three seasons, Neil LaBute stepped down as showrunner, with series writer Jonathan Walker taking over as showrunner for season 4. On December 17, 2019, Syfy renewed the series for a fifth and final season. The fifth season premiered on April 16, 2021.

=== Casting ===
It was announced on May 14, 2019, that Tricia Helfer had been cast as Dracula in the fourth season, and that Richard Harmon, Nicole Munoz, Keeya King and The Big Show will join the series in its fourth season, in undisclosed roles.

== Episodes ==
=== Series overview ===
Season	Episodes	Originally released	
Season	Episodes	First released	Last released
1	13	July 31, 2016	December 9, 2016
2	13	October 5, 2017	January 4, 2018
3	13	October 5, 2018	December 28, 2018
4	13	September 27, 2019	December 20, 2019
5	13	April 16, 2021	June 25, 2021

=== Season 1 (2016) ===
No. overall	No. in season	Title	Directed by	Written by	Original release date	U.S. viewers (millions)
1	1	"Help Me"	Michael Nankin	Neil LaBute	July 31, 2016 (Note: The pilot episode of Van Helsing, "Help Me", was aired as a special commercial-free "preview" on July 31, 2016, almost two months before its formal television premiere on September 23, 2016.)	1.24
The body of a woman lies in a hospital room. Three vampires burst in and one bites her on the neck. She awakens and kills the other two. The one that bit her coughs up blood and collapses. Earlier in the day, Axel had been feeding Doc with his blood, whom he has locked in a cage because she has been turned into a vampire. He is interrupted by action at the front door of the hospital. It is Ted, one of his marine colleagues, who has been outside for about six months and who has returned with a collection of fellow refugees from the vampire apocalypse (Sam, Mohamad, John, and two others). They have settled in for the night when a group of vampires get through the defenses and attack. Having awoken after three years, and knowing nothing about the apocalypse, Vanessa wants to leave and Ted promises to help. They try to sneak away, but Axel stops them, and Vanessa runs onto the roof, pursued by Ted. He has done a deal with Julius to deliver Vanessa to him. There is a fight on the roof, during which Vanessa kills Ted with the knife that he had thrust through her hand. When she pulls it out, her hand heals. Later that evening, Flesh, the vampire who had bitten Vanessa crawls up the waste disposal chute, now turned human.
2	2	"Seen You"	Michael Nankin	Simon Barry	September 23, 2016	0.83
On the day of the beginning of the apocalypse, Vanessa Seward is selling her blood at a local hospital. A vampire steals blood from the blood bank, including Vanessa's, to take back to Dmitri and Rebecca. Before he does, he drinks from the blood bag containing Vanessa's blood and is turned human. He returns to the nest with the rest, alerting Dmitri to Vanessa's existence. Dmitri sends another vampire to kill her. Meantime, Vanessa steps in to help Susan, a neighbor, when she is getting hassled by her boyfriend. Later, celebrating Dylan's birthday, Vanessa is attacked by Dmitri's minion and is killed. She ends up in the morgue, where Doc finds that her condition is unusual and contacts her sister in the military. A squad of marines is sent to recover Vanessa's body. Outside, ash from a supervolcano in Yellowstone National Park darkens the skies, allowing vampires to come out in daylight and there is chaos as they turn humans in a cascade. Axel and Ted's commander orders them to protect Vanessa's body while she goes to help in the streets. Time passes and she does not return. Ted gets stir-crazy and decides to try to make it back to base with the other marines, leaving Axel and Doc. Doc is bitten as she tries to shut the door to the hospital. Axel locks her in a cage rather than killing her.
3	3	"Stay Inside"	Michael Nankin	Jackie May	September 30, 2016	0.66
In the present day, the group regard Flesh with suspicion and debate whether to kill him as he struggles with the guilt of what he did while a vampire. When vampires use John's wife as bait to try to lure the humans out, Axel kills her. John attacks him in anger and their struggle destroys a wind turbine powering their UV light defenses, leaving them with a few hours before they are overrun by vampires. Axel and Vanessa are forced to leave the hospital to scavenge parts to restore the defenses. Vanessa denies she is special but is persuaded to try to turn Doc human again, and is successful. Julius, a powerful vampire, learns of Vanessa's abilities and notifies Dmitri.
4	4	"Coming Back"	David J. Frazee	Jonathan Walker	October 7, 2016	0.62
A girl, Cynthia, is found hanged at the hospital, an apparent suicide. However, on examining her body and finding her finger was severed, Doc concludes she was murdered. Suspicion and mistrust rise among the group as they try to uncover the culprit. Vanessa and Mohamad leave the hospital in search of Dylan and Mohamad's sister, Sheema. They encounter another group of survivors, led by a man named Brendan. When feral vampires under Julius's command arrive, Vanessa stays to fight them by herself, buying time for Mohamad to flee with Brendan's group back to the hospital. Vanessa is defeated and taken away to Julius.
5	5	"Fear Her"	David J. Frazee	Jeremy Smith & Matt Venables	October 14, 2016	0.61
Vanessa is brought before Julius and reunited with her friend Susan, now a vampire. Vanessa fights her and turns her human and the pair flee into a subterranean network of tunnels, with Julius's ferals in pursuit. Mohamad's sister Sheema, a member of a human Resistance group, is captured while spying on Rebecca, but the vampire lets her go. At the hospital, Axel tries to assert control over Brendan's group while keeping the murderer's existence secret from them. An injured member of Brendan's party dies under suspicious circumstances, with his finger missing; John then reveals the murderer's existence to everyone. Enraged that Axel withheld this information, Brendan's group stages a coup and imprisons Axel's group. When Brendan threatens to eject Axel's entire group from the hospital to get rid of the killer, Mohamad steps forward and claims to be the murderer, and is exiled from the hospital.
6	6	"Nothing Matters"	Amanda Tapping	Neil LaBute	October 21, 2016	0.64
Tensions at the hospital escalate when one of Brendan's followers is nearly killed by one of Axel's booby-traps. Brendan demands Axel reveal all the traps he has set, but he refuses. The Resistance group is ambushed while attacking Dmitri's headquarters. Campbell, the group leader, accuses Sheema of betraying them to the vampires. Rebecca appears and slaughters him, rescuing Sheema. While escaping with Susan, Vanessa is bitten by mutated ferals. On returning to the hospital, they tell Brendan they will stay out of the dispute between him and Axel. However, they plot with Doc to help Axel take back control. Axel breaks free and kills most of Brendan's party, then kicks Brendan and the remainder of his group out of the hospital.
7	7	"For Me"	Amanda Tapping	Simon Barry	October 28, 2016	0.53
Vanessa's wounds fail to heal and her condition worsens. Julius's vampire hordes besiege the hospital en masse and batter down its external defenses. They then retreat and allow Dmitri's elite soldiers to enter. Doc operates on Vanessa, removing a vampire tooth that was preventing her from healing. The group prepares to make a last stand against Dmitri's forces. Nicole is separated from the rest of the group and kills herself rather than be turned into a vampire. After destroying the hospital to wipe out Dmitri's soldiers, Axel and the remaining group members escape in an armored ambulance. Mohamad watches them leave, realizing they are heading away from him.
8	8	"Little Thing"	Jason Priestley	Neil LaBute	November 4, 2016	0.61
The group heads to the Marine base where Axel was formerly stationed. There, Vanessa finds a file with her name on it, but it is empty. A man named Gorman is living at the deserted base and joins the group. Mohamad continues following Vanessa's trail. Axel then leads the group to a mysterious underground military lab called the Farm. They are forced to blast the door open, and after they enter, the entrance collapses, sealing them in. The group finds food and supplies and relaxes. A drunken John attempts to force himself on Susan, and Vanessa knocks him out. After seeing the marks John's hands made on Susan's neck, Doc suggests John is the serial killer. When the group finds a severed finger in John's belongings, he breaks free and takes Susan hostage. Vanessa then kills him.
9	9	"Help Out"	Jason Priestley	Jackie May	November 11, 2016	0.68
While disposing of John's body, Axel and Flesh discover a pile of rotting corpses. Axel admits to Vanessa that he stole and read her file back at the Marine base, claiming it was heavily redacted but stated her mother gave her up for adoption; Vanessa replies her mother died in childbirth. While searching for a feral vampire that entered the Farm, Axel and Susan discover a blood-stained laboratory. Rebecca frames a woman named Quaid for the betrayal of Campbell's group to help Sheema win the trust of Taka, a Resistance leader. While performing autopsies, Doc's hair begins to fall out and she realizes the entire facility is contaminated with radiation, and the group will die if they stay too long. Doc tearfully confesses to Axel that when she was turned, she wasn't trying to save Axel's fellow Marines from the vampires, but to save herself. Sam discovers a passageway leading to the surface, and the group evacuates. Axel remains to search for Gorman, with Doc's help. When a turned Gorman attacks Axel, a terrified Doc locks him inside the lab and flees, telling Vanessa he was killed by Gorman. Vanessa finds her file in Axel's belongings and reads it.
10	10	"Stay Away"	Simon Barry	Jonathan Walker	November 18, 2016	0.60
Vanessa and the group members come across Eden, a seemingly idyllic human community. Micah, Eden's leader, reveals he has made a truce with a vampire, Magdalene, giving her a monthly tribute of blood in exchange for Eden's freedom. Vanessa becomes suspicious of Micah after Susan observes there are many pregnant women in Eden, but no babies. Sam sees Mohamad's T-shirt and is imprisoned while searching for him. He breaks free and finds Mohamad, but strangles the man who imprisoned him in front of a horrified Mohamad. Doc confesses to Vanessa that she abandoned Axel, and Vanessa coldly tells her she is no longer part of the group. Vanessa learns Micah is lying about sending Eden's infants to a safe haven, and confronts him. Sam reveals that before being turned, Magdalene was Micah's wife, and it is revealed that Micah gives her the infants as part of the truce agreement. Micah rants that the vampires will kill Vanessa's friends and take her to Julius, but Flesh kills him. Vanessa, Sam, Susan, and Mohamad leave Eden, while Flesh chooses to stay and help the community rebuild. Doc begs Magdalene to turn her back into a vampire; to her horror, she discovers she is now immune to being turned, thanks to Vanessa.
11	11	"Last Time"	Simon Barry	Simon Barry	November 25, 2016	0.65
Julius interrogates Magdalene, learning that Vanessa has been to Eden. Vanessa and the remaining group arrive at the farmhouse where Susan grew up. They learn Susan's mother died before the Rising of the vampires, but that her abusive father did not inform her. They find an old ham radio and manage to contact a man named Gordon, who says Denver is a safe haven. The group finds Susan's father, now a feral vampire, and Susan kills him in a fit of anger. While mourning in the woods, Susan is comforted by Sam. However, he soon strangles her to death. While searching for Susan, a suspicious Mohamad discovers a collection of human fingers in Sam's belongings, proving Sam, not John, is the serial killer. He and Vanessa march Sam into the woods at gunpoint. Sam urges Mohamad to tell Vanessa "the truth," but Mohamad dismisses this as a trick. Vanessa severs Sam's hamstrings and leaves him in the woods. Vanessa and Mohamad finish burying Susan and hear Sam calling for them, saying he can hear them. Realizing he has been turned, they flee the farmhouse.
12	12	"He's Coming"	Amanda Tapping	Shevon Singh, Jeremy Smith & Matt Venables	December 2, 2016	0.50
Mohamad convinces Vanessa to go to a camp controlled by Dmitri in order to search for Sheema, rather than to Denver to look for Dylan. The vampiric Sam attacks the duo but is blinded and driven off. Sheema observes an unknown vampire helping Taka escape Dmitri's camp after he plants bombs there. Julius and his forces attack Eden, finding it abandoned. Magdalene says Doc must have warned them, and Julius kills Magdalene. While helping the Edenians flee, Flesh runs into Brendan, who takes him to Taka. Julius is summoned by Dmitri over his failure to capture Vanessa. The older vampire spares Julius's life, saying the vampires must be united in order to resurrect the "Elders." Julius's advisor, Mama, finds Sam and feeds him, restoring his sight. She demands he tell her everything about Vanessa. Julius returns to find Mama dead and her finger severed. Vanessa and Mohamad infiltrate Dmitri's camp by posing as human collaborators. They split up and Vanessa learns the supposed "camp" is a blood farm. Vanessa tries to find Mohamad and escape, but Dmitri appears, revealing Mohamad has been working with him in exchange for Sheema's freedom. Vanessa attacks the vampire but he defeats and taunts her, claiming she looks just like her mother.
13	13	"It Begins"	Amanda Tapping	Neil LaBute	December 9, 2016	0.56
Dmitri gloats over the captured Vanessa. Dr. Sholomenko, a human scientist working for Dmitri, tells Vanessa she may hold the key to immortality, to creating vampires who can withstand sunlight, and to allowing vampires to procreate. Sheema tells Mohamad she is willingly collaborating with the vampires. Horrified, he visits Vanessa and begs her understanding for betraying her. He leaves her a knife, and she attempts suicide, failing due to her healing powers. Dmitri forces Vanessa to feed on human blood to see if it affects her. The Resistance ready to assault Dmitri's citadel; Taka says they will kill everyone they find, Vanessa included, while Flesh vows to rescue her. Dmitri prepares to artificially inseminate Vanessa with his sperm. Greatly strengthened by the blood, Vanessa breaks free and grievously wounds Dmitri and battles Rebecca. Mohamad argues with Sheema, demanding she abandon the vampires and leave with him. She refuses and knocks him unconscious. Taka tells the injured Dmitri that Rebecca was his vampire collaborator; she promised him a private island in exchange for his help toppling Dmitri. The vampire replies she was lying, claiming he can make a better offer, and Taka is intrigued. Vanessa pursues Rebecca, who reveals her secret weapon: Dylan, who has been turned. A turned Axel emerges from the Farm.

=== Season 2 (2017–18) ===
No. overall	No. in season	Title	Directed by	Written by	Original release date	U.S. viewers (millions)
14	1	"Began Again"	Michael Nankin	Neil LaBute	October 5, 2017	0.46
Dylan rejects a heartbroken Vanessa. Vanessa fights and nearly kills Rebecca, however, Dylan knocks her out before she can deliver the final blow. Mortally injured, Sheema begs Mohamad to help her become a vampire, but he refuses and suffocates her instead. Flesh joins up with Lucky, a Resistance fighter, to destroy the generators in Dmitri's fortress. Rebecca urges Taka to finish off Dmitri, but she is killed by his sister Antanasia. Dmitri kills Taka, then escapes with Antanasia. Flesh and Lucky follow Dmitri's trail, but break off their pursuit after nearly being killed by a booby trap. Vanessa awakens and manages to find Dylan, but Mohamad startles Dylan and she flees. Julius vows to conquer Dmitri's citadel or die trying. Dr. Sholomenko captures Dylan. As he leaves with her, he is confronted by Mohamad and Vanessa, who kills him. As Sholomenko dies, he warns Dylan has been genetically altered and will die if Vanessa tries to turn her back into a human.
15	2	"In Redemption"	Michael Nankin	Jonathan Lloyd Walker	October 12, 2017	0.45
Antanasia and her soldiers catch up to Vanessa, Dylan, and Mohamad. Mohamad makes a last stand against the vampires to buy time for Vanessa and Dylan to escape. A mysterious masked fighter appears and slaughters the vampires, saving Mohamad. At the Resistance camp, Doc is working as a surgeon and trying to put the past behind her, when Callie, one of Brendan's former followers in Seattle, arrives at the camp. Doc discovers Callie is stealing blood packs from the camp for a vampiric Axel. Axel coerces Doc into stealing more blood and accompanying him to look for Vanessa. After learning of Doc's actions from Callie, Raoul, a Resistance leader, orders his subordinates to find and capture her. Flesh and Lucky rescue Mohamad. Dylan attacks Vanessa and flees, running into Julius. Vanessa battles Julius and bites him, restoring his humanity.
16	3	"Love Bites"	Michael Nankin	Jackie May	October 19, 2017	0.49
A flashback to 1936 reveals how Julius was turned by Dmitri. In the present day, Julius offers to let Dylan feed on him, but she finds his blood inedible. Axel begins to starve when Doc's blood packs run out, however he refuses to feed off her. Flesh confides in Lucky about his former life as a vampire, and the Resistance group confine him in a cell after they find out. Feeling guilty, Lucky breaks him out and they depart the camp with a still-injured Mohamad. Sam plays a sadistic game with a group of juvenile delinquents, forcing one of them, Felix, to help him torture the others. Vanessa kidnaps a man for Dylan to feed on. He shoots Dylan and Vanessa kills him. Realizing the situation is untenable, Vanessa attempts to turn Dylan into a human. The attempt is initially successful, but Dylan burns up and turns to ash after being exposed to sunlight. Vanessa's screams of grief awaken an ancient, slumbering vampire.
17	4	"A Home"	Jason Stone	Jeremy Smith & Matt Venables	October 26, 2017	0.46
Vanessa goes on a vampire-killing rampage after Dylan's death. She and Julius are captured by a group of "skinners," vampires who skin their victims. They are rescued by the Johnsons, a couple who take in young orphans and train them to hunt vampires. Doc ties a hungry Axel to a tree when bloodlust overtakes him. Sam continues slaughtering the juvenile delinquents while grooming Felix to be Mohamad's replacement. The masked fighter continues to follow Vanessa's trail. Vanessa comes face-to-face with Sam again.
18	5	"Save Yourself"	Jason Stone	Neil LaBute	November 2, 2017	0.37
Vanessa and Sam battle while Julius and the Johnsons rescue the juvenile delinquents. Sam gets away and murders many of the Johnsons' children. On learning of Antanasia's death, Dmitri flies into a rage and conscripts Julius's former troops into his own army. Flesh and Lucky grow closer as they and Mohamad search for Vanessa. Vanessa tracks Sam to an abandoned church and confronts him; Sam nearly strangles Vanessa before Julius arrives and stops him. Cornered at the top of a tower, Sam leaps to his seeming death; however, his body is nowhere to be found. Axel recognizes an image Doc drew from her dreams as a real place. Vanessa tells Julius of her visions of a red door: visions that Julius shares.
19	6	"Veritas Vincit"	Kaare Andrews	Jonathan Lloyd Walker	November 9, 2017	0.30
Vanessa and Julius reunite with Doc and Axel. Despite the latter being near death from starvation, Vanessa refuses to turn him for fear she might kill him. Vanessa returns to the Farm to find the red door, with Axel following her. There, she comes face to face with the masked fighter, who identifies herself as Scarlett Harker. Dmitri, who is also having visions of the red door, sends his subordinate Scab to negotiate an alliance with an all-female group of vampires called the Sisterhood. Vanessa and Scarlett explore what lies behind the red door, finding a laboratory, a nursery, and finally a playroom which triggers repressed memories in both women, revealing that they are sisters. They also uncover a mysterious key hidden behind a wall. As they make their way out of the Farm, they run into Dmitri and his horde.
20	7	"Everything Changes"	Kaare Andrews	Jeremy Smith & Matt Venables	November 16, 2017	0.35
A flashback to 1976 reveals that Dmitri was once captured and kept at the Farm as a test subject. In the present day, Vanessa and Scarlett fight a pitched battle against Dmitri and his forces. Vanessa bites Scarlett and drinks her blood to boost her strength. Dmitri threatens to kill Scarlett unless Vanessa surrenders the key, but the sisters manage to escape and trap Dmitri inside the lab. Axel threatens to kill himself unless Vanessa tries to turn him. The attempt is initially successful, however, he later collapses and Doc is unable to revive him. Scab is rebuffed by the Sisterhood's leader, Maya, who holds a grudge against Dmitri. Scab then kills Maya and assumes control of the Sisterhood. After the group buries Axel, Vanessa and Scarlett are able to hear his heartbeat and they exhume him, finding he is alive. Sam kidnaps a still-injured Mohamad while the latter is traveling with Flesh and Lucky. As Vanessa's entire group begins having visions of the Elder, a helicopter arrives and knocks them out with sleeping gas. Soldiers descend and carry Vanessa away.
21	8	"Big Mama"	David Winning	Neil LaBute	November 30, 2017	0.34
While following Vanessa's trail, Axel, Doc, Scarlett, and Julius stop at a human settlement governed by a sheriff, Walt, who invites them to spend the night. Flesh and Lucky come across Dmitri's forces in the woods and eventually manage to free Dmitri's human prisoners, including Callie and Jolene. While Walt initially seems friendly, Axel and Scarlett discover he and his deputies are vampire-eating cannibals. Revolted by this revelation, Julius kills Big Mama, Walt's cook, and Axel's group are captured by an enraged Walt and his men. Julius tells them he was a vampire, and Walt sentences all of Axel's group to death by hanging. As they are about to hang Scarlett, the Sisterhood attacks the settlement, and Walt and his men go to confront them.
22	9	"Wakey, Wakey"	David Winning	Jeremy Smith & Matt Venables	December 7, 2017	0.49
Flashbacks reveal Scarlett's childhood training as a vampire hunter under her father. In the present day, Axel and Scarlett split up from Doc and Julius in order to evade Dmitri and the Sisterhood, giving Julius the key. While taking refuge from the Sisterhood inside an abandoned armored car, Axel and Scarlett talk about their past and become intimate. Dmitri and Scab hunt down Doc and Julius. The former steal back the key after savagely beating Julius and terrifying Doc. The Sisterhood surrounds the armored car and smokes out Axel and Scarlett. During the ensuing fight, Scarlett is bitten by one of the Sisters. The bite heals instantly and the Sister reverts to a human. The last Sister kills her former companion and flees. Scarlett theorizes Vanessa's bite has awakened abilities similar to hers.
23	10	"Base Pair"	Paul Johansson	Jackie May & Michael C. Natchoff; Teleplay by : Jackie May	December 14, 2017	0.36
Vanessa awakes to find she is being confined in a scientific facility operated by an organization called Blak Tek. The Blak Tek director, Dr. Harrison, claims he is researching a cure for vampirism and believes Vanessa is the key. Investigating the facility, Vanessa finds a book suggesting Abigail, one of the Blak Tek scientists, is her mother, Abigail Van Helsing. Vanessa and Abigail have an emotional conversation, and Abigail convinces Vanessa to turn one of their vampiric test subjects, and tells Vanessa that the Elder is very important and dangerous. When the turned test subject suddenly dies, a suspicious Vanessa confronts Harrison, learning his real goal is to use the Elder's genetic material to perfect a longevity serum. Vanessa tries to break out of the facility, taking a reluctant Abigail with her. As they are on the verge of escaping, Abigail pleads with Vanessa to stay and cooperate with Harrison, and Vanessa realizes "Abigail" is an imposter. The imposter taunts her, saying Blak Tek no longer needs her since they can follow Scarlett to the Elder, and shoots her.
24	11	"Be True"	Jonathan Scarfe	Jackie May	December 21, 2017	0.49
In an isolated camp in the woods, Sam forces one of his captives, Cara, to treat Mohamad's wounds. Flashbacks reveal Mohamad and Sam first met when Mohamad saved Sam from committing suicide; and also that Sam's father boxed his ears after a young Sam attacked him, rendering Sam deaf. Sam releases Cara at Mohamad's request, but then hunts her down. Mohamad confronts Sam and tries to get him to let Cara go. Sam reveals that when they first met, he was planning to kill Mohamad, but changed his mind. Mohamad rejects him, saying no one loves him. Angrily, Sam bites Cara, and Mohamad kills her to stop her from turning, then kills himself. Sam tries to turn Mohamad, but he does not revive. Grieving, Sam attempts to hang himself, but begins laughing when Mohamad finally rises as a vampire.
25	12	"Crooked Falls"	Paul Johansson	Jonathan Lloyd Walker	December 28, 2017	0.55
Axel and Scarlett take refuge at a weather station in the mountains at Crooked Falls. They are joined by Doc, Flesh, Lucky, Jolene, and Callie. Axel accuses Doc of abandoning Julius. Lucky and Flesh argue about Lucky's pregnancy. Feral vampires in the area begin demonstrating intelligence, the ability to cooperate, resistance to sunlight, and advanced regeneration. Doc and the leader of Crooked Falls study cellular samples from a dead feral, discovering the vampires have been genetically altered and their cells are evolving rapidly. The humans narrowly repel a nighttime assault by the ferals. The next day, a group of ferals, led by a heavily scarred vampire, brings Julius as a hostage. While battling them, Lucky is bitten and blows herself up to avoid turning. Callie fixes the radio and transmits their location to unknown recipients. After learning Scarlett's identity, the leader of Crooked Falls sets out with Scarlett to deal with the Elder. The woman reveals she is Abigail Van Helsing--Vanessa and Scarlett's mother.
26	13	"Black Days"	Jonathan Scarfe	Neil LaBute	January 4, 2018	0.48
Dmitri, Scab, and Ivory unlock the mountain tomb of the Elder, with Abigail and Scarlett following closely behind. Inside the mountain, both humans and vampires experience hallucinations of their pasts: Dmitri relives his time as a depraved disciple of the Marquis de Sade; Scab remembers being bullied and tormented by his coworkers; and Ivory recalls being burned at the stake by religious zealots, while Scarlett and Abigail see visions of the former's childhood. The Van Helsings battle the vampires before the final door to the Elder, which can only be opened by a Van Helsing, at the cost of his/her life. Dmitri gains the upper hand and threatens to kill Scarlett to force Abigail to open the door. Dmitri, Scarlett, and the dying Abigail come face-to-face with the Elder. It is revealed the Elder was forced to swear fealty to the Van Helsing family, and Scarlett commands the Elder to kill Dmitri, then to find Vanessa. The Elder travels to the Blak Tek facility, wiping out all the personnel, and bites an unconscious Vanessa. She awakens, her eyes turning red.

=== Season 3 (2018) ===
All the episodes in Season 3 were named after songs by Soundgarden. In addition, the penultimate episode's title is the censored version of "Jesus Christ Pose".

No. overall	No. in season	Title	Directed by	Written by	Original release date	U.S. viewers (millions)
27	1	"Fresh Tendrils"	Jonathan Scarfe	Neil LaBute	October 5, 2018	0.39
After a brief battle, the Elder transports Vanessa into a dream world to speak with Scarlett and Abigail. Before dying, Abigail explains each Elder has a totem, and once united, the totems can release the Dark One. Blak Tek mercenaries, led by Dr. Harrison, land at Crooked Falls and interrogate the group there regarding Scarlett's whereabouts. Harrison reveals he created the scarred vampire that is enhancing the ferals into Daywalkers. Sam goes on a murderous rampage with the newly-turned Mohamad. Vanessa searches the Blak Tek facility and comes across the Abigail imposter. The imposter boasts she infected Vanessa and Scarlett with the Dark One's blood; Vanessa kills her and retrieves the Van Helsing family book from her body. Axel and Scarlett return to Crooked Falls and slaughter Harrison and his mercenaries. Their group takes Harrison's helicopter to the Blak Tek facility and reunite with Vanessa. Scarlett gives Doc some of the Dark One's blood. Vanessa, Scarlett, Axel, and the Elder set out to find the Elders' totems, while the rest of the group travel to Denver.
28	2	"Super Unknown"	Jonathan Scarfe	Neil LaBute	October 12, 2018	0.48
In a flashback to 1906, a Van Helsing ancestor, Lily, infiltrates a mental institution to locate a vampire with psychic abilities and is defeated by it. In the present day, Vanessa's group search the same mental institution, now infested with vampires, for the First Elder's totem. Scarlett turns a vampire human again. The former vampire, Dr. Karloff, tells them about Lily's death and they search for her grave. Vanessa confides to Scarlett that after the First Elder bit her, she began craving blood. She asks Scarlett to stop her if she should become a vampire. Karloff separates Axel from the group, knocks him out, and prepares to lobotomize him. Axel tricks Karloff into giving him the location of Lily's tomb, then breaks free and kills him. Vanessa and the First Elder destroy the psychic vampire and open Lily's tomb, finding a dagger and a bracelet, the Elder's totem. The Elder warns Vanessa not to take the dagger, as she is not ready to face the other Elders. Vanessa demands the Elder teach her what she needs to know, the Elder says no but that he will show her. He transports Vanessa's consciousness back to the 1800s.
29	3	"I Awake"	Michael Nankin	Jonathan Lloyd Walker	October 19, 2018	0.39
Vanessa relives the memories of her ancestor, Lily Van Helsing, in 1896 Hong Kong. She receives a message from a vampire hunter, Master Tsui, who trains her. Vanessa investigates a rash of murders, contending with Lily's overprotective husband, Edward, who disapproves of her activities. The trail leads to one of the Elders, the B'ah, whom Vanessa and Tsui engage in battle. Tsui is killed after warning that the blood of the B'ah is the antidote to its poison, and the B'ah is driven off. After learning that the B'ah fled to San Francisco, Vanessa awakens from the vision in the present day. Realizing the First Elder deliberately sent her into the vision hoping she would die, she kills it in order to prevent it from betraying her.
30	4	"Rusty Cage"	Michael Nankin	Jackie May	October 26, 2018	0.42
Sam remembers some of his former life when his father, whom he had stabbed in the eye after receiving a beating, placed him in the juvenile correctional center. He was bullied by other inmates, but protected by one of the correctional officers. Sam eventually exacts revenge on his tormentors and also kills his protector. In both past and present, he sees visions of a mysterious woman. In the present, he is told by her that it is time for his destiny but that Mohammad must be worthy to accompany him to the Elder's presence. Mohammad is unable to control his urge to feed. Sam tries to teach him, by tracking down some of the Johnsons. Mohammad loses control while chasing Felix into the underground shelter the Johnsons have set up. Felix escapes out the second exit. Sam decides that Mohammad is irredeemable and locks both exits, trapping Mohammad. He turns Felix and teaches him to control his impulses, making him worthy of going to the Elder.
31	5	"Pretty Noose"	Jason Priestley	Jeremy Smith & Matt Venables	November 2, 2018	0.46
In San Francisco, Vanessa and Scarlett split up from Axel so that the former can hunt for the B'ah, and the latter can help a group of soldiers find their missing squadmates. Doc, Julius, Flesh, and Jolene arrive at Denver, which is a thriving, prosperous human community. Flesh is furious at being forced to share quarters with Julius, his former vampire master. Doc and Jolene begin a romantic relationship. Vanessa and Scarlett battle the B'ah's vampires and Scarlett is poisoned. Vanessa futilely searches for the B'ah in order to use its blood to cure Scarlett. Axel's group find the missing soldiers lying dead, and they are ambushed by the B'ah.
32	6	"Like Suicide"	Jason Priestley	Jeremy Smith & Matt Venables	November 9, 2018	0.42
The B'ah tries to turn Axel, but discovers that he is immune. She decides to use him as bait for Vanessa, sending her his dog tags covered in his blood. Vanessa tracks them down and kills the ninja vampires before she and Axel dispatch the Elder, providing them with the blood needed as the antidote to the poison in Scarlett. Meanwhile, in Denver, Doc learns that the "vampire repellent" vaccine is causing violent tendencies in the population, including Jolene. Flesh, who wants to be called by his real name Phil, gets depressed and shoots himself in front of a crowd in a bar, but comes back to life. Julius learns that Phil's wife is in Denver, but this information is not enough to stop Phil jumping off a tall building. Axel volunteers to help a group of survivors from San Francisco make it to Denver, while Vanessa and Scarlett head off on their mission to take down more Elders.
33	7	"Hunted Down"	Leslie Hope	Neil LaBute	November 16, 2018	0.36
Scab is inducted into the Sisterhood in a painful ceremony. Mohammad begins having visions of Cara, and breaks out of captivity by using a crowbar to pry open the walls of the shelter; the vision then directs him to kill Sam. Sam is again visited by visions of the mysterious woman, now revealed to be the Sisterhood's oracle, and told he must kill the one he loves. He murders Felix, but the oracle mocks him, saying Felix is not the one he loves. Axel's group comes across another party of humans whose truck has broken down. After Axel kills their hostile leader, they join his group on the way to Denver. Ivory and Scab slaughter the scarred vampire and seize control of the Daywalker horde, forcibly inducting them into the Sisterhood before deciding to march for Denver to feed on the humans there.
34	8	"Crooked Steps"	Jonathan Scarfe	Neil LaBute	November 23, 2018	0.35
Following a map in the Van Helsing family book, Vanessa and Scarlett travel by boat to an island in search of the Third Elder. To their surprise, they discover he is Jacob Van Helsing, brother of their ancestor Abraham, and that his totem is the vial of the Dark One's blood that Scarlett wears. Vanessa feeds him some of her blood, but he does not turn, and takes refuge in a nearby forest. The sisters split up to search for him; Scarlett encounters him and he tells her that only one of the sisters "will make it to the end." The sisters reunite and try to cut off Jacob before he can reach their boat. Jacob attacks Vanessa and drinks her blood; she counterattacks and tears his body apart with her teeth and hands, causing Scarlett to become concerned by Vanessa's increasingly brutal behavior. Vanessa tricks Scarlett, steals the totems, and strands her on the island, saying that Jacob also told her only one of them would survive and that she must insure that the survivor is Scarlett. Upon returning to shore, Vanessa murders a man.
35	9	"Loud Love"	David Winning	Jeremy Smith & Matt Venables	November 30, 2018	0.32
Axel leads his group of survivors to Denver and departs by himself to search for Scarlett. Phil, healed from his suicide attempt, learns his wife is being held in a prison called "Loveland" which is off-limits to civilians. He shoots a guard so that he will be arrested and sent there. Julius becomes intimate with his boss, Frankie. One of Denver's leaders, Caitlyn, has Jolene imprisoned in order to coerce Doc into eliminating the side effects of the anti-vampire repellant. Instead of cooperating, Doc analyzes the Dark One's blood and arranges for Caitlyn to be killed by a vampire. Ivory, Scab, and the Sisters infiltrate Denver and begin attacking the citizens. During the evacuation of the city, Jolene is taken away to Loveland. Julius and Frankie escape, but Frankie is slaughtered by Scab.
36	10	"Outside World"	Jackie May	Jackie May	December 7, 2018	0.38
Vanessa is haunted by visions of the man she killed after abandoning Scarlett on the lighthouse island. She encounters the "Seer", who tells her that her path is in the balance and could tip toward darkness or light. She attempts to kill the Seer, but she vanishes. Vanessa then finds Mohammad drinking the blood of a wolf and chases him, intent on turning him human again. Mohammad leads her onto the roof of an abandoned abattoir, and as they struggle, Vanessa falls through and is caught on a hook. Unable to free herself, the struggle between light and dark plays out through her subconscious conjuring various people from her past. In the end, she realises that she needs to turn Mohammad so that he can free her. She entices him with her blood and he drinks. Human again, Mohammad frees her and they set off together. Vanessa tells Mohammad that it is too dangerous for him to accompany her, and makes him promise not to follow her. He ignores her, under the smiling gaze of the Seer.
37	11	"Been Away"	Jacquie Gould	Jackie May	December 14, 2018	0.34
Axel reaches the meeting point he agreed with Scarlett, a store in which he used to work as a child. While looking for food, he encounters and assists a small group of people being attacked by daywalkers, his former boss, Lorne, is among the group members, but his short-term memory is shot and within a few minutes he is introducing himself again. The group follows Axel's advice in how to deal with the group of daywalkers, but Lorne loses the plot and a group member is killed. The daywalkers are wiped out, but the remaining woman was accidentally shot in the stomach by Lorne. It is revealed that she is Axel's sister, Polly, who went missing when they were both young. She had been taken by Lorne and kept in a basement for many years. The wound is fatal. In a rage, Axel beats Lorne and shoots him dead. Meantime, Sam returns to the Johnsons to free Mohammad, but finds that Mohammad has escaped and sets out in pursuit. He comes across the Johnsons and kills one of them in front of his partner. The Seer advises him that Mohammad is with Vanessa.
38	12	"Christ Pose"	Leslie Hope	Jonathan Lloyd Walker	December 21, 2018	0.32
Scarlett eventually gets off the island and makes it to the rendezvous point she agreed with Axel. They head off together but are ambushed by daywalkers while scrounging for fuel. During the fight, Scarlett notices a man walking by with a fishing rod and fish. Axel is blinded by a shotgun backfire while fighting and Scarlett takes him to the stranger's camp, where the stranger reveals that he is unconcerned by the vampire apocalypse because he has faith that God will protect him. He helps Scarlett treat Axel's wounds, including locating some antibiotics, but Axel's fever worsens. Scarlett finds a daywalker and forces him to bite Axel, curing Axel and giving him the invulnerability shared by Julius and Phil. Scarlett and Axel head off to find Vanessa. Meantime, Phil and Joelene are on the prison bus taking them to Loveland when one of the other prisoners attacks a guard, seizing his weapon. She kills the guards and the driver, allowing Phil and Joelene to escape. They find a vehicle and head off to Loveland to find Phil's wife.
39	13	"Birth Ritual"	David Winning	Jonathan Lloyd Walker	December 28, 2018	0.38
Mohammad follows Vanessa but is captured by Sam, who takes him to the Hall ahead of Vanessa. They fight until they are frozen by the Seer, who reveals that the fourth Elder is yet to be created, that it will be either Sam or Vanessa after they sacrifice something they love. Scarlett and Axel arrive. Sam kills Mohammad. Scarlett says that her destiny is to sacrifice herself so she puts a blade in Vanessa's frozen hand and impales herself on it. Axel declares undying hate for Vanessa for allowing this to happen and leaves. The Seer turns Sam into a goat-horned Elder. Back in Denver, Doc is confronted by a senior member of Blak-Tek who forces her to work on a way to defeat the daywalkers. Julius volunteers to go with the soldiers who are going to attack the daywalkers. They enter the occupied zone and find a group of humans caged as bait, including Callie. Vanessa engages the horned Sam in the crypt, where the preserved body of Lily van Helsing lies in an open casket. Vanessa's splattered blood splashes onto Lily, reviving her. Together they confront Sam.

=== Season 4 (2019) ===
No. overall	No. in season	Title	Directed by	Written by	Original release date	U.S. viewers (millions)
40	1	"Dark Destiny"	David Winning	Jonathan Lloyd Walker	September 27, 2019	0.36
Vanessa and Lily barely survive their battle with Sam, escaping with the amulet containing the Dark One's blood. In Denver, Julius fights Scab and manages to blow him up with a grenade, severely injuring him. The daywalkers become immune to Doc's anti-vampire ammo and overrun the city. Hansen, Blak-Tek's leader, orders the remaining citizens gassed to death and retreats to Fort Collins with Doc and Julius. Upon discovering Julius's regenerative abilities, he coerces Doc into trying to replicate them. He assigns Julius to train his daughter, Violet, in combat. Sam and the Oracle begin the process of freeing the Dark One. Lily is astonished and appalled to learn that the vampires have overrun the Earth. She and Vanessa retrieve the Van Helsing family book. They are attacked by feral vampires and Lily is mortally wounded. Vanessa offers to have a vampire turn her, then turn her back with her own bite in order to heal her, but Lily refuses and dies in despair, believing the Van Helsings' struggle against the vampires was futile. Standing over her grave, Vanessa vows to defeat the darkness.
41	2	"Dark Ties"	David Winning	Neil LaBute	October 4, 2019	0.30
Vanessa comes across a group of survivors led by a teenage girl, Jack, and the two bond. After an intense training session, Violet escapes Blak-Tek to play poker, with a reluctant Julius in tow. After winning a great deal of money, she is attacked by vampires and bitten. However, her wound heals instantly and she remains human. After returning to Blak-Tek with Violet, Julius asks Doc to study Violet's blood, suggesting they have found another Van Helsing. Vanessa encounters Chad Johnson and learns he is trapping humans to feed his foster daughter, Tabby, who has become a vampire. Vanessa turns Tabby human with her blood and leaves Chad and Tabby with Jack's group, bequeathing her katana to Jack. Violet has a sudden vision of Vanessa beckoning to her.
42	3	"Love Less"	Jacquie Gould	Jackie May	October 11, 2019	0.26
A despondent Axel encounters Max, a flamboyant hedonist who offers him a job smuggling alcohol and weapons. While searching for food with Chad, Jack is bitten by a vampire and kills herself to avoid turning. However, she revives from death and the vampire who bit her is turned human again. Flesh and Jolene break into Loveland and discover Jennifer, his wife. They are caught and viciously interrogated by Loveland's warden, who turns out to be Max. After ordering Flesh shot, Max discovers the latter's ability to resurrect and decides to keep him prisoner. While dropping off cargo at Loveland for Max, Axel recognizes Jolene and Flesh but remains silent. Jack tells Chad she feels a strange compulsion to seek Vanessa, and leaves to search for her.
43	4	"Broken Promises"	Jonathan Scarfe	Jeremy Smith & Matt Venables	October 18, 2019	0.30
Vanessa renounces killing vampires in favor of turning them back to human. She has a brief vision of Violet. The Oracle, Sam, Ivory, and Scab resurrect Michaela, the ancient founder of the Sisterhood. Michaela addresses the Oracle as "Bathory" and probes Sam's mind. Violet continues to exhibit new abilities; she and Julius try to see Doc, learning she has been sent to an unknown location. Hansen strangles Julius and imprisons him. Axel tracks down Vanessa. After a vicious battle, he realizes he cannot bring himself to kill her and the two reconcile. Vanessa gives Axel a magical compass that will allow him to find her if need be and the two part ways. Hansen somehow senses Bathory, Sam, and Michaela's arrival at Fort Collins and lets them enter. Violet escapes, and Julius breaks out of his cell. Jack catches up with Vanessa, saying she still feels the strange compulsion to search, and Vanessa agrees to join her.
44	5	"Liberty or Death"	Jacquie Gould	Jackie May	October 25, 2019	0.34
In a flashback, it is revealed that one of Hansen's subordinates took the ova of a Van Helsing and fertilized them to create offspring who can then be used to raise the Dark One. In Loveland, Phil is still chained to the pylon and tortured by Max for answers. During these events, Phil is also approached by a young boy whose mother happens to be Phil's ex-wife Jennifer who is still very angry with him for what he did in the past, and at the same time stunned by Phil's ability to heal. Back at Blak-Tek, Hansen explains Violet's importance to the Oracle, Michaela, and Sam. Meanwhile, Violet is shocked to find out that she was created in a lab and wants to confront her father for more explanation. However, when she finds him, she sees him drinking human blood with the other vampires. In town, Axel tries to figure out a plan to help Phil. The plan results in Max getting shot in the head and the building being blown to pieces. Yet, Max doesn't die. He abducts Jennifer and her child, takes Axel's truck, and hits the road. Finally, after having seen her father's true self, Violet leaves Blak-Tek for good; unbeknownst to her, Sam follows her.
45	6	"Miles And Miles"	Kimani Ray Smith	Jackie May	November 1, 2019	0.35
Axel and Phil are trying to find Max, Jennifer, and her son Owen. On their journey, they get ambushed by vampires and the resulting fight alerts Max of their nearby presence. From afar, he watches the battle, when Jennifer takes Max's beloved drugs and uses them to threaten him. However, the threat doesn't last long and Jennifer gives in, but not without destroying the jar of drugs. Max becomes furious but doesn't hurt her or Owen because he needs them both alive. At night, Max, Jennifer and Owen stay in an abandoned shack. When everyone's asleep Owen sneaks into Max's room and tries to kill him but fails. Axel and Phil are captured and tortured by the vampires. Fortunately, they manage to escape and continue their journey. Max reaches a man Matty who drains the blood of fat people to trade to vampires. He asks Matty for fatty blood in exchange for Jennifer and Matty agrees. Before Max continues with Owen alone, Jennifer says goodbye to Owen and secretly slips a knife into his pocket. Shortly after, Phil and Axel arrive at Matty's compound. After saving Jennifer, she kills Matty and the three set out to find Owen. Meanwhile, Owen uses the knife that his mother gave him to stab Max in the leg just as Jennifer, Phil, and Axel arrive. Finally Jen admits to Phil that Owen is his son. They manage to save Owen and kill Max. After that, Phil tells Axel he's done fighting and wants to be with his family. Before they part, Owen gives Max's car keys to Axel so he can continue his journey.
46	7	"Metamorphosis"	Jonathan Scarfe	Neil LaBute	November 8, 2019	0.33
Vanessa and Jack are united with Violet. Violet and Jack realize they were created from Vanessa's ova. The three open a portal to an alternate realm, where Vanessa and Violet encounter Abraham van Helsing, who explains he sacrificed himself to trap the Dark One there. When Vanessa says she has no weapon to kill the Dark One, Abraham searches the Van Helsing family book, finding pages missing. Separated from the others, Jack is coerced into awakening the Dark One. Abraham returns Vanessa, Violet, and Jack to the physical world, warning them not to open the portal until they have a weapon to destroy the Dark One. Upon their return, they find Sam and the Oracle, who defeat them in battle. Sam and the Oracle begin a ritual to merge him with the Dark One. It is revealed the Oracle has been using Sam to bring back the Dark One: the latter materializes and incinerates Sam, introducing herself as Dracula. Dracula mocks the Oracle for her failures and attempts to seduce Vanessa into becoming her concubine; however, Vanessa tricks her, trapping both of them in the alternate realm. Jack holds off the enraged Oracle while Violet flees to search for the missing pages.
47	8	"The Prism"	Alexandra La Roche	Jonathan Lloyd Walker	November 15, 2019	0.32
The Oracle tries to break Jack by torture. Violet takes refuge in a train station where she encounters her lover, Lee. The Oracle, Michaela, and Hansen cast an enchantment to trap Violet's mind in an endless loop of illusion while Ivory and Scab make their way to her location; however, Hansen secretly sabotages the spell. Violet breaks free and defeats Ivory and Scab. Hansen tells a defiant Jack that he loves her and her sister, and reveals he knows the pages' location. Flashbacks reveal Hansen was once an acolyte of Abraham and Jacob Van Helsing who was turned by the Oracle; he then turned Jacob and stole the missing pages, but hid them from Dracula. Violet sends Lee to safety and resumes her search. Michaela realizes Hansen betrayed them and attacks him in rage.
48	9	"No 'I' In Team"	Michael Nankin	Jeremy Smith & Matt Venables	November 22, 2019	0.25
The day before the Rising, Jack and her school archery team are on a trip to an out of state tournament. When Yellowstone erupts and the vampires begin attacking, the team's coach is turned and they barricade themselves in their hotel room. They eventually decide to make their way to a police station, only to find it abandoned except for a single deranged officer, who shoots one of the team members by mistake. Jack and one of her teammates leave to find help at a clinic, at which point Violet calls her to say that Hansen is sending a helicopter to the hotel. The team make their way back, but are picked off by vampires before they can reach the roof; Jack is helped by a mysterious vampire, but arrives too late to reach the helicopter, which leaves without her.
49	10	"Together Forever"	Alexandra La Roche	Jeremy Smith & Matt Venables	November 29, 2019	0.23
Violet is captured by Darius, who forces prisoners to fight in gladiator games broadcast for a mysterious audience and is reunited with Julius. Meanwhile, Axel finds Jack while searching for Vanessa, and the two track down Violet to Darius' compound. Before they can mount a rescue, Scab and Ivory arrive. In the resulting fight, Julius kills Scab, while Violet turns Ivory human again. After defeating Darius, Jack and Violet send a warning to his audience, which is revealed to include the President of the United States.
50	11	"All Apologies"	Lynne Stopkewich	Neil LaBute	December 6, 2019	0.27
Violet, Axel, and Julius travel to Fort Collins to search for the pages from the Van Helsing book, while Jack and Ivory try to rescue Hansen. Jack and Ivory come across Michaela undergoing a ritual and kill her, learning Hansen has been taken away to Fort Collins. Axel and Julius divert the attention of Fort Collins's guards while Violet slips into the base. Recalling the clues Hansen gave her, Violet locates the pages and frees Hansen, who is being tortured by the Oracle for the pages' location. Axel is arrested by Col. Nicholson, commander of the base, who demands Axel tell him all he knows about the Van Helsings. Axel breaks free and persuades Nicholson to join him and Julius. They reunite with Jack, Violet, and the injured Hansen. The Oracle gloats, revealing that she plans to let Violet and Jack lead her to the Dark One.
51	12	"Three Pages"	Shannon Kohli	Jonathan Lloyd Walker & Gorrman Lee	December 13, 2019	0.21
Hansen shares his memories with Jack and Violet, revealing that he'd been plotting against Dracula ever since he was turned; his work culminated in creating the girls, who are genetically engineered to destroy Dracula. With help from Col. Nicholson, the group manages to trap the Oracle, but she's able to kill Hansen, after gloating to him that she's allowed all this to happen, so that the girls will free Dracula in the attempt to kill her. Using the instructions in the pages, Jack and Violet open a portal to the Dark Realm and enter it; almost immediately, it opens again and the girls return, severely injured but with Jack claiming that Dracula is dead.
52	13	"The Beholder"	Shannon Kohli	Teleplay by : Jonathan Lloyd Walker; Story by : Jonathan Lloyd Walker & SJ Trohimchuk	December 20, 2019	0.34
To get medical help for Jack and Violet, Col. Nicholson takes Axel and Julius to the Sunshine Unit, a top-secret project Hansen sent Doc to which is researching means of curing or fighting the vampires. Upon arrival, however, all they find is a field of strange orange dust, dead Daywalkers, and a live one which is even stronger than usual; Nicholson is killed, while Axel and Julius are severely wounded, no longer healing. Flashbacks show that when Jack and Violet entered the Dark Realm, Dracula confronted them with claims that Hansen manipulated them into freeing her; due to prior mental manipulations by the Oracle, Jack succumbs to Dracula's influence, allowing her to knock them both out. In the present, "Jack" is revealed to be Dracula, who proceeds to kill the President, take her form, and free the Oracle. Realizing what's happened, Ivory frees Violet from her hospital bed, and they try to stop Dracula from escaping, only to be gunned down by soldiers. Jack is shown to be alive in the Dark Realm but locked in a coffin.

=== Season 5 (2021) ===
No. overall	No. in season	Title	Directed by	Written by	Original release date	U.S. viewers (millions)
53	1	"Past Tense"	Jonathan Scarfe	Jonathan Lloyd Walker	April 16, 2021	0.30
Jack escapes her coffin and encounters Vanessa, who opens a portal that sends Jack back in time to medieval Transylvania, which is ruled by Count Dalibor and his wife Olivia, the future Dracula. Michaela is acting as Olivia's midwife, preparing her for becoming the new host body for the Dark One, while a still human Bathory leads a band of vampire hunters in the area. Learning Olivia's identity from a villager named Florian, Jack attacks and kills her at a festival and is imprisoned in the dungeons for it. She gloats to Michaela that she's prevented the rise of the Dark One, but Michaela counters that she's only changed things slightly, and will be executed at dawn the next day.
54	2	"Old Friends"	Jonathan Scarfe	Jackie May	April 23, 2021	0.20
Jack is hanged for killing Olivia, but when Michaela sends two Sisterhood vampires to recover her body, they find that she's survived thanks to her healing ability; she turns Florian's sister Alexandra, human again and Bathory shows up and kills the other. The amulet is in the possession Bathory, which is told to be a family heirloom that has been passed down through the generations, implying that Bathory is a Van Helsing. Michaela resurrects Olivia as an undead in preparation for making her the host of the Dark One, causing Dalibor to lock her away in the dungeons. Jack allies with Bathory, and upon learning of Michaela's plans to raise the Dark One she lures her into a trap by communicating with her via the mark on her arm. Unfortunately, Jack realizes too late that her confrontation with Michaela is an illusion meant to distract her, and at the castle the Sisterhood successfully conducts the ritual, turning Olivia into the Dark One.
55	3	"Lumina Intunecata"	Jonathan Scarfe	Jonathan Lloyd Walker	April 30, 2021	0.23
The Dark One asserts her dominance over Michaela, then blocks out the sun with a veil of darkness so that the Sisterhood can hunt Jack's group and the other humans in the area. She also kidnaps Dalibor's son Kristof in order to coerce him into joining the hunt for Jack. Instead, he allies with Jack and Bathory, helping them lure Michaela into a trap where he decapitates her. Jack then leads the hunters into storming the castle, with her and Bathory going after Dracula with ancient scrolls containing spells to defeat the power of the Dark One. During the batter Jack manages to drain some of Dracula's power into the amulet that will eventually belong to the Van Helsings, but before she can finish Michaela - whom Dracula previously revived - injures Bathory, allowing Dracula to turn her into a vampire while Jack escapes. A mortally wounded Dalibor sets the castle on fire and hands baby Kristof off to Alexandra who renames him Jack Van Helsing. Jack leaves them the amulet and Van Helsing's book before departing for the New World.
56	4	"State of the Union"	Leslie Hope	Jeremy Smith & Matt Venables	May 7, 2021	0.27
Axel wakes up in Sunshine Unit, where he finds that everyone is dead except for Doc; as she tends to the still recovering Julius, she explains that the attempt to create a vampire-killing pathogen instead developed something capable of killing humans while mutating some vampires into a nearly-unstoppable state. After killing several in the bunker, Doc gives Axel and Julius a cache of perfected vampire-killing bullets and leaves to reunite with Jolene. Meanwhile, at Fort Collins, Violet and Ivory are being tortured due to the belief that they attempted to kill President Archer. They manage to escape and provide video proof that Dracula killed and replaced the President, and are let go by the soldiers. Violet retrieves the Van Helsing amulet and observe that the blood has been changed somehow. Dracula calls out to her and in a trance she releases some of the black smoke, but is stopped by Ivory before all escapes. Disguised as the President, Dracula declares martial law in order to increase her hold on power, after which the piece of her power returns to her. As she uses this to send a dark entity after the rest, Bathory has a vision of her death and that the Van Helsings will be responsible.
57	5	"Sisterhunt"	Kimani Ray Smith	Waneta Storms	May 14, 2021	N/A
Violet, Ivory, and the remaining Sisterhood members are making their way across the country when one of the sisters is killed by a vampire. Tracking the culprit to a farmhouse and killing it, the group soon finds themselves being attacked by the entity Dracula summoned, a hunter known as a Vanator. The remaining sisters are possessed one by one by the Vanator, who is attempting to retrieve the amulet containing the rest of Dracula's power; Ivory is forced to kill Zuma while Mira sacrifices herself leaving a guilt-ridden Ivory as the soul remainder of the Sisterhood. Left with no other choices, Violet absorbs the power into herself, using it to banish the Vanator, before returning the power to the amulet. Afterwards, while studying the Van Helsing book, Violet and Ivory find an entry and photo of Jack, added by the vampire hunters she befriended in the past. Noting coordinates hidden in the entry, the pair set off to find what Jack has left for them.
58	6	"Carpe Noctis"	Jonathan Scarfe	Story by : Gorrman Lee & SJ Trohimchuk; Teleplay by : Gorrman Lee	May 21, 2021	N/A
As Julius and Axel track Violet with the magical compass from the Van Helsing book, they encounter a group of vampire bounty hunters trying to abduct a woman. Saving her, they discover that the woman is a vampire named Nina, whom Julius met in the 1980s, when he was living as a scavenger before she encouraged him to create his own pack. She explains that the Dark One has been gathering all the vampire broods together for something big, and killing those who refuse to join her. Nina leads them to a supposedly safe refuge, which is actually her territory, so that she can feed on captive humans to regain her strength. As Axel fights off more bounty hunters, Nina attempts to steal the compass so that she can use it to bargain with the Dark One. After Julius rejects her, Axel kills her and takes back the page.
59	7	"Graveyard Smash"	Leslie Hope	Jeremy Smith & Matt Venables	May 28, 2021	N/A
The clues left behind by Jack lead Violet and Ivory to a church, where they reunite with Julius and Axel. Encountering the church's priest, they learn that his order has been protecting what Jack left behind -- a coffin containing Bathory's scrolls, and Jack herself preserved in a death-like slumber. Violet revives Jack with a bite, and Jack informs the group of her plan to turn Bathory human again so that she can complete the spell she began in the 18th century and seal the Dark One. The church is attacked by a group of vampires sent by Bathory, most of whom are killed by a passing chemical cloud, except for the leader who is mutated instead. While the humans attempt to escape through a hidden tunnel, a malfunctioning gate closes, killing the priest and trapping Violet and Julius in the church. A wounded Julius intentionally overdoses on the healing serum Doc gave him, turning him into a berserker and giving him the strength to fight and kill the mutated vampire before he succumbs to his wounds. Violet reunites with the others, and they set off to confront the Dark One.
60	8	"Deep Trouble"	Jacquie Gould	Jeremy Smith & Matt Venables	June 4, 2021	0.23
Axel, Ivory, Jack and Violet are attacked by Dracula's soldiers, who destroy their car and most of their supplies. To escape, the group flees into an abandoned mine. While making their way through the tunnels, they're attacked by a feral vampire, and in the process of fighting it off cause a cave-in that separates Axel and Ivory from Jack and Violet. Axel loses the magical compass map. As they look for an exit, Jack and Violet find a young girl who has been living in the mine, and realize that the vampire is her father, promising her that they'll help him. They reunite with Axel and Ivory just as they're about to kill the vampire, chasing it off instead. Jack and Ivory go to lure out the vampire and turn him human again, only for him to attack the group instead and then nearly have to kill him before Jack can bite and turn him. Afterwards, as the father and daughter choose to stay in the mine for safety, the group decides to split up to reach Washington, with Jack and Ivory going one way while Violet and Axel go another to lure Dracula's forces away.
61	9	"The Doorway"	Alexandra La Roche	Neil LaBute	June 11, 2021	0.14
Axel falls asleep as he and Violet make camp and finds himself at a farm, where he finds Vanessa laying injured after a shadowy figure stopped her from going through a doorway. As he helps Vanessa recover, she explains that they're in a part of the Dark Realm that has been designed to torment Vanessa with the memory of all the people she's failed to save. Talking with Axel, however, helps her realize that she in fact subconsciously created this place as a means of escaping the Dark Realm through the door, and that the figure guarding it is a manifestation of her own inner darkness. Accepting this, she absorbs the darkness into herself and opens the door. She then sends Axel back to his body before emerging from the Dark Realm into Washington, D.C., disguising herself as Nina in order to get close to Dracula and wait for the others to arrive.
62	10	"E Pluribus Unum"	Jacquie Gould	Jonathan Lloyd Walker	June 18, 2021	N/A
While making their way to Washington, Axel and Violet meet a young man named Aaron who asks for their help before being apparently abducted by a group of bikers led by a man named Hopper. Tracking the group to their hideout, they're shocked to learn that Aaron is the son of former President Davis Park, who was thought to have died in the Rising but has actually been a feral vampire this entire time, being kept in a cage by his son. The suspicious bikers, who are actually Aaron's bodyguards, confront Violet and Axel, but fail to stop Violet from biting Davis, returning his humanity. Aaron wants his father to use the Nuclear football to contact help in the Pentagon to both fight Dracula and to find Aaron's mother and sister, who disappeared in the Rising; however, emotionally broken, Davis tells his son that he got word of their deaths just before being turned. Refusing to believe this, Aaron runs off accompanied by Violet to track his family using a GPS tracker from the football. While the adults are tracking the pair, Hopper is killed protecting Davis from a vampire; when he and Axel find Aaron and Violet at the crash site of their family's motorcade, overlooking their bodies, he declares his renewed intent to fight back. He then uses the football to contact a friend at the Pentagon.
63	11	"Undercover Mother"	Jacquie Gould	Jackie May	June 18, 2021	N/A
Meeting a member of Hopper's group left behind by Axel to greet them, Jack and Ivory are smuggled past the defensive wall into Washington, which Dracula has turned into a police state. Finding a message from Vanessa, they are then contacted by a local resistance group that has been organized to oppose Dracula, including Sergeant Weathers from Fort Collins and a Roma descended from Bathory's clan, who recognizes Jack from the story of her exploits in the past. Meanwhile, Vanessa, still disguised as Nina, arrives at the White House just as Dracula executes all the vampire brood leaders as a show of force, and claims that she's killed Violet to win Dracula's favor. Later meeting with Jack, Vanessa prepares a trap by telling Dracula and Bathory where the resistance is hiding, only for Dracula to keep her at the White House while sending Bathory to attack the hideout sooner than expected. Aided by vampire special forces operatives, Bathory attacks and nearly claims the amulet from Jack before Vanessa remotely takes control of the other vampires and makes them attack Bathory; this gives Jack the opening to bite Bathory, making her human again but leaving her blind and seemingly psychotic. Sensing this, Dracula realizes Vanessa's deception and attacks her, with Vanessa retaliating by biting her.
64	12	"The Voices"	Alexandra La Roche	Jackie May	June 18, 2021	0.24
Vanessa's bite fails to turn Dracula human again, but weakens her enough for her human host, Olivia, to fight her for control, which gives Vanessa an opportunity to escape. Reuniting with Violet and Axel, they join Jack with the resistance and learn that Bathory is still unstable. Axel goes with soldiers to rescue to the Vice-President, who has been detained by Dracula's vampires; while he's initially skeptical of their claims about Dracula impersonating the President, they eventually convince him and he arranges to have the White House secretly emptied of human personnel in order to clear a path to Dracula. Meanwhile, Vanessa drains the darkness from Bathory, restoring her sight and sanity, and allowing Jack to convince her to help use the scrolls to seal Dracula. However, Dracula regains control of herself and remotely takes control of Bathory to make her attack Jack and steal the amulet from her, opening it and freeing Dracula's stolen essence; horrified by this, Bathory jumps off a rooftop to avoid falling under Dracula's control again. At the White House, Dracula is restored to her full power and begins bringing about a permanent night.
65	13	"Novissima Solis"	Michael Nankin	Jonathan Lloyd Walker	June 25, 2021	0.15
Vanessa uses the Dark One's mark on Bathory's body to connect with Dracula's mind, making contact with Olivia. Afterwards, she reveals that she pulled the knowledge of how to read the scrolls from Bathory's mind, meaning that the heroes' plan could still work. While the resistance stays behind to protect President Park and Aaron, the Van Helsings, Axel and Ivory heads to the White House; however, Dracula senses them coming and unleashes an energy that turns every human in the area (excluding the Van Helsings and cured vampires) into vampires. Axel and Ivory rush back to protect the Parks, while the Van Helsings storm the White House, fighting their way through the vampiric Delta Force soldiers protecting it. Confronting Dracula in the Oval Office, she initially overpowers them, until Olivia starts fighting her for control of her body. This gives Vanessa time to paralyze Dracula with the scrolls and allow Jack and Violet to bite her, forcing the Dark One's essence out; with the amulet destroyed during the fighting, Vanessa sacrifices herself to trap the Dark One in her own body, putting herself in a death-like coma. With the Dark One sealed away, daylight returns and the vampires all become human again, with President Park being reinstated in order to begin rebuilding society. While Jack and Violet help the freed Olivia adapt to modern life, Axel stands guard over Vanessa's body, and in her mind Vanessa is reunited with the spirits of Susan and Dylan.

== Broadcast and release ==
Syfy aired a commercial-free preview of the pilot on July 31, 2016; this was followed by the series premiere on September 23, 2016.

The series was originally slated to premiere in Canada on Super Channel, but because of Super Channel's ongoing bankruptcy proceedings, the series was ultimately dropped from their schedule and instead premiered on Netflix on December 23, 2016.

== Reception ==
On Rotten Tomatoes, season 1 reported an 82% approval rating based on 11 critic reviews. The website's critics consensus reads, "Van Helsing incorporates relatable performances and tried and true sci-fi tropes into a strong fallen-society storyline, though it might benefit from additional action sequences." On the review aggregator website Metacritic, which uses a weighted average, season 1 received a score of 54 out of 100 based on 5 critics, indicating "mixed or average reviews".

The series' pilot episode received 4.5 stars from Den of Geek. In his review of Van Helsing, Keith Uhlich of The Hollywood Reporter wrote: "It's pretty good... or is at least, to quote that old critic's saw, 'better than it has any right to be'."

== Awards and nominations ==
Year	Award	Category	Nominee	Result	Ref.
2017	Leo Awards	Best Direction in a Dramatic Series	Simon Barry for "Last Time"	Nominated	
2017	Leo Awards	Best Screenwriting in a Dramatic Series	Simon Barry for "Last Time"	Nominated	
2017	Leo Awards	Best Visual Effects in a Dramatic Series	John Gajdecki, Ryan Epp, Steve Desroches, Brae Norwiss, Shawn Duddridge for "Seen You"	Nominated	
2017	Leo Awards	Best Make-Up in a Dramatic Series	Jayne Dancose for "Stay Inside"	Nominated	
2017	Leo Awards	Best Stunt Coordination in a Dramatic Series	Kimani Ray Smith for "It Begins"	Nominated	
2017	Leo Awards	Best Supporting Performance by a Female in a Dramatic Series	Hillary Jardine for "Last Time"	Nominated	
2017	Leo Awards	Best Lead Performance by a Male in a Dramatic Series	Jonathan Scarfe for "Help Me"	Won	
2017	Leo Awards	Best Lead Performance by a Male in a Dramatic Series	Christopher Heyerdahl for "Last Time"	Nominated	
2017	Leo Awards	Best Lead Performance by a Female in a Dramatic Series	Rukiya Bernard for "Seen You"	Nominated	

== See also ==
- List of fantasy television programs
- List of horror television programs
- List of vampire television series
- List of science fiction TV and radio shows produced in Canada
