= Walton Ford: Tigers of Wrath, Horses of Instruction =

Monograph about Walton Ford

- Author: Steven A. Katz, Dodie Kazanjan
- Publisher: Abrams Books
- Publication date: 1994

Walton Ford: Tigers of Wrath, Horses of Instruction (the title is a quotation from William Blake) is a monograph about the New York-born artist Walton Ford. Its introductory text, "Walton Ford: A Personal History of his Work" was written by Steven A. Katz and its concluding interview, "A Conversation with Walton Ford," was conducted by Dodie Kazanjian.

The book was published by Abrams Books in 1994.
