= Dirty Weekend (2015 film) =

2015 film by Neil LaBute

- Teaser poster
- Directed by: Neil LaBute
- Written by: Neil LaBute
- Produced by: Duncan Montgomery; Tiller Russell; Joey Stewart
- Starring: Matthew Broderick; Alice Eve; Phil Burke
- Cinematography: Rogier Stoffers
- Edited by: Joel Plotch
- Production company: Horsethief Pictures
- Distributed by: Falcon Films; K5 International
- Release dates: April 19, 2015 (Tribeca Film Festival); September 4, 2015
- Running time: 93 minutes
- Country: United States
- Language: English

Dirty Weekend is a 2015 comedy drama film written and directed by Neil LaBute and starring Matthew Broderick, Alice Eve, and Phil Burke. Produced by Duncan Montgomery, Tiller Russell, and Joey Stewart, with Executive Producers Cody Davis, Jack Selby & James Jackson Leach. Shot in Albuquerque, New Mexico.

== Plot ==
Les Moore (Broderick) is a businessman who finds himself delayed in a city where a year earlier a few too many drinks led to an unexpected encounter that has since haunted him. He sets out with his co-worker Natalie Havington (Eve) to figure out what really happened.

== Cast ==
- Matthew Broderick as Les Moore
- Alice Eve as Natalie Havington
- Phil Burke as Cabbie
- Gia Crovatin as Dylan Price
- Rob Tode as Flight Attendant

== Production ==
Duncan Montgomery, Tiller Russell, and Joey Stewart produced the film while Neil LaBute directed and wrote the script. In November 2013, K5 International signed on to distribute worldwide.

The film was executive produced by Cody Davis, Jack Selby and James Jackson Leach.

Filming took place in Albuquerque, New Mexico in fall 2013.

== Reception ==
Critical response aggregator Rotten Tomatoes gave the film a 30% approval rating based on 27 reviews, with an average rating of 4.25/10. Metacritic reports a score of 39/100 based on 16 critics, indicating "generally unfavorable" reviews.
