= Jennifer Cheon Garcia =

Canadian actress, notable for ongoing role in The Wheel of Time tv series

- Born: Langley, British Columbia, Canada
- Occupation: Actress
- Known for: The Wheel of Time (2021–present); Van Helsing (2017–2021)

Jennifer Cheon Garcia is a Canadian actress known for her appearances in The Wheel of Time and Van Helsing TV series. She is of Indigenous Mexican and Korean heritage, and is a New Zealand resident. In 2016, Garcia won a Leo award for Best Actress for her part in the web series The Drive. She has also guest-starred in Batwoman and Supergirl.

Besides her television work, Garcia is a Taekwondo, Muay Thai, Jiu Jitsu, and Capoeira practitioner. She is married to director and screenwriter Jesse Warn, with whom she worked on Supergirl.

== Filmography ==
=== Television ===
Year	Title	Role	Notes	Ref.
2021–2025	The Wheel of Time	Leanne	Recurring role	
2022	The Imperfects	Sonja Benning	2 episodes	
2017–2021	Van Helsing	Ivory	Main role (season 5); recurring role (seasons 2–4)	
2015–2017	The Drive	Gina Salvino	Main role	
