= Steven A. Katz =

American writer (born 1959)

Steven Katz
- Born: October 8, 1959 (age 67); United States
- Education: Brown University; Columbia University
- Occupation: Screenwriter

Steven Katz (born October 8, 1959) is an American writer best known for his work on Shadow of the Vampire. He received a B. A. in English and Art History from Brown University in 1982 and an M. A. in English from Columbia University in 1984. He currently lives in New York City.

== Screenplays ==
- 1992-1994 Fallen Angels writer of episodes Since I Don't Have You and Tomorrow I Die .
- 1996 From the Earth to the Moon writer of episode Can We Do This? .
- 2000 Shadow of the Vampire
- 2007 Wind Chill (with Joseph Gangemi).
- 2014-15 The Knick Supervising producer, Co-executive producer, writer of episodes "They Capture the Heat", "The Golden Lotus", "Whiplash" and "Not Well At All".
- 2017 Manhunt: Unabomber Co-executive producer, writer of episode 5, "Abri".

== Other works ==
2002 Walton Ford: Tigers of Wrath, Horses of Instruction monograph about the New York-born artist Walton Ford

== Awards ==
2000 Bram Stoker Award for Best Screenwriter for Shadow of the Vampire.

2014 Peabody Award for The Knick.
