= Walton Ford =

American painter

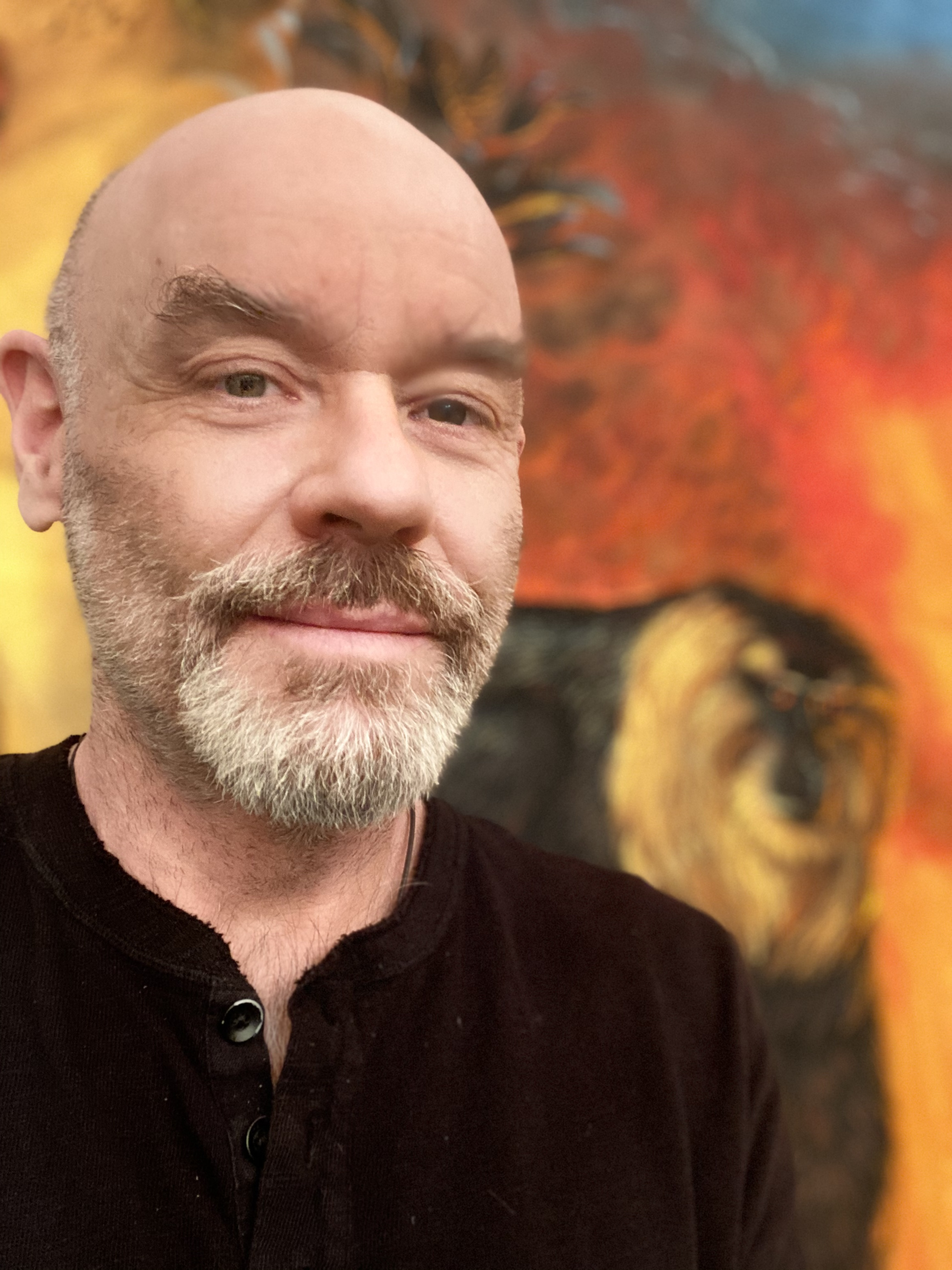
- Ford in 2020
- Born: 1960 (age 65–66); Larchmont, New York, U.S.
- Education: Rhode Island School of Design
- Known for: Watercolor painting
- Children: Lillian Ford, Camellia Ford

Walton Ford (born 1960 in Larchmont, New York) is an American visual artist who makes paintings and prints in the style of naturalist illustrations, often depicting extinct species. In his more recent series of work such as shown in his 2025 "Tutto" exhibition at Gagosian Gallery in New York City, he has taken a more painterly approach. Each of his paintings is a meticulous, realistic study in flora and fauna, and is filled with symbols, clues, and jokes referencing texts ranging from colonial literature, to folktales, to travel guides. The paintings are complex allegorical narratives that critique the history of colonialism, industrialism, politics, natural science, and humanity's effect on the environment.

== Early life and career ==
Ford recalled taking trips into the deep forest in Canada with his father as a child, exposing him to unspoiled wilderness. As a teenager, Ford became immersed in the underground cartoons of the 1960s, including ZAP and anything by Robert Crumb, whom he considers "a major influence".

He attended the Rhode Island School of Design, Providence, Rhode Island, and in 1982 was granted a BFA degree in Filmmaking.

He had his first major one-man show at the Brooklyn Museum in 2006 and is currently represented by the Gagosian Gallery in Manhattan. In 2010, the retrospective "Walton Ford: Bestiarium" traveled from the Hamburger Bahnhof Museum Fur Gegenwart in Berlin to the Albertina in Vienna, finishing at the Louisiana Museum of Modern Art in Denmark in 2011.

His work is included in the permanent collections of the Honolulu Museum of Art, the National Museum of Wildlife Art, the Museum of Modern Art in New York, the Smithsonian American Art Museum, and the Whitney Museum of American Art. In 2012, Ford designed the cover art for the Rolling Stones greatest hits album, GRRR!, which commemorated the band's 50th Anniversary.

Ford is the recipient of several national awards and honors including a fellowship from the John Simon Guggenheim Memorial Foundation and the National Endowment for the Arts and is one of the artists profiled on the PBS series Art:21. Ford lives and works in New York City.

In 2024 Ford was the subject of an exhibition, Walton Ford: Birds and Beasts of the Studio, at the Morgan Library & Museum.

== Example works ==
Dying Words, 2005, color etching, aquatint and drypoint on paper by Walton Ford, Honolulu Museum of Art

Tur, a 2007 large-scale work in the Smithsonian American Art Museum, depicts the aurochs, a prehistoric bull that gave rise to modern day cattle. The Latin inscription at the top left of the painting reads: "The Polish call me tur, the Germans call me aurox, and the ignorant call me bison." Another artwork in the same museum, Visitation, from 2004, depicts a large flock of passenger pigeons gorging themselves in a field strewn with fruit and nuts. The birds’ ravenous feasting on the bounty of the land can be seen to symbolize the exploitation of natural resources perpetrated by European settlers in the New World, which ultimately led to the extinction of their species.

Dying Words from 2005 is a combination color etching, aquatint, and drypoint on paper in the collection of the Honolulu Museum of Art. In this print, the extinct Carolina parakeet replaces people in Benjamin West's famous painting, The Death of General Wolfe.

== Quotes ==
Walton Ford appropriates the crisp, descriptive style of 19th-century naturalists and artists—John James Audubon, Karl Bodmer, George Catlin—but he puts their conventions to work in an investigation of natural history itself. Repurposing a field-guide aesthetic, Ford composes dense allegories that make sometimes pointed, sometimes sidelong allusions to everything from conservationism and consumption to war, politics and imperialism. While staying uncannily faithful to the natural history mode, Ford paints on a much larger scale, producing outsize watercolors with epic compositions. He renders his scenes with operatic drama, capturing moments when the natural order changes, such as the last member of a species struggling just before extinction.

== Monographs ==
- Walton Ford: Pancha Tantra, Taschen Books, Köln, Germany 4th edition: 2020 ISBN 978-3-8365-7815-8
- Walton Ford, Flammarion, 2015 ISBN 9782081368149
- Walton Ford: Tigers of Wrath, Horses of Instruction Harry N. Abrams Book, 2002
