= Phil Burke =

Canadian actor (born 1982)

Phil Burke (born 1982) is a Canadian film, television and stage actor, best known for his role as Irish immigrant Mickey McGinnes on the AMC television series, Hell on Wheels.

== Career ==
Burke appeared in the 2015 film Dirty Weekend. He also has appeared in a comedic role as thoughtless, hapless husband named "Dual-Bag" in series of television commercials titled "The Doghouse" for retailer JCPenney. He also starred as Cooper in an episode of Chicago P.D.

== Filmography ==
=== Film ===
Year	Title	Role	Notes
2005	Hotties	Cop #1	
2007	Zombie Town	Denton	
2007	Day Zero	Second Gay Man	
2007	Gratuitous Violence	Carlton	
2008	100 Million BC	Stubbs	
2008	Ibid	Joey Moroni	
2009	Bad Apples	Benji	
2012	This Is 40	Hockey Player	
2013	What Would Bear Do?	Willie	
2015	Don't Worry Baby	Marc	
2015	Dirty Weekend	Skip the Cabbie	
2015	Wind Walkers	Kelly Sturgis	
2015	Legend of the Lich Lord	Azurus, the Wizard	
2016	Catch 22: Based on the Unwritten Story by Seanie Sugrue	Dude	
2017	Cut Shoot Kill	Blake Stone	
2018	Ask for Jane	Gary	
2019	Toss It	Finn	
2020	Paint	Dutch	
2021	Silk Road	Agent Conroy	
2021	Hunters	John T. Wrecker	
2021	Apache Junction	Boone Higgins	
2022	Bread and Games	Kevin	
2023	Hey, Viktor!	Chomsky	
2027	Twilight of the Dead †		Post-production

=== Television ===
Year	Title	Role	Notes
2006	Law & Order	Tadhg Ruane	Episode: "Heart of Darkness"
2010	Mercy	Reverend Todd	2 episodes
2011–2016	Hell on Wheels	Mickey McGinnes	49 episodes
2012	The Good Wife	Cameron Raker	Episode: "Gloves Come Off"
2013–2018	One Hit Die	Azurus, the Wizard	8 episodes
2014	Space Janitors	Krayne	2 episodes
2015	Chicago P.D.	Cooper	Episode: "What Puts You on That Ledge"
2015	The Knick	Doctor	2 episodes
2015–2016	Billy & Billie	Tom	9 episodes
2017–2018	Van Helsing	Mike	3 episodes
2020	The Good Lord Bird	Harry Redshirt	Episode: "Meet the Lord"
