= Zuzanna Szadkowski =

Polish-American actress (born 1978)

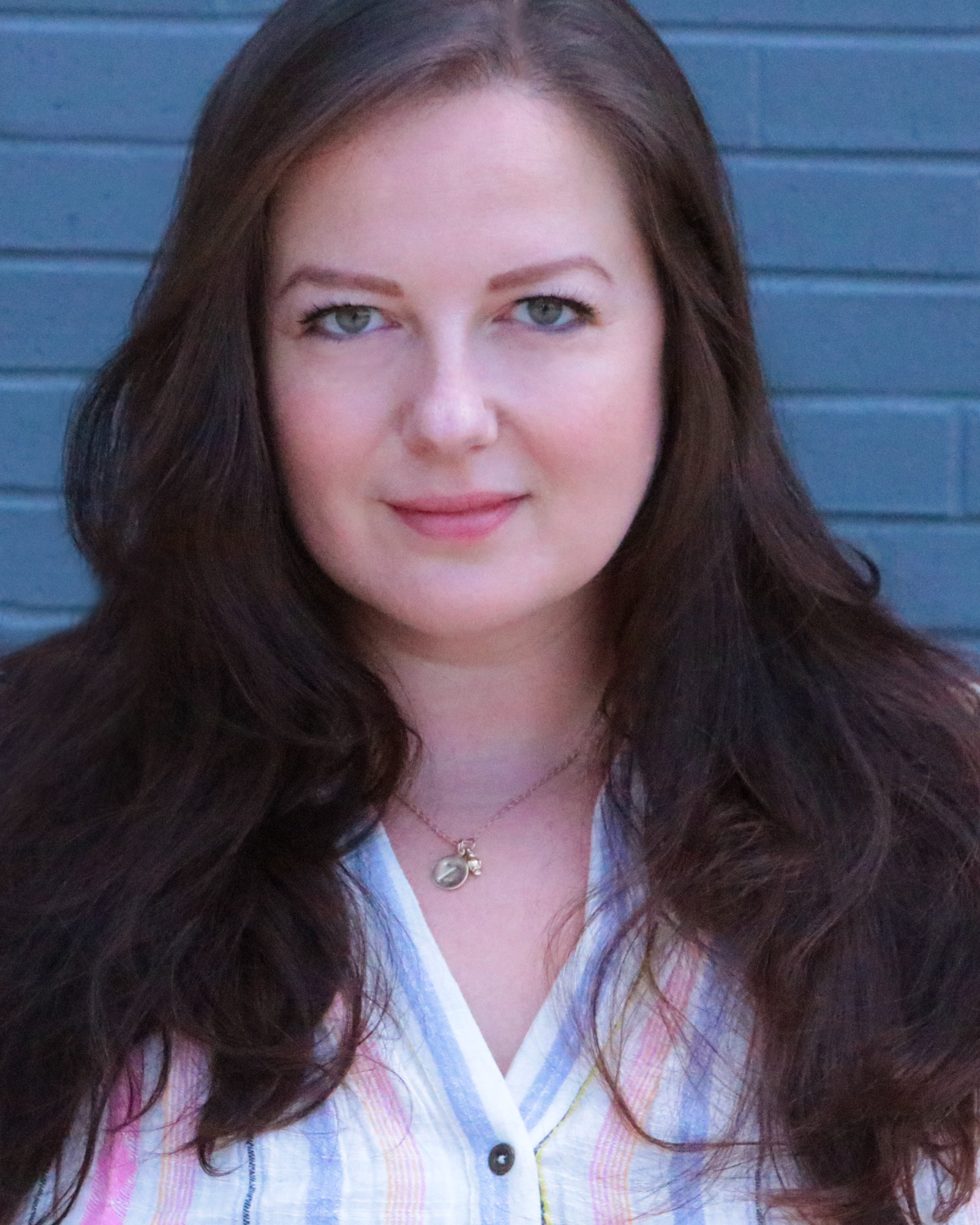
- Born: October 22, 1978 (age 47); Warsaw, Poland
- Education: Barnard College (BA); Harvard University (MFA)
- Occupation: Actress
- Years active: 2004–present

Zuzanna Szadkowski ([ʂatˈkɔfski]; born October 22, 1978) is a Polish-American actress known for her role as Dorota Kishlovsky on CW teen drama series Gossip Girl. Szadkowski also appeared on The Gilded Age, The Knick, Girls, Search Party, The Good Wife, The Sopranos, and Guiding Light. She made her New York Stage debut in Nora Ephron and Delia Ephron's Love, Loss, and What I Wore in which she appeared in a record-breaking five all-star casts.

== Early and personal life ==
Zuzanna Szadkowski was born on October 22, 1978, in Warsaw, Poland, and moved to the United States when she was three. About her national identity and Polish accent, she displays in Gossip Girl, she said, "I was born in Poland, so I am able to identify with her that way. The accent is modeled after people in my own family, so hopefully I am doing it justice". Szadkowski is a YoungArts alumnus. In 1997, she was named a Presidential Scholar of the Arts as part of the 1997 U.S Presidential Scholars Program. She attended Barnard College, and went on to earn a Master of Fine Arts in acting from the Institute for Advanced Theater Training at Harvard University.

Szadkowski currently resides in Downtown Brooklyn. In 2010, she partnered with Sam Weisman to open an acting school, the Sam Weisman Studio, in New York City.

== Career ==
Szadkowski made her acting debut in 2006, portraying two characters in Law & Order: Criminal Intent season 5 episode "Watch". She would reprise these roles in the season 7 episode "Lonelyville". In 2007, Szadkowski appeared in two episodes of The Sopranos, "Soprano Home Movies" and "Kennedy and Heidi". The same year, she was cast as Dorota Kishlovsky, the Polish maid of Blair Waldorf (Leighton Meester), in The CW series Gossip Girl. On April 20, 2009, The CW launched the Gossip Girl spin-off web series titled Gossip Girl: Chasing Dorota, consisting of six episodes.

Szadkowski also appeared as Nurse Pell on Steven Soderbergh's The Knick. She appeared in Girls, Search Party, The Good Wife, Elementary, and Guiding Light. Theatre credits include Uncle Romeo Vanya Juliet (WSJ Performance of the Year 2018); The Crucible; and Peter Pan with Bedlam; queens at LCT3; The Comedy of Errors as part of The Public Theater's Mobile Shakespeare Unit; King Philip's Head... with Clubbed Thumb; The 39 Steps at Actors Theatre of Louisville; The Merry Wives of Windsor at Two River Theater; and King Lear at Bristol Riverside Theatre. Szadkowski performed a one-woman show she also wrote as part of Bedlam's online theatre festival during the COVID-19 pandemic.

== Filmography ==
=== Film ===
Year	Title	Role	Note
2011	Tower Heist	Polish Maid	Uncredited
2012	Where Is Joel Baum?	Polish Cleaning Lady	
2013	Butterflies of Bill Baker	Monica	
2015	Growing Up and Other Lies	CeCe	
2016	Loserville	Janice Rappaport	
2018	Pigeon	Nina	Short
2020	Minyan	Rivka	
2020	Worth	Myrna	
2020	Ill Feelings	Genevieve	Short

=== Television ===
Year	Title	Role	Notes
2006	Law & Order: Criminal Intent	Trina	Episode: "Watch"
2007–2012	Gossip Girl	Dorota Kishlovsky	79 episodes (1 uncredited)
2007	Law & Order: Criminal Intent	Olga	Episode: "Lonelyville"
2007	The Sopranos	Elzbieta	2 episodes
2009	Guiding Light	Sister Angelica	3 episodes
2014–2015	The Knick	Nurse Pell	15 episodes
2015	Elementary	Miranda Jantzen	Episode: "Seed Money"
2015	Girls	Priya	3 episodes
2016	The Good Wife	Gloria Beattie	Episode: "Shoot"
2017	Search Party	Aphrodite	Episode: "Frenzy"
2021	Bull	Emily Kaminsky	Episode: "Evidence To The Contrary"
2021	Modern Love	Judy	Episode: "How Do You Remember Me?"
2021	Gossip Girl	Dorota Kishlovsky	Episode: "Final Cancellation"
2022	The Gilded Age	Mabel Ainsley	7 episodes

=== Web ===
Year	Title	Role	Notes
2009	Gossip Girl: Chasing Dorota	Dorota Kishlovsky	6 episodes
