= List of The Knick episodes =

The Knick is an American television drama series on Cinemax created by Jack Amiel and Michael Begler, directed by Steven Soderbergh and starring Clive Owen. It looks at the professional and personal lives of Dr. John W. Thackery (played by Owen) and the staff at a fictionalized version of the Knickerbocker Hospital ("the Knick") in New York during the early part of the twentieth century. The series premiered on Cinemax on August 8, 2014. In March 2017, Cinemax announced the series was officially cancelled.

== Series overview ==
Season	Episodes	Originally released	
Season	Episodes	First released	Last released
1	10	August 8, 2014	October 17, 2014
2	10	October 16, 2015	December 18, 2015

== Episodes ==
=== Season 1 (2014) ===
No. overall	No. in season	Title	Directed by	Written by	Original release date	U.S. viewers (millions)
1	1	"Method and Madness"	Steven Soderbergh	Jack Amiel & Michael Begler	August 8, 2014	0.354
In 1900, after Drs. J. M. Christiansen and John Thackery fail to save a woman and child during placenta praevia surgery, Christiansen commits suicide. Thackery takes his place as leader of the surgery staff. His choice for deputy is his colleague Dr. Everett Gallinger, but he is asked to hire Dr. Algernon Edwards, who has outstanding qualifications gained in Europe, and has connections with the hospital's benefactor, Captain Robertson. When Thackery discovers Edwards is African-American, he refuses to hire him. The Robertsons then pull the funding for a vital modernization project for the hospital – the installation of electricity. Hospital manager Herman Barrow then hires Edwards and tells the staff that it was Thackery's decision. When a patient develops a bowel infection after surgery, Thackery is needed urgently. Nurse Lucy Elkins finds him at his house suffering from cocaine withdrawal. She reluctantly agrees to inject him, and when she finds that most of his veins have collapsed, she has to inject the drug directly into Thackery's penis. Thackery returns to undertake the high-risk operation. The patient has bronchitis and can't be etherized, so Thackery gives him a spinal block using cocaine, then repairs the bowel using a revolutionary clamp of his own design. Edwards has observed the operation, and despite the humiliations that Thackery and others have heaped on him during his first day, he vows not to resign until he has learned everything he can from Thackery. This sets up a bitter enmity with Gallinger, who believes the deputy position should be his.
2	2	"Mr. Paris Shoes"	Steven Soderbergh	Jack Amiel & Michael Begler	August 15, 2014	0.419
The episode opens with contrasting views of how the day begins for two key characters. Cornelia Robertson, the daughter of the hospital's benefactor and chair of the hospital board, breakfasts with her father in an opulent dining room surrounded by servants. Meanwhile Algernon Edwards queues for the bathroom in a seedy boardinghouse that caters to African-Americans. He manages to avoid a confrontation with an aggressive tenant who notices Edwards' expensive shoes. At the hospital, an operation is underway using a cauterizer powered by the newly-installed electricity. A short-circuit sets the patient on fire and a nurse is electrocuted. Barrow is ordered to get the contractor to repair the fault, and we learn that the job was done on the cheap because Barrow had skimmed the funds to pay his own debts to a loan shark. Edwards is given an "office" in the dank basement of the hospital. Frozen out by Thackery upstairs, Edwards opens an underground clinic for poor African-Americans in the basement. More problems for Barrow as Thackery pressures him for cadavers to practice on: competition among hospitals for bodies is pricing The Knick out of the market. Barrow goes to the loan shark Bunky Collier to renegotiate his debt and Collier rips out one of Barrow's teeth as collateral. Thackery loses a patient in a tricky operation on an aortic aneurysm. Edwards tells him of a new galvanic procedure he learned in Europe. Thackery rejects his help then sends Drs. Gallinger and Chickering to find a journal article on the procedure. They succeed (after burgling another hospital) but the article is in French. Back at his boardinghouse, Edwards has another run-in with his menacing neighbor and turns out to be tougher than he looks. He knocks the man out, tosses some iodine and bandages on his chest for when he comes to, and goes to bed.
3	3	"The Busy Flea"	Steven Soderbergh	Jack Amiel & Michael Begler	August 22, 2014	0.407
Abigail Alford (Jennifer Ferrin), a former lover of Thackery's, arrives at the hospital to ask him to examine her nose, which has been ravaged by syphilis from her promiscuous ex-husband. Thackery suggests a grueling live graft procedure in which tissue on her arm is grafted to her face. Abigail insists that it should be Thackery who performs the operation. Barrow steals a corpse from the hospital morgue and sells it to make his payment to Bunky, then goes to see the prostitute he is in love with. Algernon Edwards assembles a team to help him in his underground clinic, training a seamstress as a theatre nurse. He performs a complex repair on a laborer's severe hernia and warns him to rest. Gallinger asks for his wife's help in deciphering the French journal article on the galvanic aorta procedure, but her schoolgirl French isn't up to it. Thackery insists that they let Algernon talk them through it, on the understanding that he won't touch the patient. Algernon's hernia patient returns to the clinic, having re-injured himself at work after ignoring the doctor's instruction to rest. Algernon operates again, but the man dies on the table. Algernon goes out and gets drunk and picks a fight with a bar patron.
4	4	"Where's the Dignity?"	Steven Soderbergh	Jack Amiel & Michael Begler	September 5, 2014	0.374
Edwards talks Gallinger through a heart surgery and ultimately takes the scalpel to save the patient's life. Later, Edwards asks a vacuum cleaner salesman if the machine could be used to suction blood, only to find that his basement clinic has no electrical outlets. Thackery visits a recovering Abigail to say he understands why she left him, but not for whom she left him. He then tries to save a woman who botched a self-administered abortion. The woman's death causes Cleary to take Sister Harriet to a pauper's cemetery to show her other mothers who have died from abortions. If Harriet must perform the procedure, she would at least save the mothers' lives.
5	5	"They Capture the Heat"	Steven Soderbergh	Steven Katz	September 12, 2014	0.322
Barrow can alleviate a debt if he treats one of Collier's wounded men and also urges Capt. Robertson to buy an x-ray machine, one of Thomas Edison's new inventions. Meanwhile, Edwards tries a new approach to hernia surgery; the health of Everett and Eleanor's baby worsens; and Sister Harriet and Cleary head to Chinatown.
6	6	"Start Calling Me Dad"	Steven Soderbergh	Jack Amiel & Michael Begler	September 19, 2014	0.358
Despite partaking in a weekend-long bender, Thackery enlists Chickering's help to cure the recurring placenta praevia problem. They save a woman and her baby's life, which leads Thackery to write a paper about it. Cornelia and Speight are able to track a typhoid outbreak to a cook employed by the wealthy elite, before it spreads further into the city. Sister Harriet offers the Gallingers adoption advice when their baby dies from meningitis. Although Thackery finds and shuts down Edwards's basement clinic, he drops his plans to have Edwards fired when he finds Edwards has created a new way of operating on hernias. Edwards offers to co-author a paper on the procedure with Thackery, in exchange for being allowed to carry out his duties as deputy chief of surgery. Cornelia's future father in-law confronts her in her bedroom and makes sexually suggestive comments, which visibly upsets her.
7	7	"Get the Rope"	Steven Soderbergh	Jack Amiel & Michael Begler	September 26, 2014	0.358
Escalating racial tension within the city affects the hospital when Sears, attempting to find prostitutes for the mob, gets stabbed by a black man. Another black man is saved from a beating outside the hospital by Thackery, who then suggests hospital segregation, when Everett wants to close the basement clinic.
8	8	"Working Late a Lot"	Steven Soderbergh	Jack Amiel & Michael Begler	October 3, 2014	0.349
A shortage of cocaine puts increasing strain on Thackery as he continues his affair with Nurse Elkins, and introduces her to the drug prior to intercourse. Edwards and Cornelia continue their affair as well. Barrow faces repeated rebukes as he seeks donations to help replenish the hospital's cocaine stock, after expensive repairs to the hospital following the race riots. Chickering Sr. pressures his son to leave The Knickerbocker, despite Bertie's determination to stay working near the woman he's in love with, Nurse Elkins. Gallinger brings home an orphaned, baby girl in hopes Eleanor will respond to a new child in her care.
9	9	"The Golden Lotus"	Steven Soderbergh	Steven Katz	October 10, 2014	0.319
Thackery becomes increasingly desperate as he experiences cocaine withdrawal, and is arrested for breaking into a pharmacy. Barrow begins working to cover up Thackery's addiction, news of which has spread around town, while also trying to procure more of the drug. Cornelia learns that she is pregnant with Edwards' child and requests he perform an abortion. Eleanor Gallinger's mental health rapidly deteriorates as Everett finds her paying little attention to their adopted child, Grace. Nurse Elkins puts her own job at risk in various efforts to help Thackery.
10	10	"Crutchfield"	Steven Soderbergh	Jack Amiel & Michael Begler	October 17, 2014	0.413
Cornelia, picked up by Cleary (to her surprise), receives an abortion from Sister Harriet. After a visit from Edwards, their clandestine relationship is ended, to her dismay. She marries Philip, and Edwards is brutally beaten in a street fight. After Barrow is attacked by Bunky, he attempts to enlist Thackery's help in alleviating his debt by asking Ping Wu to kill the loan shark. Rejected, he goes to Wu anyway, feigning himself as representing Thackery's interest. Wu kills Bunky, and takes on the latter's loans. Gallinger visits his wife at the mental hospital, only to discover that the doctor has performed radical treatments for her instability, leaving her toothless. Bertie is sent by Thackery, whose obsessive competition with Zinberg borders on paranoia, to investigate the latter's willingness to collaborate on a blood transfusion theory. After Thackery unwittingly kills a girl during an experimental blood transfusion procedure, Bertie recognizes the doctor's addiction has finally reached a critical point, and asks his father to check Thackery into a recovery clinic for his cocaine addiction. There he registers under the alias "Crutchfield", his mother's maiden name. After being admitted, a doctor gives Thackery a shot, claiming it is a safe drug and will eliminate the misery of withdrawal. The drug is revealed to be heroin.

=== Season 2 (2015) ===
No. overall	No. in season	Title	Directed by	Written by	Original release date	U.S. viewers (millions)
11	1	"Ten Knots"	Steven Soderbergh	Jack Amiel & Michael Begler	October 16, 2015	0.269
Picking up in 1901, John Thackery is still in the clinic, where he is addicted to heroin and performs underground procedures on prostitutes for drug money. Algernon Edwards is the acting chief of surgery, a position he attempts to make permanent. He learns that he has a detached retina from injuries suffered while fighting in bars and the hospital board refuses to make his position permanent. Sister Harriet has been arrested in a sting operation for performing abortions, a possible 25-year sentence, and Cleary resolves to pay for a good lawyer. Cornelia is pulled back to New York by her father in law, who seeks to have Philip and Cornelia live in his home. After taking time off to care for his unstable wife, Gallinger returns and is shocked to find Edwards the chief of surgery. Hoping to return Thackery to his position, Gallinger kidnaps him and forces him to detox on a boat in the middle of the ocean. After a painful withdrawal process, Thackery is sober enough to return to shore. He has an epiphany regarding addiction and expresses his intention to treat it as a sickness and hopefully find a cure.
12	2	"You're No Rose"	Steven Soderbergh	Jack Amiel & Michael Begler	October 23, 2015	0.229
Inspector Speight is found dead in the water and written off as a drunk gone overboard. Cornelia doubts this, as Speight was a dedicated teetotaler. She attempts to recover his body to be examined and commissions Cleary to dig it up but they find the grave to be empty. In return, Cleary asks Cornelia to provide funds for Harriet's lawyer. Thackery returns to the Knick, to the trepidation of his co-workers. Bertie resigns from the Knick upon Thackery's return, transferring to Mt. Sinai, the Jewish hospital run by Dr. Zinberg. Nurse Elkins is cruelly rejected by Thackery but assigned to the awkward position of examining his body for signs of drug use. Her father, an itinerant pastor, arrives in town as well, setting up a congregation. Barrow is forced by Wu to set up a clinic for Wu's prostitutes at the Knick. A doctor named Mays volunteers to run the clinic for evidently lecherous and unethical purposes. Cornelia's father in law extends the construction schedule on her and Philip's house, forcing them to stay in his home for longer. Edwards seeks Thackery's help to perform an experimental retinal reattachment operation on him but Thackery is shaky and distracted, apparently from lingering withdrawal and unable to carry it out.
13	3	"The Best with the Best to Get the Best"	Steven Soderbergh	Jack Amiel & Michael Begler	October 30, 2015	0.202
Cleary drugs his fixed boxer with cocaine, hoping to improve his performance but the boxer overdoses and dies in the ring. Cornelia asks Philip to help pay for Harriet's defense but he refuses. Bertie courts a journalist, Genevieve, after meeting her at Mt. Sinai. She reveals herself to be the woman who went undercover at a mental institution to expose its corruption and poor conditions and also reveals that she is Jewish, working under a gentile pseudonym for greater publicity. Barrow becomes frustrated with Junia's larger client list, worrying that he is just another client to her. Junia convinces Barrow, with ambiguous sincerity, that she actually wants to spend her life with him. Nurse Elkins makes a confession of her sins at her father's church, only for him to erupt in rage later at home, beating her savagely. Thackery procures the corpse of an overdose victim and begins his research with Edwards. Agitated by Thackery's favor for Edwards, as well as his wife's continuous mental disturbance, Gallinger falls in with a group of eugenicists at a class reunion. Edwards is surprised by an English woman who arrives at his parents' home, revealing herself to be his estranged wife Opal.
14	4	"Wonderful Surprises"	Steven Soderbergh	Jack Amiel & Michael Begler	November 6, 2015	0.166
After refusing to grant Edwards a divorce, Opal moves in with him and the couple have an awkward meeting with Cornelia and her family. Opal's confrontational manner embarrasses all in attendance but most of all her husband. Dr. Mays dies in a freak operating-room accident. Barrow meets with a Tammany Hall boss, who demands 15% of the profits from all of his schemes in exchange for Tammany's protection. After his wife Eleanor is accosted by an Italian-American child beggar, Gallinger discusses the sterilization of immigrants with a eugenicist friend. Frustrated with being exploited and underestimated by the men in her life, Nurse Elkins confides to Harriet that she wants something better for herself. Bertie learns his mother is dying from an esophageal tumor and resolves to cure her, despite his father and Dr. Zinberg's opinion that the tumor is inoperable. Cornelia searches Inspector Speight's home for evidence regarding his death. Cleary blackmails his and Harriet's wealthy former clients into pressuring the judge to dismiss the charges against her. Spurred on by Abigail's worsening condition, a desperate Thackery attempts to cure her syphilis by raising her body temperature to over 107 degrees Fahrenheit, despite Edwards' objections; the treatment is successful.
15	5	"Whiplash"	Steven Soderbergh	Steven Katz	November 13, 2015	0.255
Abigail returns home, provided with quinine should her malaria return. Thackery demonstrates electrical stimulation to the brain of a morphine addicted patient, in hopes of isolating the section of the brain which controls addiction. Expelled from the Church and with nowhere else to go, Harriet lives in a women's derelict home. An overseeing nun orders all residents to snub Harriet under pain of starvation, after Harriet offered to assist another resident. Edwards suggests Pierre Curie's recently published research may hold promise to Bertie's mother. An explosion on the subway expansion on Park Avenue demands that Thackery, Edwards, and Gallinger treat multiple patients simultaneously. Nurse Elkins displays skill at triage during the crisis. Robertson informs Barrow that The Knick will waive all fees associated with the disaster, likely to protect his investment in the subway. Bertie suggests to his father a course of treatment based on Curie's research, receiving his father's approval. Robertson suggests to his father they liquidate their assets for new investments, still unaware of his son's investment in the subway. Robertson learns the subway company will need to remunerate all residents displaced by the explosion at a great cost. Cornelia discovers an immigrant Speight was investigating prior to his murder was infected with bubonic plague. Gallinger suggests to Thackery that sterilization is the best course for ridding society of drug addicts, later suggesting it at his club to the superintendent of a home for boys deemed mentally defective. Robertson and Nurse Elkins exchange a passionate kiss after dining together. Barrow's wife fails to seduce him, who leaves abruptly, humiliating her. Edwards appears spellbound by a lecturer of Black nationalism. The Chickerings are surprised upon learning that Genevieve is Jewish but Mrs. Chickering is later relieved to learn of her genuine affection for Bertie and appears to accept her. Barrow buys an expensive apartment where he intends to reside with Junia alone after settling his debt and freeing her from Wu. Thackery removes part of the brain of the addicted patient seen earlier, confident of its success but with unintended results. Dr. Gallinger is shown preparing to perform a series of secret vasectomies on a group of boys committed to the home run by the superintendent.
16	6	"There Are Rules"	Steven Soderbergh	Jack Amiel & Michael Begler	November 20, 2015	0.195
Thackery witnesses a hypnotist at a sideshow and wonders if hypnosis could cure addiction. Thackery also sees a pair of conjoined twin sisters, who perform violin music. Brockhurst, a sideshow barker, claims he "owns" them, and will allow Thackery to study them in the hospital for a fee. Bertie enlists Edwards to perform a risky procedure in secret to help save his mother, while Dr. Chickering Sr. looks away in dread. Zinberg catches them and erupts in rage, though he attempts to help once he sees the progress of the surgery failing but Mrs. Chickering dies. Bertie is comforted that his father respects his futile attempt to save his mother. Zinberg is sympathetic but furious that Bertie flouted hospital rules and allows Bertie to resign rather than being fired. Thackery gets his audience with the conjoined twins, who are from Russia. He learns that Brockhurst degrades and abuses them. After they leave, Thackery and Cleary break into Brockhurst's home. Cleary beats Brockhurst violently while Thackery removes the girls. Thackery later attempts to hypnotize Cleary into quitting smoking. Cleary plays along and eventually reveals that the hypnosis did not work as he laughs. Gallinger returns home to find that his wife has invited Dr. Cotton, the psychiatrist who pulled her teeth, over for dinner. Cotton attempts to make conversation with Gallinger, who openly expresses his displeasure at the situation. Cotton eventually experiences a stomach ache and quickly leaves.
17	7	"Williams and Walker"	Steven Soderbergh	Jack Amiel & Michael Begler	November 27, 2015	0.347
Thackery devises a surgery to separate the conjoined twins and has Henry Robertson document the three-hour surgery on his motion picture camera. Genevieve is permitted into the surgery as a reporter and eagerly takes notes. Thackery visits the grave of the girl on whom he botched the blood transfusion, revealing that he personally paid for a large, ornate headstone for her. Cornelia discovers that her father's shipyard has been paying off guards to allow diseased immigrants into the country, rather than spend the extra money to return them to their home country. Cornelia is confronted by Hobart Showalter, who menaces and threatens her for neglecting her marital duties to his son and failing to become pregnant.The hospital staff attends a ball, where Mrs. Barrow introduces Williams and Walker, a vaudeville comedy act featuring two men in blackface making fun of "coons". This angers Opal Edwards, who embarrasses Algernon by confronting the Robertsons, but they resent her misdirected anger and dismiss her criticism. Enraged that a Black patient has been admitted to the hospital, Gallinger secretly doctors a bottle of Curare to double the strength so that when Algernon injects the patient, he nearly dies. Gallinger rushes from the audience to save him, knowing exactly how to do it. Edwards is crushed by the failure and being upstaged by Gallinger and breaks down as Opal comforts him.
18	8	"Not Well at All"	Steven Soderbergh	Steven Katz	December 4, 2015	0.266
A drunken Brockhurst barges into the hospital with a gun and demands Thackery return the now-separated conjoined twins to him but he is subdued by Cleary. The hospital board stops Thackery's addiction experiments after one of his subjects dies from drinking embalming fluid. Cornelia explains the results of her investigation to Henry, including her suspicion that their father may have had Speight killed to cover up the smuggling of sick passengers past the health inspectors. Barrow buys Junia's freedom from Wu and tells his wife to move out of their home. Cleary makes romantic advances to Harriet, which she angrily rejects. Nurse Elkins's father suffers a stroke while frequenting a brothel and is taken to the Knick for treatment. When a detective comes to the Gallinger house to investigate Dr. Cotton's death, Eleanor confesses to her husband that she poisoned him and even tries to poison the detective. Gallinger has her permanently committed to a mental institution, after which he becomes intimate with his sister-in-law Dorothy. Edwards discovers Gallinger's records of the vasectomies he is performing on mentally disabled teenagers and wants him punished for unethical conduct but Thackery says he can do nothing. While being prepared for further plastic surgery on her nose, Abigail has an unexpected reaction to the anesthetic and dies on the operating table in front of a stunned Thackery.
19	9	"Do You Remember Moon Flower?"	Steven Soderbergh	Jack Amiel & Michael Begler	December 11, 2015	0.199
In a flashback, Thackery meets Captain August Robertson in Nicaragua, held prisoner and blamed for an outbreak of smallpox Thackery is summoned to treat. Thackery bargains for Robertson’s release, in exchange for treating the victims. Returning to 1901, Thackery is seen attempting to treat his abdominal pain by drinking turpentine. The separated conjoined twins take their first steps since the operation, to everyone’s delight. To his visible surprise and relief, Gallinger is informed Dr. Cotton's sons are blamed for his death. While preparing to leave for Ohio, Phillip insists that if Cornelia will not accompany him, he will find someone who will. Edwards informs Thackery the twins have been adopted by a family in Missouri. The twins depart the Knick, seen off by Bertie and Edwards. It is discovered Thackery's intestines are ischemic due to drug abuse, and surgery is suggested. Thackery insists on non surgical treatment, which is met with incredulity. Effie Barrow blackmails Barrow, having acquired evidence of his fraud and kickbacks for the new hospital. Desperate for cash, Barrow tries to slow progress of construction on the new Knick, with the architect and with Henry Robertson. Henry and Cornelia agree to confront their father at the new hospital that evening. Gallinger is cleared by the state medical board, agreeing that eugenics is a worthy field of study and that the vasectomies were legally performed. Harry proves to be a more adept salesperson of condoms than Cleary. Lucy pays a visit to her bedridden father and compares his life to that of a mule they owned, which failed to take instruction, until it was too old to be of use and was put down. She injects him with a lethal dose of drugs, while confessing her many sexual encounters. Cornelia confronts her father at the new hospital about his bribery and the murder of Speight. Captain Robertson denies her accusations but their conversation is ended when fire is discovered on the lower floors. The stairwell consumed with flames, Robertson helps Cornelia escape by holding a short ladder down an elevator shaft, insisting she jump the final few feet. She escapes, meeting her brother in front of the engulfed building. With no means of escape, Robertson is seen jumping from the upper floor of the new Knick to his death. In a final flashback in Nicaragua, Robertson is freed and departs with Thackery, during which Robertson suggests working at the Knick.
20	10	"This Is All We Are"	Steven Soderbergh	Jack Amiel & Michael Begler	December 18, 2015	0.275
Thackery collapses again but refuses his colleagues' offer of help. Now in full control of the Robertson company and fortune, Henry decides not to rebuild the new Knick. A police detective begins harassing Barrow, accusing him of setting the fire at the Knick. Lucy extracts a further commitment from Henry in exchange for accompanying him on a vacation. Barrow signs many of his assets over to Junia to prevent their being seized and uses his new social connections to force the detective to back down. After learning that Henry, not Captain Robertson, managed shipping operations for the family, Cornelia confronts Henry and accuses him of murdering Speight and setting the fire to kill her and their father; he admits his guilt and threatens her life to ensure her silence. Cleary proposes to Harriet. While taking confession, he admits to the priest that he informed on Harriet to the police so that the Church would expel her, allowing him a chance to pursue her romantically. The next day, Harriet accepts his proposal. Against his colleagues' objections, Thackery performs bowel surgery on himself, using a mirror and his own spinal block technique in lieu of anesthesia. The surgery proves complicated and he accidentally nicks his abdominal aorta, causing him to bleed out and lose consciousness. Bertie tries to revive the dying surgeon with adrenaline but it is not shown whether the treatment is successful. Cornelia boards a ship to Australia, hoping to flee her brother. Gallinger accepts an offer to travel the world promoting eugenics. Edwards decides to continue Thackery's work on addiction, since he can no longer practice as a surgeon due to his damaged eye. He begins by using Abigail's talk therapy on the last patient on Thackery's addiction ward.
