= Williams and Walker (The Knick) =

- The Knick episode
- Episode no.: Season 2 Episode 7
- Directed by: Steven Soderbergh
- Written by: Jack Amiel; Michael Begler
- Cinematography by: Peter Andrews (Note: Pseudonym for Steven Soderbergh.)
- Editing by: Mary Ann Bernard
- Original release date: November 27, 2015
- Running time: 57 minutes

Guest appearances
- Jennifer Ferrin as Abigail Alford; Arielle Goldman as Genevieve Everidge; Ntare Mwine as D.W. Garrison Carr; Molly Price as Effie Barrow; Andrew Rannells as Frazier H. Wingo; Gary Simpson as Hobart Showalter; Frank Wood as Mr. Havershorn; Perry Yung as Ping Wu; David Zimmerman as Inspector Bradley; Happy Anderson as Jimmy; Jane Beaird as Miriam Elaine Roork; Michael Berresse as Parke-Davis Representative; Rebekah Brockman as Nettie; Melanie Brook as Frances; Christina Clare as Receptionist; Chelsea Clark as Vera; Johanna Day as Eunice Showalter; Colman Domingo as Dr. Russell Daniels; Ylfa Edelstein as Nurse Baker; Miranda Gruss as Zoya; Rebecca Gruss as Nika; Barrington Hinds as Bert Williams; Kendell Hinds as George Walker; Emily Kinney as Nurse Daisy Ryan; Joe Lanza as Night Watchman; Jim Norton as Camera Man; Zachary Phillips as Wendell; Richard James Porter as Monsignor Joseph Mills Lawlor; Suzanne Savoy as Victoria Robertson; P.J. Sosko as Immigration Inspector; Zuzanna Szadkowski as Nurse Pell; Erin Wilhelmi as Lottie

Episode chronology
← Previous "There Are Rules"	Next → "Not Well at All"

"Williams and Walker" is the seventh episode of the second season of the American medical period drama television series The Knick. It is the 17th overall episode of the series and was written by series creators Jack Amiel and Michael Begler, and directed by executive producer Steven Soderbergh. It originally aired on Cinemax on November 27, 2015.

The series is set in New York City in the early twentieth century and follows the staff of the Knickerbocker Hospital (the Knick), who struggle against the limitations of medical understanding and practice. The protagonist is Dr. John Thackery, the new leader of the surgery staff, who balances his cocaine and opium addictions against his ambition for medical discovery and his reputation among his peers. In the episode, Thackery prepares to perform a surgery to separate conjoined twins, while the staff attends a ball.

According to Nielsen Media Research, the episode was seen by an estimated 0.347 million household viewers and gained a 0.09 ratings share among adults aged 18–49. The episode received extremely positive reviews from critics, who praised Soderbergh's directing and performances.

== Plot ==
Thackery (Clive Owen) informs the staff about his plan in separating conjoined twins, Zoya and Nika (Miranda and Rebecca Gruss). The surgery will last three hours, and he has asked Henry (Charles Aitken) to film the event with a motion picture camera.

Cornelia (Juliet Rylance) discovers that August (Grainger Hines) paid guards to allow diseased immigrants into the country, rather than spend the extra money to return them to their home country. Later, she is confronted by Hobart (Gary Simpson), who had men follow her in her investigation for Speight's death. He berates her for not being there for Phillip (Tom Lipinski), even going as far as to say that she should be pregnant by this point. This prompts Cornelia to tell Phillip that they are moving out, but Phillip dismisses her concerns.

The hospital staff attends a ball, with Thackery taking Abigail (Jennifer Ferrin) with him. The event includes a performance by Bert Williams and George Walker, a vaudeville comedy act featuring them in blackface. The crowd erupts in laughter at their jokes, but Opal (Zaraah Abrahams) is angered at the act. She later asks August over the position for Edwards (André Holland), questioning how there cannot be a place for Edwards at the Knick while the Robertsons allow a vaudeville comedy act mocking them.

Thackery visits a tombstone at the graveyard. He is questioned by one of the keepers, revealing that the tombstone belongs to a girl he failed to save during a surgery. He spent $65 on the tombstone, feeling she deserved to grow up and have a life. Later, he and Gallinger (Eric Johnson) watch Edwards perform a surgery. Unbeknownst to everyone, Gallinger applied more curare, causing the patient to almost die when Edwards injects him. Gallinger steps in and saves the patient, as he knows the procedure. This event shakes Edwards, as he feels humiliated by having the surgery saved by Gallinger.

== Production ==
=== Development ===
In October 2015, Cinemax announced that the seventh episode of the season would be titled "Williams and Walker", and that it would be written by series creators Jack Amiel and Michael Begler, and directed by executive producer Steven Soderbergh. This was Amiel's 14th writing credit, Begler's 14th writing credit, and Soderbergh's 17th directing credit.

== Reception ==
=== Viewers ===
In its original American broadcast, "Williams and Walker" was seen by an estimated 0.347 million household viewers with a 0.09 in the 18-49 demographics. This means that 0.09 percent of all households with televisions watched the episode. This was a massive 77% increase in viewership from the previous episode, which was watched by an estimated 0.195 million household viewers with a 0.06 in the 18-49 demographics.

=== Critical reviews ===
"Williams and Walker" received extremely positive reviews from critics. The review aggregator website Rotten Tomatoes reported a 100% approval rating for the episode, based on 9 reviews.

Brandon Nowalk of The A.V. Club gave the episode an "A" grade and wrote, "The 'Get the Rope' of season two, 'Williams And Walker' weaves every story and thematic throughline of the season together when a mob descends upon the Knick…charity ball. True to Mrs. Barrow's hopes, this is an event, although the ball is just a portion of the episode." Rodrigo Perez of IndieWire wrote, "Cut to 'Williams And Walker' and Thackery is having success with hypnosis as an experimental form of addiction treatment, guiding an alcoholic patient to be revolted by the sight and smell of alcohol. As 'There Are Rules' suggested — and much of season two thematically — progress isn't really moving fast enough for everyone."

Sarene Leeds of Entertainment Weekly wrote, "Gallinger's actions cause tonight's episode to end on an incredibly frustrating down note, as it's a painful reminder that this is 1901, and Edwards is facing a taxing uphill battle. It's a struggle that will probably last the rest of his life, with no signs of Opal's promised 'better days' ahead." Ivy Pochoda of Vulture gave the episode a perfect 5 star rating out of 5 and wrote, "Now, Edwards might be down, but I wouldn't discount him. He's got enough scientific chops to figure out what went wrong and why. But he just might have to conduct this investigation out of another hospital sooner than he'd thought."

Mike Hale of The New York Times wrote, "the real stars were Steven Soderbergh and his camera. Mr. Soderbergh opened the gala sequence with a continuous two-and-a-half-minute shot through a series of grand spaces that was showy but undeniably impressive." Steve MacFarlane of Slant Magazine wrote, "'Williams and Walker' is another display of spectacular ingenuity from The Knick director Steven Soderbergh and writers Jack Amiel and Michael Begler, wherein the show's customarily airtight cross-cutting between narratives begins to spell clear doom for the empire of hospital benefactor Captain August Robertson."

Alec Bojalad of Den of Geek gave the episode a 4 star rating out of 5 and wrote, "Everybody's just trying to help on The Knick. Well, not everyone as Gallinger has turned out to be a real racist, sabotaging, turd-burgler. But almost everyone else wants to help." Robert Ham of Paste gave the episode an 8.8 out of 10 and wrote, "If there are any demons haunting our beloved director, they certainly aren't as deep and as terrifying as what Thackery is dealing with, but they are there. And like any good creative, Soderbergh works as hard as he does to keep them at bay. We're just the lucky ones that get to watch him wrestle with them every week."
