= You're No Rose =

- The Knick episode
- Episode no.: Season 2 Episode 2
- Directed by: Steven Soderbergh
- Written by: Jack Amiel; Michael Begler
- Cinematography by: Peter Andrews (Note: Pseudonym for Steven Soderbergh.)
- Editing by: Mary Ann Bernard
- Original release date: October 23, 2015
- Running time: 56 minutes

Guest appearances
- Colman Domingo as Dr. Russell Daniels; Ben Livingston as Dr. William H. Mays; Jefferson Mays as Attorney Whitting; Lucas Papaelias as Eldon Pouncey; Molly Price as Effie Barrow; Alexandra Roxo as Cate; Suzanne Savoy as Victoria Robertson; Gary Simpson as Hobart Showalter; Stephen Spinella as A.D. Elkins; Frank Wood as Mr. Havershorn; Perry Yung as Ping Wu; Happy Anderson as Jimmy; Michael Berresse as Parke-Davis Representative; Johanna Day as Eunice Showalter; Christopher Dalbey as Bleier Driver; David Destefano as Wrestler; Ylfa Edelstein as Nurse Baker; John Treacy Egan as Detective Satterlee; Ying Ying Li as Lin-Lin; John O'Creagh as Tammany Hall Official; Richard James Porter as Monsignor Joseph Mills Lawlor; Briana Pozner as Gwynnie Showalter; Lucas Caleb Rooney as Mr. Karwoski; Zuzanna Szadkowski as Nurse Pell; Ginger Taylor as Sonya Smyslov; Yury Tsykun as Mr. Tibor; Mitchell Vallen as Otto

Episode chronology
← Previous "Ten Knots"	Next → "The Best with the Best to Get the Best"

"You're No Rose" is the second episode of the second season of the American medical period drama television series The Knick. It is the twelfth overall episode of the series and was written by series creators Jack Amiel and Michael Begler, and directed by executive producer Steven Soderbergh. It originally aired on Cinemax on October 23, 2015.

The series is set in New York City in the early twentieth century and follows the staff of the Knickerbocker Hospital (the Knick), who struggle against the limitations of medical understanding and practice. The protagonist is Dr. John Thackery, the new leader of the surgery staff, who balances his cocaine and opium addictions against his ambition for medical discovery and his reputation among his peers. In the episode, Thackery returns to the Knick, while Inspector Speight's corpse is found in the docks.

According to Nielsen Media Research, the episode was seen by an estimated 0.229 million household viewers and gained a 0.06 ratings share among adults aged 18–49. The episode received extremely positive reviews from critics, who praised Thackery's return to the hospital and performances.

== Plot ==
In the morning, two citizens discover the body of Inspector Speight in the water. Thackery (Clive Owen) returns to the Knick, convincing the board of directors in letting him investigate a cure for addiction, while renouncing his duty as Chief of Surgery. Elkins (Eve Hewson) is delighted to see him return, but gets heartbroken when Thackery asks to end their relationship, feeling his influence could ruin her life.

Upon discovering that Thackery returned, Chickering (Michael Angarano) decides to resign. He later gets a job working for Dr. Zinberg (Michael Nathanson) at Mt. Sinai, a Jewish hospital. Elkins is also visited by her father, A.D. (Stephen Spinella), a preacher. A.D. starts getting involved into the hospital's activities, also setting up a congregation in the city. Barrow (Jeremy Bobb) is also asked by Ping Wu (Perry Yung) in setting up a clinic for Wu's prostitutes at the Knick, to pay off his debt. A new doctor, Dr. William H. Mays (Ben Livingston), volunteers in helping run the clinic.

Speight's death is deemed as an accident from drunkenness, but Cornelia (Juliet Rylance) does not believe it, as he didn't drink alcohol. Suspecting of hiding the truth, she asks Cleary (Chris Sullivan) for help in exhuming his body. He agrees to help, on the condition that Cornelia gets a great lawyer for Sister Harriet (Cara Seymour). That night, they exhume the casket, only discovering that it is empty.

Edwards (André Holland) tells Thackery about his detached retina and asks for his help in leading a retinal reattachment. Despite Thackery's determination, the lingering withdrawal causes him to feel shaken, so Edwards pulls out before the surgery goes further. Unbeknownst to everyone, Thackery imagines a girl in the distance, whom he failed to save during a surgery.

== Production ==
=== Development ===
In September 2015, Cinemax announced that the second episode of the season would be titled "You're No Rose", and that it would be written by series creators Jack Amiel and Michael Begler, and directed by executive producer Steven Soderbergh. This was Amiel's tenth writing credit, Begler's tenth writing credit, and Soderbergh's twelfth directing credit.

== Reception ==
=== Viewers ===
In its original American broadcast, "You're No Rose" was seen by an estimated 0.229 million household viewers with a 0.06 in the 18-49 demographics. This means that 0.06 percent of all households with televisions watched the episode. This was a 15% decrease in viewership from the previous episode, which was watched by an estimated 0.269 million household viewers with a 0.07 in the 18-49 demographics.

=== Critical reviews ===
"You're No Rose" received extremely positive reviews from critics. The review aggregator website Rotten Tomatoes reported a 100% approval rating for the episode, based on 8 reviews.

Brandon Nowalk of The A.V. Club gave the episode an "A–" grade and wrote, "In a way 'Ten Knots' was easy. Almost all of the main characters were sequestered in separate storylines, give or take Gallinger's boat ride or Harry's visit from Cleary. Ten individual knots. Things are more complicated now that everyone but Harry is back at the Knick. There's a lot more collusion and collision in 'You're No Rose.'" Rodrigo Perez of IndieWire wrote, "As episode two, 'You're No Rose,' kicks into high gear with its typical form of picture, no dialogue, and few sounds outside of music, we discover a body."

Debbie Day of Entertainment Weekly wrote, "Only on a show like The Knick can a prayer meeting come off as scarier than a surgery involving injections to the eyeball." Ivy Pochoda of Vulture gave the episode a perfect 5 star rating out of 5 and wrote, "So, Thack's back, and not just at the Knick. For the one or two of you who might have worried the doctor would return to New York City clean as a whistle, fresh as a daisy, pure as the driven snow: Rest easy. The dope might be out of his system, replaced with a desire to find a cure for the disease of addiction (a radical notion at the time), but rehabilitated he is not."

Mike Hale of The New York Times wrote, "It would be nice to report that Thackery kept steady and the surgery was a success, but instead he had his recurring vision of the girl he killed on the operating table and shook so badly that Edwards stopped the operation." Steve MacFarlane of Slant Magazine wrote, "The throbbing, syncopated tick-tock of Cliff Martinez's electronic score is the sole intentional anachronism of The Knick, and it's against it that the show's latest episode opens." Alec Bojalad of Den of Geek a 4.5 star rating out of 5 and wrote, "The Knick is a lot like its protragonist: obsessively advancing forward like a meticulously-coifed shark. If you're out of rehab and able to work, you work, damn it. Thack's own obsessiveness blends so well with Soderbergh's snappy directing and Cliff Martinez's frantic score that it's easy to run along with them, trusting that you're getting something deeper but not particularly caring if you are. In that way, 'You're No Rose' isn't much different from the cocaine and heroin speedball concoction Thack discovers at episode's end."
