= Do You Remember Moon Flower? =

- The Knick episode
- Episode no.: Season 2 Episode 9
- Directed by: Steven Soderbergh
- Written by: Jack Amiel; Michael Begler
- Cinematography by: Peter Andrews (Note: Pseudonym for Steven Soderbergh.)
- Editing by: Mary Ann Bernard
- Original release date: December 11, 2015
- Running time: 53 minutes

Guest appearances
- Tom Brangle as Frank Moorhouse; David Pittu as Dr. Phelps; Molly Price as Effie Barrow; Stephen Spinella as A.D. Elkins; Happy Anderson as Jimmy; Annabelle Attanasio as Dorothy Walcott; Ken Barnett as Raphael Warren; David Bluvband as Accountant; Alfredo De Quesada as Madriz; Ylfa Edelstein as Nurse Baker; Miranda Gruss as Zoya; Rebecca Gruss as Nika; Juan Carlos Infante as Nicaraguan Soldier #1; Brian Kerwin as Corky Vanderbilt; Thomas Kopache as Samuel Reid; Robert Robalino as Nicaraguan Guide; Alexandra Roxo as Cate; Reza Salazar as Nicaraguan Soldier #2

Episode chronology
← Previous "Not Well at All"	Next → "This Is All We Are"

"Do You Remember Moon Flower?" is the ninth episode of the second season of the American medical period drama television series The Knick. It is the 19th overall episode of the series and was written by series creators Jack Amiel and Michael Begler, and directed by executive producer Steven Soderbergh. It originally aired on Cinemax on December 11, 2015.

The series is set in New York City in the early twentieth century and follows the staff of the Knickerbocker Hospital (the Knick), who struggle against the limitations of medical understanding and practice. The protagonist is Dr. John Thackery, the new leader of the surgery staff, who balances his cocaine and opium addictions against his ambition for medical discovery and his reputation among his peers. In the episode, Thackery's condition worsens, while Cornelia questions her father's involvement in Speight's death.

According to Nielsen Media Research, the episode was seen by an estimated 0.199 million household viewers and gained a 0.04 ratings share among adults aged 18–49. The episode received extremely positive reviews from critics, with praise for the performances, character development and writing.

== Plot ==
=== Flashback ===
Thackery (Clive Owen) is in Nicaragua, where he discovers a smallpox epidemic brought by an American. Thackery then meets the American, August Robertson (Grainger Hines), held prisoner. He manages to make a deal in which he will treat the patients, if August is released. As gratitude, August offers him a position to work at the Knick.

=== 1901 ===
At the Knick, the surgery to separate Zoya and Nika (Miranda ane Rebecca Gruss) proved to be a success, and the twins are able to take their first steps. Edwards (André Holland) informs Thackery the twins have been adopted by a family in Missouri, and they leave soon after, although Thackery is unable to bid them farewell.

Gallinger (Eric Johnson) is angry when Edwards reports his underground activities to the state medical board. Nevertheless, Gallinger's statement convinces the board to clear him of the charges, deeming that eugenics is a worthy field of study and that the vasectomies were legally performed. He then brutally beats Edwards outside and has sex with Dorothy (Annabelle Attanasio) at home. Phillip (Tom Lipinski) tells Cornelia (Juliet Rylance) that he is leaving for Ohio to check on the family refinery and he wants her to go with him. When she declines, he berates her for never satisfying him and warns that he will divorce her if she does not come.

Thackery collapses outside the Knick and allows Edwards and Chickering (Michael Angarano) to take him to Mt. Sinai, where Zinberg (Michael Nathanson) checks on him. It is discovered that Thackery's intestines are ischemic due to his cocaine addiction, and a surgery is required. Thackery insists on non surgical treatment, which is met with incredulity. Effie (Molly Price) visits Barrow (Jeremy Bobb) at his office, revealing that she discovered documents exposing his embezzlement activities. She blackmails him on giving him half of his money for the following years, which he reluctantly accepts. Elkins (Eve Hewson) visits the bedridden A.D. (Stephen Spinella), revealing all the sexual acts she committed before injecting him with a lethal drug.

Cornelia meets with August at the new hospital, where she confronts him over his bribery and the murder of Speight. An upset August claims that he never did any of those things. Suddenly, a fire breaks out in the lower floors of the building. August manages to get Cornelia out of the building, where she meets with Henry (Charles Aitken). Without any way of escaping, August decides to drop off the building, presumably to his death.

== Production ==
=== Development ===
In November 2015, Cinemax announced that the ninth episode of the season would be titled "Do You Remember Moon Flower?", and that it would be written by series creators Jack Amiel and Michael Begler, and directed by executive producer Steven Soderbergh. This was Amiel's 15th writing credit, Begler's 15th writing credit, and Soderbergh's 19th directing credit.

== Reception ==
=== Viewers ===
In its original American broadcast, "Not Well at All" was seen by an estimated 0.199 million household viewers with a 0.04 in the 18-49 demographics. This means that 0.04 percent of all households with televisions watched the episode. This was a 26% decrease in viewership from the previous episode, which was watched by an estimated 0.266 million household viewers with a 0.05 in the 18-49 demographics.

=== Critical reviews ===
"Do You Remember Moon Flower?" received extremely positive reviews from critics. The review aggregator website Rotten Tomatoes reported an 100% approval rating for the episode, based on 9 reviews.

Brandon Nowalk of The A.V. Club gave the episode an "A–" grade and wrote, "The three themes of sex, parenting, and power combine in the chilling title scene." Kevin Jagernauth of IndieWire wrote, "Secrets play a big role in the penultimate episode of The Knick season two. They are at the core of the turning points for many key characters as we head into the finale, and never has the future looked so bleak for many of them. And yet, life is cruel in its way, because one of the most odious characters seems to have found his groove."

Sarene Leeds of Entertainment Weekly wrote, "there is no doubt of Thack's deep depression in the aftermath of Abby's death. He's too involved in his own sorrow to even bid farewell to Zoya and Nika, who take their first steps as separated sisters tonight — and are then adopted by a Missouri family. But with Abby and the formerly conjoined twins out of the way, 'Do You Remember Moon Flower?' was able to turn its focus onto Thack's own health." Ivy Pochoda of Vulture gave the episode a 4 star rating out of 5 and wrote, "There's a chance — a very teeny, tiny one — that Mr. Robertson is guilty of all Cornelia uncovered. And there's a chance that he saved his daughter because he only hurts those whom he can’t see. But I fear that now the real blame falls on the shoulders of dashing Henry, who has been looking to bolster the Robertsons' fortunes since he turned up on the scene, for whom boring old shipping has never been enough, who lost all that money in the subway explosion, who seems to have spent freely on cars and fancy motion-picture cameras. I guess the signs have been there all along. I guess, like Nurse Elkins, I, too, was easily charmed."

Mike Hale of The New York Times wrote, "The Knick took a 2,000-mile detour at the beginning of this week's episode, opening — disconcertingly — not on 1900s New York but on a somnolent jungle landscape that was soon identified as 1894 Nicaragua. There John Thackery, hired to stop a smallpox outbreak, first met the shipping magnate Capt. August Robertson, handcuffed to a post and accused of causing the outbreak. Thackery contained the smallpox and bargained for Robertson's release, and in a bookending Nicaragua scene at the end of the episode, we saw that this was the origin story of The Knick." Steve MacFarlane of Slant Magazine wrote, "There's a very good chance the fire was started deliberately, but it's unclear the show's makers could keep that a mystery in the one remaining episode without explicitly withholding crucial details — in effect, betraying the omniscience of the show’s adopted aesthetic. Which points back to a question that's haunted The Knick for its entirety: Just how soap-operatic are Soderbergh and writers Jack Amiel and Michael Begler willing to go?"

Alec Bojalad of Den of Geek gave the episode a 4 star rating out of 5 and wrote, "'Do You Remember Moon Flower?' understands the conflict at the center of The Knick. The oath says 'do no harm' but the human condition says 'try not to do any harm but you'll probably fuck that up along the way.'" Robert Ham of Paste gave the episode a 9.6 out of 10 and wrote, "For those few brief minutes, we were reminded of how good he could be both as a doctor and as a human being. He went out of his way to cobble together a treatment for the smallpox patients and to inoculate those villagers who haven't been infected. And he did it, in part, to help free Captain Robertson from his shackles. Faint glimmers of hope surrounding an otherwise harrowing hour of television."
