= There Are Rules (The Knick) =

- The Knick episode
- Episode no.: Season 2 Episode 6
- Directed by: Steven Soderbergh
- Written by: Jack Amiel; Michael Begler
- Cinematography by: Peter Andrews (Note: Pseudonym for Steven Soderbergh.)
- Editing by: Mary Ann Bernard
- Original release date: November 20, 2015
- Running time: 57 minutes

Guest appearances
- Jarlath Conroy as Hypnotist; Colman Domingo as Dr. Russell Daniels; Chris Elliott as Port Authority Officer; Linda Emond as Anne Chickering; Jennifer Ferrin as Abigail Alford; Arielle Goldman as Genevieve Everidge; John Hodgman as Dr. Henry Cotton; Ntare Mwine as D.W. Garrison Carr; Reg Rogers as Dr. Bertram Chickering, Sr.; Fred Weller as Mr. Brockhurst; Annabelle Attanasio as Dorothy Walcott; Rebekah Brockman as Nettie; Melanie Brook as Frances; Jay Carrado as Man in Zoya and Nika's Room; Chelsea Clark as Vera; Roberto De Felice as Gino Petrizzi; Rocco Di Gregorio as Tenement Man; Rachel E. Farrar as Receptionist; Andy Grotelueschen as Hypnotized Man; Miranda Gruss as Zoya; Rebecca Gruss as Nika; Aedin Moloney as Sister Mary Michael; Lucas Papaelias as Eldon Pouncey; Jonathan Randall Silver as Mt. Sinai Orderly; Zuzanna Szadkowski as Nurse Pell; Ginger Taylor as Sonya Smyslov

Episode chronology
← Previous "Whiplash"	Next → "Williams and Walker"

"There Are Rules" is the sixth episode of the second season of the American medical period drama television series The Knick. It is the 16th overall episode of the series and was written by series creators Jack Amiel and Michael Begler, and directed by executive producer Steven Soderbergh. It originally aired on Cinemax on November 20, 2015.

The series is set in New York City in the early twentieth century and follows the staff of the Knickerbocker Hospital (the Knick), who struggle against the limitations of medical understanding and practice. The protagonist is Dr. John Thackery, the new leader of the surgery staff, who balances his cocaine and opium addictions against his ambition for medical discovery and his reputation among his peers. In the episode, Thackery becomes fascinated when he discovers a pair of twins at a sideshow, while Chickering makes a last effort in saving his mother.

According to Nielsen Media Research, the episode was seen by an estimated 0.195 million household viewers and gained a 0.05 ratings share among adults aged 18–49. The episode received extremely positive reviews from critics, who praised Soderbergh's directing, performances and character development.

== Plot ==
Thackery (Clive Owen) attends an act of hypnosis at a sideshow. He becomes fascinated by the act, and wonders if this could be used in his research to cure addiction. He also discovers a pair of conjoined twins, Zoya and Nika (Miranda and Rebecca Gruss), playing a violin, and the owner, Mr. Brockhurst (Fred Weller), allows Thackery to check them at the Knick.

At Mt. Sinai, Chickering (Michael Angarano) decides to go forward with an underground operation on Anne (Linda Emond), with Edwards (André Holland) agreeing to help him and Bertram Sr. (Reg Rogers) watching. Dr. Zinberg (Michael Nathanson) finds them and while he is angry, he decides to help them in the surgery. Nevertheless, the tumor is revealed to have grown more and Anne dies in surgery. Dr. Zinberg chastises Chickering for his actions, prompting Chickering to resign from his job. While devastated, his father consoles him for his efforts in saving her.

Gallinger (Eric Johnson) returns home, but is angered when he finds that Eleanor (Maya Kazan) has invited Dr. Henry Cotton (John Hodgman) to dine with them. The dinner proves to be an awkward experience, as Gallinger does not hide his disdain for Cotton's controversial methods. Eleanor defends Cotton, certain that he cured her. Cotton is forced to leave when he experiences a stomach ache.

Thackery interviews Zoya and Nika, who reveal their disturbing background in the sideshow, where they are constantly abused. When Brockhurst comes back to retrieve them, he angrily dismisses Thackery's claim that the twins can be separated. That night, Thackery and Cleary (Chris Sullivan) sneak into Brockhurst's house, where Cleary brutally beats Brockhurst and Thackery retrieves the Zoya and Nika. Later, Thackery shares with Abigail (Jennifer Ferrin) a planned surgery in separating the twins, but Abigail expresses her disdain over him controlling the nature of the twins. Thackery then kisses her, proclaiming that he still loves her despite many obstacles.

== Production ==
=== Development ===
In October 2015, Cinemax announced that the sixth episode of the season would be titled "There Are Rules", and that it would be written by series creators Jack Amiel and Michael Begler, and directed by executive producer Steven Soderbergh. This was Amiel's 13th writing credit, Begler's 13th writing credit, and Soderbergh's 16th directing credit.

== Reception ==
=== Viewers ===
In its original American broadcast, "There Are Rules" was seen by an estimated 0.195 million household viewers with a 0.05 in the 18-49 demographics. This means that 0.05 percent of all households with televisions watched the episode. This was a 24% decrease in viewership from the previous episode, which was watched by an estimated 0.255 million household viewers with a 0.06 in the 18-49 demographics.

=== Critical reviews ===
"There Are Rules" received extremely positive reviews from critics. The review aggregator website Rotten Tomatoes reported a 100% approval rating for the episode, based on 9 reviews.

Brandon Nowalk of The A.V. Club gave the episode a "B+" grade and wrote, "Last week Edwards sat in an audience just like this in order to play a generic statue, but 'There Are Rules' gets specific and weird in both content and form. The episode is full of horror cues, not to frighten us but to excite us, to alert us that something might be up."

Sarene Leeds of Entertainment Weekly wrote, "Leave it to a show like The Knick to name an episode centered on a major character's disregard for medical protocol — which results in both his mother's death and the loss of his job — 'There Are Rules.'" Ivy Pochoda of Vulture gave the episode a 4 star rating out of 5 and wrote, "This week, we get a slight break from the madness — a respite from the horror of eugenics, the torment of addiction, and the torture of romance. And like any good vacation with a little amusement, a quick trip to Huber's Dime Museum over on 14th Street to check out the freaks, geeks, charlatans, and other curios of the Victorian age."

Mike Hale of The New York Times wrote, "Having begun as a dark carnival of mystery and malpractice, the hour concluded in a rush of romance." Steve MacFarlane of Slant Magazine wrote, "Even if the at-times unbelievable density of The Knick's second season has felt thus far like no accident, it's a welcome change to see Steven Soderbergh digging his directorial heels deeper into fewer subplots in this week's 'There Are Rules.'"

Alec Bojalad of Den of Geek gave the episode a 3 star rating out of 5 and wrote, "'There Are Rules' is a good and watchable episode of television but there are aspects of it that simply don't belong in a show as visually impressive as The Knick. Most of it has to do with how the show's scripts are treating its secondary characters. We're past the half point of the season and it's clear that the show doesn't know what to do with certain characters." Robert Ham of Paste gave the episode a 9.5 out of 10 and wrote, "This season of The Knick could not have come along at a better time. In a year when we are faced with a field of Republican candidates and other right wing politicians who are so absolutely assured that their blinkered and dangerous way is the right way, these episodes remind us how little has changed in over 100 years."
