= This Is All We Are =

- The Knick episode
- Episode no.: Season 2 Episode 10
- Directed by: Steven Soderbergh
- Written by: Jack Amiel; Michael Begler
- Cinematography by: Peter Andrews (Note: Pseudonym for Steven Soderbergh.)
- Editing by: Mary Ann Bernard
- Original release date: December 18, 2015
- Running time: 56 minutes

Guest appearances
- Jennifer Ferrin as Abigail Alford; Arielle Goldman as Genevieve Everidge; Joe Hansard as Detective Tuggle; Brian Kerwin as Corky Vanderbilt; David Pittu as Dr. Phelps; Frank Wood as Mr. Havershorn; Happy Anderson as Jimmy; Johanna Day as Eunice Showalter; Ylfa Edelstein as Nurse Baker; Andrew Haserlat as Ticket Agent; Ying Ying Li as Lin-Lin; Ciarán O'Reilly as Priest (voice); Richard James Porter as Monsignor Joseph Mills Lawlor; Eugene Poznyak as Mr. Dominczyk; Suzanne Savoy as Victoria Robertson; Gary Simpson as Hobart Showalter; Zuzanna Szadkowski as Nurse Pell; Ginger Taylor as Sonya Smyslov; Yaegel Welch as Henry's Valet

Episode chronology
← Previous "Do You Remember Moon Flower?"	Next → —

"This Is All We Are" is the tenth episode of the second season and series finale of the American medical period drama television series The Knick. It is the 20th overall episode of the series and was written by series creators Jack Amiel and Michael Begler, and directed by executive producer Steven Soderbergh. It originally aired on Cinemax on December 18, 2015. In March 2017, Cinemax cancelled the series, making the episode the series finale.

The series is set in New York City in the early twentieth century and follows the staff of the Knickerbocker Hospital (the Knick), who struggle against the limitations of medical understanding and practice. The protagonist is Dr. John Thackery, the new leader of the surgery staff, who balances his cocaine, opium, and heroin addictions against his ambition for medical discovery and his reputation among his peers. In the episode, Thackery decides to perform a risky surgery on himself, while Cornelia discovers the person responsible for Speight's death and the fire.

According to Nielsen Media Research, the episode was seen by an estimated 0.275 million household viewers and gained a 0.05 ratings share among adults aged 18–49. The episode received critical acclaim, with praise towards the performances, directing and closure. Some expressed that the episode worked as a series finale. At the 68th Primetime Emmy Awards, Steven Soderbergh received a nomination for Outstanding Directing for a Drama Series.

== Plot ==
Thackery (Clive Owen) continues experiencing severe stomach ache, causing more collapses. While Zinberg (Michael Nathanson) suggests many treatments, Thackery rejects them, wanting the surgery to be done in his terms. After the fire, Henry (Charles Aitken) decides not to build the new hospital, while Barrow (Jeremy Bobb) is suspected of starting the fire.

Cornelia (Juliet Rylance) decides to accompany Phillip (Tom Lipinski) in his trip to Ohio. However, she meets with Henry beforehand and is shocked to discover that he is responsible for shipping operations for the family. She then accuses him of killing Speight and burning the new hospital, which he does not deny. He then threatens her that he covered his tracks and that her word is not enough to convict him of the crimes. Scared for her life, she decides to flee to Australia.

Cleary (Chris Sullivan) proposes to Harriet (Cara Seymour). While taking confession, he admits to the priest that he informed on Harriet to the police so that the Church would expel her, allowing him a chance to pursue her romantically. The next day, Harriet accepts his proposal. Meanwhile, Gallinger (Eric Johnson) is offered to travel the world promoting eugenics, which he decides to accept.

Without any support, Thackery decides to perform the bowel surgery on himself, using a mirror and his own spinal block technique in lieu of anesthesia. While carefully operating, he accidentally nicks his abdominal aorta and loses consciousness after bleeding out. Gallinger, Chickering (Michael Angarano) and Edwards (André Holland) then are forced to try in reviving him, but his condition worsens. Desperate, Chickering leaves to retrieve adrenaline and injects Thackery. His fate is not revealed.

Edwards finds Abigail's notes on Thackery's desk. As he is unable to perform surgery due to his eye, he asks Henry to be allowed in continuing Thackery's investigation into drug addiction, which Henry grants him. He visits the last patient on Thackery's addiction ward, intending to help him overcome his addiction.

== Production ==
=== Development ===
In November 2015, Cinemax announced that the tenth episode of the season would be titled "This Is All We Are", and that it would be written by series creators Jack Amiel and Michael Begler, and directed by executive producer Steven Soderbergh. This was Amiel's 16th writing credit, Begler's 16th writing credit, and Soderbergh's 20th directing credit.

== Reception ==
=== Viewers ===
In its original American broadcast, "This Is All We Are" was seen by an estimated 0.275 million household viewers with a 0.05 in the 18-49 demographics. This means that 0.05 percent of all households with televisions watched the episode. This was a 38% increase in viewership from the previous episode, which was watched by an estimated 0.199 million household viewers with a 0.04 in the 18-49 demographics.

=== Critical reviews ===
"This Is All We Are" received critical acclaim. The review aggregator website Rotten Tomatoes reported a 90% approval rating for the episode, based on 10 reviews. The site's consensus states: "'This is All We Are' competently ties up loose ends while maintaining enough dramatic momentum to draw viewers back in for a potential third season of The Knick."

Matt Fowler of IGN gave the episode a "great" 8.8 out of 10 and wrote in his verdict, "'This Is All We Are' most certainly raised the bar on the Thackery-insanity front. Again, noble pursuits are behind his crumblings and failings. This time, an effort to honor Abigail and make sure no one use ether anymore. But Thack will always find some charitable, beneficial cause and then use it as an excuse to spiral out of control. A great episode that answered a mystery (or two) while setting up the pieces for next season. Of course, this episode could also stand as a series finale if need be. We didn't exactly find out if the adrenaline worked to save Thackery and if it was his grand hurrah, then what a way to go out. And yes, everyone else's story could be an end point too if it came to that. The Robertson family drama, Elkins' issues with her dad, Edwards' impossible battle, Bertie's search for love - it could all end here if Soderbergh sees fit."

Brandon Nowalk of The A.V. Club gave the episode an "A" grade and wrote, "It's not right to say the horror story is over in the season two finale of The Knick, only that it's relinquished its grip on us. 'This Is All We Are' is a dark episode, especially for a finale, and very especially if this turns out to be the series finale now that the show has dropped in the ratings, lost the shock of the new, and says goodbye to its movie star lead. 'This is all we are' is almost a mission statement for The Knick, or so it has seemed."

Alan Sepinwall of HitFix wrote, "Directing (and shooting and editing) every episode each season must be tiring, even given how quickly Soderbergh works. Maybe he needs a break, or maybe this really was viewed as a two-season experiment all along, with Soderbergh trying out a different TV project next, or just taking time off and coming back in a couple of years with a Knick reboot set a few decades into the hospital's future, with different characters and different kinds of disgusting primitive surgery. All I know is that I'll be watching it if he's directing it." Kevin Jagernauth of IndieWire wrote, "Whatever glimmers of hope, or shafts of light illuminating suggested innocence there might have been across the season, it's revealed that beneath everybody lies pain and darkness. The Knick goes out with a bold finish, one that can only see a radical change, if we are to see a third season."

Sarene Leeds of Entertainment Weekly wrote, "When you stop and think about it, that had all the makings of a great series finale. Now, that doesn't mean The Knick has indeed come to its conclusion — the future of the show remains up in the air as it has yet to be renewed; Cinemax is currently keeping mum on that front — but if it has, 'This Is All We Are' settles the fates of the characters who populate the Knickerbocker Hospital quite nicely." Ivy Pochoda of Vulture gave the episode a 4 star rating out of 5 and wrote, "It was relentless and at times unforgiving. It was a season of death, betrayal, and excavation of the basest sides of humanity. There was more failure than success, more devastation than joy. Some of our dashing, delightful friends turned out to be monsters. And some of those monsters seem to have gotten away with their crimes. Many who were trying to pull themselves out of despair failed miserably. For the handful who were afforded happiness, it came with a price. And now that all is said and done, we are worse off than when we began. But did I enjoy it? Strangely, yes. But now I'm worried."

Mike Hale of The New York Times wrote, "If those were the final words of The Knick, it was a nice way to go. If they weren't, maybe Edwards can try to get Thackery off the cocaine and heroin in Season 3. Here's hoping." Steve MacFarlane of Slant Magazine wrote, "Within the halls of medical reason, his apparent death would appear a kind of seppuku, as if admonishing his audience for their faith in science while exposing an inventory of what his addictions — indeed, his much-lauded brilliance — have left him with."

Alec Bojalad of Den of Geek gave the episode a 4 star rating out of 5 and wrote, "Season two has plenty of issues and 'This Is All We Are' plays like a greatest hits for all of them. Thankfully, the conclusion of Dr. Thackery's storyline and life nearly redeems them all." Robert Ham of Paste gave the episode a 9.4 out of 10 and wrote, "Do we even want or need a third season of The Knick? That's the question I couldn't rub from my mind after watching this hour, which wrapped up the second run of episodes of this otherwise fantastic drama."

=== Accolades ===
For the episode, Steven Soderbergh received a nomination for Outstanding Directing for a Drama Series at the 68th Primetime Emmy Awards. He would lose the award to Game of Thrones for the episode, "Battle of the Bastards".
