= Working Late a Lot =

- The Knick episode
- Episode no.: Season 1 Episode 8
- Directed by: Steven Soderbergh
- Written by: Jack Amiel; Michael Begler
- Cinematography by: Peter Andrews (Note: Pseudonym for Steven Soderbergh.)
- Editing by: Mary Ann Bernard
- Original release date: October 3, 2014
- Running time: 52 minutes

Guest appearances
- Michael Berresse as Parke-Davis Representative; William Hill as Archbishop; Melissa McMeekin as Mary Mallon; Michael Nathanson as Dr. Levi Zinberg; Reg Rogers as Dr. Bertram Chickering, Sr.; Robert Vincent Smith as Judge; Frank Wood as Mr. Havershorn; Ken Marks as Mr. Bakerman; Annie McNamara as Woman; Michael Milligan as President; Richard James Porter as Monsignor Joseph Mills Lawlor; Ying Ying Li as Lin-Lin; Rusty Hendrickson as Carriage Driver; Antwayn Hopper as Woodson; Leopold Manswell as Hiram; Geoff Schuppert as Bailiff; Ben Van Bergen as Mr. Tuttle; Perry Yung as Ping Wu

Episode chronology
← Previous "Get the Rope"	Next → "The Golden Lotus"

"Working Late a Lot" is the eighth episode of the American medical period drama television series The Knick. The episode was written by series creators Jack Amiel and Michael Begler, and directed by executive producer Steven Soderbergh. It originally aired on Cinemax on October 3, 2014.

The series is set in New York City in the early twentieth century and follows the staff of the Knickerbocker Hospital (the Knick), who struggle against the limitations of medical understanding and practice. The protagonist is Dr. John Thackery, the new leader of the surgery staff, who balances his cocaine and opium addictions against his ambition for medical discovery and his reputation among his peers. In the episode, Thackery suffers cocaine withdrawal due to a shortage of cocaine in the hospital.

According to Nielsen Media Research, the episode was seen by an estimated 0.349 million household viewers and gained a 0.09 ratings share among adults aged 18–49. The episode received extremely positive reviews from critics, who praised the performances (particularly Clive Owen), directing and themes.

== Plot ==
Thackery (Clive Owen) and Elkins (Eve Hewson) continue their affair, while also using cocaine during their encounters. However, Thackery panics when Barrow (Jeremy Bobb) reveals that the riot at the hospital caused their supply of cocaine to run out, on top of other damaged properties in the building.

Thackery presents the paper that he co-authored with Edwards (André Holland) on the new hernia method, which is met with applause by his superiors. However, he feels overshadowed by the arrival of his rival, Dr. Levi Zinberg (Michael Nathanson), who presents an illuminating intrascope. Thackery is also approached by Bertram Chickering Sr. (Reg Rogers), who wants him to dismiss Chickering (Michael Angarano) from his staff, but Thackery angrily refuses. To complicate matters, Thackery's cocaine withdrawal starts affecting him, especially becoming colder to Elkins.

Sister Harriet (Cara Seymour) gets a baby girl, Grace, for Gallinger (Eric Johnson). However, Eleanor (Maya Kazan) is unwilling to accept a new baby, feeling that she may cause the death of her as well. Despite Gallinger's insistence, Eleanor ignores Grace through the whole stay. Meanwhile, Barrow also makes visits to many organizations to find funds. When no one accepts his requests, he decides to fire two employees from the furnace room in order to have enough money to get more cocaine.

Edwards and Cornelia (Juliet Rylance) continue their affair, while they are also involved in a case against Mary Mallon (Melissa McMeekin) for spreading typhoid among the socialites. They attend a court hearing, but the case is ruled in Mary's favor when Chickering insults the judge. She is released from the authorities and mocks Cornelia, Edwards and Speight (David Fierro) on her way out of the courthouse. Later, Mary goes to look for a job, denying being known as "Typhoid Mary" in the newspapers.

With no cocaine, Thackery decides to ingest strychnine before a surgery. However, the drug affects his ability to perform the surgery, so he hands it over to Edwards. Later, at the opium den, Thackery hallucinates about encountering Christiansen's body right after his suicide.

== Production ==
=== Development ===
In September 2014, Cinemax announced that the eighth episode of the season would be titled "Working Late a Lot", and that it would be written by series creators Jack Amiel and Michael Begler, and directed by executive producer Steven Soderbergh. This was Amiel's seventh writing credit, Begler's seventh writing credit, and Soderbergh's eighth directing credit.

== Reception ==
=== Viewers ===
In its original American broadcast, "Working Late a Lot" was seen by an estimated 0.349 million household viewers with a 0.09 in the 18-49 demographics. This means that 0.09 percent of all households with televisions watched the episode. This was a slight decrease in viewership from the previous episode, which was watched by an estimated 0.358 million household viewers with a 0.12 in the 18-49 demographics.

=== Critical reviews ===
"Working Late a Lot" received extremely positive reviews from critics. The review aggregator website Rotten Tomatoes reported an 91% approval rating for the episode, based on 11 reviews. The site's consensus states: "Despite a drastic tonal shift from last week's volatile events, 'Working Late a Lot' further reinforces The Knick's equally skillful aptitude for quieter character moments and small-scale drama."

Matt Fowler of IGN gave the episode a "great" 8.6 out of 10 and wrote in his verdict, "Eight episodes into The Knick and most of the characters are now intertwined with one another in meaningful ways. Thackery may have landed the girl but his drug abuse is starting to have very real consequences. And that which he uses to innovate is now biting at his heels and effecting the way people view him. Gallinger didn't even make a peep about Edwards stepping in to finish the facial surgery because Thackery leaving the theater was such a big deal. It will be interesting to see if Thackery's problems escalate from here or if the opium fix at the end was enough to regulate him back to brilliance."

Brandon Nowalk of The A.V. Club gave the episode a "B" grade and wrote, "When Typhoid Mary swears in at her trial, Speight advises the judge to throw that Bible out. Not only does it have her shit on it, but it carries typhoid bacteria as well. That's the general vibe of “Working Late A Lot.” The people in charge are failing us."

Debbie Day of Entertainment Weekly wrote, "The Knick indulges in some vices in its latest, which should maybe be called Working It a Lot, because there's a whole lot of bad behavior, sexytime, and sass this week in the period drama." Keith Uhlich of Vulture gave the episode a perfect 5 star rating out of 5 and wrote, "'Get the Rope' was the euphoric high. 'Working Late a Lot' is the lull before the fall — like being perched on the edge of an abyss into which you know you're about to plunge. It's the awareness of the predicament that gnaws at you the most."

Mike Hale of The New York Times wrote, "For two-thirds of a season on The Knick we've been waiting for Dr. John Thackery's cocaine addiction to bring him down — not for any moralistic reasons, but just because it seemed like it was destiny. The moment arrived, more or less, on Friday night in the episode 'Working Late a Lot.'" Steve MacFarlane of Slant Magazine wrote, "The change in seasons is a terrifically smart maneuver, even if it allows for some fairly obvious hopscotching. 'Get the Rope' had some of The Knick's widest and most heavily color-graded frames to date."

Gerri Mahn of Den of Geek a perfect 5 star rating out of 5 and wrote, "I love the slow burn Soderbergh has us roasting at. Thack no longer seems like the devil he was in the series premier. His rough edges have been sanded down, ever so slightly. He isn't just a raging narcissist. He cares; about his staff, his lover, and possibly even his patients. Most of all, he cares that the Knick has run out of cocaine." Robert Ham of Paste gave the episode an 8.8 out of 10 and wrote, "Of course, that's the beauty of setting a show like this in the past; we can look at it through our modern eyes and marvel at how far we've come. It also leaves us scrambling to wonder what sort of ills — societal or mental or physical — will befall the characters on the show. The possibilities are varied, and none of them feel particularly good."
