= Where's the Dignity? =

- The Knick episode
- Episode no.: Season 1 Episode 4
- Directed by: Steven Soderbergh
- Written by: Jack Amiel; Michael Begler
- Cinematography by: Peter Andrews (Note: Pseudonym for Steven Soderbergh.)
- Editing by: Mary Ann Bernard
- Original release date: September 5, 2014
- Running time: 56 minutes

Guest appearances
- Emily Bergl as Mrs. Hemming; La Tonya Borsay as Evaline Edwards; Jennifer Ferrin as Abigail Alford; Tom Lipinski as Phillip Showalter; Reg Rogers as Dr. Bertram Chickering; Gary Simpson as Hobart Showalter; Melissa Errico as Catherine Christiansen; Lucas Papaelias as Eldon Pouncey; Suzanne Savoy as Victoria Robertson; Lily Brahms as Clara Chickering; Phillip JM Chorba as Quinn; Johanna Day as Eunice Showalter; Ylfa Edelstein as Nurse Baker; Robert Michael Hugel as Mr. Gatchell; Ying Ying Li as Lin-Lin; Pei Pei Lin as Delores; Jason Martin as Man; Katarina Morhacova as Young Woman; Samuel Muriithi as Uniformed Servant; Rebecka Ray as Patient; Zuzanna Szadkowski as Nurse Pell; Clarke Thorell as McTeague; David Tichy as Rat Catcher; Tom Treadwell as Mr. Edison; Craig Waletzko as Salesman; Jon Patrick Walker as Doctor; Maja Wampuszyc as Mrs. Zygmund

Episode chronology
← Previous "The Busy Flea"	Next → "They Capture the Heat"

"Where's the Dignity?" is the fourth episode of the American medical period drama television series The Knick. The episode was written by series creators Jack Amiel and Michael Begler, and directed by executive producer Steven Soderbergh. It originally aired on Cinemax on September 5, 2014.

The series is set in New York City in the early twentieth century and follows the staff of the Knickerbocker Hospital (the Knick), who struggle against the limitations of medical understanding and practice. The protagonist is Dr. John Thackery, the new leader of the surgery staff, who balances his cocaine and opium addictions against his ambition for medical discovery and his reputation among his peers. In the episode, Edwards continues making his way through the hospital, while Cleary is shaken after a recent tragedy.

According to Nielsen Media Research, the episode was seen by an estimated 0.374 million household viewers and gained a 0.13 ratings share among adults aged 18–49. The episode received positive reviews from critics, who praised Soderbergh's directing, score and performances.

== Plot ==
During a surgery, Gallinger (Eric Johnson) is talked by Edwards (André Holland) through the process. He takes a scalpel, which saves the patient's life, although Gallinger feels insulted by the procedure. Edwards later attends an engagement party for Cornelia (Juliet Rylance) and her fiancé, Phillip (Tom Lipinski). Cornelia is not delighted about potentially moving to San Francisco and leaving her life in New York behind.

Convinced by Elkins (Eve Hewson), Thackery (Clive Owen) decides to visit Abigail (Jennifer Ferrin) to check on her. He tells Abigail that he understands why she left him, but he is not as convinced over the man she left him for. He then leaves for an opium den, unaware that Elkins is following him. Later, Thackery performs a surgery on a woman who performed a self-administed abortion. Despite his best efforts, the woman dies.

Barrow (Jeremy Bobb) gets a fee from the widow of the corpse he retrieved from the Knick. Shaken by the woman's death, Cleary (Chris Sullivan) then takes Sister Harriet (Cara Seymour) to a pauper's cemetery, where he shows her the gravestones of many women who died from the abortions. He warns her that if she will perform abortions, she needs to be careful about the women's lives.

== Production ==
=== Development ===
In August 2014, Cinemax announced that the fourth episode of the season would be titled "Where's the Dignity?", and that it would be written by series creators Jack Amiel and Michael Begler, and directed by executive producer Steven Soderbergh. This was Amiel's fourth writing credit, Begler's fourth writing credit, and Soderbergh's fourth directing credit.

== Reception ==
=== Viewers ===
In its original American broadcast, "Where's the Dignity?" was seen by an estimated 0.374 million household viewers with a 0.13 in the 18-49 demographics. This means that 0.13 percent of all households with televisions watched the episode. This was a slight decrease in viewership from the previous episode, which was watched by an estimated 0.407 million household viewers with a 0.13 in the 18-49 demographics.

=== Critical reviews ===
"Where's the Dignity?" received positive reviews from critics. The review aggregator website Rotten Tomatoes reported an 90% approval rating for the episode, based on 10 reviews. The site's consensus states: "'Where's the Dignity?' delivers another electric hour of melodrama for The Knick, solidifying character relationships and following through on the tension built in previous episodes."

Matt Fowler of IGN gave the episode a "great" 8.6 out of 10 and wrote in his verdict, "The Knick is finally beginning to take shape outside of its style and score. This week, despite Thackery using that poor dead mother to do a little in-the-moment heart squeezing, it seemed to ditch the gross surgical barbarism that got a rise out of so many viewers during the first few episodes. The characters are starting to shine through more."

Brandon Nowalk of The A.V. Club gave the episode an "A–" grade and wrote, "episodes like 'Where's The Dignity' largely ride on what's happening and how, not that there's anything wrong with that. In fact, what's happening is wild."

Debbie Day of Entertainment Weekly wrote, "The Knick's medical staff members continue dancing around one another like chess pieces on a board, while others live or die by their moves." Keith Uhlich of Vulture gave the episode a 3 star rating out of 5 and wrote, "More so than any of the show's graphic surgeries, this gave me actual dry heaves, especially when McTeague slips on one of the creature’s bloody remains and falls among the surviving vermin. 'Rat' meet rats. As in the superb back alley fight scene that closed the previous episode, director Steven Soderbergh drowns out all the sound aside from Cliff Martinez's oscillating electronic score. So we're left with hellish imagery that functions almost subliminally — devoid of aural context, we wish even more that we weren't seeing what we're seeing."

Mike Hale of The New York Times wrote, "Friday night's episode, 'Where's the Dignity?,' was more of the same. The writing and plotting, by Jack Amiel and Michael Begler, was sufficient to the task. Everything else was good to superior, and scene by scene, even when the story bordered on melodrama or enlightened piety, the storytelling was believable, engaging, subtle and subtly humorous. That might not sound like such a high bar, but it's exceedingly rare in TV period dramas." Steve MacFarlane of Slant Magazine wrote, "It's the most breathtaking cross-section of Amiel and Begler's often club-footed historical observations yet, and the show's finest episode thus far: proof that, however irritating the procedure, Soderbergh's experiment is still working."

Gerri Mahn of Den of Geek gave the episode a perfect 5 star rating out of 5 and wrote, "All told, this was a pitch perfect fish out of water episode. Lucy in Chinatown, Edwards bringing diversity to the operating room and the Robertson's drawing room, and the health inspector squicking out the rich. How comfortable are you with white guilt and casual racism? Because there is none of the former and tons of the latter this episode. Did I say pitch perfect? Pitch freaking perfect! The episode closes with a crawling sense of (rabies laden) dread." Robert Ham of Paste gave the episode a 7.3 out of 10 and wrote, "The more they veer away from the hospital itself, the less interesting The Knick becomes."
