= Minor Adjustments =

- Genre: Sitcom
- Created by: Ken Estin; Dwayne Johnson-Cochran; Rondell Sheridan
- Starring: Rondell Sheridan; Wendy Raquel Robinson; Mitchell Whitfield; Linda Kash; Sara Rue; Bobby E. McAdams II; Camille Winbush
- Music by: Wendell Yuponce
- Country of origin: United States
- Original language: English
- No. of seasons: 1
- No. of episodes: 20

Production
- Executive producers: Ken Estin; Paul Junger Witt; Phil Kellard; Gary S. Levine; Thomas R. Moore; Tony Thomas; Dwayne Johnson-Cochran; Rondell Sheridan
- Producer: Gil Junger
- Running time: 30 minutes
- Production companies: Ken Estin Entertainment; Witt/Thomas Productions; Warner Bros. Television

Original release
- Network: NBC
- Release: September 16 – November 26, 1995
- Network: UPN
- Release: January 23 – June 4, 1996

Minor Adjustments is an American television sitcom that aired on NBC from September 16, 1995 until November 26, 1995, and on UPN from January 23, 1996 until June 4, 1996. The series starred stand-up comedian Rondell Sheridan in his first headlined television series, as a child psychologist and family man who has a remarkable ability to connect with his young patients. Sheridan co-created the series with Ken Estin and Dwayne Johnson-Cochran, and it was produced by Witt/Thomas Productions in association with Warner Bros. Television.

== Cast ==
- Rondell Sheridan as Dr. Ron Aimes
- Wendy Raquel Robinson as Rachel Aimes, Ron's wife
- Mitchell Whitfield as Dr. Bruce Hampton
- Linda Kash as Dr. Francine Bailey
- Sara Rue as Darby Gladstone, Bruce's niece
- Bobby E. McAdams II as Trevor Aimes, Ron & Rachel's son
- Camille Winbush as Emma Aimes, Ron & Rachel's daughter

== Episodes ==
No.	Title	Directed by	Written by	Original release date	Prod. code	Viewers (millions)
NBC
1	"Pilot"	Peter Bonerz	Ken Estin	September 16, 1995	001	9.0
Note: This is the first episode to air on NBC.
2	"The Paper"	Stan Lathan	Noah Taft	September 17, 1995	003	6.8
3	"Coach Ron"	Unknown	Ted Cohen & Andrew Reich	September 24, 1995	004	3.8
4	"Hoop Dreams"	Gary Halvorson	Michelle Jones	October 8, 1995	005	6.8
5	"Boo!"	Gary Halvorson	Jack Amiel & Michael Begler	October 30, 1995	008	12.7
6	"The Ex-Files"	Dennis Erdman	Phil Kellard & Tom Moore	November 12, 1995	007	4.8
7	"Everybody's Got a Secret"	Gary Halvorson	Michelle Jones	November 19, 1995	010	4.2
8	"The Far Out Internuts"	Stan Lathan	Jack Amiel & Michael Begler	November 26, 1995	002	N/A
Note: This is the final episode to air on NBC.
UPN
9	"Ask Dr. Ron"	Gil Junger	Jack Amiel & Michael Begler	January 23, 1996	014	4.5
Note: This is the first episode to air on UPN.
10	"The Ungrateful Dead"	Gil Junger	Phil Kellard & Tom Moore	January 30, 1996	015	4.2
11	"A Fish Story"	Gary Halvorson	Unknown	February 6, 1996	013	3.6
12	"Make My Day"	Gary Halvorson	Ken Estin	February 13, 1996	006	3.5
13	"My Fair Darby"	Dinah Manoff	Noah Taft	February 20, 1996	016	4.4
14	"Baba-Doo-Wang"	Gary Halvorson	Jack Amiel & Michael Begler	March 5, 1996	012	4.1
15	"The Way We Weren't"	Robert Berlinger	Michelle Jones	March 19, 1996	017	4.5
16	"Trevorgate"	Gary Halvorson	Ted Cohen & Andrew Reich	March 26, 1996	009	4.2
17	"Witness"	Gil Junger	Noah Taft	April 30, 1996	019	3.8
18	"Baby Boomer Angst"	Gil Junger	Reggie McFadden & Guy Torry	May 7, 1996	020	2.7
19	"The Model Wife"	Gil Junger	Ken Estin	May 14, 1996	018	2.8
20	"A Christmas Story"	Gil Junger	Noah Taft	June 4, 1996	011	3.2
