= Not Well at All =

- The Knick episode
- Episode no.: Season 2 Episode 8
- Directed by: Steven Soderbergh
- Written by: Steven Katz
- Cinematography by: Peter Andrews (Note: Pseudonym for Steven Soderbergh.)
- Editing by: Mary Ann Bernard
- Original release date: December 4, 2015
- Running time: 52 minutes

Guest appearances
- Jennifer Ferrin as Abigail Alford; Molly Price as Effie Barrow; Andrew Rannells as Frazier H. Wingo; Stephen Spinella as A.D. Elkins; Fred Weller as Mr. Brockhurst; Frank Wood as Mr. Havershorn; Perry Yung as Ping Wu; Annabelle Attanasio as Dorothy Walcott; Ken Barnett as Raphael Warren; Michael Berresse as Parke-Davis Representative; Tom Brangle as Frank Moorhouse; Ylfa Edelstein as Nurse Baker; Makenzie Leigh as Amy O'Connor; Angela McCluskey as Madam; Joseph McKenna as Man; Lucas Papaelias as Eldon Pouncey; Zachary Phillips as Wendell; Richard James Porter as Monsignor Joseph Mills Lawlor; Eugene Poznyak as Mr. Dominczyk; Dieter Riesle as Dr. Adolf Warner; Alyson Schacherer as Gladys; Zuzanna Szadkowski as Nurse Pell; David Townsend as Mr. Stern; Emily Young as Myrtle

Episode chronology
← Previous "Williams and Walker"	Next → "Do You Remember Moon Flower?"

"Not Well at All" is the eighth episode of the second season of the American medical period drama television series The Knick. It is the 18th overall episode of the series and was written by Steven Katz, and directed by executive producer Steven Soderbergh. It originally aired on Cinemax on December 4, 2015.

The series is set in New York City in the early twentieth century and follows the staff of the Knickerbocker Hospital (the Knick), who struggle against the limitations of medical understanding and practice. The protagonist is Dr. John Thackery, the new leader of the surgery staff, who balances his cocaine and opium addictions against his ambition for medical discovery and his reputation among his peers. In the episode, Barrow moves forward with his new life with Junia, while Gallinger faces more disturbing truths at home.

According to Nielsen Media Research, the episode was seen by an estimated 0.266 million household viewers and gained a 0.05 ratings share among adults aged 18–49. The episode received extremely positive reviews from critics, praising Soderbergh's directing and storylines.

== Plot ==
Brockhurst (Fred Weller) arrives at the Knick with a gun, threatening Thackery (Clive Owen) in returning Zoya and Nika. He is angered when Thackery informs him that the twins have been separated, but is then knocked unconscious when Cleary (Chris Sullivan) hits him with a baseball bat.

Barrow (Jeremy Bobb) visits Ping Wu (Perry Yung), paying him the needed sum to buy Junia (Rachel Korine) out of her duties. He also finishes the transactions needed for the new house. However, Effie (Molly Price) is called by the salesman and becomes delighted with "her" new house. She brings up the subject at dinner, but Barrow states she is not living with him. He informs her that he is also selling their house, giving her an apartment for her and the kids for a small time. Devastated, she leaves the dinner.

Gallinger (Gallinger) and Eleanor (Maya Kazan) are informed by a police officer that Dr. Henry Cotton has died from poisoning. As they were on his scheduled visits, he questions them over Cotton's behavior during their dinner. Privately, Eleanor tells Gallinger that she gave rat poisoning to Cotton. Disturbed, Gallinger has Eleanor committed to a mental institution once again.

Cornelia (Juliet Rylance) tells Henry (Charles Aitken) that August (Grainger Hines) may have been involved in Speight's murder, trying to cover up the smuggling of sick passengers past the health inspectors. Elkins (Eve Hewson) is called to a brothel, finding that A.D. (Stephen Spinella) suffered a stroke and takes him to the Knick for treatment. Cleary takes Sister Harriet (Cara Seymour) to a chamber of horrors, where he tries to kiss her. She angrily rejects his advances.

Edwards (André Holland) discovers Gallinger's eugenics surgeries and angrily informs Thackery about it. While Thackery agrees that it violates unethical conduct, he says he cannot do anything because it wasn't illegal and it never took place at the Knick. Later, Thackery prepares to operate Abigail (Jennifer Ferrin) on a new nose surgery, with the assistance of Elkins and Chickering (Michael Angarano). However, Abigail has a cardiac arrest due to an unexpected reaction to the anesthetic. Despite their best efforts, Abigail dies, stunning Thackery.

== Production ==
=== Development ===
In November 2015, Cinemax announced that the eighth episode of the season would be titled "Not Well at All", and that it would be written by Steven Katz, and directed by executive producer Steven Soderbergh. This was Katz's fourth writing credit, and Soderbergh's 18th directing credit.

== Reception ==
=== Viewers ===
In its original American broadcast, "Not Well at All" was seen by an estimated 0.266 million household viewers with a 0.05 in the 18-49 demographics. This means that 0.05 percent of all households with televisions watched the episode. This was a 24% decrease in viewership from the previous episode, which was watched by an estimated 0.347 million household viewers with a 0.09 in the 18-49 demographics.

=== Critical reviews ===
"Not Well at All" received extremely positive reviews from critics. The review aggregator website Rotten Tomatoes reported a 100% approval rating for the episode, based on 9 reviews.

Brandon Nowalk of The A.V. Club gave the episode an "A–" grade and wrote, "The Gothic horror has always been there for the plucking, and its effect is powerful. This year we don't just wince at the violence. We worry about what it means. We feel terror as much as wonder about the future." Kevin Jagernauth of IndieWire wrote, "It's a devastating loss for Thack, and one can only imagine and fear what will happen now that the barest shreds of humanity keeping him together have fallen apart. Even more, his stomach pains are getting worse, and while turpentine offers temporary relief, it's only a matter of time before his physical and emotional pain can no longer be patched over, and consume him wholly."

Sarene Leeds of Entertainment Weekly wrote, "The episode's title, 'Not Well at All', pertains to Eleanor Gallinger and her self-realization that she's gone completely crackers — but the same can absolutely be said for John Thackery as we head into The Knick's final, two-episode stretch." Ivy Pochoda of Vulture gave the episode a 4 star rating out of 5 and wrote, "Well, we're certainly used to things going wrong at the Knick. That's par for the course in the developing field of medicine where the best miracles are often followed by tragic failures. But I wasn't prepared for this week's heartbreak, especially since things were looking promising."

Mike Hale of The New York Times wrote, "There was an enormous amount of incident in the episode, and Steven Soderbergh kept things moving at breakneck pace, squeezing (by my count) 32 separate scenes into about 50 minutes. He seemed to be drawing attention to the rapidity, occasionally starting the dialogue or sound effects for a scene before the previous one had finished." Steve MacFarlane of Slant Magazine wrote, "If there's merit in the idea of pretending each season of The Knick is one 10-hour-long movie, 'Not Well at All' more than matches the position staked by the first season's eighth episode: a headlong plunge into bleakness that abridges and re-contextualizes earlier breakthrough moments."

Alec Bojalad of Den of Geek gave the episode a 3 star rating out of 5 and wrote, "'Not Well At All' is one of the weakest episodes of The Knick's run thus far. The Knick is too well-crafted to be ever be outright bad or boring but 'Not Well At All' is about as close to bad as a show produced with such talent and purpose can be." Robert Ham of Paste gave the episode a 9.6 out of 10 and wrote, "As we totter toward the end of this second season, we are now in a holding period, waiting for the other shoes to start falling from the sky like hailstones. Time enough to brace ourselves for the eventual comeuppance of Herman Barrow, the possible end of Gallinger's surgical career, and what could be a nasty bit of business when Captain Robertson's hand in the spread of the bubonic plague comes to light."
