= Perry Mason (2020 TV series) =

2020 American period drama television series

- Poster for the first season
- Genre: Crime drama; Detective fiction; Legal drama; Historical drama; Neo-noir
- Created by: Rolin Jones; Ron Fitzgerald
- Based on: Characters by Erle Stanley Gardner
- Showrunners: Rolin Jones; Ron Fitzgerald; Jack Amiel; Michael Begler
- Starring: Matthew Rhys; Juliet Rylance; Chris Chalk; Shea Whigham; Tatiana Maslany; John Lithgow; Justin Kirk; Diarra Kilpatrick; Eric Lange; Katherine Waterston
- Composer: Terence Blanchard
- Country of origin: United States
- Original language: English
- No. of seasons: 2
- No. of episodes: 16

Production
- Executive producers: Rolin Jones; Ron Fitzgerald; Robert Downey Jr.; Susan Downey; Amanda Burrell; Joe Horaceck; Tim Van Patten; Michael Begler; Jack Amiel; Matthew Rhys
- Cinematography: David Franco; Darran Tiernan
- Editor: Mako Kamitsuna
- Running time: 56–64 minutes
- Production companies: HBO Entertainment; Dwight Street Book Club; Inflatable Moose Inc.; Team Downey
- Budget: $74.3 million (s. 1) (Note: This amount represents the total qualified expenditures for the California Film & Television Tax Credit and excludes other non-qualifying costs.)

Original release
- Network: HBO
- Release: June 21, 2020 – April 24, 2023

Perry Mason is an American historical drama television series created by Rolin Jones and Ron Fitzgerald for HBO. Based on the character of the same name by Erle Stanley Gardner, the series stars Matthew Rhys in the title role and premiered on June 21, 2020. The second season premiered on March 6, 2023.

The series received generally positive reviews from critics with praise towards the cinematography, production design, and performances of its cast, particularly Rhys. In June 2023, the series was canceled after two seasons.

== Premise ==
The series focuses on the origin story of famed defense lawyer Perry Mason. In 1932, Los Angeles is prospering while the rest of the U.S. is recovering from the grip of the Great Depression. Down-and-out private investigator Perry Mason is struggling with his trauma from The Great War and being divorced. He is hired for a sensational child kidnapping trial; his investigation results in major consequences for Mason, those around him, and local leaders.

== Cast and characters ==
=== Main ===
- Matthew Rhys as Perry Mason, a low-rent private investigator who later becomes a lawyer
- Juliet Rylance as Della Street, the loyal and driven legal secretary of E.B. Jonathan
- Chris Chalk as Paul Drake, a beat cop with a knack for detective work
- Shea Whigham as Peter "Pete" Strickland (season 1; recurring season 2), Mason's work partner
- Tatiana Maslany as Sister Alice McKeegan (season 1), a preacher and leader of the Radiant Assembly of God
- John Lithgow as Elias Birchard "E.B." Jonathan (season 1), a struggling attorney and regular employer of Perry Mason
- Justin Kirk as Hamilton Burger (season 2; recurring season 1), assistant district attorney offering Mason legal advice
- Diarra Kilpatrick as Clara Drake (season 2; recurring season 1), Paul's wife
- Eric Lange as Eugene "Gene" Holcomb (season 2; recurring season 1), an LAPD homicide detective
- Katherine Waterston as Virginia "Ginny" Szymanski Aimes (season 2), an optimistic schoolteacher of Perry's son, Theodore ("Teddy")

=== Recurring ===
- Verónica Falcón as Lupe Gibbs, an accomplished pilot and the owner of a speakeasy who has a sexual relationship with Mason
- Molly Ephraim as Hazel Prystock, a hand model who is Della's fellow boarding house tenant and secret romantic partner
- Gretchen Mol as Linda Mason, Perry's ex-wife

==== Season 1 ====
- Gayle Rankin as Emily Dodson, the mother of Charlie Dodson, a one-year-old child who is mysteriously kidnapped and murdered (Note: Rankin makes cameo appearances in the first and fourth episodes of the second season, haunting Mason as Dodson drowned herself unable to overcome her grief at losing her baby boy.)
- Nate Corddry as Matthew Dodson, a grocery store owner whose one-year-old son, Charlie, is kidnapped and murdered
- Jefferson Mays as Virgil Sheets, an attendant at the city morgue and a friend of Mason's
- Stephen Root as Maynard Barnes, the formidable district attorney of Los Angeles County
- Andrew Howard as Joseph "Joe" Ennis, an LAPD homicide detective
- Robert Patrick as Herman Baggerly, Matthew's father, a powerful industrialist in Southern California who hires E.B. and Mason to investigate the kidnapping
- Lili Taylor as Birdy McKeegan, Alice's mother and advisor
- Matt Frewer as Judge Frederick "Fred" Wright, the judge in the Charlie Dodson murder case
- David Wilson Barnes as Elder Ethan Brown, a member of the Radiant Assembly of God
- Taylor Nichols as Elder/Deacon Eric Q. Seidel, a member of the Radiant Assembly of God
- Aaron Stanford as George "Pinky Ring" Gannon, a man with a critical connection to the Dodson case
- Jenny O'Hara as June Pitlick, the owner of the boarding house where Della Street lives
- Michael McMillian as Oliver Fogg, one of Della's fellow lodgers
- Todd Weeks as James "Jim" Hicks, an accountant who worked for George Gannon and others
- Andrew Divoff as Al Howard, the owner of the casino where George Gannon worked

==== Season 2 ====
- Tommy Dewey as Brooks McCutcheon, a wealthy oil scion and a philanthropist with a darker side who aspires to bring a baseball team to Los Angeles
- Paul Raci as Lydell McCutcheon, Brooks' father, a ruthless businessman who succeeded his empire to his son
- Kersti Bryan as Elizabeth McCutcheon, Brooks' widow
- Jee Young Han as Marion Kang, Mason's new secretary
- Sean Astin as Sunny Gryce, a dueling supermarket owner Mason represents
- Jen Tullock as Anita St. Pierre, a self-made screenwriter Della meets and is attracted to
- Mark O'Brien as Thomas Milligan, Hamilton Burger's deputy in charge of the Brooks McCutcheon murder case
- Onohoua Rodriguez as Luisa Gallardo, the aunt of the Gallardo brothers who are accused of murdering Brooks McCutcheon
- Fabrizio Guido as Rafael Gallardo, an 18-year-old Mexican-American artist accused of murdering McCutcheon
- Peter Mendoza as Mateo Gallardo, Rafael's unemployed 20-year-old elder brother and an aspiring mechanic, also accused of murdering McCutcheon
- Stephanie Hoston as Sofia Gallardo, Mateo's wife and the mother of the couple's young daughter Maria
- Hope Davis as Camilla Nygaard, the rival of the McCutcheon family in the oil business
- Danielle Gross as Noreen Lawson, Brooks' former flame
- Andrea Gabriel as Constance Barbour, a gifted pianist once taught by Camilla
- Wallace Langham as Melville Phipps, a Los Angeles native and the attorney of Camilla Nygaard
- Tom Amandes as Judge Durkin, the Gallardo trial judge
- Jon Chaffin as Morris, Clara's brother and Paul's brother-in-law
- John DiMaggio as "Fighting" Frank Finnerty, a conservative radio personality on Lydell McCutcheon's payroll

== Episodes ==
Season	Episodes	Originally released	
Season	Episodes	First released	Last released
1	8	June 21, 2020	August 9, 2020
2	8	March 6, 2023	April 24, 2023

=== Season 1 (2020) ===
No. overall	No. in season	Title	Directed by	Written by	Original release date	U.S. viewers (millions)
1	1	"Chapter One"	Tim Van Patten	Teleplay by : Rolin Jones & Ron Fitzgerald	June 21, 2020	0.884
In late 1931 Los Angeles, private investigator Perry Mason is assigned by his friend and mentor, attorney E.B. Jonathan, to investigate the case of Charlie Dodson, a baby boy who was kidnapped and had his eyes stitched open after his death. As Mason follows the case, corrupt detective Joe Ennis visits Charlie's kidnappers, killing two of them and watching as the third falls off a roof to his death.
2	2	"Chapter Two"	Tim Van Patten	Rolin Jones & Ron Fitzgerald	June 28, 2020	0.799
Ennis and his colleague Detective Gene Holcomb, as well as Los Angeles district attorney Maynard Barnes, accost Charlie's father Matthew with evidence planted by Ennis and reveal Baggerly is Matthew's father; Matthew is arrested for conspiracy to kidnap Charlie. Mason and Baggerly begin to distrust each other. Adept police officer Paul Drake finds the bodies of two of the kidnappers. He is later questioned by Holcomb and Ennis, who treat him with bigoted condescension and tell him to revise his report to fit Ennis's narrative. Mason tracks a series of mysterious phone calls made by Charlie's mother Emily to a man named George Gannon, finding him dead of apparent suicide, the ransom money burned, and letters proving an affair with Emily. At Charlie's funeral, Emily is publicly arrested due to Mason's findings.
3	3	"Chapter Three"	Tim Van Patten	Rolin Jones & Ron Fitzgerald	July 5, 2020	0.950
Barnes seeks a conspiracy conviction for Charlie's mother Emily as well as the death penalty. At Emily's arraignment, unrest erupts when Emily nearly enters a guilty plea and Barnes requests a $25,000 bail, which the judge accepts. Believing Emily's guilt, Baggerly abruptly stops funding Jonathan and his team. Meanwhile, Mason's partner, Pete Strickland, digs up information that ties Gannon to a job at a local casino, but Gannon's former boss tells Mason he left voluntarily for religious reasons. Increasingly convinced Gannon was set up, Mason seeks out Drake for clarity on Drake's police report; Drake refuses to speak with him, having been threatened by Ennis. Della Street, Jonathan's secretary, discovers Ennis and Holcomb attempting to coerce a confession out of Emily. Evangelist Alice McKeegan claims God told her to "resurrect" Charlie.
4	4	"Chapter Four"	Deniz Gamze Ergüven	Steven Hanna & Sarah Kelly Kaplan	July 12, 2020	0.711
Horrified by Alice's claim, Baggerly and the other bankrollers of the church demand a retraction after her statement reaches the newspapers. Alice instead proclaims Emily's innocence and reaffirms her statement, splintering the church. Mason and Strickland, having stolen Gannon's body, dump it onto a golf course in order to coax an official autopsy out of coroner Virgil Sheets. Additionally, while retracing the steps of the kidnappers, they discover the building used for the ransom location connects to an Elks Lodge and Ennis in attendance at an event. They share their evidence and theories with Jonathan, who attempts to use them to get Barnes to drop charges, only for Barnes to threaten him with spurious claims of larceny that would get him disbarred. Jonathan urges Emily to fight. The next day, Jonathan commits suicide in his kitchen.
5	5	"Chapter Five"	Deniz Gamze Ergüven	Eleanor Burgess	July 19, 2020	0.884
After Street finds Jonathan's body, she and Mason cover up his suicide as a natural death and return his body to the family plot in northern California, finding that E.B. had long been estranged from the rest of his family, including his son Byron. Following the trip, Mason visits his son Theodore and ex-wife Linda. Strickland begins tailing Ennis and eventually finds him at a Chinatown brothel. After Emily's new court-appointed lawyer makes a negative first impression, Street discovers he is working with Barnes. As Mason's rage at the legal system reaches a breaking point, Street forges documentation that Mason had been serving a legal apprenticeship under E.B. Emily accepts Mason as her new representation. Aided by deputy district attorney Hamilton Burger, Mason passes the bar and becomes a lawyer.
6	6	"Chapter Six"	Deniz Gamze Ergüven	Kevin J. Hynes	July 26, 2020	0.959
The trial starts off poorly when Mason struggles to deliver his opening statement and Barnes calls a surprise witness. Strickland travels to Colorado to discover that Ennis worked for church deacon Eric Seidel years prior. Street uses Strickland's information to find evidence implicating Baggerly and others to shell companies owned by the church. Barnes's final witness, the guard from Emily's jail block, falsely testifies overhearing a confession by Emily during Alice's visit, which causes chaos in the courtroom.
7	7	"Chapter Seven"	Tim Van Patten	Howard Korder	August 2, 2020	1.038
Jim Hicks, the former accountant for the church, reveals to Mason that he participated in a scheme headed by church deacon Eric Seidel. Strickland informs Mason that Ennis and the two dead kidnappers worked as strikebreakers under Seidel for a mining company in 1914. Ennis meets Seidel under the guise of helping him leave town and murders him. Drake tracks the kidnappers' movements to a hotel and is informed by a maid that Ennis showed up with a woman to calm a crying Charlie. Drake and Mason track down a baby they believe may be Charlie.
8	8	"Chapter Eight"	Tim Van Patten	Rolin Jones & Ron Fitzgerald & Kevin J. Hynes	August 9, 2020	1.115
The trial comes to a close. After five days of deliberation, the jury becomes deadlocked and the judge declares a mistrial. Emily accepts the baby as Charlie and joins Birdy's church. Strickland leaves Mason to work for Burger, now prosecuting the church's financial crimes. Drake resigns from the police force, while Holcomb has Ennis killed. Mason moves into Jonathan's office, taking on Street as his secretary and Drake as his lead detective.

=== Season 2 (2023) ===
No. overall	No. in season	Title	Directed by	Written by	Original release date	U.S. viewers (millions)
9	1	"Chapter Nine"	Fernando Coimbra	Jack Amiel & Michael Begler	March 6, 2023	0.372
In 1933, months after the Dodson trial, an aimless Mason leans on Street to keep the law firm afloat via civil cases. While Drake accepts a job from an unlikely source, corrupt oil scion Brooks McCutcheon recruits Detective Holcomb in his quest to reshape Los Angeles, but is unfortunately murdered.
10	2	"Chapter Ten"	Fernando Coimbra	Jack Amiel & Michael Begler	March 13, 2023	N/A
While Burger, now the district attorney, focuses on two brothers living in a vagrant camp in the Vernon area, Mateo and Rafael Gallardo, as the prime suspects in Brooks' murder, a discovery pushes Mason closer to the case. Later, Street goes on a date with a new flame, Anita St. Pierre, while Drake wrestles with a shocking truth.
11	3	"Chapter Eleven"	Jessica Lowrey	Jack Amiel & Michael Begler	March 20, 2023	0.299
While Rafael and Mateo are discriminated in both jail and court, Mason confronts Brooks' father Lydell, and Street gets help from Camilla Nygaard, the rival of the McCutcheon family in the oil business.
12	4	"Chapter Twelve"	Jessica Lowrey	Jack Amiel & Michael Begler	March 27, 2023	0.333
Drake's shocking discovery brings the brothers' testimony into question. Mason pursues a plea deal. Street continues her search for answers.
13	5	"Chapter Thirteen"	Marialy Rivas	Niko Gutierrez-Kovner	April 3, 2023	0.309
Facing potential life in prison without the possibility of parole, Rafael recounts a deadly incident caused by the McCutcheons, in which his and Mateo's sister Rosanna perished. Drake searches for a possible accomplice landing him in danger, and Mason makes a convincing demonstration in court.
14	6	"Chapter Fourteen"	Marialy Rivas	Elizabeth Baxa	April 10, 2023	0.324
Having been subpoenaed, Holcomb helps Mason with some vital information to push the verdict in the Gallardos' favor, only for Mason to be blindsided: the prosecution informs the judge that the murder weapon is in Mason's office. Street continues to foster her relationships with Nygaard and St. Pierre.
15	7	"Chapter Fifteen"	Nina Lopez-Corrado	Mauricio Katz & Pedro Peirano	April 17, 2023	0.455
Facing career-ending accusations and potential jailtime, Mason must turn to Strickland for help. With the Gallardos' fate in the balance, Street presses Burger for answers, while Drake and his wife Clara chase a dangerous lead.
16	8	"Chapter Sixteen"	Nina Lopez-Corrado	Michael Begler	April 24, 2023	0.443
As their final day in court nears, Mateo and Rafael prepare for the worst, while Mason, Street, and Drake work with an unlikely ally to sway the prosecution's hand. LGBT photos of Burger come to Mason's attention with Street's help, and Mason faces the consequences of his relentless pursuit of justice.

== Production ==
=== Development ===
On August 15, 2016, it was reported that HBO was developing a drama series based on the Perry Mason stories written by Erle Stanley Gardner. The production was expected to be written by Nic Pizzolatto, who was also set to executive produce alongside Robert Downey Jr. and Joe Horacek. Production companies involved with the series were slated to consist of Team Downey. On August 25, 2017, it was announced that Pizzolatto had dropped out of the production in order to focus on the third season of True Detective and that he was being replaced as the project's writer by Rolin Jones and Ron Fitzgerald. The HBO revival and reboot adapted its setting to Great Depression-era Los Angeles, some twenty years earlier than the CBS show (but in line with the earliest novels by Gardner).

On January 14, 2019, it was announced that HBO had given the production an order as a limited series. It was further announced that Jones, Fitzgerald, Susan Downey, and Amanda Burrell would serve as additional executive producers, that Matthew Rhys would serve as a producer, and that the production was in the process of hiring a director. Jones and Fitzgerald serve as showrunners for the series as well. In March, Tim Van Patten was announced as director and executive producer. On July 22, 2020, it was revealed HBO had decided to turn Perry Mason into a regular series, renewing it for a second season. On April 23, 2021, it was announced Jones and Fitzgerald left the series and were replaced as showrunners by Jack Amiel and Michael Begler. On June 6, 2023, HBO canceled the series after two seasons.

=== Casting ===
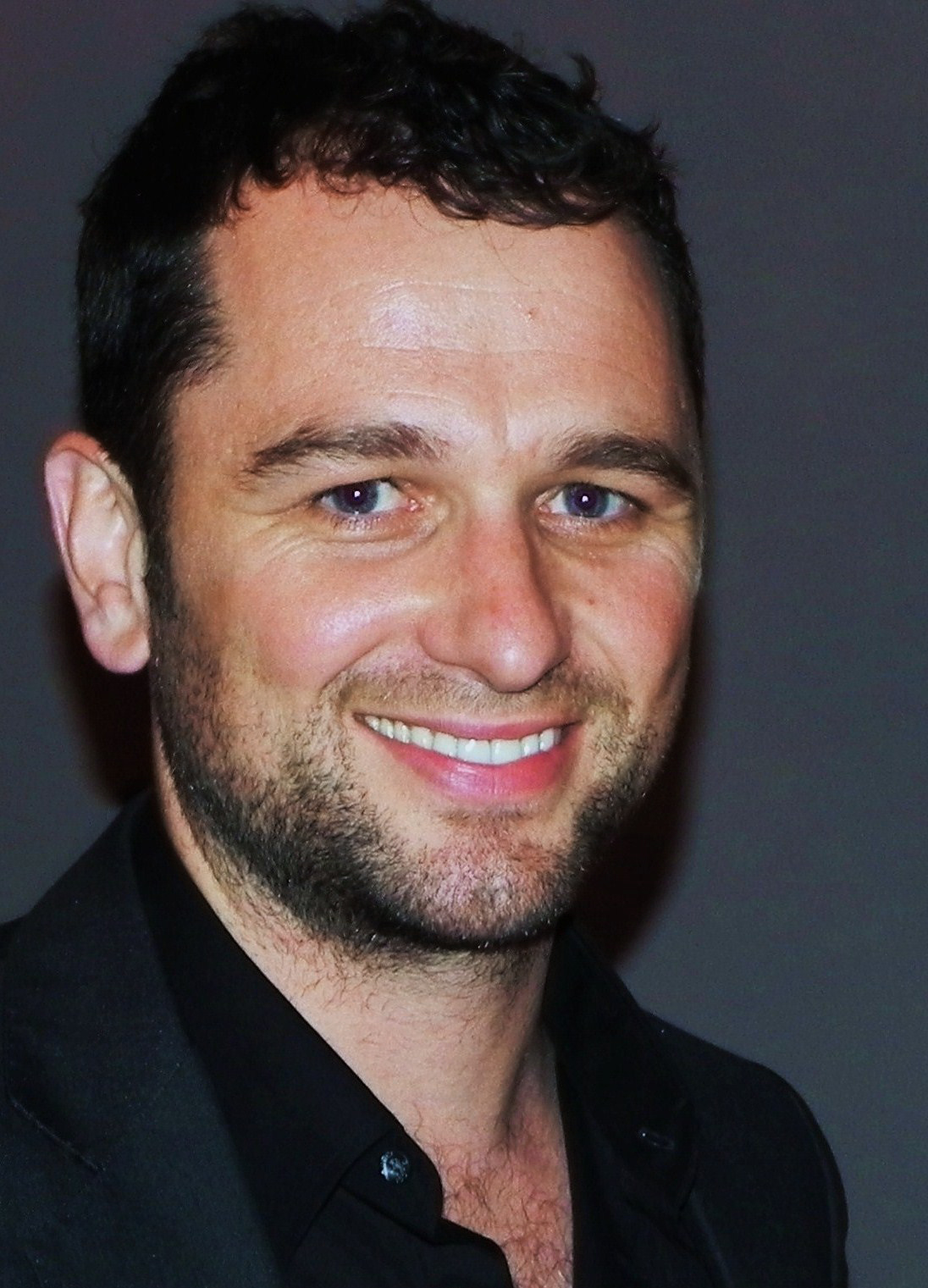
Matthew Rhys replaced Robert Downey Jr. who was initially announced to star as Perry Mason after scheduling issues. Downey still served as an executive producer for the series.

Alongside the initial development announcement, it was said that Robert Downey Jr. would star as the titular Perry Mason. On July 25, 2018, it was reported that Downey had dropped out of the role due to his feature film schedule and that a search for his replacement was ongoing. On January 14, 2019, it was announced that Matthew Rhys had been cast to replace Downey. Tatiana Maslany joined in April. John Lithgow was added to the cast in May. In June, Chris Chalk and Shea Whigham were cast in lead roles, with Nate Corddry, Veronica Falcón, Jefferson Mays, Gayle Rankin and Lili Taylor set in recurring roles. Juliet Rylance, Andrew Howard, Eric Lange, Robert Patrick and Stephen Root joined in July. Justin Kirk would be added in October. In "Chapter Five", Lithgow's real-life son Ian appears as E.B. Jonathan's son Byron.

For the second season, Lange and Kirk were promoted to series regulars. Diarra Kilpatrick, who recurred in season 1 as Clara Drake, was upgraded to series regular in October 2021 in addition to Katherine Waterston joining as a new series regular, and Hope Davis among five cast in recurring roles. In January 2022, it was announced Whigham would be returning in a recurring capacity, while Sean Astin, Tommy Dewey, Paul Raci and Jen Tullock were cast in recurring roles.

== Release ==
The series premiered on June 21, 2020, on HBO and HBO Max. The second season premiered on March 6, 2023.

=== Home media ===
The first season was released on Blu-ray and DVD on December 1, 2020.

== Reception ==
=== Viewership ===
With 1.7 million viewers across all platforms, the debut of Perry Mason was the strongest of any HBO series for two years.

==== Season 1 ====
Viewership and ratings per episode of Perry Mason
No.	Title	Air date	Rating (18–49)	Viewers (millions)	DVR (18–49)	DVR viewers (millions)	Total (18–49)	Total viewers (millions)
1	"Chapter One"	June 21, 2020	0.1	0.884	0.1	0.604	0.2	1.488
2	"Chapter Two"	June 28, 2020	0.1	0.799	0.1	0.656	0.2	1.455
3	"Chapter Three"	July 5, 2020	0.1	0.950	0.1	0.633	0.2	1.583
4	"Chapter Four"	July 12, 2020	0.1	0.711	0.1	0.583	0.2	1.294
5	"Chapter Five"	July 19, 2020	0.1	0.884	0.1	0.567	0.2	1.451
6	"Chapter Six"	July 26, 2020	0.1	0.959	0.1	0.720	0.2	1.679
7	"Chapter Seven"	August 2, 2020	0.1	1.038	0.1	0.658	0.2	1.696
8	"Chapter Eight"	August 9, 2020	0.1	1.115	0.1	0.640	0.2	1.755

=== Critical response ===
==== Season 1 ====
On review aggregator website Rotten Tomatoes, season one holds an approval rating of 75% based on 84 reviews, with an average rating of 7.3/10. The site's critics consensus reads: "Brimming with top notch performances and dripping in style, Perry Mason's compelling mystery more than makes up for its somewhat messy story." On Metacritic, the season has a weighted average score of 68 out of 100, based on 39 critics, indicating "generally favorable" reviews.

Ben Travers of IndieWire said that season one is "built with confidence, patience, and a voice calibrated for today's audiences" and gave it a "B+", writing: "Perry Mason stands as an astounding visual feat for its specific framings as well as its overall world-building. There are striking images of a pitch-black profile and lavish outdoor shots of real Los Angeles locations. In some shows, intimate conversations between two people can clash with the grander scenes... Mason has the intuition (and the budget) to not just balance visual opulence with smaller, private moments, but to blend them."

==== Season 2 ====
Season two holds an approval rating of 85% based on 33 reviews, with an average rating of 7.4/10. The site's critics consensus reads: "More cohesive and engaging than its woolly first installment, Perry Mason's sophomore season is a marked improvement driven by an urgent sense of purpose, with Matthew Rhys commandingly watchable as ever." On Metacritic, the season has a weighted average score of 71 out of 100, based on 19 critics, indicating "generally favorable" reviews.

=== Accolades ===
Year	Award	Category	Nominee(s)	Result	Ref.
2021	American Society of Cinematographers Awards	Outstanding Achievement in Cinematography in an Episode of a One-Hour Television Series – Non-Commercial	David Franco (for "Chapter Three")	Nominated	
2021	Art Directors Guild Awards	Excellence in Production Design for a One-Hour Period or Fantasy Single-Camera Series	John Perry Goldsmith (for "Chapter Three")	Nominated	
2021	Critics' Choice Television Awards	Best Drama Series	Perry Mason	Nominated	
2021	Critics' Choice Television Awards	Best Actor in a Drama Series	Matthew Rhys	Nominated	
2021	Critics' Choice Television Awards	Best Supporting Actor in a Drama Series	John Lithgow	Nominated	
2021	Golden Globe Awards	Best Actor – Television Series Drama	Matthew Rhys	Nominated	
2021	Hollywood Critics Association TV Awards	Best Cable Series, Drama	Perry Mason	Nominated	
2021	Hollywood Critics Association TV Awards	Best Actor in a Broadcast Network or Cable Series, Drama	Matthew Rhys	Nominated	
2021	Hollywood Critics Association TV Awards	Best Supporting Actor in a Broadcast Network or Cable Series, Drama	John Lithgow	Nominated	
2021	Hollywood Critics Association TV Awards	Best Supporting Actress in a Broadcast Network or Cable Series, Drama	Tatiana Maslany	Won	
2021	Make-Up Artists and Hair Stylists Guild Awards	Best Television Series, Limited or Miniseries or New Media Series – Best Period and/or Character Make-Up	Christien Tinsley, Corinne Foster, Steve Costanza and Gerry Quist	Nominated	
2021	Primetime Emmy Awards	Outstanding Lead Actor in a Drama Series	Matthew Rhys (for "Chapter Eight")	Nominated	
2021	Primetime Emmy Awards	Outstanding Supporting Actor in a Drama Series	John Lithgow (for "Chapter Four")	Nominated	
2021	Primetime Creative Arts Emmy Awards	Outstanding Cinematography for a Single-Camera Series (One Hour)	David Franco (for "Chapter Two")	Nominated	
2021	Primetime Creative Arts Emmy Awards	Outstanding Production Design for a Narrative Period or Fantasy Program (One Hour or More)	John Goldsmith, Chris Farmer and Halina Siwolop (for "Chapter Three")	Nominated	
2021	Satellite Awards	Best Actor in a Drama / Genre Series	Matthew Rhys	Nominated	
2021	Saturn Awards	Best Television Presentation (under 10 Episodes)	Perry Mason	Nominated	
