= Raising Helen =

2004 film by Garry Marshall

- Theatrical release poster
- Directed by: Garry Marshall
- Screenplay by: Jack Amiel; Michael Begler
- Story by: Patrick J. Clifton; Beth Rigazio
- Produced by: Ashok Amritraj; David Hoberman
- Starring: Kate Hudson; John Corbett; Joan Cusack; Hayden Panettiere; Spencer Breslin; Helen Mirren
- Cinematography: Charles Minsky
- Edited by: Bruce Green
- Music by: John Debney
- Production companies: Touchstone Pictures; Beacon Pictures; Hyde Park Entertainment; Mandeville Films
- Distributed by: Buena Vista Pictures Distribution
- Release date: May 28, 2004
- Running time: 119 minutes
- Country: United States
- Language: English
- Budget: $50 million
- Box office: $49.7 million

Raising Helen is a 2004 American comedy-drama film directed by Garry Marshall and written by Jack Amiel and Michael Begler. It stars Kate Hudson, John Corbett, Joan Cusack, Hayden Panettiere, siblings Spencer and Abigail Breslin, and Helen Mirren. The film follows Helen Harris (Hudson), who finds herself as the legal guardian of her sister's children after her sister and brother-in-law are killed in a car accident. Raising Helen was released by Buena Vista Pictures Distribution on May 28, 2004. It received negative reviews from critics and grossed $49.7 million worldwide against a $50 million budget, making it a box office bomb.

== Plot ==
Helen, Jenny, and Lindsay Harris are close sisters living in New York; the eldest Jenny raised the other two after their mother died when they were young. Jenny and Lindsay are responsible stay-at-home mothers while Helen, an executive assistant to the CEO of one of Manhattan's most prestigious modeling agencies, enjoys a lavish, carefree lifestyle.

One morning, Helen receives a call from Jenny who tells her Lindsay and her husband Paul have died in a car accident, leaving behind their three children, 15-year-old Audrey, 10-year-old Henry, and 5-year-old Sarah. At an appointment with Lindsay's attorney, Helen and Jenny are shocked to discover Lindsay has appointed Helen the guardian of the children. Both sisters are given a letter that Lindsay had left for them.

Forced to give up her wild lifestyle and move to Queens, Helen initially struggles to raise the children on her own. As time goes by, her concentration at work begins to slip and she is fired as a result, leading her to become a receptionist at a car dealership. Helen and Jenny get into a fight about how best to raise the children and they stop talking. Things later start to improve for Helen after she begins dating Dan Parker, the children's school principal and pastor, who helps her bond with them.

Audrey starts to fall in with the wrong crowd at school and gets an older boyfriend called BZ. When she disappears after prom, Helen is forced to call Jenny for backup, too scared to take control of the situation on her own in fear that Audrey will hate her if confronted. Audrey is found at a motel with BZ, and Helen later turns the children over to Jenny's custody, much to their dismay.

Helen goes back to work and slowly returns to her previous way of living, but soon realizes she is not happy. She goes to Jenny's to take the children back, adamant she is ready to put her foot down and be a mother, but Jenny asks her to leave and think about it some more. Later that night, as Helen sits alone in the nearby park, Jenny appears and allows Helen to read her letter from Lindsay; in it, Lindsay explains she chose Helen to care for her children because their personalities are so similar and she wanted the children to have a mother figure who reminds them of her.

Finally having accepted Helen can cope, Jenny returns the children to her the following morning, and they happily begin to settle into their new family life.

== Cast ==
- Kate Hudson as Helen Harris
- John Corbett as Pastor Dan Parker, Helen's love interest
- Joan Cusack as Jenny Portman, Helen and Lindsay's older sister
- Hayden Panettiere as Audrey Davis, Helen's niece
- Spencer Breslin as Henry Davis, Helen's nephew
- Abigail Breslin as Sarah Davis, Helen's niece
- Helen Mirren as Dominique
- Felicity Huffman as Lindsay Davis, Helen's older sister, Jenny's younger sister and Audrey, Henry and Sarah's late mother
- Kevin Kilner as Ed Portman, Jenny's husband
- Sakina Jaffrey as Nilma Prasad
- Joseph Mazzello as Prom Date Peter
- Sean O'Bryan as Paul Davis, Lindsay's husband and Audrey, Henry and Sarah's late father
- Catherine Tayrien as Jasmine Portman, Jenny and Ed's daughter
- Evan Sabara (Note: Originally credited as Evan Sabara, who came out as Eve, a trans woman, in 2020.) as Oliver Portman, Jenny and Ed's son
- Paris Hilton as Amber
- Amber Valletta as Martina
- Ethan Browne as Devon
- Shannon Wilcox as photographer
- Frank Campanella as mourner
- Michael Esparza as BZ
- Katie Carr as Caitlin
- Rio Hackford as brunch maitre d'
- Héctor Elizondo as Mickey Massey
- Larry Miller as Leo D'Leo
- Shakara Ledard as Tinka (the model)

== Music ==
The 1980 Devo song "Whip It" was featured in the film.

== Release ==
The film was shown at the 2004 Tribeca Film Festival. It was released theatrically in the United States on May 28, 2004. In US theaters, the film was preceded by an animated short film from Walt Disney Feature Animation titled Lorenzo, about a cat who gets his tail jinxed and comes to life.

=== Box office ===
The film opened at number four on opening weekend, making $10.9 million. In North America, the film earned $37.5 million. In other territories, it made $12.2 million. The film grossed a total of $49.7 million worldwide against a production budget of $50 million, making the film a box-office bomb.

=== Critical reception ===
Raising Helen received mostly negative reviews from critics. On the review aggregator website Rotten Tomatoes, the film holds an approval rating of 25% based on 133 reviews, with an average rating of 4.7/10. The website's critics consensus reads, "As shallow and formulaic as a sitcom." Metacritic, which uses a weighted average, assigned the film a score of 38 out of 100, based on reviews from 34 critics, indicating "generally unfavorable reviews". Audiences polled by CinemaScore gave the film an average grade of "B+" on an A+ to F scale.

=== Home media ===
The film was released on DVD and VHS on October 12, 2004. The film was not released on Blu-ray.
