= Michael Begler =

American film producer

- Born: Long Island, New York
- Education: University of Wisconsin–Madison
- Occupations: Television writer, screenwriter, producer, showrunner
- Writing career
- Notable works: The Knick; Raising Helen; The Shaggy Dog; Big Miracle

Michael Begler is an American television writer, producer and screenwriter. He is best known for co-creating Cinemax's period medical drama The Knick, and for writing the films Raising Helen (2004), The Shaggy Dog (2006) and Big Miracle (2012), all with writing partner Jack Amiel.

== Early life ==
Begler was born and raised in Long Island, New York. He attended the University of Wisconsin-Madison, where he majored in English.

He met his future writing partner Jack Amiel while they were in college together and both entered the university's musical-comedy contest, Humorology.

== Career ==
After college, Begler moved to New York and worked as a PA on The Cosby Show. He and Amiel, who was working as a PA in Los Angeles, decided to write together shortly after, and Begler soon joined Amiel in Los Angeles. Their first writing job was on Fox's Herman's Head.

Begler worked consistently from that point onwards, writing - with Amiel - on a number of sitcoms, including Empty Nest, Minor Adjustments, The Jeff Foxworthy Show, The Tony Danza Show and Malcolm in the Middle.

In the mid-2000s, Begler transitioned into writing feature films, penning the scripts for the romantic comedies The Prince and Me and Garry Marshall's Raising Helen, both released in 2004. In 2006, Begler wrote Disney's The Shaggy Dog, starring Tim Allen and Robert Downey Jr.

Begler wrote 2012's Ken Kwapis-directed Big Miracle starring Drew Barrymore. Cinemax picked up Begler and Amiel's The Knick to series, after they wrote the pilot script on spec. Steven Soderbergh came on board the series as director and executive producer. Begler and Amiel served as co-showrunners and executive producers, and wrote the majority of the series' episodes. The series premiered on August 8, 2014. It was renewed for a second season of 10 episodes, airing October 2015. In April 2021, it was announced that Bagler and Amiel will serve as an executive producers and showrunners for second season of Perry Mason. Around the same time, he signed an overall deal with HBO.

== Filmography ==
Films

Year	Title	Role	Notes
2004	The Prince and Me	Screenplay by	
2004	Raising Helen	Screenplay by	
2006	The Shaggy Dog	Screenplay by	
2007	Hell on Earth	Written by	TV movie; also Executive Producer
2012	Big Miracle	Screenplay by	

Production staff

Year	Show	Role	Notes
1996	The Jeff Foxworthy Show	Co-producer	
1997	The Jeff Foxworthy Show	Co-producer	
1997	The Tony Danza Show	Producer	
1998	The Tony Danza Show	Producer	
2014	The Knick	Executive Producer, Co-creator	
2015	The Knick	Executive Producer, Co-creator	
2020	Perry Mason	Executive Producer, Co-Showrunner (Season 2)	

Writer

Year	Show	Season	Episode title	Episode	Notes
1994	Herman's Head	3	"The Herm from Ipanema"	17	
1995	Empty Nest	7	"The Ex-Files"	19	
1996	Minor Adjustments	1	"Ask Dr. Ron"	9	
1996	Minor Adjustments	1	"Baba-Doo-Wang"	14	
1996	The Jeff Foxworthy Show	2	"The Poor Sportsmen of the Apocalypse"	3	
1997	The Jeff Foxworthy Show	2	"Feud for Thought"	11	
1997	The Jeff Foxworthy Show	2	"Can't Teach an Old Dog New Tricks"	12	
1998	The Wonderful World of Disney	1	"Disneys Animal Kingdom: The First Adventure"	27	
1998	The Tony Danza Show	1	"C'gar Face"	6	
1998	The Tony Danza Show	1	"Vision Quest"	14	
2000	Malcolm in the Middle	1	"Lois vs. Evil"	9	
2002	Greetings from Tucson	1	"My Two Padres"	2	
2003	Greetings from Tucson	1	"Ball and Chain"	10	
2014	The Knick	1	"Method and Madness	1	
2014	The Knick	1	"Mr. Paris Shoes"	2	
2014	The Knick	1	"The Busy Flea"	3	
2014	The Knick	1	"Where's the Dignity"	4	
2014	The Knick	1	"Start Calling Me Dad"	6	
2014	The Knick	1	"Get the Rope"	7	
2014	The Knick	1	"Working Late a Lot"	8	
2014	The Knick	1	"Crutchfield"	10	
2015	The Knick	2	"Ten Knots"	1	
2015	The Knick	2	"You're No Rose"	2	
2015	The Knick	2	"The Best with the Best to Get the Best"	3	
2015	The Knick	2	"Wonderful Surprises"	4	
2015	The Knick	2	"Williams and Walker"	7	
2015	The Knick	2	"Do You Remember Moon Flower?"	9	
2015	The Knick	2	"This Is All We Are"	10	
2023	Perry Mason	2		1	
