= Knickerbocker Hospital =

Defunct New York City hospital

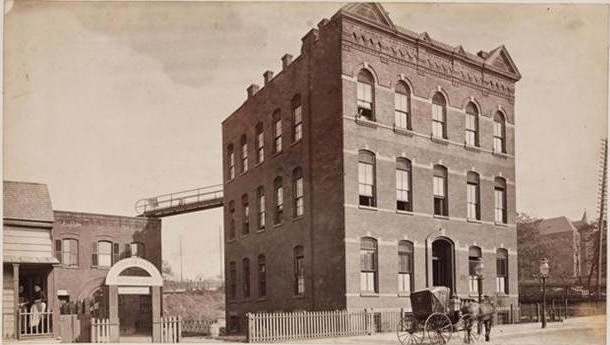
- The Hospital in 1886, known as J. Hood Wright Memorial Hospital at the time

Geography
- Location: New York City, New York, United States
- Coordinates: 40.815825°N 73.953000°W

Organization
- Type: General

Services
- Beds: 228

History
- Former names: Manhattan Dispensary (1862); Manhattan Hospital (1885); J. Hood Wright Memorial Hospital (1895); Knickerbocker Hospital (1913); Arthur C. Logan Memorial Hospital (1974)
- Opened: 1862
- Closed: 1979

Links
- Lists: Hospitals in New York State
- Other links: Hospitals in Manhattan

The Knickerbocker Hospital was a 228-bed hospital in New York City, located at 70 Convent Avenue, corner of West 131st Street in Harlem, serving primarily poor and immigrant patients.

== History ==
Founded in 1862 as the Manhattan Dispensary, it served as a temporary American Civil War tent facility for returning Union Army invalids. In 1885, the New York Times praised its rebirth as the fully equipped Manhattan Hospital, "the only general hospital north of Ninety-ninth street." The hospital assumed the city's largest ambulance district for many decades and worked at the forefront of treatments for polio, alcoholism, and gynecological care.

Manhattan Hospital's successive names were:

- the J. Hood Wright Memorial Hospital after James Hood Wright in 1895,
- the Knickerbocker Hospital in 1913,
- and finally, in 1974, as the Arthur C. Logan Memorial Hospital after Arthur C. Logan only a few years before it closed in 1979.

The 1914 Directory of Social and Health Agencies listed the hospital as such:

Knickerbocker Hospital (incorp. 1862 as the ManHattan Dispensary; Aug. 1895, title changed to J. Hood Wright Memorial; title again changed to present name, June, 1913, opened 1884), Amsterdam Ave. and 131st St. Gives free medical and surgical treatment to the worthy sick poor of New York City. Incurable and contagious diseases and alcoholic, maternity and insane patients not admitted. Emergency cases received at any hour. Capacity, 57 beds. 1,090 cases treated and 1,540 days' treatment given during the past year. Dispensary free to the poor only. Supported by charitable contributions. Visiting days, Tuesdays, Fridays and Sundays from 2 to 4 p.m.
Ambulance Service for the district from West 76th St. to 145th St. and from St. Nicholas Ave. to North River, including 28th, 32d and 36th Police Precincts.
Officers: Macomb G. Foster, Pres.; William H. Remick, Biv. 1. General Hospitals. 189
Treas.; Grant Squires, Ass't Treas.; Edward D. Jones, Sec.; Lucy M. Moore, Supt., to whom apply at hospital.

== Current status ==
The former Knickerbocker Hospital building still stands and is currently the M. Moran Weston seniors' residence.

== In popular culture ==
The television series The Knick is set in a hospital inspired by the Knickerbocker. The Knickerbocker, similar to the television portrayal, had a standing policy of often refusing to treat African-American patients despite the hospital's mission to serve those who could not afford to pay for medical care. The building was not used in the show's production, with the Boys High School building standing in for the hospital instead. In the television series, Clive Owen's character, Dr. John Thackery, is based in part on Dr. William Stewart Halsted. Dr. Halsted, a well-known physician who invented many new surgical instruments and techniques in the early 20th century, was, according to the Johns Hopkins Institute, known to be addicted to cocaine and morphine, like Thackery.

A fictional "Knickerbocker Hospital" is mentioned in season 24 episode 10 of Law & Order: Special Victims Unit.

== See also ==
- Doris L. Wethers, director of pediatrics at Knickerbocker Hospital from 1965 to 1973.
- William Stewart Halsted, physician and inventor.
