= Louie season 5 =

Louie
- Season 5
- DVD cover
- Starring: Louis C.K.
- No. of episodes: 8

Release
- Original network: FX
- Original release: April 9 – May 28, 2015

Season chronology
- ← Previous; Season 4

The fifth and final season of the American television comedy series Louie premiered on April 9, 2015, and concluded on May 28, 2015. It consists of eight episodes, each running approximately 23 minutes in length. FX broadcast the fifth season on Thursdays at 10:30 pm in the United States. The season was produced by 3 Arts Entertainment and the executive producers were Louis C.K., Dave Becky and M. Blair Breard.

Louie was created, written and directed by Louis C.K., who stars as a fictionalized version of himself, a comedian and divorced father raising his two daughters in New York City. The show has a loose format atypical for television comedy series, consisting of largely unconnected storylines and segments (described as "extended vignettes") that revolve around Louie's life, punctuated by live stand-up performances.

== Production ==
Louie was renewed by FX for a fifth season in July 2014 with a seven-episode order. When FX announced the season's premiere date in January 2015, it was announced the season would consist of eight episodes instead of thirteen or fourteen. It was later revealed by Louis C.K. during a panel to promote the show that the shortened season length was due to an unfortunate decision he made while high on marijuana. In January 2015, C.K. spoke about the writing and tone of the season, "This season is more laugh-centric and funny than season four. The feeling I was having when I wrote the season...was a goofy and playful feeling." The fifth season features the return of the opening credits and theme song, which were absent in the fourth season.

== Cast ==
=== Main cast ===
- Louis C.K. as Louie

=== Recurring cast ===
- Ursula Parker as Jane (5 episodes)
- Hadley Delany as Lilly (4 episodes)
- Pamela Adlon as Pamela (3 episodes)
- Robert Kelly as Bobby (3 episodes)

=== Guest stars ===
- Judy Gold as Marina ("Pot Luck")
- Celia Keenan-Bolger as Julianne ("Pot Luck")
- Jimmy Fallon as himself ("A La Carte")
- Steven Wright as Comic Strip MC ("A La Carte")
- Michael Rapaport as Lenny ("Cop Story")
- Todd Barry as Todd ("Untitled")
- Nick DiPaolo as Nick ("Untitled")
- Jon Glaser as Jon ("Untitled")
- Charles Grodin as Dr. Bigelow ("Untitled")
- Jim Norton as Jim ("Untitled")
- Matthew Broderick as man ("Sleepover")
- Michael Cera as Young Man ("Sleepover")
- Glenn Close as Woman ("Sleepover")
- John Lithgow as Funny Man ("Sleepover")
- Edward Gelbinovich as Doug ("The Road Part 1")
- Devin Ratray as Mike ("The Road Part 1")
- Jim Florentine as Kenny ("The Road Part 2")

== Episodes ==
| No. overall | No. in season | Title | Directed by | Written by | Original release date | Prod. code | U.S. viewers (millions) |
|---|---|---|---|---|---|---|---|
| 54 | 1 | "Pot Luck" | Louis C.K. | Louis C.K. | April 9, 2015 | XCK05001 | 0.63 |
Louie, feeling depressed, sees a therapist. Later, he goes to a potluck dinner, for parents whose children go to the same school. However, he first arrives at the wrong potluck in the same apartment building which is a gathering of New Age followers. After the potluck, he rides home with a pregnant woman, Julianne, who is a surrogate mother for a lesbian couple, one of which was the hostess of the potluck, Marina. Louie helps Julianne up to her apartment, and she later breaks down due to her pregnancy hormones and has sex with Louie, but her water breaks. Louie takes her to the hospital and is chastised by Marina who wanted an all-natural birth at a Brooklyn birthing center.
| 55 | 2 | "A La Carte" | Louis C.K. | Story by : Louis C.K. & Pamela Adlon; Teleplay by : Louis C.K. | April 16, 2015 | XCK05002 | 0.47 |
Louie is grocery shopping with his daughters when he suddenly needs to poop, but can't find a bathroom. Louie hosts an open mic night and is asked for feedback by an untalented young comedian with an unfunny, creepy routine. Later, Louie and Pamela see a French film and go to an Italian restaurant where Louie suggests they should move in together, but Pamela wants it to remain an open relationship though she does reluctantly say that she loves him. Meanwhile the comedian Louie has mentored has become very successful by following Louie's advice.
| 56 | 3 | "Cop Story" | Louis C.K. | Story by : Louis C.K & Robert Smigel; Teleplay by : Louis C.K. | April 23, 2015 | XCK05003 | 0.41 |
Louie goes shopping at a cookware store where the 24-year-old owner is rude to him because he's old and she doesn't need or want him to be a regular customer, though she also makes a valid point about how the younger generation being smarter is a good thing. He later runs into his sister's ex-boyfriend Lenny, an obnoxious and unsuccessful NYPD officer, and suffers through a miserable and harrowing evening of the guy's company.
| 57 | 4 | "Bobby's House" | Louis C.K. | Louis C.K. | April 30, 2015 | XCK05004 | 0.58 |
Louie gets stuck attending a wake for someone his brother Robbie wrongly thought was their uncle. Then he reluctantly visits Robbie's pathetic apartment and has to listen to his sibling whine about how bad his life is and how Louie won't offer him undefined "help". Then he stops a violent, crazy woman from attacking someone at a bus stop for no reason, only to end up receiving a brutal beating from her and being laughed at for it by his daughters and Pamela. Then Pamela gets Louie to enact a very bizarre sexual scenario, and when he once again broaches the couplehood subject, Pamela just breaks up with him. Then Louie cries, but his entire story does cheer Robbie up.
| 58 | 5 | "Untitled" | Louis C.K. | Louis C.K. | May 7, 2015 | XCK05005 | 0.37 |
Louie is tormented by nightmares involving a monstrous naked figure, a giant rabbit head, and his gibberish-spouting brother while dealing with issues in real life: Jane's strange medical issues and outcast status at school, Lily's attendance at a sleepover where the kids all watched the wildly age-inappropriate A Clockwork Orange, an annoying comedian (Jon Glaser) who loves his joke about beekeeping but can't even remember it accurately, and an encounter with the recently-divorced and very sad mom of Lily's friend. One of his comedian friends actually supplies some good advice, though, that leads Louie to take action and finally puts his mind at ease.
| 59 | 6 | "Sleepover" | Louis C.K. | Story by : Louis C.K. & Pamela Adlon; Teleplay by : Louis C.K. | May 14, 2015 | XCK05006 | 0.41 |
Louie takes Lily to a play starring Matthew Broderick, Glenn Close, John Lithgow, and Michael Cera and gets annoyed when she focuses on her phone instead of the deep emotional contents of the production, only to learn she was looking up information on the play. Louie apologizes for initially demanding she hand over the phone to him. He then gloomily prepares to host a sleepover for Jane and several of her friends, and when he learns the mom and dad of the first girl to arrive are heading towards a divorce, he tries to give good advice that completely fails. Jane and the girls demand a sundae station (he says no) and pizza (which he orders) before Louie gets a text from Pamela and ends up demanding both that she call him and start sexting, which she does even though she appears to be on a date, and he has to cut it short to handle the sleepover. After the pizza arrives, Louie gets a desperate phone call from Bobby saying he's in jail and needs bail money to avoid spending the night there. The girls are actually happy to head to the police station and their hijinks get a lazy cop to quickly process Bobby's bail. The group then hears Bobby's false story of why he was in jail, and everyone (including their cab driver) ends up enjoying dessert at an ice cream shop.
| 60 | 7 | "The Road Part 1" | Louis C.K. | Louis C.K. | May 21, 2015 | XCK05007 | 0.44 |
Louie goes on tour and is exasperated by annoyances on the road. His driver demands too much attention, his hotel accommodations are poor, and at the airport he contends with both a lost child and a lost carry-on bag. Eventually he meets an airport employee who helps him out.
| 61 | 8 | "The Road Part 2" | Louis C.K. | Story by : Louis C.K. & Steven Wright; Teleplay by : Louis C.K. | May 28, 2015 | XCK05008 | 0.51 |
Louie's unpleasant tour continues. He arrives in Oklahoma City and is taken to his guest apartment by the comedy club owner's airheaded and racist daughter. He finds he'll be sharing the space with a comic named Kenny. Kenny invites him to share some whiskey even though it's still morning, but Louie declines. Louie's first night at the club is difficult, with a demanding club owner and a poor reception from the audience. While taking a walk to get away from Kenny, Louie has a fun experience at a craft fair where some women persuade him to dress as a Civil War officer. That night at the club Kenny mocks Louie onstage and the next morning they have a heated discussion about their approaches to comedy. Eventually Louie comes around to Kenny's point of view and agrees to drink a bottle of whiskey with him. Unfortunately this ends with Louie retching in a toilet and Kenny sustaining a fatal head injury. The episode ends with Louie returning home and telling his daughter Jane a tall tale about the photograph of his ancestor, the Civil War general.

== Reception ==
=== Critical response ===
The fifth season of Louie has received acclaim from critics. On Rotten Tomatoes, the season has a rating of 92%, based on 38 reviews, with the site's critical consensus reading, "A renewed focus on the show's singular blend of sincerity and hilarity keep Louie at the top of its game." On Metacritic, the season has a score of 91 out of 100, based on 20 critics, indicating "universal acclaim".

Sonia Saraiya of Salon wrote that "Louie is a treasure" and that season 5 of the show "is as confident and distinctive as ever, a sitcom that is not quite like anything else on television". James Poniewozik of Time wrote that season 5 is "by and large, blisteringly funny" and "also poignant", stating that "Louie has again successfully reinvented itself, this time as what it used to be." Brian Lowry of Variety praised the series and wrote, "Almost nothing else on TV — certainly in half-hour form — rivals the particularity of C.K.'s approach, which has garnered the kind of well-deserved accolades that have kept FX quietly humming that 'Brother Louie' tune."

=== Accolades ===
For the 67th Primetime Emmy Awards, the series received nominations for Outstanding Comedy Series, Louis C.K. for Outstanding Lead Actor in a Comedy Series, and Pamela Adlon for Outstanding Guest Actress in a Comedy Series. C.K. also received nominations for Outstanding Writing for a Comedy Series for "Bobby's House" and Outstanding Directing for a Comedy Series for "Sleepover". For the 22nd Screen Actors Guild Awards, Louie C.K. was nominated for Best Comedy Actor. For the 68th Directors Guild of America Awards, Louis C.K. was nominated for Outstanding Directing – Comedy Series for "Sleepover".
