= Pot Luck (Louie) =

- Louie episode
- Episode no.: Season 5 Episode 1
- Directed by: Louis C.K.
- Written by: Louis C.K.
- Cinematography by: Paul Koestner
- Editing by: Louis C.K.
- Production code: XCK05001
- Original release date: April 9, 2015
- Running time: 23 minutes

Guest appearances
- Judy Gold as Marina; Celia Keenan-Bolger as Julianne

Episode chronology
| ← Previous "Pamela Part 3" | Next → "A La Carte" |
- Louie (season 5)

"Pot Luck" is the first episode of the fifth season of the American comedy-drama television series Louie. It is the 54th overall episode of the series and was written and directed by Louis C.K., who also serves as the lead actor. It was released on FX on April 9, 2015.

The series follows Louie, a fictionalized version of C.K., a comedian and newly divorced father raising his two daughters in New York City. In the episode, Louie decides to attend a potluck dinner when he believes himself to be boring.

According to Nielsen Media Research, the episode was seen by an estimated 0.63 million household viewers and gained a 0.3 ratings share among adults aged 18–49. The episode received positive reviews, who praised the return to form after the ambitious structure of the previous season.

== Plot ==
At the Comedy Cellar, Louie (Louis C.K.) talks about extraterrestrial life, explaining that he is indifferent to life on other planets.

Louie sees a therapist about his depression but he's so boring in the session that the shrink falls asleep while he's talking. Trying to change his lifestyle, he calls Marina (Judy Gold), a parent at school who doesn't like him, if he can attend a potluck dinner she is hosting. She reluctantly says he can and even more reluctantly tells him he can bring some fried chicken. At the dinner, Louie tries to socialize more, until he discovers that he is actually at a New Age gathering. He goes to the real dinner, but finds himself shunned out of conversations by Marina, prompting him to leave.

As he waits for a taxi, Louie is joined by Julianne (Celia Keenan-Bolger), a surrogate mother for Marina and her wife. He accompanies her to her apartment, where she breaks down due to her pregnancy hormones and being treated like nothing by everyone. When Louie tells her she's beautiful, she is moved to tears and then asks Louie to have sex with her. He agrees to, but while they're copulating her water breaks. He takes her to a nearby hospital where she gives birth, and Marina rages at him for ruining her plan for an unconventional birth center delivery, but Louie giggles at the whole absurd situation before telling Marina to chill out and walking away from her verbal abuse with a big smile on his face.

== Production ==
=== Development ===
In March 2015, FX confirmed that the first episode of the season would be titled "Pot Luck", and that it would be written and directed by series creator and lead actor Louis C.K. This was C.K.'s 54th writing and directing credit.

== Reception ==
=== Viewers ===
In its original American broadcast, "Pot Luck" was seen by an estimated 0.63 million household viewers with a 0.3 in the 18-49 demographics. This means that 0.3 percent of all households with televisions watched the episode. This was a 12% increase in viewership with the previous episode, which was watched by 0.56 million viewers with a 0.3 in the 18-49 demographics.

=== Critical reviews ===
"Pot Luck" received positive reviews from critics. Matt Fowler of IGN gave the episode a "great" 8 out of 10 and wrote in his verdict, "A simple, somewhat back-to-basics Louie episode -- filled with fierce fumblings but devoid of actual consequences -- kicked off Season 5 with an enjoyable look at how Louie goes about attending a party that neither he, nor the people hosting, want him to attend."

Alan Sepinwall of HitFix wrote, "A funny yet melancholy start to the new season, and I liked the device of the banjo player linking the different scenes together." Brandon Nowalk of The A.V. Club gave the episode a "B–" grade and wrote, "What was once an adventure in discontinuity is now a fairly conventional semi-serial, in narrative terms anyway. So how do the man and the character respond to this opening concern? If 'Pot Luck' is anything to go by, Louie the character is taking that epiphany to heart, enduring endless humiliations in the name of actually trying. Louie the show, on the other hand, couldn't care less about changing its ways. If you thought it was boring before, wait till you see 'Pot Luck.'"

Danielle Henderson of Vulture gave the episode a 4 star rating out of 5 and wrote, "Considering what happens at the end of the episode, it's entirely possible that he’s daring himself to find new ways to shake things up, which includes going to a potluck, inadvertently ruining a celestial event, and demolishing a couple's birth plan in the span of a few hours." Randy Dankievitch of TV Overmind wrote, "Ever the master of his craft, Louie C.K. continues to find new ways to confuse, amaze, and frustrate us (and by proxy, challenge us) as human beings, something 'Potluck' does a bit more subtly than future episodes in this fifth season. Yet there still isn't a dull moment to be had on Louie, a visually arresting canvas of existential pontification that only grows more interesting and singular with each passing season."

Joe Matar of Den of Geek gave the episode a 3 rating out of 5 and wrote, "Unlike the majority of season four, 'Potluck' is happy to return to this formula, so while it's a functional episode of Louie, it doesn't do anything to surprise, which is the key attraction of this show." Paste gave the episode a 4.5 out of 10 and wrote, "Stylistically, I loved Louie as ever. The show has never missed a beat when it comes to its direction and acting, not to mention the gorgeous cinematography around New York. For all the shows out there now, there's still somehow nothing else that looks like it on television. There was almost nothing else to recommend this episode, though, which for the most part gave us limp, problematic takes on depression, surrogates, and lesbians with a complete lack of grace, intelligence, or even simply new observations. It was bad."
