= Method and Madness =

- The Knick episode
- Episode no.: Season 1 Episode 1
- Directed by: Steven Soderbergh
- Written by: Jack Amiel; Michael Begler
- Cinematography by: Peter Andrews (Note: Pseudonym for Steven Soderbergh.)
- Editing by: Mary Ann Bernard
- Original release date: August 8, 2014
- Running time: 56 minutes

Guest appearances
- Melissa Errico as Catherine Christiansen; Collin Meath as Phineas "Phinny" Sears; Lucas Papaelias as Eldon Pouncey; Frank Wood as Mr. Havershorn; Michael Berresse as Parke-Davis Representative; Karl Bury as Mr. Corker; Louis Butelli as Mr. Gentile; Christopher Dalbey as Bleier Driver; Kate Easton as Mrs. Warren; Caitlin Johnston as Nurse Monk; Lucy Jurevics as Yetta Krawetz; Ying Ying Li as Lin-Lin; Caitlin McDonough-Thayer as Miss Telfer; Richard James Porter as Monsignor Joseph Mills Lawlor; Martins Straupe as Mr. Krawetz; Monty Stuart as Pete; Aija Tērauda as Mrs. Krawetz; Zenon Zeleniuch as Slum Landlord

Episode chronology
← Previous —	Next → "Mr. Paris Shoes"

"Method and Madness" is the series premiere of the American medical period drama television series The Knick. The episode was written by series creators Jack Amiel and Michael Begler, and directed by executive producer Steven Soderbergh. It originally aired on Cinemax on August 8, 2014.

The series is set in New York City in the early twentieth century and follows the staff of the Knickerbocker Hospital (the Knick), who struggle against the limitations of medical understanding and practice. The protagonist is Dr. John Thackery, the new leader of the surgery staff, who balances his cocaine and opium addictions against his ambition for medical discovery and his reputation among his peers.

According to Nielsen Media Research, the episode was seen by an estimated 0.354 million household viewers, which grew to 1.7 million when accounting for multiple viewings across Cinemax and HBO. The episode received extremely positive reviews from critics, who praised Soderbergh's directing, performances, score, and production values. At the 67th Primetime Emmy Awards, Steven Soderbergh received a nomination for Outstanding Directing for a Drama Series.

== Plot ==
In New York City in 1900, Dr. John Thackery (Clive Owen) leaves a brothel in the early hours to return to work at the Knickerbocker Hospital (the Knick). He and his partner, Dr. J. M. Christiansen (Matt Frewer), perform a surgery on a pregnant woman with the help of their staff, deeming it a case of placenta praevia. They take the fetus out but fail in saving it and the woman, despite their efforts. Thackery claims that the failure was not Christiansen's fault, but rather the procedure itself. Christiansen later goes to his office, where he shoots himself in the head.

At Christiansen's funeral, Thackery delivers a eulogy. He then attends a meeting with the Knicks' board of directors, as he is now the head of the surgery staff. He wants to recommend Dr. Everett Gallinger (Eric Johnson) as the new deputy, but the hospital's benefactor, Cornelia Robertson (Juliet Rylance), asks him to hire Dr. Algernon C. Edwards in the position, as he is familiar with techniques employed in Europe. Thackery is forced to accept it because Robertson's family is important to the hospital. During a showcase of Gallinger's methods, Thackery discovers that a new nurse, Lucy Elkins (Eve Hewson), incorrectly placed a tube for a patient and reprimands her.

Edwards (André Holland) meets Thackery, but the latter is dismayed to discover that he is African-American. Unwilling to place one in his medical staff, he informs Cornelia that he will not hire him, causing the Robertsons to pull back on electricity. When the patient is diagnosed with sepsis, Gallinger states that they need Thackery for surgery and gets Elkins to find Thackery at his house. She finds him suffering from cocaine withdrawal and is told that she must inject him with cocaine. As most of his veins have collapsed, she is forced to inject him in his urethra.

Thackery returns to the Knick to take on the operation. As the patient has developed bronchitis, they cannot use anesthesia on him. Instead, Thackery performs a spinal block with cocaine, which allows him to repair the bowel using a revolutionary clamp of his own design. Impressed, Edwards, who planned to quit following the surgery due to Thackery's treatment, decides to stay until he learns everything from him. As Thackery leaves for Chinatown, the lights return in the Knick.

== Production ==
=== Development ===
In July 2014, Cinemax announced that the first episode of the season would be titled "Method and Madness", and that it would be written by series creators Jack Amiel and Michael Begler, and directed by executive producer Steven Soderbergh.

== Reception ==
=== Viewers ===
In its original American broadcast, "Method and Madness" was seen by an estimated 0.354 million household viewers. The episode also aired on HBO the following day, with 0.533 million viewers watching. Across both channels and multiple airings, the episode was watched by 1.7 million viewers.

=== Critical reviews ===
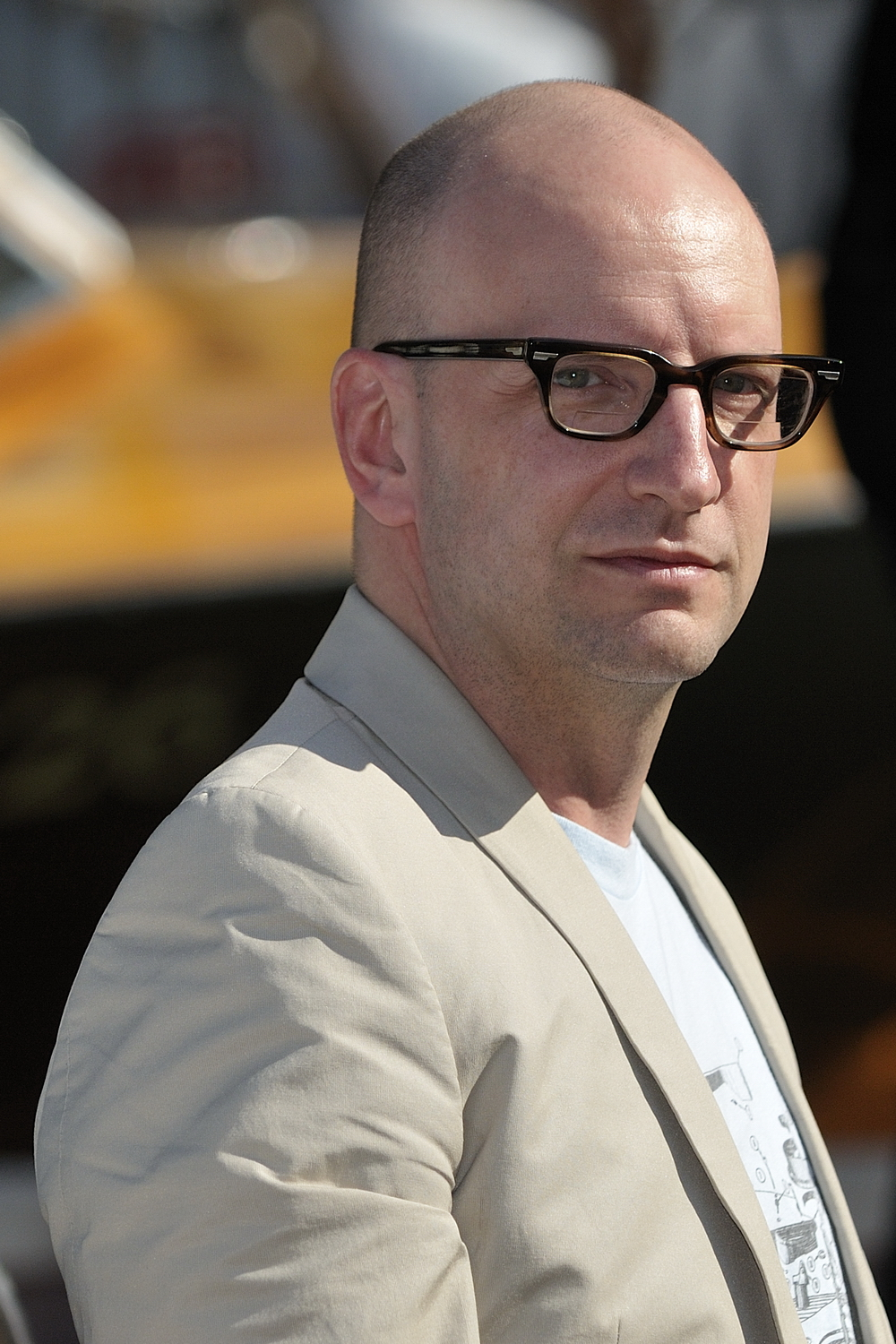
Steven Soderbergh's directing was praised by critics. He would receive a nomination for Outstanding Directing for a Drama Series for the episode.

"Method and Madness" received extremely positive reviews from critics. The review aggregator website Rotten Tomatoes reported an 90% approval rating for the episode, based on 10 reviews. The site's consensus states: "Thanks largely to Steven Soderbergh's confident directorial hand, The Knick's series premiere is a polished piece of period entertainment, even if it isn't groundbreaking television."

Matt Fowler of IGN gave the episode a "great" 8 out of 10 and wrote in his verdict, "With Soderbergh at the wheel, The Knick is gorgeously crafted. And while it's not a mini/anthology series like Fargo or True Detective, it keeps up the new tradition of 'same director/same writer' for each episode. Soderbergh directs every chapter, while creators Jack Amiel and Michael Begler write each one. It's a new creative method that I'm extremely fond of. The Knick can be cold and shivery at times - putting a world on display that contains ample amounts of misery, hardship, and corruption. No one stands out as an investable, sympathetic character (yet), though some doctors and staff members do care more about the patients than others. The biggest draw so far are the actual medical breakthroughs, though if the series doesn't expand beyond that soon, it could grow tiresome."

Brandon Nowalk of The A.V. Club gave the episode an "A–" grade and wrote, "The details don't bog down The Knick. They bring the hustle and bustle of the neighborhood to life. The world is faster than ever. New York is the second biggest city in the world. Life expectancy is more than 47 if you can believe it. Thackery, like Christianson before him, sees the endless possibility of the time and wants some of that glory for himself. He's driven by ambition, haunted by addiction, devoted to technological progress and blind to social justice. At the end he slinks back to the Chinatown brothel he came from as the lights come on in the hospital. The Knick is just getting started."

Debbie Day of Entertainment Weekly wrote, "The show is an exploration of the depth of Thackery's addictions as rendered in startlingly original fashion by Oscar-winning director Steven Soderbergh and composer Cliff Martinez, who laces the adventure with a driving '80s-throwback electro-funk score." Keith Uhlich of Vulture gave the episode a 4 star rating out of 5 and wrote, "You'll probably know where you stand with The Knick after this early sequence. It typifies the antiseptic visual approach Soderbergh has honed since Traffic, when he fully dispensed with outside DPs and became his own cinematographer. Many filmmakers would milk the moment when the pregnant patient begs, 'Please save my baby,' before being put under. Soderbergh presents it as a mere statistic no more or less important than graphic incisions, claret-filled jars, or a dead infant."

Mike Hale of The New York Times wrote, "The premiere episode of The Knick, the new Cinemax series directed by Steven Soderbergh, was bracketed by scenes in a hospital operating theater where perilous surgeries took their agonizing course. The first, a Caesarean section, was a disaster, killing both mother and child; the last, a bowel resection, was a surprising success. There's your Episode 1 narrative arc, from despair to hope in 50 minutes." Steve MacFarlane of Slant Magazine wrote, "Soderbergh's passion is for the stuff that fell through the cracks, details too lurid, contradictory, or, in many cases, un-Christian to survive in history books. With The Knick, his aim seems to be a recreation of the accompanying environment in total, with as little in-retrospect judgment on the characters as the medium allows. By attempting this level of filth-smocked termite-art verisimilitude while also doling out the customary hour's worth of primetime melodrama, the jump-off is fierce, and nerve-wracking for its high-wire ambition."

Michael Noble of Den of Geek wrote, "It's an essential component that, coupled with stomach-churning foley work reminds us of the squelchy, confusing mess in which Thackery plies his trade. It's not a job for everyone, but we can all be glad that it was a job for someone." Robert Ham of Paste gave the episode a 9.6 out of 10 and wrote, "The Knick is uniquely engrossing television, dropping you in the heart of New York City circa 1900, but giving you little time to gawk at the strict attention to detail. You're quickly swept up into this intense and impressive plot, following each step of each character, with deep interest and curiosity. You're in the assured hands of some of the best storytellers in the business. Trust in them, and you'll have much to applaud at the end of this first hour."

=== Accolades ===
For the episode, Steven Soderbergh received a nomination for Outstanding Directing for a Drama Series at the 67th Primetime Emmy Awards. He would lose the award to Game of Thrones for the episode, "Mother's Mercy".
