= Cop Story (Louie) =

- Louie episode
- Episode no.: Season 5 Episode 3
- Directed by: Louis C.K.
- Story by: Louis C.K.; Robert Smigel
- Teleplay by: Louis C.K.
- Cinematography by: Paul Koestner
- Editing by: Louis C.K.
- Production code: XCK05003
- Original air date: April 23, 2015
- Running time: 24 minutes

Guest appearance
- Michael Rapaport as Lenny

Episode chronology
← Previous "A La Carte"	Next → "Bobby's House"
- Louie (season 5)

"Cop Story" is the third episode of the fifth season of the American comedy-drama television series Louie. It is the 56th overall episode of the series and was written and directed by Louis C.K., who also serves as the lead actor, with Robert Smigel receiving a co-story credit. It was released on FX on April 23, 2015.

The series follows Louie, a fictionalized version of C.K., a comedian and newly divorced father raising his two daughters in New York City. In the episode, Louie runs into an old friend, a police officer, although his obnoxious personality annoys him.

According to Nielsen Media Research, the episode was seen by an estimated 0.41 million household viewers and gained a 0.2 ratings share among adults aged 18–49. The episode received mostly positive reviews from critics, with Michael Rapaport receiving praise for his performance.

== Plot ==
At a cookware store, Louie (Louis C.K.) is unable to get copper pots, as the owner (Clara Wong) refuses to open the case as it is nearing the closing time. When he confronts her, she replies with rude remarks towards him. She then reiterates that he fears feeling left behind by the new generation, something he admits.

While walking on the street, Louie is stopped by an old friend, a police officer named Lenny (Michael Rapaport). Lenny is his sister's ex-boyfriend and often displays acts of immaturity while wearing the uniform. He invites Louie to a New York Knicks game, which he reluctantly accepts. When Lenny is denied access through a private gate, they decide to go to a bar to watch the game. At the bar, Lenny laments his situation but Louie is upset with the way Lenny treats him and leaves. He comes clean to Lenny, telling him his attitude is the reason why people evade him.

As Louie and Lenny argue, Lenny discovers that he lost his gun. Failing to find it at the bar and Louie's house, Lenny breaks down, as he fears being fired. Louie decides to trace back their route, eventually finding the gun in the street. He hides it from the public, even avoiding getting caught by NYPD officers. He returns to the apartment with the gun, prompting a relieved Lenny to hug him.

== Production ==
=== Development ===
In March 2015, FX confirmed that the third episode of the season would be titled "Cop Story", and that it would be written and directed by series creator and lead actor Louis C.K., with Robert Smigel receiving a co-story credit. This was C.K.'s 56th writing and directing credit, and Smigel's first writing credit.

== Reception ==
=== Viewers ===
In its original American broadcast, "Cop Story" was seen by an estimated 0.41 million household viewers with a 0.2 in the 18-49 demographics. This means that 0.2 percent of all households with televisions watched the episode. This was a 13% decrease in viewership with the previous episode, which was watched by 0.47 million viewers with a 0.2 in the 18-49 demographics.

=== Critical reviews ===
"Cop Story" received mostly positive reviews from critics. Matt Fowler of IGN gave the episode a "great" 8.4 out of 10 and wrote in his verdict, "Like the previous two Season 5 episodes, this was a very straightforward story. Michael Rapaport did a fine job of portraying a guy who you wanted Louie to get far away from, despite the fact that he eventually showcased a lot of pain and vulnerability. Fitting for the Lenny character, Rapaport basically dominated this episode until Louie had to quietly, but heroically, save him at the end."

Alan Sepinwall of HitFix wrote, "'Cop Story' was much more dramatic and uncomfortable than the last few episodes have been. It was also terrific." Brandon Nowalk of The A.V. Club gave the episode a "B" grade and wrote, "'Cop Story' doesn't hit very hard. Considering it's about an obnoxious sad sack cop with no loved ones who sometimes considers killing himself, it sure is nimble. It doesn't dwell on anything, least of all what it means to return a gun to a man who only realized he lost it because he was going to demonstrate his suicidal fantasy."

Danielle Henderson of Vulture gave the episode a perfect 5 star rating out of 5 and wrote, "If you pull back from this episode a little bit, it's an interesting mix, from start to finish, of how we perform masculinity. It's also about incredibly annoying people, and the bullshit we have to put up with when they swoop in and piss all over our lives." Randy Dankievitch of TV Overmind wrote, "Even though the episode lacks any sort of stand-up segment, this is as signature a Louie episode as they get, another memorable entry into Louie's increasingly impressive catalog."

Joe Matar of Den of Geek gave the episode a 4.5 rating out of 5 and wrote, "this is another solid episode for what's shaping up to be an awesome season." Paste gave the episode a 5.4 out of 10 and wrote, "'Cop Story' is a reminder that when Louie goes didactic, when it wants to tell us a message with its stories, it's always bad. Tonally, the show feels like it's talking down to children, and that's just not an enjoyable thing to be on the other side of. Instead of affecting, I find this type of writing irritating, and unfortunately Louie keeps heading back to this well with more and more frequency."
