= The Road (Louie) =

- Louie episodes
- Episode nos.: Season 5 Episodes 7 & 8
- Directed by: Louis C.K.
- Story by: Louis C.K. (Part 1 & 2); Steven Wright (Part 2)
- Teleplay by: Louis C.K.
- Cinematography by: Paul Koestner
- Editing by: Louis C.K.
- Production codes: XCK05007; XCK05008
- Original air dates: May 21, 2015 (Part 1); May 28, 2015 (Part 2)
- Running time: 50 minutes

Guest appearances
- Part 1: Devin Ratray as Mike; Part 2: Ursula Parker as Jane; Jim Florentine as Kenny; Zandi Holup as April

Episode chronology
← Previous "Sleepover"	Next → —
- Louie (season 5)

"The Road" is the seventh and eighth episode and season finale of the fifth season of the American comedy-drama television series Louie. It is the 60th and 61st overall episode of the series and was written and directed by Louis C.K., who also serves as the lead actor, with producer Steven Wright receiving a story credit for "Part 2". It was released on FX, with "Part 1" airing on May 21, 2015, and "Part 2" airing on May 28, 2015.

The series follows Louie, a fictionalized version of C.K., a comedian and newly divorced father raising his two daughters in New York City. In the episodes, Louie goes on a comedy tour, facing many problems along the way.

According to Nielsen Media Research, "Part 1" was seen by an estimated 0.44 million household viewers and gained a 0.2 ratings share among adults aged 18–49, while "Part 2" was seen by an estimated 0.51 million household viewers and gained a 0.2 ratings share among adults aged 18–49. The episodes received extremely positive reviews from critics, who praised the performances, writing and tone.

In August 2015, C.K. stated that the series would go on an "extended hiatus." However, FX ended their business partnership with C.K. in November 2017, after he confirmed that a series of sexual misconduct allegations against him were true. This made the episode the series finale.

== Plot ==
=== Part 1 ===
As part of a tour, Louie (Louis C.K.) arrives at his first stop, Cincinnati. He is picked up by a chauffeur, Mike (Devin Ratray), who wants to establish a friendship with Louie. Louie arrives at his rest stop, which is a poorly managed motel, so he reprimands Doug for not picking a better place to stay.

Mike arrives two hours earlier and tries to build a conversation with Louie. Louie bluntly tells him that he prefers not talking, which disappoints Mike. After performing in Atlanta, Louie prepares to board a flight to Charlotte, North Carolina but discovers that he accidentally lost his luggage. After barely getting through security, he finally manages to arrive at his next flight in time.

=== Part 2 ===
Louie arrives at Oklahoma City, where he is picked up by April, a comedy club owner who booked Louie for several performances. As she drives him to his guest apartment, Louie is disgusted by her stupidity and racist personality. She takes him to a condo, which he must share with a comic named Kenny (Jim Florentine). During their first performance, Kenny is well received by the audience, while Louie struggles in catching their interest. The club owner is hostile to Louie right away, first demanding that he wear a suit for his performance (though he backs off when Louie bluntly says he's going to dress his usual way and the owner can fire him if that's a deal breaker) and later moving Louie to less prominent timeslots, ominously saying Louie SHOULD be concerned about his demotion when Louie says he doesn't care about the changes.

As he walks in the street, Louie goes through a craft fair. Two women convince him to try on a Civil War uniform, after which they take a picture. He later goes to the comedy club, where he sees Kenny mock him on stage while the audience laughs. He confronts Kenny at the condo the next morning, where Kenny accuses Louie of deeming him inferior just for his types of jokes. They reconcile after drinking whiskey, although Louie ends up vomiting in the bathroom. Kenny tries to defecate in the upper tank of the toilet to gross Louie out, but he slips and slams head-first into the floor. Louie rushes him to the hospital, but Kenny has suffered a severe brain injury and ultimately dies. The club owner blames Louie and pledges he will never hire him again, but Louie just shrugs him and April off and leaves so he can drive back home. Back in NYC, Jane (Ursula Parker) asks about the picture. Louie claims that it was an ancestor of his who served in the Civil War and makes up a story for him.

== Production ==
=== Development ===
In April 2015, FX confirmed that the seventh and eighth episode of the season would be titled "The Road", and that it would be written and directed by series creator and lead actor Louis C.K., with producer Steven Wright receiving a story credit for "Part 2". This was C.K.'s 60th and 61st writing and directing credit, and Wright's first writing credit.

== Reception ==
=== Viewers ===
==== Part 1 ====
In its original American broadcast, "The Road Part 1" was seen by an estimated 0.44 million household viewers with a 0.2 in the 18-49 demographics. This means that 0.2 percent of all households with televisions watched the episode. This was a slight increase in viewership with the previous episode, which was watched by 0.41 million viewers with a 0.2 in the 18-49 demographics.

==== Part 2 ====
In its original American broadcast, "The Road Part 2" was seen by an estimated 0.51 million household viewers with a 0.2 in the 18-49 demographics. This means that 0.2 percent of all households with televisions watched the episode. This was a 15% increase in viewership with the previous episode, which was watched by 0.44 million viewers with a 0.2 in the 18-49 demographics.

=== Critical reviews ===
==== Part 1 ====
"The Road Part 1" received mostly positive reviews from critics. Matt Fowler of IGN gave the episode a "great" 8 out of 10 and wrote in his verdict, "Louie took to the road this week for a funny, though fairly benign, episode about the seemingly unending hardships one faces when joy is no longer derived from the "adventure" of travel. Louie's misfortune was either brought about because he was closed off and wouldn't put himself out there or because he was the only person in a certain situation who did care about something. Like with the child on the Tram."

Alan Sepinwall of HitFix wrote, "Fun, wistful stuff that may tie in thematically to whatever we get in Part 2, but that functioned just fine in the interim." Brandon Nowalk of The A.V. Club gave the episode an "A–" grade and wrote, "Sometimes Louie gets bleak by following a monologue off to some inescapable fact of life. 'The Road Pt. 1' is bleak from its name through to its bones. Louie's going on the road, first to Cincinnati and then to Charlotte, but we only get the Cincinnati leg this week. Nothing much happens. That's part of it. There isn't one exciting moment but instead a morass of little frustrations, and even those don't stand out much."

Danielle Henderson of Vulture gave the episode a 3 star rating out of 5 and wrote, "The best part of the episode was how happy Louie looked as he got his own personal chauffeur to the plane. Unlike his experience with Mike, this was a story, a dumb road story that happened only to him, so the interruption of his private time was welcome in trade for the resulting comedy of the absurd." Randy Dankievitch of TV Overmind wrote, "Regardless of its lack of dramatic thrust, the opening chapter of 'The Road' still makes for an intriguing watch, if only to try and suss out the important threads next week's season finale may touch on."

Joe Matar of Den of Geek gave the episode a 3 rating out of 5 and wrote, "'The Road' is a gentle episode that does a good job of highlighting the mundanity of what one might think is a super-fun-all-time profession. I doubt the second part is going to throw any major curveballs and will just be a continuation of Louie's tour and all the little things that happen (or don't) on it. But, then again, I could be wrong. This is Louie after all." Shane Ryan of Paste gave the episode an 8 out of 10 and wrote in his verdict, "The episode ends as it begins, with Louie counting off his shirts and underwear for each day as he places them in his suitcase. This time, though, they're newly bought, and so the cycle continues, day by agonizing day, as the comedian plies his craft in a country that he's long since forgotten how to love, and can only learn new ways to despise, as he crosses its monotonous expanse."

==== Part 2 ====
"The Road Part 2" received critical acclaim. Matt Fowler of IGN gave the episode an "amazing" 9.3 out of 10 and wrote in his verdict, "Louie ended Season 5 on a strong, surreal note with an episode filled with laughs, shocks, and a healthy, hilarious conversation about the validity of fart jokes."

Alan Sepinwall of HitFix wrote, "Season 5 has a lot of isolated episodes and storylines – some wickedly funny, some sad, some both at once – even as it draws this larger picture of where Louie is at this moment in his life. I would have loved an additional five episodes, but this was awfully satisfying." Brandon Nowalk of The A.V. Club gave the episode an "A–" grade and wrote, "'The Road Pt. 2' isn't an endless fog like 'Pt. 1.' There's rising action, a strong climax, and life-and-death consequences in Louie and Kenny's relationship. And where the brief detours at the airport contained some muted absurdities, Louie comes to life wandering around Oklahoma."

Danielle Henderson of Vulture gave the episode a 4 star rating out of 5 and wrote, "By the time 'The Road Part 2' begins, it's well established that Louis C.K. is a man under siege. In the fifth season of the series, we've seen Louie at war with his body, his mind, his children, his girlfriend, his job, strangers, acquaintances, and the Midwest at large. But if there's a skirmish that's been revisited more than any other this season, it's the battle over what it is to be a man." Randy Dankievitch of TV Overmind wrote, "I'll continue to be fascinated by the subtle touches of C.K., those that come to the surface in the climatic moments of 'The Road, Part 2,' then fade into the background, closing on the serene image of Louie telling his daughter a tall tale about the story of the man in the old-timey picture hanging on the kitchen fridge. Never change, Louie."

Joe Matar of Den of Geek gave the episode a 3.5 rating out of 5 and wrote, "'The Road' is a unique enough glimpse into the sad and awkward mundanity in the life of a comedian (or the life of this comedian, at any rate). Not a spectacularly strong finale, but far from a terrible one and a decent capper to an overall fun, clever, and tight little season." Shane Ryan of Paste gave the episode a 7.1 out of 10 and wrote in his verdict, "truth is truth — this was a lackluster finale, and the formula became formulaic. If it's true that artistic genius can only imitate itself, Louie will be constantly compelled to match its own high standard. In this case, it was a pale imitation at best."
