= The Busy Flea =

- The Knick episode
- Episode no.: Season 1 Episode 3
- Directed by: Steven Soderbergh
- Written by: Jack Amiel; Michael Begler
- Cinematography by: Peter Andrews (Note: Pseudonym for Steven Soderbergh.)
- Editing by: Mary Ann Bernard
- Original release date: August 22, 2014
- Running time: 55 minutes

Guest appearances
- Emily Bergl as Mrs. Hemming; La Tonya Borsay as Evaline Edwards; Jennifer Ferrin as Abigail Alford; Danny Hoch as Bunky Collier; Rachel Korine as Junia; Molly Price as Effie Barrow; Happy Anderson as Mr. James "Jimmy" Fester; Ylfa Edelstein as Nurse Baker; Antwayn Hopper as Woodson; Collin Meath as Phinny Sears; Adam Mucci as Dietz; Andy Murray as Clarence Mulkeen; Suzanne Savoy as Victoria Robertson; Ito Aghayere as Woman in Bar; Dominique Fishback as Woman; Craig "muMs" Grant as Hernia Patient; Allison Guinn as Nurse; Bonita Hamilton as Mrs. Gamble; Brian Tyree Henry as Larkin; Robert Michael Hugel as Mr. Gatchell; Aaron Joshua as Bar Patron; Kyle Knauf as Mr. Zincone; Ghana Leigh as Miss Odom; Victoria Leigh as Cora Hemming; Leopold Manswell as Hiram; James Joseph O'Neil as Dr. Grindin; Zuzanna Szadkowski as Nurse Pell; Jessica Keenan Wynn as Sister Theresa

Episode chronology
← Previous "Mr. Paris Shoes"	Next → "Where's the Dignity?"

"The Busy Flea" is the third episode of the American medical period drama television series The Knick. The episode was written by series creators Jack Amiel and Michael Begler, and directed by executive producer Steven Soderbergh. It originally aired on Cinemax on August 22, 2014.

The series is set in New York City in the early twentieth century and follows the staff of the Knickerbocker Hospital (the Knick), who struggle against the limitations of medical understanding and practice. The protagonist is Dr. John Thackery, the new leader of the surgery staff, who balances his cocaine and opium addictions against his ambition for medical discovery and his reputation among his peers. In the episode, Thackery is visited by a former lover. Meanwhile, Edwards faces a problem in his clinic, while Barrow tries to find a way out of his debt.

According to Nielsen Media Research, the episode was seen by an estimated 0.407 million household viewers and gained a 0.13 ratings share among adults aged 18–49. The episode received positive reviews from critics, who praised the performances and directing, although some criticized the pacing.

== Plot ==
A woman, Abigail Alford (Jennifer Ferrin) arrives at the Knick, surprising the staff with her nose cover. She meets with Thackery (Clive Owen), as they were previously in a relationship. Abigail reveals her nose, which was ravaged by syphilis from her promiscuous ex-husband. Thackery suggests a method through a skin graft surgery and assigns a doctor, but Abigail wants Thackery himself to do the operation.

Barrow (Jeremy Bobb) continues having trouble with his debt to Collier (Danny Hoch) as well as financial situations within his family. Desperate, he retrieves a corpse from the Knick and sells it in the black market to eventually settle his debt with Collier. With his cash, he celebrates with his mistress, a prostitute. Meanwhile, Sister Harriet (Cara Seymour) continues performing abortions, although Cleary (Chris Sullivan) claims that he is aware of her actions.

Cornelia (Juliet Rylance) is informed by August (Grainger Hines) that many socialites were diagnosed with typhoid, including a child whose father died of the same disease. She convinces Thackery to tackle the surgery, who performs it after performing the surgery on Abigail, saving the child's life.

Edwards (André Holland) is approached by Gallinger (Eric Johnson) and Chickering (Michael Angarano), who want their help in translating the French paper, which he co-authored. Edwards also faces problems in his clinic, when a patient with hernia returns after ignoring his instructions. Despite Edwards' best efforts, the patient dies during surgery. Distraught, he goes to a bar where he gets drunk. In his state, he picks a fight with a patron, winning the fight.

== Production ==
=== Development ===
In July 2014, Cinemax announced that the third episode of the season would be titled "The Busy Flea", and that it would be written by series creators Jack Amiel and Michael Begler, and directed by executive producer Steven Soderbergh. This was Amiel's third writing credit, Begler's third writing credit, and Soderbergh's third directing credit.

== Reception ==
=== Viewers ===
In its original American broadcast, "Mr. Paris Shoes" was seen by an estimated 0.407 million household viewers with a 0.13 in the 18-49 demographics. This means that 0.13 percent of all households with televisions watched the episode. This was a slight decrease in viewership from the previous episode, which was watched by an estimated 0.419 million household viewers with a 0.13 in the 18-49 demographics.

=== Critical reviews ===
"The Busy Flea" received positive reviews from critics. The review aggregator website Rotten Tomatoes reported an 90% approval rating for the episode, based on 10 reviews. The site's consensus states: "The Knick continues to display its mastery of tone with 'The Busy Flea,' a compelling third outing full of striking performances and Soderbergh's slick style."

Matt Fowler of IGN gave the episode a "great" 8.5 out of 10 and wrote in his verdict, "With tone and vibe to spare as usual, The Knick continues to impress as Dr. Edwards' banishment to the basement is finally beginning to wear thin on his nerves. He thought he'd found a remedy for his surgical desires, but one dead patient, this soon in his endeavors, proved to be too much for him. And whereas last week Edwards was bullied by a man because his shoes were from France, this week Edwards himself picked a fight with a guy simply because the man hadn't traveled very far in his life. And yes, that first-person-shooter style of filming the fight gave it all a fuzzy, scuzzy feel."

Brandon Nowalk of The A.V. Club gave the episode a "B–" grade and wrote, "The Knick is nothing if not a chart of the processes, micro and macro, that make up this hospital. So file that data on nurse wages somewhere. And 'The Busy Flea' in particular is about connecting the classes. But the show really comes alive when it visualizes those processes."

Debbie Day of Entertainment Weekly wrote, "A villain is slowly being introduced to the world of The Knick: As typhoid fever makes the rounds, Cornelia Robertson calls it out as a matter of real concern. Not yet considered an epidemic—Inspector Speight has some investigating to do before we start applying labels—typhoid catches Cornelia's attention because while it usually lays waste to impoverished, incredibly unhygienic housing projects, it's begun to target affluent households throughout the city. As Speight notes, it 'jumps around' — like a flea. Could the disease be the titular vermin in 'The Busy Flea'?" Keith Uhlich of Vulture gave the episode a 3 star rating out of 5 and wrote, "It's a general truism, if not a concrete fact, that a new television series will fully reveal itself by its third episode. [...] There are plenty of exceptions to this let's-not-call-it-a-rule. But I think that the 'The Busy Flea,' the third episode of Cinemax's The Knick, quite conspicuously fits this pattern, thanks in large part to its fascinating opening and closing scenes."

Mike Hale of The New York Times wrote, "These scenes of the compassionate, arrogant Edwards's clandestine efforts continued to be the best and most interesting part of the show, benefiting from Mr. Holland's vibrant performance." Steve MacFarlane of Slant Magazine wrote, "The Knick remains one hell of a panoramic contraption, and Clive Owen's starring turn as Dr. John Thackery is one of the show's major draws."

Gerri Mahn of Den of Geek gave the episode a 4 star rating out of 5 and wrote, "Dear Soderbergh, I get this is supposed to be a type of delirium. Could you stop beating me about the head and neck with it?" Robert Ham of Paste gave the episode a 7.9 out of 10 and wrote, "We're only three episodes into this series, and there's enough beauty and darkness baked into even the most overwrought scenes to give the The Knick a mulligan this week. It's just going to take some subtler writing and commentary to help right the ship next Friday."
