= Untitled (Louie) =

- Louie episode
- Episode no.: Season 5 Episode 5
- Directed by: Louis C.K.
- Written by: Louis C.K.
- Cinematography by: Paul Koestner
- Editing by: Louis C.K.
- Production code: XCK05005
- Original air date: May 7, 2015
- Running time: 24 minutes

Guest appearances
- Hadley Delany as Lilly; Ursula Parker as Jane; Charles Grodin as Dr. Bigelow; Robert Kelly as Bobby; Rachel Bay Jones as Barbara; Nick Di Paolo as Nick; Jon Glaser as Jon; Todd Barry as Todd; Marina Franklin as Comedy Cellar MC; Jim Norton as Jim

Episode chronology
← Previous "Bobby's House"	Next → "Sleepover"
- Louie (season 5)

"Untitled" is the fifth episode of the fifth season of the American comedy-drama television series Louie. It is the 58th overall episode of the series and was written and directed by Louis C.K., who also serves as the lead actor. It was released on FX on May 7, 2015.

The series follows Louie, a fictionalized version of C.K., a comedian and newly divorced father raising his two daughters in New York City. In the episode, Louie experiences nightmares, as he loses perception of reality.

According to Nielsen Media Research, the episode was seen by an estimated 0.37 million household viewers and gained a 0.2 ratings share among adults aged 18–49. The episode received critical acclaim, with critics praising the episode's originality, surrealism and themes.

== Plot ==
Louie (Louis C.K.) takes Jane (Ursula Parker) to visit Dr. Bigelow (Charles Grodin), where she explains a bizarre scenario. Afterward, he picks up Lilly (Hadley Delany) from the nanny's house following a sleepover. However the nanny, Barbara (Rachel Bay Jones), breaks down due to her recent divorce, so Louie leaves with the girls after putting a blanket over the crying Barbara. Louie is upset upon discovering that Lilly watched A Clockwork Orange with her friends.

At night, Louie experiences a nightmare in which he is chased by a monstrous naked figure. He later goes to the Comedy Cellar, where he sees a comedian, Jon (Jon Glaser), stealing jokes from Louie's stand-up. Louie starts losing his perception of reality, as he finds himself in many bizarre scenarios. Bigelow only advises him on living with it, just as his fears increase with more recurring nightmares. When Nick (Nick Di Paolo) suggests going back to the origin of his fears, Louie visits Barbara and helps her in cleaning her house while also having sex with her. That night, Louie finally sleeps peacefully.

== Production ==
=== Development ===
In April 2015, FX confirmed that the fifth episode of the season would be titled "Untitled", and that it would be written and directed by series creator and lead actor Louis C.K.. This was C.K.'s 58th writing and directing credit.

== Reception ==
=== Viewers ===
In its original American broadcast, "Untitled" was seen by an estimated 0.37 million household viewers with a 0.2 in the 18-49 demographics. This means that 0.2 percent of all households with televisions watched the episode. This was a 37% decrease in viewership with the previous episode, which was watched by 0.58 million viewers with a 0.2 in the 18-49 demographics.

=== Critical reviews ===
"Untitled" received critical acclaim. Matt Fowler of IGN gave the episode an "amazing" 9 out of 10 and wrote in his verdict, "This week, Louie perfectly blended stand-up, time with Lilly and Jane, happenstance hilarity, and quickly madness."

Brandon Nowalk of The A.V. Club gave the episode an "A" grade and wrote, "Louie's crotch swirl is kind of humorous. The boogeyman brought tears to my eyes. It can't be understood, and that deepens the terror, drawing us in. That's what makes 'Untitled' unshakable."

Danielle Henderson of Vulture gave the episode a perfect 5 star rating out of 5 and wrote, "What if this episode were all about the song at the end and not the eyeless, bald, face-sucking monster in human form hopping all over Louie's nightmares? This episode was supremely fucked-up, and there really isn't a more gentle way to say that." Randy Dankievitch of TV Overmind wrote, "'Untitled' is just another example of how masterful Louis C.K. can be when he finds a singular prism to view them through."

Joe Matar of Den of Geek gave the episode a 3.5 rating out of 5 and wrote, "'Untitled' is a goofy episode. Very little happens that we're supposed to care about so it's not one of those Louie that's going to make you feel a lot (aside from some fear, perhaps), but it's nice that this show can commit to a throwaway mindfuck and make it this much fun." Shane Ryan of Paste gave the episode a 9 out of 10 and wrote, "The dream that becomes a nightmare that becomes a cold-sweat awakening that becomes another dream that becomes a horrible pattern, continuing indefinitely... is not exactly a new trope in television or film. Nevertheless, Louis C.K. found a way to make it particularly indelible, and hilarious, in 'Untitled,' the fifth episode of Louie's fifth season."
