= Mr. Paris Shoes =

- The Knick episode
- Episode no.: Season 1 Episode 2
- Directed by: Steven Soderbergh
- Written by: Jack Amiel; Michael Begler
- Cinematography by: Peter Andrews (Note: Pseudonym for Steven Soderbergh.)
- Editing by: Mary Ann Bernard
- Original release date: August 15, 2014
- Running time: 49 minutes

Guest appearances
- Emily Bergl as Mrs. Hemming; Melissa Errico as Catherine Christiansen; Danny Hoch as Bunky Collier; Rob Morgan as Diggs Man; Andy Murray as Clarence Mulkeen; Happy Anderson as Mr. James "Jimmy" Fester; Lucas Papaelias as Eldon Pouncey; Suzanne Savoy as Victoria Robertson; Perry Yung as Ping Wu; Bridget Barkan as Nora; Ashley Bryant as Infirmary Nurse; Christopher Gates as Dr. Lyons; Ryan Homchick as Orderly Schleif; Robert Michael Hugel as Mr. Gatchell; Caitlin Johnston as Nurse Monk; Victoria Leigh as Cora Hemming; David Neal Levin as Mr. Olynyk; Ying Ying Li as Lin-Lin; Pei Pei Lin as Delores; Dean Neistat as McCarthy; Kim Rideout as Cornelia's Maid; Erika Rolfsrud as Dr. Edwards' Patient's Mother; Zuzanna Szadkowski as Nurse Pell; Pernell Walker as Ida Harris

Episode chronology
← Previous "Method and Madness"	Next → "The Busy Flea"

"Mr. Paris Shoes" is the second episode of the American medical period drama television series The Knick. The episode was written by series creators Jack Amiel and Michael Begler, and directed by executive producer Steven Soderbergh. It originally aired on Cinemax on August 15, 2014.

The series is set in New York City in the early twentieth century and follows the staff of the Knickerbocker Hospital (the Knick), who struggle against the limitations of medical understanding and practice. The protagonist is Dr. John Thackery, the new leader of the surgery staff, who balances his cocaine and opium addictions against his ambition for medical discovery and his reputation among his peers. In the episode, the hospital faces a short-circuit, while the characters face different problems.

According to Nielsen Media Research, the episode was seen by an estimated 0.419 million household viewers and gained a 0.13 ratings share among adults aged 18–49. The episode received extremely positive reviews from critics, who praised the new focus on the characters.

== Plot ==
Cornelia (Juliet Rylance) eats breakfast with her father, August (Grainger Hines). Their house is tended by servants, although Cornelia still feels pressure in living up to the standards that her father wants, as she considers limitations against women. In the Tenderloin district, Edwards (André Holland) lives in a seedy boardinghouse that caters to African-Americans. Both Cornelia and Edwards separately go to work, while Elkins (Eve Hewson) arrives on a bike.

At the Knick, Thackery (Clive Owen) leads a surgery during which he uses a cauterizer powered by the newly-installed electricity. However, the cauterizer suffers a short-circuit, which lights the patient on fire and kills a nurse. Later, Thackery loses another patient to aortic aneurysm, so he asks Gallinger (Eric Johnson) and Chickering (Michael Angarano) to find a journal article on a new procedure. They retrieve it from another hospital, even though the article is in French. He also privately asks Elkins to maintain secrecy about his drug addiction, threatening to end her career if she says anything.

With multiple malfunctions in the electricity, Barrow (Jeremy Bobb) is assigned to fix it. However, Barrow is actually responsible for the run-ins; he didn't hire a reliable contractor, as he skimmed funds to pay his own debts to a loan shark, Bunky Collier (Danny Hoch). He visits Collier to extend the deadline. Collier gives him two more days, but removes one of Barrow's teeth as a collateral.

Edwards is given his own office, which is at the basement of the hospital, and is only given very minimal tasks. Despite the limitations, Edwards decides to open a small clinic to tend African-Americans who cannot afford the hospital's bills. He returns home, where he is confronted by his neighbor, who mocks his style and even steps on his expensive shoes. Fed up, Edwards brutally beats the man and goes back inside.

== Production ==
=== Development ===
In July 2014, Cinemax announced that the second episode of the season would be titled "Mr. Paris Shoes", and that it would be written by series creators Jack Amiel and Michael Begler, and directed by executive producer Steven Soderbergh. This was Amiel's second writing credit, Begler's second writing credit, and Soderbergh's second directing credit.

== Reception ==
=== Viewers ===
In its original American broadcast, "Mr. Paris Shoes" was seen by an estimated 0.419 million household viewers with a 0.13 in the 18-49 demographics. This means that 0.13 percent of all households with televisions watched the episode. This was a 18% increase in viewership from the previous episode, which was watched by an estimated 0.354 million household viewers.

=== Critical reviews ===
"Mr. Paris Shoes" received extremely positive reviews from critics. The review aggregator website Rotten Tomatoes reported an 90% approval rating for the episode, based on 10 reviews. The site's consensus states: "'Mr. Paris Shoes' successfully delves into deeper thematic territory, further establishing conflicts and drawing viewers into the lives of its characters."

Matt Fowler of IGN gave the episode a "great" 8.3 out of 10 and wrote in his verdict, "The Knick continues to intrigue as we grow more invested in the lives of the hospital staff. The various elements of the show are beginning to come together to paint a much broader picture of the era. A flashback scene with Dr. Christiansen showed us that not only was Thackery brought on as a favor but that the staggering patient death toll was part of the package deal. 'Mr. Paris Shoes' felt a bit light in the resolution department. Not that I needed everything wrapped up and couldn't stand for stories to travel forward, but the lights, the typhoid fever, the aortic procedure are all still very much up in the air. As if we were given the first of a 'two-parter.'"

Brandon Nowalk of The A.V. Club gave the episode a "B" grade and wrote, "Certainly The Knick isn't breaking new ground centering on a badly behaved straight white male protagonist. The writers found a new drug and a new sexual provocation, but Thack's not so different from the work genius/home slobs on all the other channels. Even the regular flashbacks to a mentor resemble Tommy Gavin's hallucinations on Rescue Me. What 'Mr. Paris Shoes' adds to the complaint mix is the frustrating serialization of the antihero drama. It launches a bunch of ships but only one makes anything like a journey within the episode. Steven Soderbergh told The Daily Beast, 'I very much viewed [the season] as a 10-hour film.' More power to him, but this thing is presented in 10 installments."

Debbie Day of Entertainment Weekly wrote, "Two episodes in, The Knick must prove to the audience why we should care about these characters and their challenges. So far the Cinemax show has received critical acclaim on par with Boardwalk Empire and Gangs of New York. But in a TV landscape that is populated with a fantastical universe like HBO's juggernaut Game of Thrones or historical science fiction like promising Starz series Outlander, can these Knick characters hold up? 'Mr. Paris Shoes' indicates yes — the flood lamps are turned on the players, exposing soft underbellies, torn seams, and frayed edges, as standout conflicts slowly emerge and present themselves as full-on personal battles." Keith Uhlich of Vulture gave the episode a perfect 5 star rating out of 5 and wrote, "One of the great joys of drama is that we're frequently able to glimpse the disparate existences that are off limits to the other players. We get to see the disguises each character wears, the behaviors they affect and the habits they follow, even when hiding in plain sight." Steve MacFarlane of Slant Magazine wrote, "The most involving scenes in 'Mr. Paris Shoes' tend to be the ones that are-without being wordless, obviously-not what they call 'dialogue scenes.'"

Gerri Mahn of Den of Geek gave the episode a 4 star rating out of 5 and wrote, "Tonight's episode is definitely a step up from the last. Soderbergh, who directed the entire season, has toned down the jarring music and woven color seamlessly throughout the sets. Scenes of Thackery in his office with Lucy, and then later in the opium den are quite similar in that they are dark and practically steaming with atmosphere." Robert Ham of Paste gave the episode a 9.1 out of 10 and wrote, "Viewed from a distance of 114 years, all those interactions feel downright deplorable, fictional though they are... we are given a stark look at race relations, which might have been otherwise ignored on another show."
