= A La Carte (Louie) =

- Louie episode
- Episode no.: Season 5 Episode 2
- Directed by: Louis C.K.
- Story by: Louis C.K.; Pamela Adlon
- Teleplay by: Louis C.K.
- Cinematography by: Paul Koestner
- Editing by: Louis C.K.
- Production code: XCK05002
- Original air date: April 16, 2015
- Running time: 24 minutes

Guest appearances
- Hadley Delany as Lilly; Ursula Parker as Jane; Pamela Adlon as Pamela; Nate Fernald as Bart Folding; Jimmy Fallon as Himself; Mike Bocchetti as Himself; Steven Wright as Comic Strip MC

Episode chronology
← Previous "Pot Luck"	Next → "Cop Story"
- Louie (season 5)

"A La Carte" is the second episode of the fifth season of the American comedy-drama television series Louie. It is the 55th overall episode of the series and was written and directed by Louis C.K., who also serves as the lead actor, with producer Pamela Adlon receiving a co-story credit. It was released on FX on April 16, 2015.

The series follows Louie, a fictionalized version of C.K., a comedian and newly divorced father raising his two daughters in New York City. In the episode, Louie finds himself in a predicament while going shopping, while also questioning his relationship with Pamela.

According to Nielsen Media Research, the episode was seen by an estimated 0.47 million household viewers and gained a 0.2 ratings share among adults aged 18–49. The episode received near critical acclaim, with critics praising the humor, and many deemed it an improvement over the premiere episode.

== Plot ==
Louie (Louis C.K.) goes grocery shopping with Lilly (Hadley Delany) and Jane (Ursula Parker). However, he feels the need to poop while they are paying. Louie is unable to run, so he throws away their grocery bags to move faster. After being unable to find a bathroom, he tells the girls to go off while he remains behind in the street.

At the Comic Strip, Louie is asked by a friend to host an open mic night, and he accepts after negotiating for $500. The show goes relatively well, but a young comedian, Bart (Nate Fernald), is poorly received for his unfunny, creepy routine. Bart asks Louie for help in how to improve, but Louie only gives him the advice of speaking in a high-pitched voice, as he does not consider him funny at all.

Louie takes a reluctant Pamela (Pamela Adlon) to watch a French film at the theater. Bored, they decide to go to an Italian restaurant. Louie proposes moving in together, but she wants to keep an open relationship, describing themselves as à la carte. When Louie worries that she might find someone and forget him, Pamela says she loves him. Later, while Pamela sleeps alongside him, Louie watches The Tonight Show Starring Jimmy Fallon. To his surprise, he finds that Bart has become a popular comedian, having employed a high-pitched voice like he suggested.

== Production ==
=== Development ===
In March 2015, FX confirmed that the second episode of the season would be titled "A La Carte", and that it would be written and directed by series creator and lead actor Louis C.K., with producer Pamela Adlon receiving a co-story credit. This was C.K.'s 55th writing and directing credit, and Adlon's sixth writing credit.

== Reception ==
=== Viewers ===
In its original American broadcast, "A La Carte" was seen by an estimated 0.47 million household viewers with a 0.2 in the 18-49 demographics. This means that 0.2 percent of all households with televisions watched the episode. This was a 26% decrease in viewership with the previous episode, which was watched by 0.63 million viewers with a 0.3 in the 18-49 demographics.

=== Critical reviews ===
"A La Carte" received near critical acclaim. Matt Fowler of IGN gave the episode a "good" 7.8 out of 10 and wrote in his verdict, "'A La Carte' gave us some more great Pamela/Louie moments (cutting off his flashback, tricking him in the movie theater, etc) though it did seem like they were headed somewhere more serious as Season 4 came to a close. So this heart-to-heart may have been away to distance the series, a little bit, from the poignancy and pathos of last year. The s***ting the pants bit was amazing though."

Alan Sepinwall of HitFix wrote, "So far, this has been a back-to-basics season for Louie, and it's hard to imagine a more vintage-feeling episode of the show than 'A La Carte,' with its three vignettes – one wholly separate, the other two tying together at the very end – and mix of balls-out comedy, awkwardness, and pathos." Brandon Nowalk of The A.V. Club gave the episode an "A" grade and wrote, "From past episodes, I don't think Louie would say his mother doesn’t love him, but there is some overlap to the two stories. That's because 'A La Carte' isn't just about the life not lived. It's also about the life that's already been lived, most explicitly the cycle Pamela describes from friendship to divorce and alienation."

Danielle Henderson of Vulture gave the episode a perfect 5 star rating out of 5 and wrote, "There are three things Louie is struggling with in this episode: He's not sure if he can give the right advice to a new comedian, he's not sure if Pamela can be faithful to him, and he's not sure if he’s going to crap his pants at a grocery store." Joe Matar of Den of Geek gave the episode a perfect 5 rating out of 5 and wrote, "Altogether, 'A la Carte' reinforces that Louie is going to continue to tackle whatever it fancies and will still chuck the occasional absurdist non-sequitur at you, but it's also not forgotten the sense of continuity that defined season four. It feels like a marriage of both versions of the show thus far and I love the way it's shaping up."
