= Sleepover (Louie) =

- Louie episode
- Episode no.: Season 5 Episode 6
- Directed by: Louis C.K.
- Story by: Louis C.K.; Pamela Adlon
- Teleplay by: Louis C.K.
- Cinematography by: Paul Koestner
- Editing by: Louis C.K.; Gina Sansom
- Production code: XCK05006
- Original air date: May 14, 2015
- Running time: 25 minutes

Guest appearances
- Hadley Delany as Lilly; Ursula Parker as Jane; Pamela Adlon as Pamela; Robert Kelly as Bobby; Matthew Broderick as Man; Michael Cera as Young Man; Glenn Close as Woman; John Lithgow as Funny Man; Hannah Patelumas as Young Woman

Episode chronology
| ← Previous "Untitled" | Next → "The Road" |
- Louie (season 5)

"Sleepover" is the sixth episode of the fifth season of the American comedy-drama television series Louie. It is the 59th overall episode of the series and was written and directed by Louis C.K., who also serves as the lead actor, with producer Pamela Adlon receiving a story credit. It was released on FX on May 14, 2015.

The series follows Louie, a fictionalized version of C.K., a comedian and newly divorced father raising his two daughters in New York City. In the episode, Louie hosts a sleepover at his apartment for Jane's friends.

According to Nielsen Media Research, the episode was seen by an estimated 0.41 million household viewers and gained a 0.2 ratings share among adults aged 18–49. The episode received mostly positive reviews from critics, who praised the humor and performances. At the 67th Primetime Emmy Awards, Louis C.K. received a nomination for Outstanding Directing for a Comedy Series.

== Plot ==
Louie (Louis C.K.) takes Lilly (Hadley Delany) to a play starring Matthew Broderick, Glenn Close, John Lithgow, and Michael Cera. While Louie and the audience praise the actors, Lilly spends time texting, upsetting him. After the play ends, he reprimands her and demands she hand over the phone. She defends herself by claiming she was reading information on the play, so Louie forgets about the event.

After having Lilly go out, Louie hosts a sleepover party for Jane (Ursula Parker) and her friends. The girls demand a sundae, but Louie is adamant that they will eat only after a pizza arrives. He is then called by Pamela (Pamela Adlon) and their conversation soon turns sexual. However, Louie is forced to hang up when he must tend the sleepover, while Pamela is revealed to be on a date. Suddenly, Louie is called by Bobby (Robert Kelly) who was arrested and asks him to bail him out within one hour or he will spend the night in jail. Louie reluctantly agrees to go and is forced to take the girls with him.

At the station, the girls' erratic behavior annoys the officers, but they decide to accelerate the bailing process, releasing Bobby. On the way back, Bobby relates a false and absurd story about his arrest. Louie, Bobby, the girls, and the taxi driver then stop to eat ice cream at a store. The following morning, as the girls leave, Louie asks Bobby about the real reason behind his arrest. He states that he went to a massage parlor for a "happy ending" and was arrested when the place was raided.

== Production ==
=== Development ===
In April 2015, FX confirmed that the sixth episode of the season would be titled "Sleepover", and that it would be written and directed by series creator and lead actor Louis C.K., with producer Pamela Adlon receiving a story credit. This was C.K.'s 59th writing and directing credit, and Adlon's seventh writing credit.

== Reception ==
=== Viewers ===
In its original American broadcast, "Sleepover" was seen by an estimated 0.41 million household viewers with a 0.2 in the 18-49 demographics. This means that 0.2 percent of all households with televisions watched the episode. This was a slight increase in viewership with the previous episode, which was watched by 0.37 million viewers with a 0.2 in the 18-49 demographics.

=== Critical reviews ===
"Sleepover" received mostly positive reviews from critics. Matt Fowler of IGN gave the episode a "great" 8.5 out of 10 and wrote in his verdict, "In a clever, amusing episode, Louie survived the screaming of children, the assumed-apathy of youth, the ill-timed arrest of Bobby, and mind games of Pamela."

Alan Sepinwall of HitFix wrote, "Surreal comedy (including the black-and-white version of the goat story Bobby told the girls), tender romance and thoughtful parent-child interaction, all in one episode? Not bad at all, and I slept better after this one than I did after last week's." Brandon Nowalk of The A.V. Club gave the episode a "B+" grade and wrote, "It's nice to see Louie growing. In season four, he embarks on a doomed romance, he puts his foot in his mouth so bad that Sarah Baker calls the show to a halt and expands the moment to fill the rest of the episode, and the universe takes such a dump on him that he winds up in apocalyptic debt after accidentally hitting a model in the face. Compared to that, 'Sleepover' is a fantasy."

Danielle Henderson of Vulture gave the episode a 4 star rating out of 5 and wrote, "Bobby wrapped up the episode by admitting the real reason he was arrested (massage parlor raid), and the fact that he thought yogurt and milk came from different parts of the cow. In an episode that had cameos from Matthew Broderick, Glenn Close, John Lithgow, and Michael Cera, I didn't expect the best part of the show to revolve around livestock." Randy Dankievitch of TV Overmind wrote, "After the brash nature of many episodes this season, the lightheartedness of 'Sleepover' is a much-needed change of pace for Louie, one of those laidback 'day in the life' episodes that still maintains the important undercurrents of personal and societal reflection, even as Bobby's telling stories about goats and Louie's fumbling to explain what 'raped' means to a ten year old. If that's not brilliant television, I don't know what is." Joe Matar of Den of Geek gave the episode a 4 rating out of 5 and wrote, "This isn't the best Louie of the season, and with the madness of stuff like last week's 'Untitled,' it's certainly not the most surprising one either, but 'Sleepover' is just another solid episode in what's been a consistently great little season."

=== Accolades ===
At the 67th Primetime Emmy Awards, Louis C.K. received a nomination for Outstanding Directing for a Comedy Series for the episode. He would lose to Transparent for the episode "Brand New Girl".
