= Bobby's House =

- Louie episode
- Episode no.: Season 5 Episode 4
- Directed by: Louis C.K.
- Written by: Louis C.K.
- Cinematography by: Paul Koestner
- Editing by: Louis C.K.
- Production code: XCK05004
- Original air date: April 30, 2015
- Running time: 24 minutes

Guest appearances
- Robert Kelly as Bobby; Hadley Delany as Lilly; Ursula Parker as Jane; Pamela Adlon as Pamela

Episode chronology
← Previous "Cop Story"	Next → "Untitled"
- Louie (season 5)

"Bobby's House" is the fourth episode of the fifth season of the American comedy-drama television series Louie. It is the 57th overall episode of the series and was written and directed by Louis C.K., who also serves as the lead actor. It was released on FX on April 30, 2015.

The series follows Louie, a fictionalized version of C.K., a comedian and newly divorced father raising his two daughters in New York City. In the episode, Louie is pressured by Bobby into helping him, while his relationship with Pamela leads to a bizarre sexual scenario.

According to Nielsen Media Research, the episode was seen by an estimated 0.58 million household viewers and gained a 0.2 ratings share among adults aged 18–49. The episode received mostly positive reviews from critics, who praised the humor and performances. At the 67th Primetime Emmy Awards, Louis C.K. received nominations for Outstanding Writing for a Comedy Series and Outstanding Lead Actor in a Comedy Series, while Pamela Adlon received a nomination for Outstanding Guest Actress in a Comedy Series.

== Plot ==
Louie (Louis C.K.) is called by Bobby (Robert Kelly), asking him to pick him up as their uncle has just died and they must attend his wake. There, Louie finds that Bobby mistook their uncle for another person and leaves. He takes Bobby home and he reluctantly accepts to enter. Louie is not fond of the apartment, and constantly argues with Bobby as the latter claims Louie never helped him with anything.

At a bus stop, Louie sees a woman yelling at a man and tells her to stop. The woman turns aggressive and brutally attacks Louie. He returns to the apartment where he is asked about the attack by Lilly (Hadley Delany) and Jane (Ursula Parker). He reveals that a woman was responsible, causing the girls to laugh, as well as Pamela (Pamela Adlon) when he tells her. As she puts makeup on Louie, she asks him to enact a very bizarre sexual scenario, which he reluctantly accepts.

The scenario involves Pamela acting like a man, while Louie's make-up makes him act like a girl. This culminates in sex, which makes Louie uncomfortable. After the act, Louie brings up again the subject of a relationship, which Pamela denies. She then asks to break up the relationship, as she feels he needs more, even when Louie cries. Louie later tells the story to Bobby at a restaurant, who laughs uncontrollably.

== Production ==
=== Development ===
In April 2015, FX confirmed that the fourth episode of the season would be titled "Bobby's House", and that it would be written and directed by series creator and lead actor Louis C.K. This was C.K.'s 57th writing and directing credit.

== Reception ==
=== Viewers ===
In its original American broadcast, "Bobby's House" was seen by an estimated 0.58 million household viewers with a 0.2 in the 18-49 demographics. This means that 0.2 percent of all households with televisions watched the episode. This was a 41% increase in viewership with the previous episode, which was watched by 0.41 million viewers with a 0.2 in the 18-49 demographics.

=== Critical reviews ===
"Bobby's House" received mostly positive reviews from critics. Matt Fowler of IGN gave the episode a "great" 8.2 out of 10 and wrote in his verdict, "'Bobby's House' was hero humiliation through and through. Making things more cyclical was that Louie started the episode being envied - and then wound up a laughing stock (with his mascara running, no less). Poor 'Jornetha' couldn't catch a break."

Alan Sepinwall of HitFix wrote, "Such a strange, unsettling, and at times (like the look on Louie's face as Pamela has him right where she wants him) hilarious episode of Louie." Brandon Nowalk of The A.V. Club gave the episode an "A–" grade and wrote, "Despite the humiliated, cross-dressing man at the center and the masculine-feminine power dynamic, 'Bobby's House' diverges from Cul-De-Sac thematically. The makeup and the role-play and the submission turn out not to be so bad, even kind of fun, and if anything Pamela gains respect for Louie."

Danielle Henderson of Vulture gave the episode a perfect 5 star rating out of 5 and wrote, "In the end, when Bobby is laughing at Louie, too, you're not sure if it's because he tried to revisit the tenderness of the moment they shared earlier by telling him about his breakup, or if he's laughing at the idea of Louie in makeup having sex. We're not sure what he's laughing at, but the reluctance is back with full force, and Louie regrets ever telling Bobby anything at all."

Joe Matar of Den of Geek gave the episode a perfect 5 rating out of 5 and wrote, "Thanks to the final shot, the show opener even receives closure as Bobby's pleas for Louie to somehow help him don't go unanswered. It's not a solution to any of Bobby's life problems, but Louie's misfortune at least makes Bobby so happy he can't help but laugh uncontrollably. It's minor, but it's still a payoff and it's an unexpected one, rounding out 'Bobby's House' as a gratifying episode of subtly structured chaos." Paste gave the episode a 5.7 out of 10 and wrote, "Maybe if you find the idea of Louis wearing a lot of eyeliner funny this will be interesting, but I just kept waiting for something bigger, something bolder to happen. Something to rip apart the easy reading of this story as a not especially funny mess. That's pretty much how I've felt this entire season, though, so it should probably be no surprise by now that Louie just doesn't have a punchline, or even a real destination."

=== Accolades ===
The episode received many nominations at the 67th Primetime Emmy Awards. Pamela Adlon received a nomination for Outstanding Guest Actress in a Comedy Series. Louis C.K. received a nomination for Outstanding Writing for a Comedy Series, while also submitting the episode to support his nomination for Outstanding Lead Actor in a Comedy Series. Adlon would lose to Joan Cusack for Shameless. C.K. lost the former to Veep for the episode "Election Night", and the latter to Jeffrey Tambor for Transparent.
