= 67th Primetime Emmy Awards =

Primetime Emmy Award annual ceremony

- Promotional poster
- Date: September 20, 2015 (Ceremony); September 12, 2015 (Creative Arts Awards)
- Location: Microsoft Theater, Los Angeles, California
- Presented by: Academy of Television Arts and Sciences
- Hosted by: Andy Samberg

Highlights
- Most awards: Major: Olive Kitteridge (6); All: Game of Thrones (12)
- Most nominations: American Horror Story: Freak Show (8)
- Outstanding Comedy Series: Veep
- Outstanding Drama Series: Game of Thrones
- Outstanding Limited Series: Olive Kitteridge
- Outstanding Competition Program: The Voice
- Outstanding Variety Talk Series: The Daily Show with Jon Stewart
- Website: http://www.emmys.com/

Television/radio coverage
- Network: Fox
- Produced by: Don Mischer
- Directed by: Louis J. Horvitz

The 67th Primetime Emmy Awards honored the best in American prime time television programming from June 1, 2014, until May 31, 2015, as chosen by the Academy of Television Arts & Sciences. The ceremony was held on Sunday, September 20, 2015, at the Microsoft Theater in Downtown Los Angeles, California, where 26 awards were presented, and was broadcast in the U.S. by Fox. Andy Samberg hosted the show for the first time. The nominations were announced on July 16, 2015.

The Creative Arts Emmy Awards ceremony was held on September 12 and was broadcast by FXX on September 19.

The Primetime Engineering Emmy Awards ceremony was held on October 28, 2015, at the Loews Hollywood Hotel.

The ceremony became notable for breaking two major milestones: Game of Thrones set a new record by winning 12 awards, the most for any show in a single year, up to this date (it was also the second HBO show, after The Sopranos, to win the Outstanding Drama Series award), while Viola Davis became the first African-American woman in Emmy history to win Outstanding Lead Actress in a Drama Series for her performance as Annalise Keating in How to Get Away with Murder.

This year also saw for the first time, two Streaming service networks win four Acting awards: Netflix, with Uzo Aduba in Orange Is the New Black and Reg E. Cathey in House of Cards; and Amazon Studios, with Jeffrey Tambor for Transparent and Bradley Whitford for the same show.

The Primetime Emmy Award for Outstanding Comedy Series went to the HBO political satire Veep, which not only broke Modern Family's five-year hold on the award but became the second time a premium channel won Outstanding Comedy Series (the first was for HBO's romantic comedy Sex and the City in 2001).

== Rule changes ==
The Academy of Television Arts & Sciences announced new rule changes for the 67th Primetime Emmy Awards. These new rules are:

- All voters eligible for a category's nominations are now eligible to vote in that category, providing that they have seen the submitted material and attest to no specific conflicts of interest.
- The number of nominees in the Outstanding Drama Series and Outstanding Comedy Series categories will expand from six nominees to seven, due to the increase in series production.
- To clarify the difference between a Comedy series and a Drama series, any show where episodes average a length of 30 minutes is eligible to enter as a comedy and series with episodes that average a length of 1 hour is eligible as a drama. There may be exceptions to the rules, however: producers may formally petition to a new Academy panel to have the show be considered for the alternative category. This panel, consisting of five industry leaders appointed by the Academy chairman and four appointees from the Board of Governors, will vote on a decision. A two-thirds vote was required for the show to be considered for the alternative category. So far, three petitions have been successful: Glee, Jane the Virgin, and Shameless were voted as eligible for "Outstanding Comedy Series".
- The Outstanding Miniseries was renamed as "Outstanding Limited Series". A "Limited Series" is defined as a program consisting of two or more episodes totaling 150 minutes as a whole, tell a complete, non-recurring story, and do not have an ongoing storyline and/or main characters in subsequent seasons.
- A "Guest Actor" is now defined as a performer appearing in less than 50% of the program's episodes. Only performers that fit this criterion are allowed to submit.
- The Outstanding Variety Series category has been split into two separate categories: "Outstanding Variety Talk" and "Outstanding Variety Sketch".

== Winners and nominees ==
Winners are listed first, highlighted in boldface, and indicated with a double dagger (‡). (Note: The outlets listed for each program are the U.S. broadcasters or streaming services identified in the nominations, which for some international productions are different from the broadcaster(s) that originally commissioned the program.) For simplicity, producers who received nominations for program awards, as well as nominated writers for Outstanding Writing for a Variety Series, have been omitted.

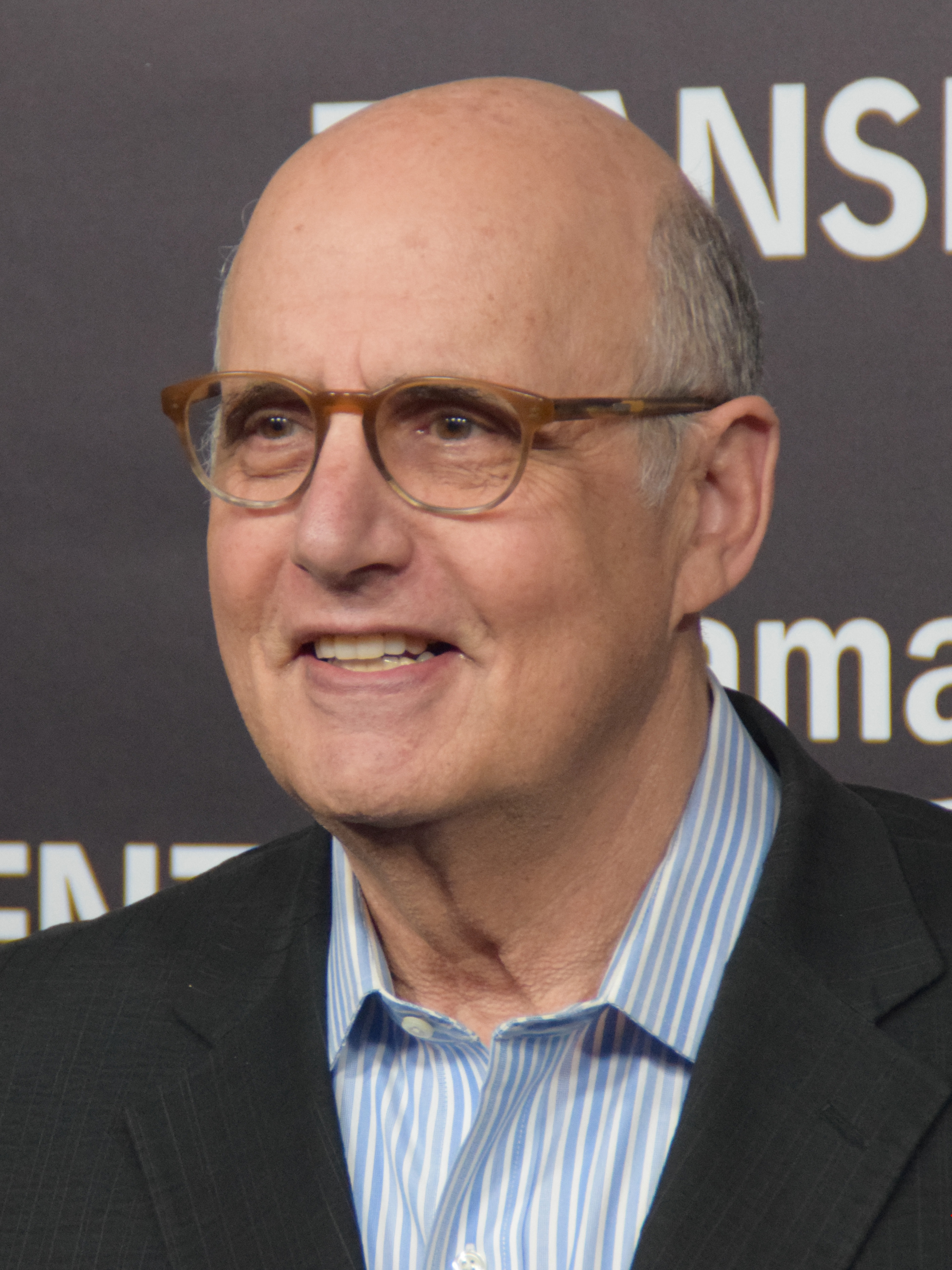
Jeffrey Tambor, Outstanding Lead Actor in a Comedy Series winner

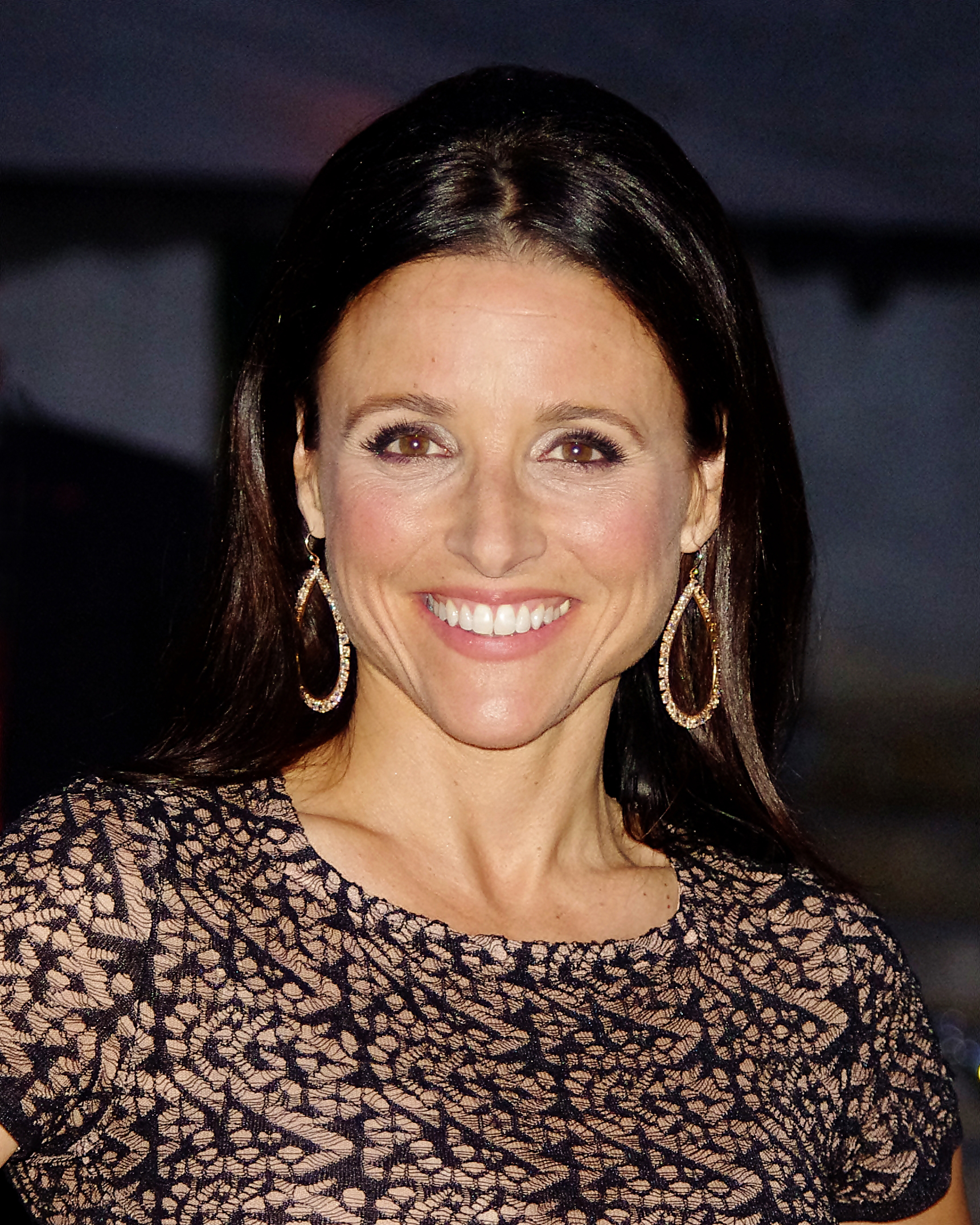
Julia Louis-Dreyfus, Outstanding Lead Actress in a Comedy Series winner

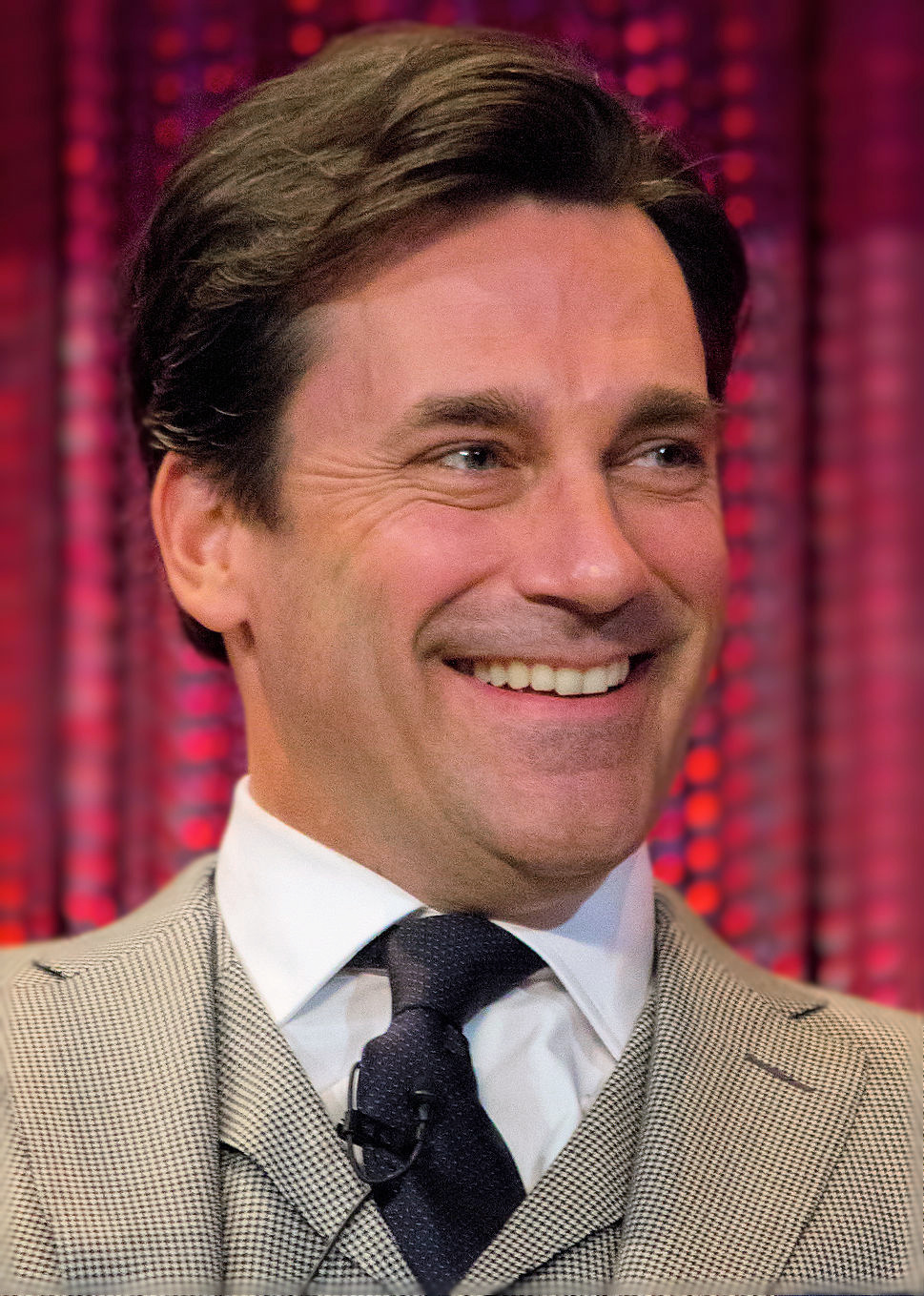
Jon Hamm, Outstanding Lead Actor in a Drama Series winner

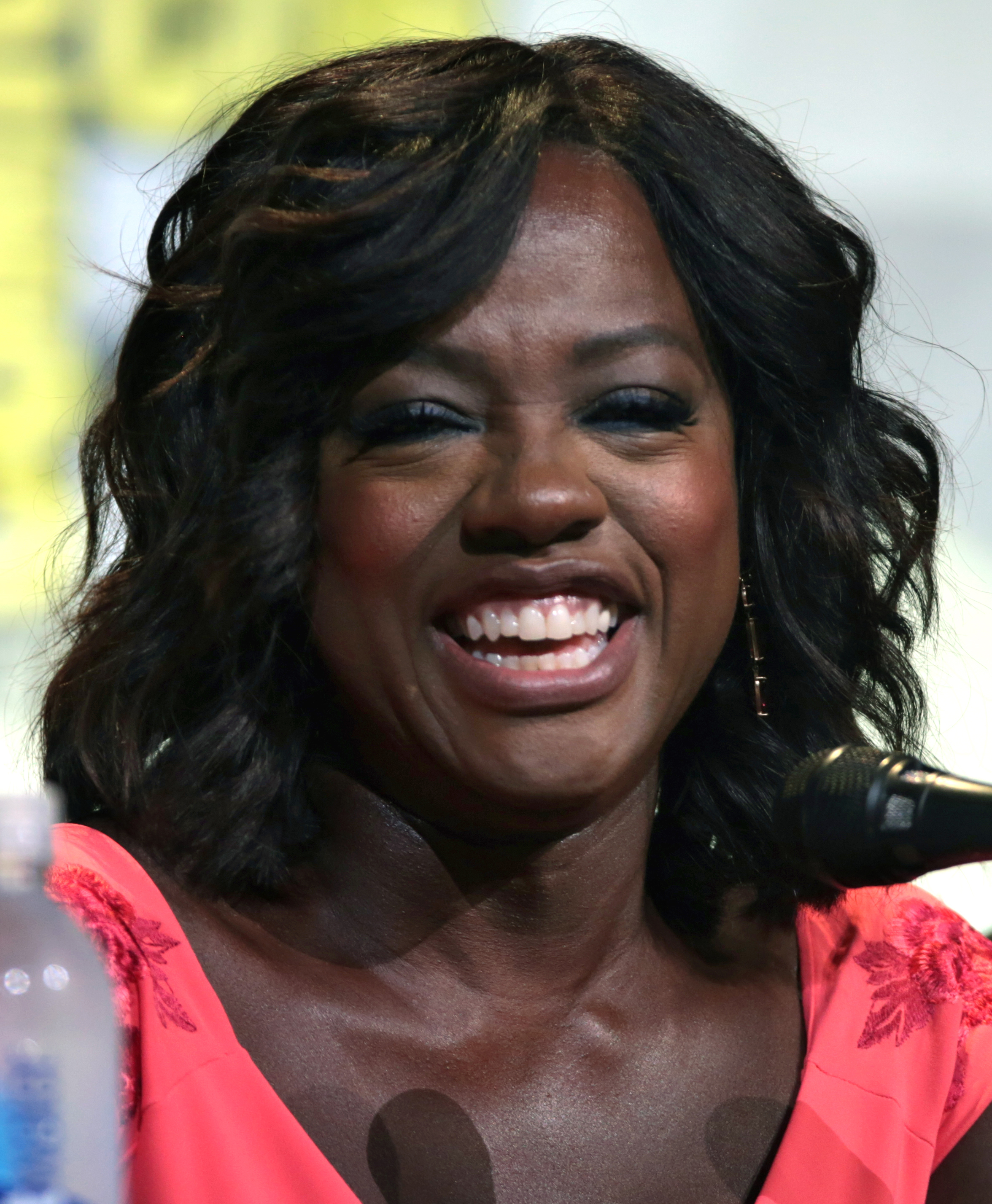
Viola Davis, Outstanding Lead Actress in a Drama Series winner

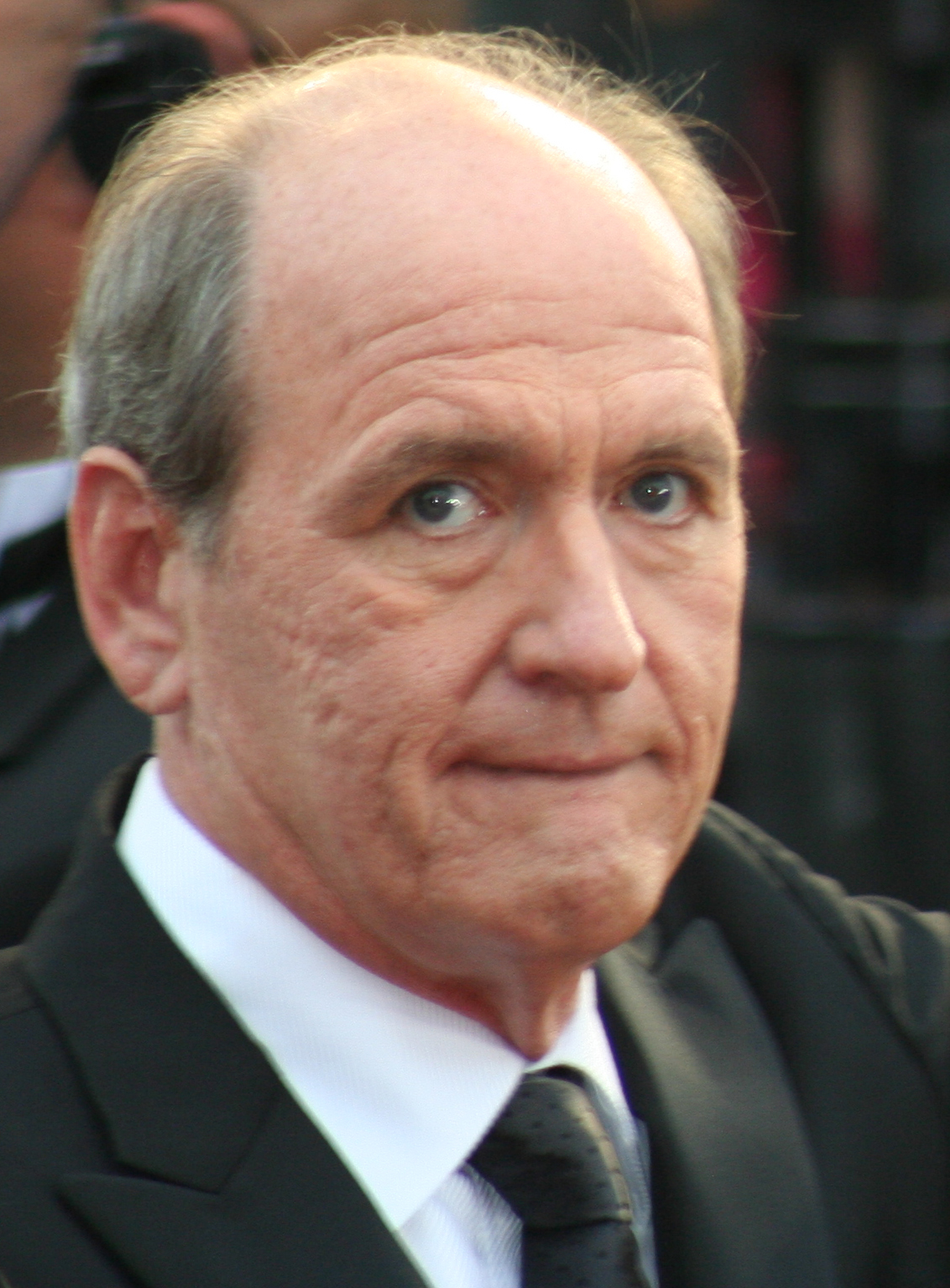
Richard Jenkins, Outstanding Lead Actor in a Limited Series or Movie winner

Frances McDormand, Outstanding Lead Actress in a Limited Series or Movie winner

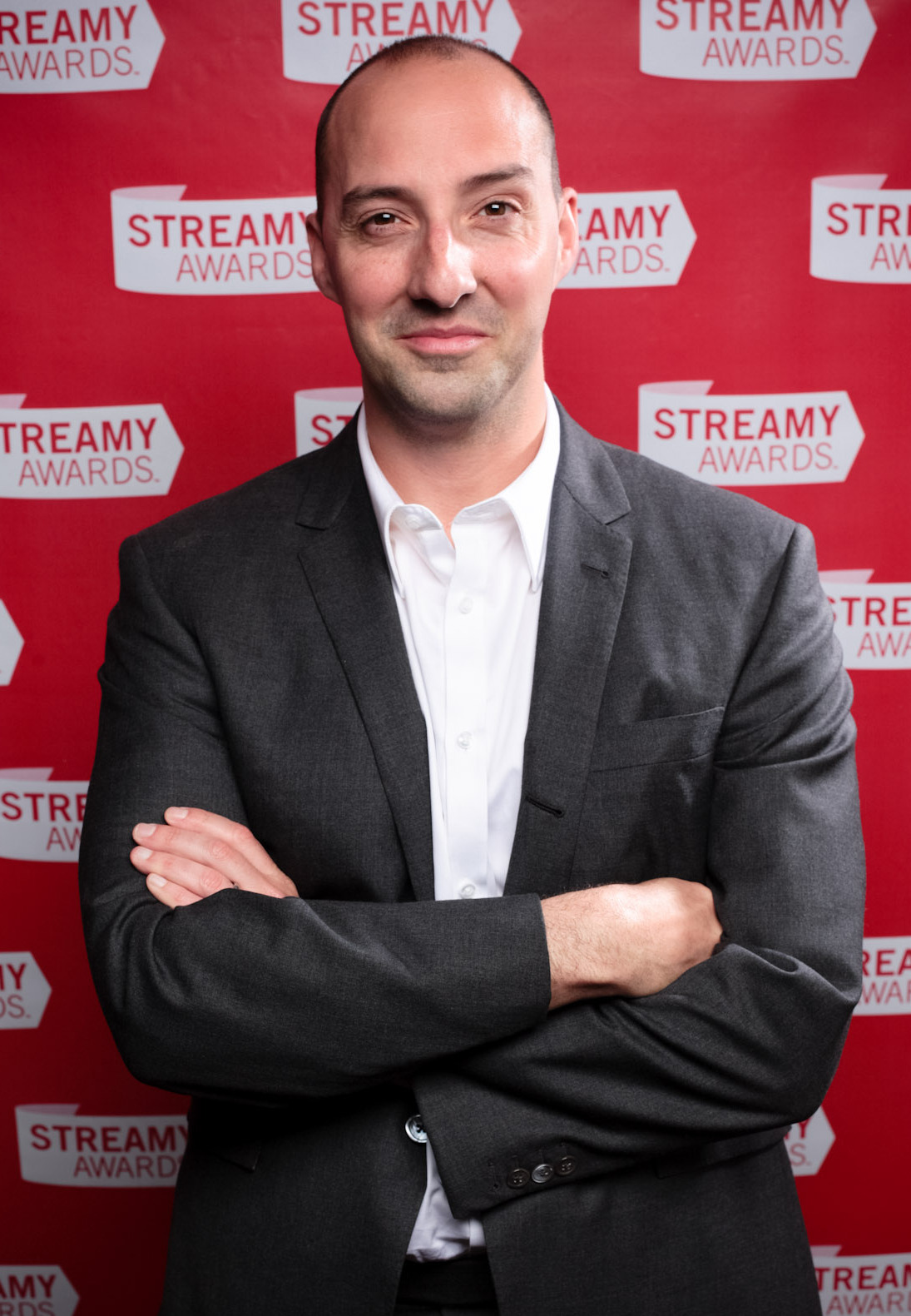
Tony Hale, Outstanding Supporting Actor in a Comedy Series winner

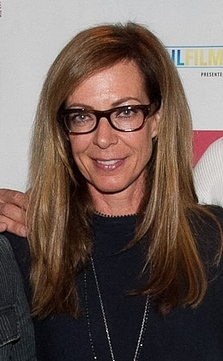
Allison Janney, Outstanding Supporting Actress in a Comedy Series winner

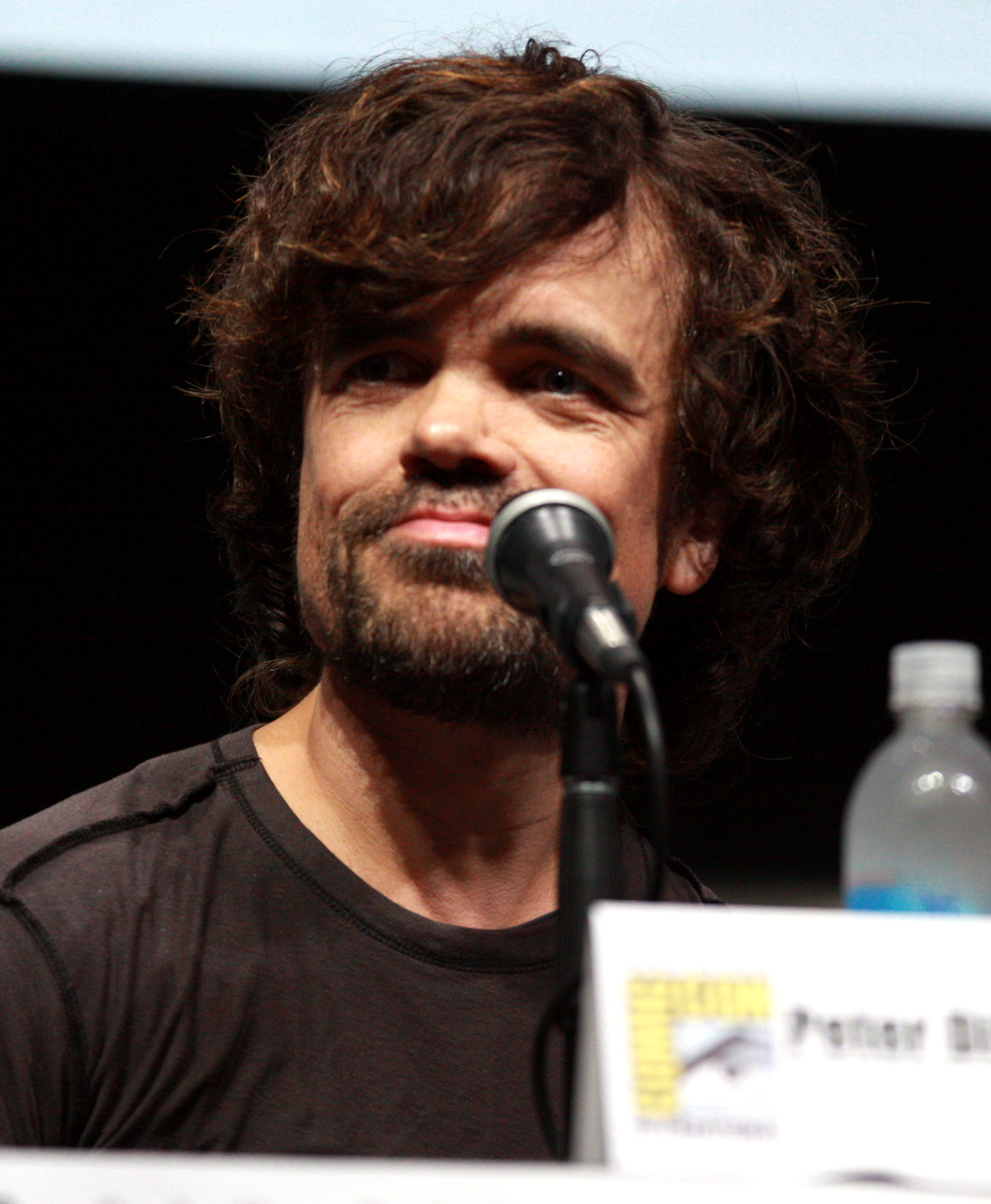
Peter Dinklage, Outstanding Supporting Actor in a Drama Series winner

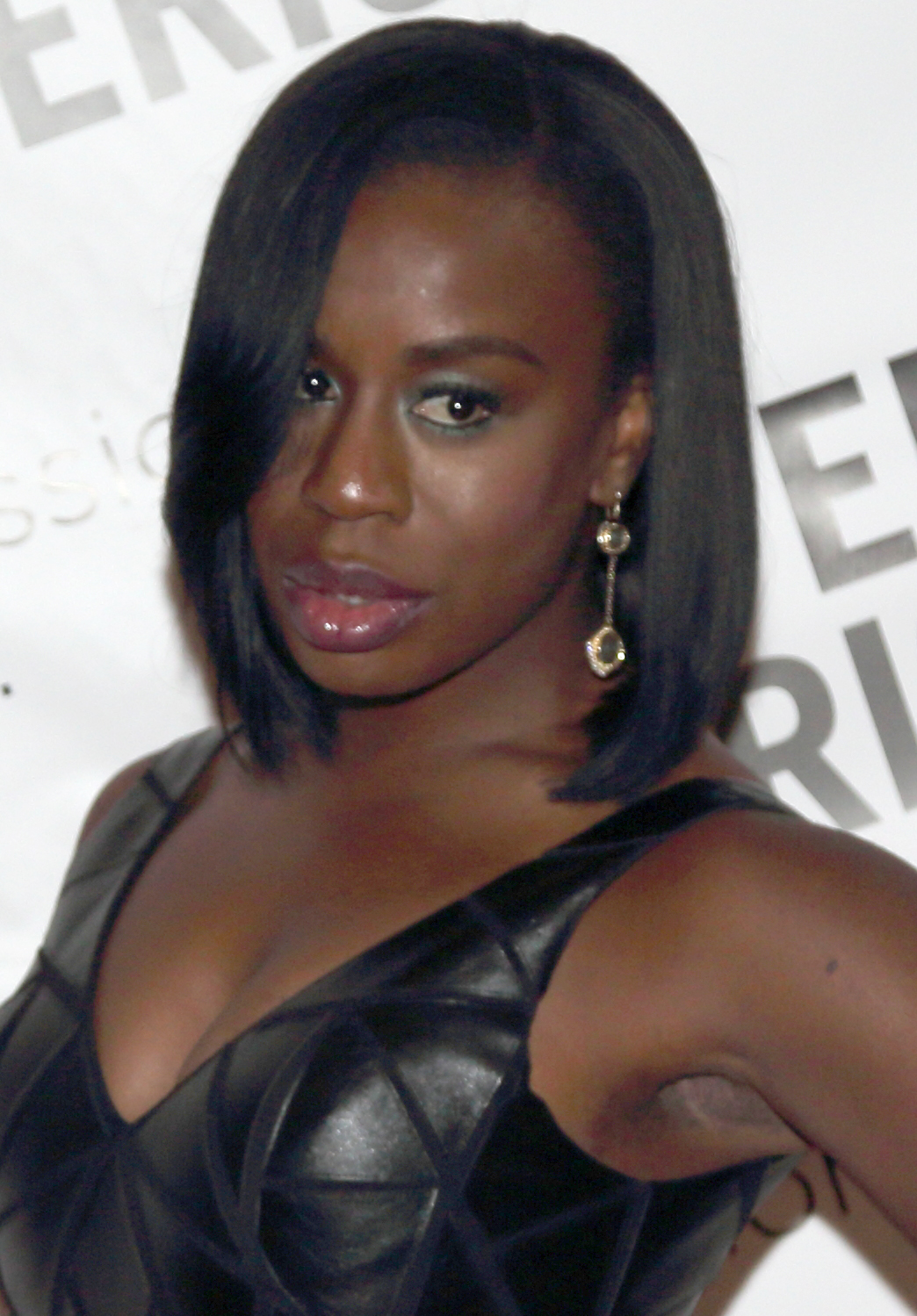
Uzo Aduba, Outstanding Supporting Actress in a Drama Series winner

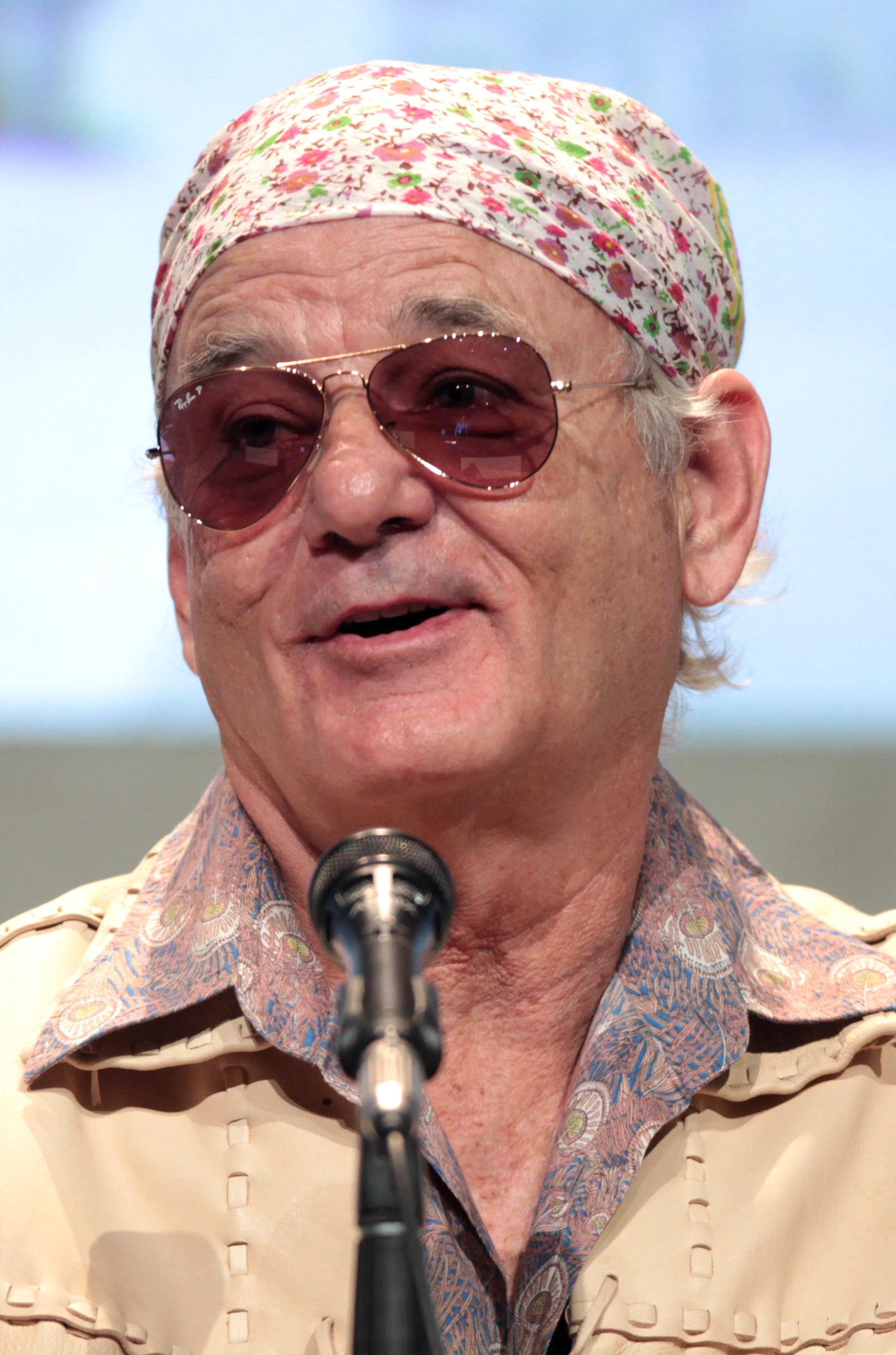
Bill Murray, Outstanding Supporting Actor in a Limited Series or Movie winner

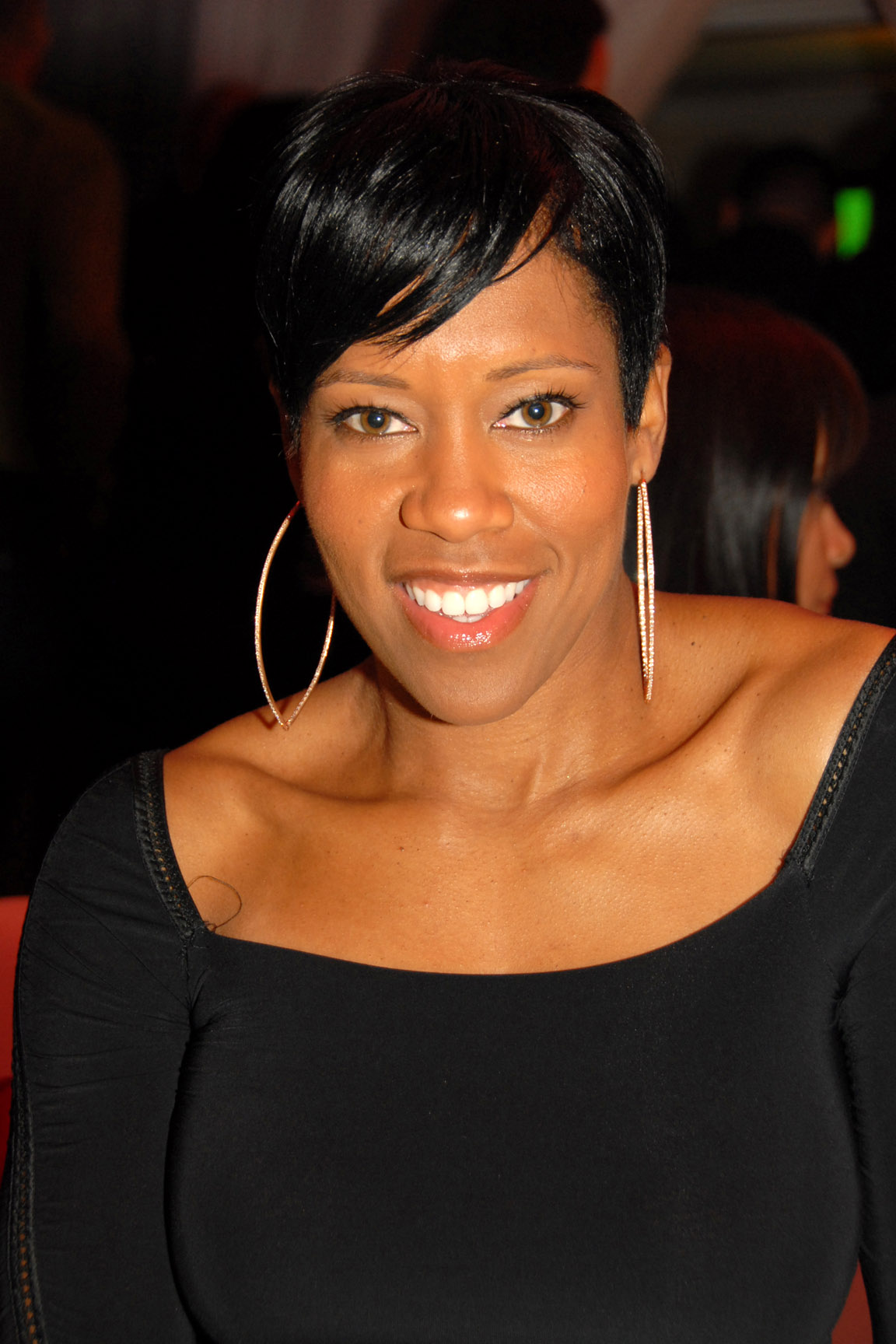
Regina King, Outstanding Supporting Actress in a Limited Series or Movie winner

=== Programs ===
Programs
| **Outstanding Comedy Series**: **Veep (HBO)**‡; Louie (FX); Modern Family (ABC); Parks and Recreation (NBC); Silicon Valley (HBO); Transparent (Amazon); Unbreakable Kimmy Schmidt (Netflix) | **Outstanding Drama Series**: **Game of Thrones (HBO)**‡; Better Call Saul (AMC); Downton Abbey (PBS); Homeland (Showtime); House of Cards (Netflix); Mad Men (AMC); Orange Is the New Black (Netflix) |
| **Outstanding Variety Talk Series**: **The Daily Show with Jon Stewart (Comedy Central)**‡; The Colbert Report (Comedy Central); Jimmy Kimmel Live! (ABC); Last Week Tonight with John Oliver (HBO); Late Show with David Letterman (CBS); The Tonight Show Starring Jimmy Fallon (NBC) | **Outstanding Variety Sketch Series**: **Inside Amy Schumer (Comedy Central)**‡; Drunk History (Comedy Central); Key & Peele (Comedy Central); Portlandia (IFC); Saturday Night Live (NBC) |
| **Outstanding Limited Series**: **Olive Kitteridge (HBO)**‡; American Crime (ABC); American Horror Story: Freak Show (FX); The Honorable Woman (Sundance TV); Wolf Hall (PBS) | **Outstanding Reality-Competition Program**: **The Voice (NBC)**‡; The Amazing Race (CBS); Dancing with the Stars (ABC); Project Runway (Lifetime); So You Think You Can Dance (Fox); Top Chef (Bravo) |

=== Acting ===
==== Lead performances ====
Lead performances
| **Outstanding Lead Actor in a Comedy Series**: **Jeffrey Tambor – Transparent as Maura Pfefferman (Amazon)**‡; Anthony Anderson – Black-ish as Andre "Dre" Johnson Sr. (ABC); Don Cheadle – House of Lies as Marty Kaan (Showtime); Louis C.K. – Louie as Louie (FX); Will Forte – The Last Man on Earth as Phil "Tandy" Miller (Fox); Matt LeBlanc – Episodes as himself (Showtime); William H. Macy – Shameless as Frank Gallagher (Showtime) | **Outstanding Lead Actress in a Comedy Series**: **Julia Louis-Dreyfus – Veep as President Selina Meyer (HBO)**‡; Edie Falco – Nurse Jackie as Jackie Peyton, RN (Showtime); Lisa Kudrow – The Comeback as Valerie Cherish (HBO); Amy Poehler – Parks and Recreation as Leslie Knope (NBC); Amy Schumer – Inside Amy Schumer as Amy / various characters (Comedy Central); Lily Tomlin – Grace and Frankie as Frankie Bergstein (Netflix) |
| **Outstanding Lead Actor in a Drama Series**: **Jon Hamm – Mad Men as Don Draper (AMC)**‡; Kyle Chandler – Bloodline as John Rayburn (Netflix); Jeff Daniels – The Newsroom as Will McAvoy (HBO); Bob Odenkirk – Better Call Saul as Jimmy McGill (AMC); Liev Schreiber – Ray Donovan as Ray Donovan (Showtime); Kevin Spacey – House of Cards as President Frank Underwood (Netflix) | **Outstanding Lead Actress in a Drama Series**: **Viola Davis – How to Get Away with Murder as Professor Annalise Keating (ABC)**‡; Claire Danes – Homeland as Carrie Mathison (Showtime); Taraji P. Henson – Empire as Cookie Lyon (Fox); Tatiana Maslany – Orphan Black as various characters (BBC America); Elisabeth Moss – Mad Men as Peggy Olson (AMC); Robin Wright – House of Cards as First Lady Claire Underwood (Netflix) |
| **Outstanding Lead Actor in a Limited Series or Movie**: **Richard Jenkins – Olive Kitteridge as Henry Kitteridge (HBO)**‡; Adrien Brody – Houdini as Harry Houdini (History); Ricky Gervais – Derek: The Special as Derek Noakes (Netflix); Timothy Hutton – American Crime as Russ Skokie (ABC); David Oyelowo – Nightingale as Peter Snowden (HBO); Mark Rylance – Wolf Hall as Thomas Cromwell (PBS) | **Outstanding Lead Actress in a Limited Series or Movie**: **Frances McDormand – Olive Kitteridge as Olive Kitteridge (HBO)**‡; Maggie Gyllenhaal – The Honorable Woman as Nessa Stein (Sundance TV); Felicity Huffman – American Crime as Barbara "Barb" Hanlon (ABC); Jessica Lange – American Horror Story: Freak Show as Elsa Mars (FX); Queen Latifah – Bessie as Bessie Smith (HBO); Emma Thompson – Live from Lincoln Center – Sweeney Todd: The Demon Barber of Fleet Street in Concert with the New York Philharmonic as Mrs. Lovett (PBS) |

==== Supporting performances ====
Supporting performances
| **Outstanding Supporting Actor in a Comedy Series**: **Tony Hale – Veep as Gary Walsh (HBO)**‡; Andre Braugher – Brooklyn Nine-Nine as Captain Ray Holt (Fox); Tituss Burgess – Unbreakable Kimmy Schmidt as Titus Andromedon (Netflix); Ty Burrell – Modern Family as Phil Dunphy (ABC); Adam Driver – Girls as Adam Sackler (HBO); Keegan-Michael Key – Key & Peele as various characters (Comedy Central) | **Outstanding Supporting Actress in a Comedy Series**: **Allison Janney – Mom as Bonnie Plunkett (CBS)**‡; Mayim Bialik – The Big Bang Theory as Dr. Amy Farrah Fowler (CBS); Julie Bowen – Modern Family as Claire Dunphy (ABC); Anna Chlumsky – Veep as Amy Brookheimer (HBO); Gaby Hoffmann – Transparent as Alexandria "Ali" Pfefferman (Amazon); Jane Krakowski – Unbreakable Kimmy Schmidt as Jacqueline Voorhees (Netflix); Kate McKinnon – Saturday Night Live as various characters (NBC); Niecy Nash – Getting On as Denise "DiDi" Ortley (HBO) |
| **Outstanding Supporting Actor in a Drama Series**: **Peter Dinklage – Game of Thrones as Tyrion Lannister (HBO)**‡; Jonathan Banks – Better Call Saul as Mike Ehrmantraut (AMC); Jim Carter – Downton Abbey as Charles Carson (PBS); Alan Cumming – The Good Wife as Eli Gold (CBS); Michael Kelly – House of Cards as Doug Stamper (Netflix); Ben Mendelsohn – Bloodline as Danny Rayburn (Netflix) | **Outstanding Supporting Actress in a Drama Series**: **Uzo Aduba – Orange Is the New Black as Suzanne "Crazy Eyes" Warren (Netflix)**‡; Christine Baranski – The Good Wife as Diane Lockhart (CBS); Emilia Clarke – Game of Thrones as Daenerys Targaryen (HBO); Joanne Froggatt – Downton Abbey as Anna Bates (PBS); Lena Headey – Game of Thrones as Cersei Lannister (HBO); Christina Hendricks – Mad Men as Joan Harris (AMC) |
| **Outstanding Supporting Actor in a Limited Series or Movie**: **Bill Murray – Olive Kitteridge as Jack Kennison (HBO)**‡; Richard Cabral – American Crime as Hector Tonz (ABC); Damian Lewis – Wolf Hall as Henry VIII of England (PBS); Denis O'Hare – American Horror Story: Freak Show as Stanley (FX); Michael K. Williams – Bessie as Jack Gee (HBO); Finn Wittrock – American Horror Story: Freak Show as Dandy Mott (FX) | **Outstanding Supporting Actress in a Limited Series or Movie**: **Regina King – American Crime as Aliyah Shadeed (ABC)**‡; Angela Bassett – American Horror Story: Freak Show as Desiree Dupree (FX); Kathy Bates – American Horror Story: Freak Show as Ethel Darling (FX); Zoe Kazan – Olive Kitteridge as Denise Thibodeau (HBO); Mo'Nique – Bessie as Ma Rainey (HBO); Sarah Paulson – American Horror Story: Freak Show as Bette and Dot Tattler (FX) |

=== Directing ===
Directing
| **Outstanding Directing for a Comedy Series**: **Transparent: "Best New Girl" – Joey Soloway (Amazon)**‡; The Last Man on Earth: "Alive in Tucson" – Phil Lord and Christopher Miller (Fox); Louie: "Sleepover" – Louis C.K. (FX); Silicon Valley: "Sand Hill Shuffle" – Mike Judge (HBO); Veep: "Testimony" – Armando Iannucci (HBO) | **Outstanding Directing for a Drama Series**: **Game of Thrones: "Mother's Mercy" – David Nutter (HBO)**‡; Boardwalk Empire: "Eldorado" – Tim Van Patten (HBO); Game of Thrones: "Unbowed, Unbent, Unbroken" – Jeremy Podeswa (HBO); Homeland: "From A to B and Back Again" – Lesli Linka Glatter (Showtime); The Knick: "Method and Madness" – Steven Soderbergh (Cinemax) |
| **Outstanding Directing for a Variety Series**: **The Daily Show with Jon Stewart: "Episode 20103" – Chuck O'Neil (Comedy Central)**‡; The Colbert Report: "Episode 11040" – James Hoskinson (Comedy Central); Inside Amy Schumer: "12 Angry Men Inside Amy Schumer" – Amy Schumer and Ryan McFaul (Comedy Central); Late Show with David Letterman: "Show 4214" – Jerry Foley (CBS); The Tonight Show Starring Jimmy Fallon: "Show 203" – Dave Diomedi (NBC) | **Outstanding Directing for a Limited Series, Movie or Dramatic Special**: **Olive Kitteridge – Lisa Cholodenko (HBO)**‡; American Horror Story: Freak Show: "Monsters Among Us" – Ryan Murphy (FX); Bessie – Dee Rees (HBO); The Honorable Woman – Hugo Blick (Sundance TV); Houdini – Uli Edel (History); The Missing – Tom Shankland (Starz); Wolf Hall – Peter Kosminsky (PBS) |

=== Writing ===
Writing
| **Outstanding Writing for a Comedy Series**: **Veep: "Election Night" – Story by : Simon Blackwell, Armando Iannucci and Tony Roche** **Teleplay by : Simon Blackwell and Tony Roche (HBO)**‡; Episodes: "Episode Nine" – David Crane and Jeffrey Klarik (Showtime); The Last Man on Earth: "Alive in Tucson" – Will Forte (Fox); Louie: "Bobby's House" – Louis C.K. (FX); Silicon Valley: "Two Days of the Condor" – Alec Berg (HBO); Transparent: "Pilot" – Joey Soloway (Amazon) | **Outstanding Writing for a Drama Series**: **Game of Thrones: "Mother's Mercy" – David Benioff and D. B. Weiss (HBO)**‡; The Americans: "Do Mail Robots Dream of Electric Sheep?" – Joshua Brand (FX); Better Call Saul: "Five-O" – Gordon Smith (AMC); Mad Men: "Lost Horizon" – Matthew Weiner and Semi Chellas (AMC); Mad Men: "Person to Person" – Matthew Weiner (AMC) |
| **Outstanding Writing for a Variety Series**: **The Daily Show with Jon Stewart (Comedy Central)**‡; The Colbert Report (Comedy Central); Inside Amy Schumer (Comedy Central); Key & Peele (Comedy Central); Last Week Tonight with John Oliver (HBO) | **Outstanding Writing for a Limited Series, Movie or Dramatic Special**: **Olive Kitteridge – Jane Anderson (HBO)**‡; American Crime: "Episode One" – John Ridley (ABC); Bessie – Dee Rees, Christopher Cleveland, Bettina Gilois, and Horton Foote (HBO); Hello Ladies: The Movie – Stephen Merchant, Gene Stupnitsky, and Lee Eisenberg (HBO); The Honorable Woman – Hugo Blick (Sundance TV); Wolf Hall – Peter Straughan (PBS) |

== Most major nominations ==
Networks with multiple major nominations (Note: "Major" constitutes the categories listed above: Program, Acting, Directing, and Writing. Does not include the technical categories.)
| Network | No. of Nominations |
|---|---|
| HBO | 37 |
| Comedy Central | 14 |
| ABC | 13 |
| FX | 13 |
| Netflix | 13 |
| AMC | 10 |
| PBS | 9 |
| Showtime | 9 |
| CBS | 7 |
| NBC | 7 |
| Fox | 6 |
| Amazon | 5 |
| Sundance TV | 4 |
| History | 2 |

Programs with multiple major nominations
| Program | Category | Network | No. of Nominations |
|---|---|---|---|
| American Horror Story: Freak Show | Limited | FX | 8 |
| Game of Thrones | Drama | HBO | 7 |
| Olive Kitteridge | Limited | HBO | 7 |
| American Crime | Limited | ABC | 6 |
| Mad Men | Drama | AMC | 6 |
| Veep | Comedy | HBO | 6 |
| Bessie | Movie | HBO | 5 |
| Transparent | Comedy | Amazon | 5 |
| Wolf Hall | Limited | PBS | 5 |
| Better Call Saul | Drama | AMC | 4 |
| The Honorable Woman | Limited | Sundance TV | 4 |
| House of Cards | Drama | Netflix | 4 |
| Inside Amy Schumer | Variety Sketch | Comedy Central | 4 |
| Louie | Comedy | FX | 4 |
| The Colbert Report | Variety Talk | Comedy Central | 3 |
| The Daily Show with Jon Stewart | Variety Talk | Comedy Central | 3 |
| Downton Abbey | Drama | PBS | 3 |
| Homeland | Drama | Showtime | 3 |
| Key & Peele | Variety Sketch | Comedy Central | 3 |
| The Last Man on Earth | Comedy | Fox | 3 |
| Modern Family | Comedy | ABC | 3 |
| Silicon Valley | Comedy | HBO | 3 |
| Unbreakable Kimmy Schmidt | Comedy | Netflix | 3 |
| Bloodline | Drama | Netflix | 2 |
| Episodes | Comedy | Showtime | 2 |
| The Good Wife | Drama | CBS | 2 |
| Houdini | Limited | History | 2 |
| Last Week Tonight with John Oliver | Variety Talk | HBO | 2 |
| Late Show with David Letterman | Variety Talk | CBS | 2 |
| Orange Is the New Black | Drama | Netflix | 2 |
| Parks and Recreation | Comedy | NBC | 2 |
| Saturday Night Live | Variety Sketch | NBC | 2 |
| The Tonight Show Starring Jimmy Fallon | Variety Talk | NBC | 2 |

== Most major awards ==
Networks with multiple major awards
| Network | No. of Awards |
|---|---|
| HBO | 14 |
| Comedy Central | 4 |
| ABC | 2 |
| Amazon | 2 |

Programs with multiple major awards
| Program | Category | Network | No. of Awards |
|---|---|---|---|
| Olive Kitteridge | Limited | HBO | 6 |
| Game of Thrones | Drama | HBO | 4 |
| Veep | Comedy | HBO | 4 |
| The Daily Show with Jon Stewart | Variety Talk | Comedy Central | 3 |
| Transparent | Comedy | Amazon | 2 |

== Presenters and performers ==
The awards were presented by the following:

=== Presenters ===
| Name(s) | Role |
|---|---|
| Amy Poehler; Amy Schumer | Presenters of the award for Outstanding Supporting Actress in a Comedy Series |
| Anthony Anderson; Tracee Ellis Ross | Presenters of the award for Outstanding Writing for a Comedy Series |
| Ricky Gervais | Presenter of the award for Outstanding Supporting Actor in a Comedy Series |
| Gina Rodriguez; John Stamos | Introducers of Outstanding Guest Actor in a Comedy Series winner Bradley Whitford and Outstanding Guest Actress in a Comedy Series winner Joan Cusack |
| Joan Cusack; Bradley Whitford | Presenters of the award for Outstanding Directing for a Comedy Series |
| Jimmy Kimmel | Presenter of the award for Outstanding Lead Actor in a Comedy Series |
| Seth Meyers | Presenter of the award for Outstanding Lead Actress in a Comedy Series |
| Keegan-Michael Key; Jordan Peele | Presenters of the award for Outstanding Reality-Competition Program |
| James Corden | Presenter of the accountants from Ernst & Young |
| Taraji P. Henson; Terrence Howard | Presenters of the awards for Outstanding Writing for a Limited Series, Movie or Dramatic Special and Outstanding Supporting Actress in a Limited Series or Movie |
| John Oliver | Presenter of the award for Outstanding Directing for a Limited Series, Movie or Dramatic Special |
| Maggie Gyllenhaal; Liev Schreiber | Presenters of the award for Outstanding Supporting Actor in a Limited Series or Movie |
| Rob Lowe; Kerry Washington | Presenters of the award for Outstanding Lead Actress in a Limited Series or Movie |
| Lady Gaga | Presenter of the award for Outstanding Lead Actor in a Limited Series or Movie |
| Fred Savage | Presenter of a special presentation paying tribute to series ending in the 2014–15 TV season |
| Marcia Gay Harden; Lena Headey | Presenters of the award for Outstanding Limited Series |
| Mindy Kaling; Zachary Levi | Presenters of the award for Outstanding Writing for a Variety Series |
| Jane Lynch; Eric Stonestreet | Presenters of the award for Outstanding Variety Sketch Series |
| Will Forte; Colin Hanks | Presenters of the award for Outstanding Directing for a Variety Series |
| LL Cool J | Presenter of the award for Outstanding Variety Talk Series |
| Jaimie Alexander; Ben McKenzie | Introducers of Outstanding Guest Actor in a Drama Series winner Reg E. Cathey |
| Reg E. Cathey | Presenter of the award for Outstanding Writing for a Drama Series |
| Jamie Lee Curtis; Emma Roberts | Presenters of the awards for Outstanding Supporting Actress in a Drama Series and Outstanding Directing for a Drama Series |
| Viola Davis | Presenter of the award for Outstanding Supporting Actor in a Drama Series |
| Tina Fey | Presenter of the award for Outstanding Lead Actor in a Drama Series |
| Adrien Brody | Presenter of the award for Outstanding Lead Actress in a Drama Series |
| Mel Brooks | Presenter of the award for Outstanding Comedy Series |
| Tracy Morgan | Presenter of the award for Outstanding Drama Series |

=== Performers ===
| Name(s) | Performed |
|---|---|
| Andy Samberg; Will Forte | "I Watched Every Show!" |
| Eva Cassidy | "Over the Rainbow" |

== In Memoriam ==
The In Memoriam segment featured the song "Over the Rainbow" by Eva Cassidy:

- Mike Nichols
- Polly Bergen
- Jerry Weintraub
- B. B. King
- Wes Craven
- Gary Owens
- Clark Terry
- Anne Meara
- Taylor Negron
- Jack Rollins
- Martin Milner
- Bud Yorkin
- Stuart Scott
- Brandon Stoddard
- Merv Adelson
- Bob Simon
- Patrick Macnee
- Harris Wittels
- Glen A. Larson
- Stan Freberg
- James Best
- Jenna McMahon
- Harve Bennett
- Ed Sabol
- Ann Marcus
- Joan Rivers
- Ernest Kinoy
- Marty Pasetta
- Gilbert Lewis
- Albert Maysles
- Sam Simon
- Jack Carter
- Dick Van Patten
- Ian Fraser
- Jan Hooks
- Elizabeth Peña
- Howard Lipstone
- Frank Gifford
- Judy Carne
- Ray Charles
- Rod Taylor
- Donna Douglas
- Richard Dysart
- Joseph Sargent
- Edward Herrmann
- Jayne Meadows
- Alex Rocco
- Dean Jones
- Leonard Nimoy
