= Bontecou =

Bontecou is a surname. Notable people with the surname include:

- Eleanor Bontecou (1891–1976), American lawyer, civil rights advocate, and government official
- Frederic H. Bontecou (1893–1959), American farmer and politician
- Lee Bontecou (1931–2022), American artist
- Reed Brockway Bontecou (1824–1907), American Civil War surgeon

== See also ==
- Bontekoe
