= Start Calling Me Dad =

- The Knick episode
- Episode no.: Season 1 Episode 6
- Directed by: Steven Soderbergh
- Written by: Jack Amiel; Michael Begler
- Cinematography by: Peter Andrews (Note: Pseudonym for Steven Soderbergh.)
- Editing by: Mary Ann Bernard
- Original release date: September 19, 2014
- Running time: 54 minutes

Guest appearances
- Jennifer Ferrin as Abigail Alford; Melissa McMeekin as Mary Mallon; Tom Lipinski as Phillip Showalter; Tom Papa as Luff; Reg Rogers as Dr. Bertram Chickering, Sr.; Gary Simpson as Hobart Showalter; Sam Cohen as Fraternity Brother; Antwayn Hopper as Woodson; Collin Meath as Phinny Sears; Andrew David Rabensteine as Bellevue Doctor; Alfred "Ice" Cole as Prize Fighter; Annika Franklin as Pregnant Woman; Allison Guinn as Nurse; Brittney Lee Hamilton as Bellevue Nurse; Ghana Leigh as Miss Odom; Ying Ying Li as Lin-Lin; Pei Pei Lin as Delores; Leopold Manswell as Hiram; Isaiah Seward as Bar Patron; Yelena Shmulenson as Relative; Zuzanna Szadkowski as Nurse Pell; Bjorn Thorstad as Photographer

Episode chronology
← Previous "They Capture the Heat"	Next → "Get the Rope"

"Start Calling Me Dad" is the sixth episode of the American medical period drama television series The Knick. The episode was written by series creators Jack Amiel and Michael Begler, and directed by executive producer Steven Soderbergh. It originally aired on Cinemax on September 19, 2014.

The series is set in New York City in the early twentieth century and follows the staff of the Knickerbocker Hospital (the Knick), who struggle against the limitations of medical understanding and practice. The protagonist is Dr. John Thackery, the new leader of the surgery staff, who balances his cocaine and opium addictions against his ambition for medical discovery and his reputation among his peers. In the episode, Thackery works in a new method for placenta praevia, while he also discovers Edwards' clinic.

According to Nielsen Media Research, the episode was seen by an estimated 0.358 million household viewers and gained a 0.11 ratings share among adults aged 18–49. The episode received extremely positive reviews from critics, who praised the storylines, performances and writing.

== Plot ==
At night, Chickering (Michael Angarano) is called to the Knick by Thackery (Clive Owen). Thackery wants to learn more about placenta praevia, and how to do a faster surgery. He may have come up with a new method, and wants to employ it in two prostitutes despite the fact that none are pregnant.

Tragedy strikes Gallinger (Eric Johnson) and his wife, Eleanor, when their baby dies from meningitis. After the funeral, Sister Harriet (Cara Seymour) suggests they could adopt if they want. Meanwhile, health department inspector Jacob Speight (David Fierro) works with Cornelia (Juliet Rylance) in identifying the cause of the recent typhoid outbreak among the socialites. They eventually trace it to an Irish immigrant cook named Mary Mallon, and force her into checking into the Knick.

Barrow (Jeremy Bobb) is introduced to the X-ray machine. He convinces the owner, Mr. Luff (Tom Papa), in giving it for a lower price. Luff also tries to get Thackery involved in a business, only to be angrily rejected. Thackery later performs a placenta praevia surgery with his new method, which proves to be a success and saves the woman and baby's life. Thackery names it to credit himself, Chickering and the late Christiansen, intending to write a paper.

Thackery discovers the clinic that Edwards (André Holland) was hiding in the basement. Angry, he shuts it down and reprimands Edwards for violating many protocols. However, Thackery is impressed that Edwards has created a new way of operating on hernias. Edwards agrees to allow the method to be used, as long as he can co-author a paper with Thackery and be given the position of deputy chief of surgery. Thackery easily accepts all of his requests, finally accepting him in the Knick. That night, Cornelia returns home to tell Phillip (Tom Lipinski) and his family about her actions. While alone in the bedroom, she is approached by Phillip's father, Hobart, who makes sexually suggestive comments at her.

== Production ==
=== Development ===
In August 2014, Cinemax announced that the sixth episode of the season would be titled "Start Calling Me Dad", and that it would be written by series creators Jack Amiel and Michael Begler, and directed by executive producer Steven Soderbergh. This was Amiel's fifth writing credit, Begler's fifth writing credit, and Soderbergh's sixth directing credit.

== Reception ==
=== Viewers ===
In its original American broadcast, "Start Calling Me Dad" was seen by an estimated 0.358 million household viewers with a 0.11 in the 18-49 demographics. This means that 0.11 percent of all households with televisions watched the episode. This was a slight increase in viewership from the previous episode, which was watched by an estimated 0.322 million household viewers with a 0.06 in the 18-49 demographics.

=== Critical reviews ===
"Start Calling Me Dad" received extremely positive reviews from critics. The review aggregator website Rotten Tomatoes reported an 80% approval rating for the episode, based on 10 reviews. The site's consensus states: "'Start Calling Me Dad' ties up a couple of story arcs and explores some distressing themes, resulting in a dark and twisty but ultimately engaging episode."

Matt Fowler of IGN gave the episode a "great" 8.5 out of 10 and wrote in his verdict, "'Start Calling Me Dad' switched the story up a bit by ending a couple of threads (C-Sections, Typhoid) and starting a few news ones. Cornelia's situation, though certainly disappointing for her in some aspects to begin with, has now become a vile trap. And she'll now have to come face to face with despicable, perverted behavior that her life has probably, for the most part, shielded her from. And Thackery, now riding a bit of a genius high, has taken Edwards into the fold as a fellow adventurer. Though there are still four episodes left in Season 1, it feels like these two stories might take us through to the end."

Brandon Nowalk of The A.V. Club gave the episode an "A–" grade and wrote, "Why does 'Start Calling Me Dad' end with that scene? It's such a funny, exciting, sad hour — the most I've felt watching The Knick since the premiere — but then the final scene leaves us with a sense of intense revulsion and the title takes that feeling and applies it to the whole episode."

Debbie Day of Entertainment Weekly wrote, "Thackery extends a hand: 'Dr. Edwards, may I officially welcome you to the Knick?' Finally. Score one for Edwards. Let's hope it sticks." Keith Uhlich of Vulture gave the episode a 2 star rating out of 5 and wrote, "'Start Calling Me Dad,' the sixth installment of the first season of Cinemax's The Knick, is all plot, akin to watching chess pieces moving around the board, readying a future attack. There can be suspense in this kind of storytelling, but the episode feels more like housecleaning for the inelegant way it resolves certain narrative threads while awkwardly setting up others."

Mike Hale of The New York Times wrote, "As a counterweight to the episode's medical triumphs, a running dark joke was made of the enthusiasm over the hospital's new X-ray machine, which the thrifty Barrow bought secondhand. Everyone who saw the device wanted to try it out, and Barrow himself insisted on an image of his head — which meant having his unprotected brain bombarded with X-rays for an hour." Steve MacFarlane of Slant Magazine wrote, "Even though Gallinger is the closest The Knick has had to an outright villain, director Steven Soderbergh's handling of the meningitis case is both technically and dramatically virtuoso, inverting audience's sympathies if only by placing the couple in a position which, by today's standards, nobody should ever have to go through."

Gerri Mahn of Den of Geek a perfect 5 star rating out of 5 and wrote, "I am delighted to report that in the last episode of The Knick, everything went to hell. That means in this episode, we get to see the characters burn." Robert Ham of Paste gave the episode an 8.9 out of 10 and wrote, "Still, now that we are deep into the storylines of all these characters, this episode feels like a perfect step forward for the series. Even with the occasionally shaky writing, they are making it very hard to turn away from this singular show."
