= Frank Deal =

American actor (born 1958)

Frank Deal (born October 7, 1958) is an American actor known for his roles in film, TV, and theatre. In addition to acting and directing, Deal taught theatre at The Juilliard School, Yale School of Drama, and New York University's Tisch School of the Arts. TV credits include recurring roles on Manifest, Gypsy, The Americans, and Law & Order: Special Victims Unit. Broadway credits include the original production of Tracy Letts, August: Osage County. B.A. Duke. M.F.A. NYU's Tisch School of the Arts.

== Filmography ==
=== Film ===
Year	Title	Role	Notes
1998	Aphrodisiac	Bishop Martin	
2000	The Doghouse	Jamey	
2006	Flannel Pajamas	Gregory	
2006	The House Is Burning	Insurance Man	
2007	Body/Antibody	Andy	
2008	Able Danger	O'Rourke	
2008	Deception	Police Officer	
2012	The Bourne Legacy	C-Team	
2012	The Bay	Mayor Stockman	
2013	Stand Clear of the Closing Doors	Principal	
2014	Non-Stop	Charles Wheeler	
2014	The Amazing Spider-Man 2	Agent Berkley	
2015	Black Dog, Red Dog	State Trooper	
2016	Manhattan Night	Walden Campbell	
2018	Eighth Grade	Officer Todd	
2018	Wildling	Chief Physician	
2019	Before You Know It	Bill (Director)	
2020	Algorithm: BLISS	Kirwin	

=== Television ===
Year	Title	Role	Notes
1999–2014	Law & Order: Special Victims Unit	Various role	8 episodes
2001	The Sopranos	R&D #1	Episode: "Mr. Ruggerio's Neighborhood"
2001	Ed	Russ	Episode: "Mind Over Matter"
2001	The Education of Max Bickford	Wilhelm Struyk	Episode: "Herding Cats"
2002	Third Watch	Vince Weathers	Episode: "Ladies' Day"
2002, 2006	Law & Order	Don Balderston / Earl Webster	2 episodes
2005	Taylor Made	Carl Taylor	Television film
2008	Fringe	Bank Manager Grimes	Episode: "Safe"
2010	One Life to Live	Mr. Stein	Episode #1.10781
2011	Nurse Jackie	Dr. Herfert	Episode: "Fuck the Lemurs"
2011	Unforgettable	Surgeon	Episode: "Heroes"
2011	Onion News Network	Steve Patterson	Episode: "Brooke vs O'Brady"
2012	Person of Interest	Doug Stanley	Episode: "Super"
2012	Blue Bloods	Det. Batalli	Episode: "Some Kind of Hero"
2012	Royal Pains	Bartender	Episode: "Manimal"
2012	Boardwalk Empire	Mr. Franklin Shearer	Episode: "Blue Bell Boy"
2012	The Corrections	Science Fair Principal	Television film
2012	Elementary	Detective Mike Muldoon	Episode: "The Woman"
2013	Hostages	John Norton	Episode: "Burden of Truth"
2014	Alpha House	Teddy Bungemack	Episode: "In the Saddle"
2014	The Blacklist	David Fisher	Episode: "Ivan (No. 88)"
2014	Red Oaks	Skip	Episode: "Pilot"
2014	The Knick	Sargeant	Episode: "Get the Rope"
2014	Gotham	Dr. Felton	Episode: "The Mask"
2015–2016	The Americans	Isaac Breland	4 episodes
2016	Next Big Thing	Dr. Plah	Television film
2016	Conviction	Stan Sowinski	Episode: "Dropping Bombs"
2017	Better Call Saul	Parks Supervisor	2 episodes
2017	Gypsy	Gary Levine	7 episodes
2018	Escape at Dannemora	Corrections Officer Frank	Episode: "Part 4"
2018–2022	Manifest	Capt. Bill Daly	7 episodes
2019	Tales of the City	Sargeant	Episode: "Days of Small Surrenders"
2020	The Outsider	Fred Peterson	2 episodes
2020	Your Honor	Warden Ross	Episode: "Part Three"
