= They Capture the Heat =

- The Knick episode
- Episode no.: Season 1 Episode 5
- Directed by: Steven Soderbergh
- Written by: Steven Katz
- Cinematography by: Peter Andrews (Note: Pseudonym for Steven Soderbergh.)
- Editing by: Mary Ann Bernard
- Original release date: September 12, 2014
- Running time: 48 minutes

Guest appearances
- La Tonya Borsay as Evaline Edwards; Helene Coxe as; Danny Hoch as Bunky Collier; Brian Kerwin as Corky Vanderbilt; Rachel Korine as Junia; Edwin Lugo as Ernesto Mendieta; Peter Maloney as Drunk Barber; Collin Meath as Phinny Sears; Frank Wood as Mr. Havershorn; Happy Anderson as Jimmy; Michael Berresse as Parke-Davis Representative; Lucas Papaelias as Eldon Pouncey; Richard James Porter as Monsignor Joseph Mills Lawlor; Suzanne Savoy as Victoria Robertson; Allen Warnock as Clarence Dally; Brittany Bellizeare as Millicent; Grant Chang as Mr. Sung; Caroline Clay as Miss Manx; Kevin T. Collins as Waiter; Ylfa Edelstein as Nurse Baker; Bonita Hamilton as Mrs. Gamble; Ryan Homchick as Orderly Schleif; Danya LaBelle as Mrs. Lefkowitz; Ghana Leigh as Miss Odom; Christopher Brian Roach as Collier's Man; Kate Simmons as Alice; Jing Xu as Mrs. Sung

Episode chronology
← Previous "Where's the Dignity?"	Next → "Start Calling Me Dad"

"They Capture the Heat" is the fifth episode of the American medical period drama television series The Knick. The episode was written by Steven Katz, and directed by executive producer Steven Soderbergh. It originally aired on Cinemax on September 12, 2014.

The series is set in New York City in the early twentieth century and follows the staff of the Knickerbocker Hospital (the Knick), who struggle against the limitations of medical understanding and practice. The protagonist is Dr. John Thackery, the new leader of the surgery staff, who balances his cocaine and opium addictions against his ambition for medical discovery and his reputation among his peers. In the episode, Barrow finds a way to reduce his debt, while the Knick asks to get X-ray machines for their benefit.

According to Nielsen Media Research, the episode was seen by an estimated 0.322 million household viewers and gained a 0.06 ratings share among adults aged 18–49. The episode received positive reviews from critics, who praised the performances and character development.

== Plot ==
Collier (Danny Hoch) brings a wounded familiar to Barrow (Jeremy Bobb), asking for his help. Barrow then delivers the person to the Knick so Thackery (Clive Owen) can operate him. Edwards (André Holland) is also tasked in operating, despite Collier's protest. Collier agrees to lower Barrow's debt, but threatens to kill everyone if the surgery fails. Despite difficulties, the surgery proves to be successful.

The Knick is introduced to Thomas Edison's X-ray machine. Although Cornelia (Juliet Rylance) is impressed, the Robertsons are reluctant with the costs needed. Barrow dines with August (Grainger Hines) to convince him in funding it, who maintains his position. However, realizing that a friend of his has already donated two X-ray machines to a Manhattan hospital, August accepts in getting a machine for the Knick. Barrow also uses a police friend, Phineas "Phinny" Sears (Collin Heath), to make a new deal with Collier; Collier can use a police uniform to force any prostitute to have sex with him for free, with each use costing a lower debt for Barrow. At Chinatown, Cleary (Chris Sullivan) and Sister Harriet (Cara Seymour) perform many abortions.

Edwards is informed by Cornelia that his mother is experiencing severe pains. When he arrives at Robertsons' house, he finds Thackery already tending her. Thackery employs an aggressive approach to help her, which saves her. Later, the Knick receives a new case of placenta praevia, which worries Chickering (Michael Angarano) due to Christiansen's surgery. Thackery manages to complete the surgery in 72 seconds, something they have not achieved before. Opening up more, Thackery decides to try to ride a bike for the first time, with Elkins (Eve Hewson) helping him.

== Production ==
=== Development ===
In August 2014, Cinemax announced that the fifth episode of the season would be titled "They Capture the Heat", and that it would be written by Steven Katz, and directed by executive producer Steven Soderbergh. This was Katz's first writing credit, and Soderbergh's fifth directing credit.

== Reception ==
=== Viewers ===
In its original American broadcast, "They Capture the Heat" was seen by an estimated 0.322 million household viewers with a 0.06 in the 18-49 demographics. This means that 0.06 percent of all households with televisions watched the episode. This was a 14% decrease in viewership from the previous episode, which was watched by an estimated 0.374 million household viewers with a 0.13 in the 18-49 demographics.

=== Critical reviews ===
"They Capture the Heat" received positive reviews from critics. The review aggregator website Rotten Tomatoes reported an 80% approval rating for the episode, based on 10 reviews. The site's consensus states: "'They Capture the Heat' focuses on largely separate storylines, but it succeeds in moving the season forward and setting up potential future intrigue."

Matt Fowler of IGN gave the episode a "great" 8.3 out of 10 and wrote in his verdict, "The Knick continued to build up the relationship (ever so slowly) between Thackery and Edwards this week while making dangerous moves to connect Barrow's criminal connections to the hospital. The surgical failings of the elusive C-section returned and the 'uppercrust' typhoid fever mystery continued to hover. The opening scene, featuring Collier coming close to shooting Thackery, Edwards, and Barrow was the most heightened 'TV' thing this series done so far, but it still worked. And while Robertson might want to see his daughter Cornelia married off to Thackery, it seems like Nurse Elkins currently has the good doctor's attention."

Brandon Nowalk of The A.V. Club gave the episode a "B+" grade and wrote, "More than ever, my reaction to watching 'They Capture The Heat' is that the characters moved another inch. But Thack's the one who stares out at the abyss."

Debbie Day of Entertainment Weekly wrote, "Despite our decidedly pro-Knick stance up to now, if ever there was an episode in this series so far that stubbornly refused to congeal, 'They Capture the Heat' seems it. Too much stuck when the ideas were thrown at the wall." Keith Uhlich of Vulture gave the episode a 4 star rating out of 5 and wrote, "In other words, use art as counterpoise to life. The material and the immaterial exist in tandem, and, often, are thrown out of whack. But how wonderful it is when they harmonize, however fleetingly."

Mike Hale of The New York Times wrote, "It was a humiliating moment for the proud black doctor. But on the other side of the dramatic ledger, when the Captain, in conversation with Thackery, remarked on the heat, Thackery repeated Edwards's comment about the tall buildings — a bit of theft and an unconscious sign of respect." Steve MacFarlane of Slant Magazine wrote, "It's been a pleasure watching Steven Soderbergh stress Thackery and Algernon's unspoken shifts in opinion of one another, and 'They Capture the Heat' skirts it on the margins." Robert Ham of Paste gave the episode an 8.3 out of 10 and wrote, "Heavy handed though it was, it moved things forward appreciably and left the door open to what could be some fiery dramatics in the weeks to come."
