= Get the Rope =

- The Knick episode
- Episode no.: Season 1 Episode 7
- Directed by: Steven Soderbergh
- Written by: Jack Amiel; Michael Begler
- Cinematography by: Peter Andrews (Note: Pseudonym for Steven Soderbergh.)
- Editing by: Mary Ann Bernard
- Original release date: September 26, 2014
- Running time: 43 minutes

Guest appearances
- Mary Birdsong as Fionnula Sears; Michael Cerveris as Dr. William Halsted; Frank Deal as Sergeant; Rachel Korine as Junia; Collin Meath as Phinny Sears; Stephen Tyrone Williams as Dr. Moses Williams; Robert Hneleski as Cop; Lucas Papaelias as Eldon Pouncey; Erin Wilhelmi as Lottie; Perry Yung as Ping Wu; Sawyer Barth as The Whispering Kid; Ashley Bryant as Infirmary Nurse; Joe Casey as Guy #1; Ylfa Edelstein as Nurse Baker; Martin Ewens as Mr. Whitman; Jim Ford as Guy #2; Antwayn Hopper as Woodson; Stephen Izzi as Rioter; Isaiah Johnson as Stabber; Ghana Leigh as Miss Odom; Ying Ying Li as Lin-Lin; Pei Pei Lin as Delores; Ras Enoch McCurdie as Man; Markita Prescott as May Harris; Nick Reynolds as White Man #5; Eric Reid Schroeder as White Guy in Mob; Zuzanna Szadkowski as Nurse Pell; Rennel Turner as Jamison; Katy Wright-Mead as Jenny Sears

Episode chronology
← Previous "Start Calling Me Dad"	Next → "Working Late a Lot"

"Get the Rope" is the seventh episode of the American medical period drama television series The Knick. The episode was written by series creators Jack Amiel and Michael Begler, and directed by executive producer Steven Soderbergh. It originally aired on Cinemax on September 26, 2014.

The series is set in New York City in the early twentieth century and follows the staff of the Knickerbocker Hospital (the Knick), who struggle against the limitations of medical understanding and practice. The protagonist is Dr. John Thackery, the new leader of the surgery staff, who balances his cocaine and opium addictions against his ambition for medical discovery and his reputation among his peers. In the episode, officer Sears is stabbed by an African-American in self-defense, prompting a mob of rioters to gather outside the Knick.

According to Nielsen Media Research, the episode was seen by an estimated 0.358 million household viewers and gained a 0.11 ratings share among adults aged 18–49. The episode received critical acclaim, with critics praising the directing, performances, writing, character development and themes.

== Plot ==
=== Flashback ===
Dr. William Halsted (Michael Cerveris) visits the Knick to converse with Christiansen (Matt Frewer) and Thackery (Clive Owen), with the latter presented as his apprentice. Halsted wants them to perform in front of a board to explain their methods for future generations. Thackery is worried about their incoming surgery, as he feels he hasn't mastered it yet. Christiansen also surprises the attendees by mentioning that he considered that removing organs will help in their appendicitis surgery.

=== Main story ===
Officer Sears (Collin Meath) approaches an African-American woman in the street, mistaking her for a prostitute. The woman's boyfriend then fights Sears, with Sears stabbed and the couple fleeing the scene. He is taken to the Knick, where Thackery, Gallinger (Eric Johnson) and Chickering (Michael Angarano) treat him. Sears' mother, Fionnula (Mary Birdsong), demands that the man be killed for stabbing him. Outside, a mob of people have gathered outside, demanding justice for the stabbing.

Sears' condition worsens as he starts vomiting blood, result of an internal bleeding. Thackery tries to save him, but Sears dies. A devastated Fionnula goes outside to tell the mob that her son is dead, demanding that they kill every single African-American for it. As many African-Americans are attacked in the streets, the Knick locks the doors, while Thackery tells Edwards (André Holland) to hide. The man who stabbed Sears also hides in the Knick, angering the mob, who try to make their way inside. Thackery decides to move the staff to Edwards' underground clinic, as the mob enters the building.

Gallinger and Barrow (Jeremy Bobb) express disdain upon discovering the clinic used many of their equipment, as well as Thackery's knowledge. To help the rest of the African-Americans, Sister Harriet (Cara Seymour) suggests taking some of them to a nearby monastery, but the staff still needs to take some of them to a hospital. However, the vehicles are not at their disposal, as the mob stole the horses. In order to get the patients to a nearby hospital, Thackery and the staff are forced to deliver them on foot, covering the patients with blankets.

At the hospital, Thackery, Edwards, Cornelia (Juliet Rylance) and Elkins (Eve Hewson) help the staff with their patients. That night, as the riots have ended, they return to the Knick, which was ravaged from outside. Edwards and Cornelia are surprised to discover that Edwards' clinic was not affected in the slighted, and the latter is fascinated by Edwards' determination. Their conversation turns flirtatious, culminating with a kiss. Thackery accompanies Elkins home and accepts her invitation to enter, where they have sex. The next morning, Elkins finds that they used cocaine last night. Her roommate arrives and asks what happened, but Elkins just laughs.

== Production ==
=== Development ===
In August 2014, Cinemax announced that the seventh episode of the season would be titled "Get the Rope", and that it would be written by series creators Jack Amiel and Michael Begler, and directed by executive producer Steven Soderbergh. This was Amiel's sixth writing credit, Begler's sixth writing credit, and Soderbergh's seventh directing credit.

== Reception ==
=== Viewers ===
In its original American broadcast, "Get the Rope" was seen by an estimated 0.358 million household viewers with a 0.12 in the 18-49 demographics. This means that 0.12 percent of all households with televisions watched the episode. This was even in viewership from the previous episode, which was watched by an estimated 0.358 million household viewers with a 0.11 in the 18-49 demographics.

=== Critical reviews ===
"Get the Rope" received critical acclaim. The review aggregator website Rotten Tomatoes reported an 91% approval rating for the episode, based on 11 reviews. The site's consensus states: "In The Knick's most explosive outing yet, racial tensions come to a head, and the episode's nimble handling of a singular stressful event is gripping and provocative."

Matt Fowler of IGN gave the episode an "amazing" 9 out of 10 and wrote in his verdict, "As the mob in 'Get the Rope' became more and more violent, and then started threatening to bust through the doors, I wondered 'How will everyone react to this?' It was - for me - the show's first full 'oh s***!' moment. And with everything we'd seen from everyone at The Knick so far, one might have assumed they'd all be in huge trouble given the level of their conflict and in-fighting. But not only did they respond with intelligence, they put their own lives in jeopardy to save their patients. It was an ugly episode that was also extremely satisfying, if that makes sense."

Brandon Nowalk of The A.V. Club gave the episode an "A" grade and wrote, "It's easy to get swept up in 'Get The Rope' is what I'm saying, and as an emergency episode it succeeds wildly. The plot keeps moving from one problem to the next, then branches into various little problems. Six episodes of charting the system really pays off. We get the chains of command, the geography of the Knick, the connections among characters in- and outside. As soon as we hear the rumor about prostitutes being assaulted in the streets, we know exactly what's going through Barrow's mind."

Debbie Day of Entertainment Weekly wrote, "Every now and again, television throws an episode at viewers that we can only discuss in hushed, reverent tones — there will be no levity when speaking of 'Get the Rope,' because the idiocy of racial politics in the time in which Steven Soderbergh's medical drama is set is no laughing matter." Keith Uhlich of Vulture gave the episode a perfect 5 star rating out of 5 and wrote, "Happily, I come here not to pan, but to praise. As if atoning for last week's dithering, 'Get the Rope' is as perfect — in form, function and spirit — as Soderbergh gets. (And all due credit to my usual punching bags, writers Jack Amiel and Michael Begler, for providing an impeccable blueprint.)"

Mike Hale of The New York Times wrote, "Maybe Steven Soderbergh was in a hurry when he made 'Get the Rope,' Friday night's episode of The Knick — it clocked in at a tidy 41 minutes, about 10 minutes shorter than usual. Or maybe he just wanted to leave well enough alone, knowing that he'd achieved a small tour de force." Steve MacFarlane of Slant Magazine wrote, "Steven Soderbergh's naturalism has worked both for and against certain strains in The Knick's first season, and 'Get the Rope' may mark the first time his dazzling, inventive shooting style just can't support the dramaturgy."

Gerri Mahn of Den of Geek a perfect 5 star rating out of 5 and wrote, "Shit. You know it's going to be a tough night when a show that highlights the grotesqueries of turn of the century race relations, calls the episode 'Get the Rope.' Then again, every episode of The Knick is rough." Robert Ham of Paste gave the episode an 8.6 out of 10 and wrote, "The unsteady social conscience and occasionally junky scripts for The Knick have provided viewers with quite a bumpy ride over these past seven weeks. But the one important, unruffled force keeping this show from collapsing into a heap has been director Steven Soderbergh."
