= Medical photography =

Photographic documentation of medical subjects

Medical photography is a specialized area of photography that concerns itself with the documentation of the clinical presentation of patients, medical and surgical procedures, medical devices and specimens from autopsy. The practice requires a high level of technical skill to present the photograph free from misleading information that may cause misinterpretation. The photographs are used in clinical documentation, research, publication in scientific journals and teaching.

== The profession ==
=== Employment ===
Medical photographers document patients at various stages of an illness, injuries and before and after surgical procedures. They record the work of healthcare professionals to assist in the planning of treatment and education of the public and other healthcare professionals. The nature of the work requires a respect for and sensitivity to people, an awareness of sterile procedures and an adherence to privacy legislation and policies.

The BioCommunications Association, in a survey commissioned in 2008 of individuals working in medical photography, found that most medical photographers are employed by university affiliated hospitals and research centers. Ten percent were freelancers working in specialty clinics such as dermatology, ophthalmology and plastic surgery. A few of these provided services to the medical-legal profession. Medical photographers photograph patients in clinics, wards and in operating rooms. They may also be called to photograph an autopsy and gross specimens in the pathology department. Specialized photography techniques using photomacrography and ultra-violet and fluorescence photography may also be used. The role of the medical photographer has changed over the years from being exclusively medical to incorporating more general photography of a commercial or editorial nature to support public relations and education. Video production is playing an increased role; medical photographers are often responsible for video conferencing from operating rooms and are involved in tele-medicine. Departments employing medical photographers tend to number five people or less. Some medical photographers specialize in areas such as ophthalmology and dermatology.

=== Education and training ===
Most medical photographers have a degree in photography from a college or university and frequently have a degree in the sciences. They need to have a detailed understanding of photographic and optical principles, and also understand the technical requirements of a particular job in order select or modify equipment. Knowledge of digital imaging software is necessary to edit and output images while maintaining scale and color balance.

An interest in science and medicine are important. A basic knowledge of anatomy and physiology coupled with a working knowledge of medical terminology is required in order to discuss the photographic needs with medical staff and other healthcare providers. Because they are working with patients, medical photographers must have the manners and sensitivity to make patients comfortable while being photographed. They must also be aware of the laws governing privacy and copyright.

== History ==
The scientists were quick to realize the merits of photography because of its perceived ability to present an objective image of what was seen. This solved a problem of representation by artists who were asked to produce illustrations only from description or highly influenced by the interpretation of physicians and surgeons. The first application of photography in medicine appears in 1840 when Alfred François Donné of the Charité Hospital in Paris photographed sections of bones and teeth. He began making daguerreotypes through a microscope. Donné published engravings made from photographs by his student Léon Foucault. Hugh Welch Diamond, a physician and founding member of the Royal Photographic Society, used photography as a tool in medicine, particularly in the field of mental illness. He was working in the women's section of the Surrey County Asylum in Twickenham in 1852, where he attempted to create a catalog of visual signs of insanity by photographing the patients and organizing the photographs by symptom. Guillaume-Benjamin Duchenne de Boulogne began photographing inmates in the Salpêtrière mental hospital in Paris in 1856. He devised a method for activating individual muscles of the face through electronic stimulation. With the assistance of Adrien Tournachon, brother of Felix Nadar, he photographed facial expressions and at one point listed 53 emotions that could be identified based on the muscular action. His work was published in 1862 in Mécanisme de la physionomie humaine in what was the most remarkable of all photographically illustrated books in medical science prior to 1900.

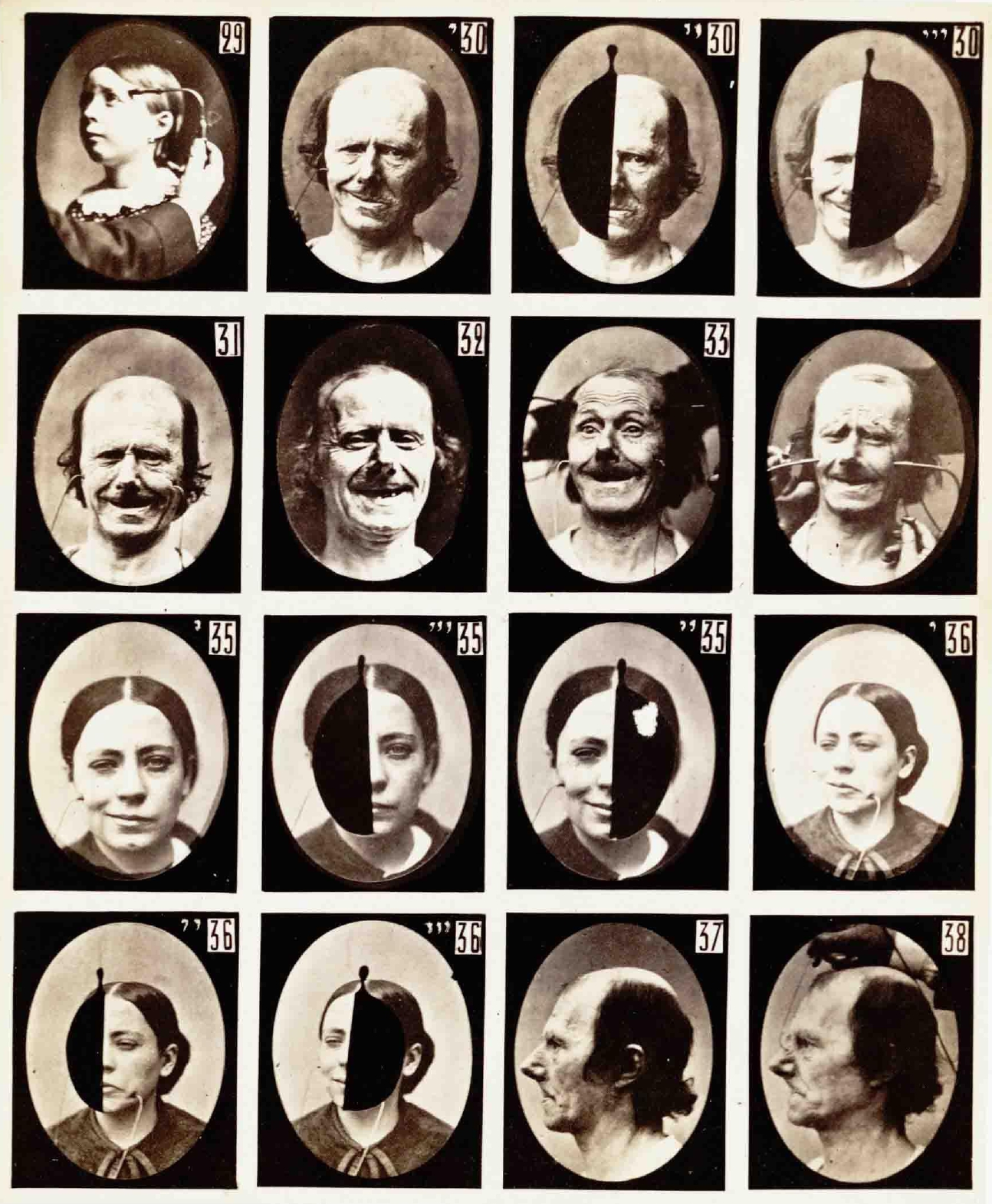
G.-B. Duchanne de Boulogne, Synoptic plate 4 from Le Mécanisme de la Physionomie Humaine. 1862, albumen print. In the upper row and the lower two rows, patients with different expressions on either side of their faces

Dr. Jean-Martin Charcot, a student of Duchenne de Boulogne, believed like Diamond that photographs would play a significant role in the diagnosis and management of patients. A medical photography unit was established at Salpêtrière hospital in Paris in 1878 by Charcot. He hired Albert Londe who worked at Salpêtrière under Charcot's supervision. Londe was to not only make photographs but to create new apparatus to record signs and symptoms. Charcot began publishing Nouvelle iconographie de la Salpêtriere in 1888 that used photographs to show clinical presentations of cases at Salpêtrière. Londe published a major reference on the practice of medical photography La Photographie médicale. in 1893. Londe developed a systematic method for photographing patients in fixed views that took into account depth of field and distortion caused by lens design and lens to subject distance.

There was growing interest in cultures and peoples in distant regions of the globe and photography was a way to place them under study especially when combined with influences from the study of phrenology and Darwin's work on natural selection. In 1850, Joseph T. Zealy (1812–93) was commissioned by Louis Agassiz to make daguerreotypes of plantation workers of African origin in the southern United States of America. The pictures were intended as scientific documentation to support theories of ethnology. Carl Damman published a collection of photographs of different ethnic groups in Anthropologisch-ethnographisches Album in Photographien. and in the same year William Marshall published A phrenologist amongst the Todas, or the Study of a Primitive Tribe in South India. History, Character, Customs, Religion, Infanticide, Polyandry, Language. Thomas Huxley established a system of photographing the human body with fixed views which included a rod of known dimension to make measurements. Francis Galton believed it was possible to systematically organize traits of inheritable attributes, intellectual, moral and physical with respect to families, groups, classes and racial types. He believed that mental attributes could be measured by studying physical attributes. In an effort to identify and group characteristics, he made composites of up to two hundred photographs to create a universal physiognomy example of a group or type.

Dr. Reed B. Bontecou, a physician and soldier from New York, took the camera to the American Civil War (1861–1865) and photographed wounded soldiers as well as documenting treatments, surgeries and working conditions of the physician. The albums of wounded American Civil War soldiers treated and photographed by Bontecou have appeared in numerous exhibitions, many of the images were displayed at the Metropolitan Museum of Art as part of the Photography and the American Civil War exhibition. The Burns Archive Press book Shooting Soldiers: Civil War Medical Photography By Reed B. Bonteco, contains a large selection of these photographs and a history of Bontecou.

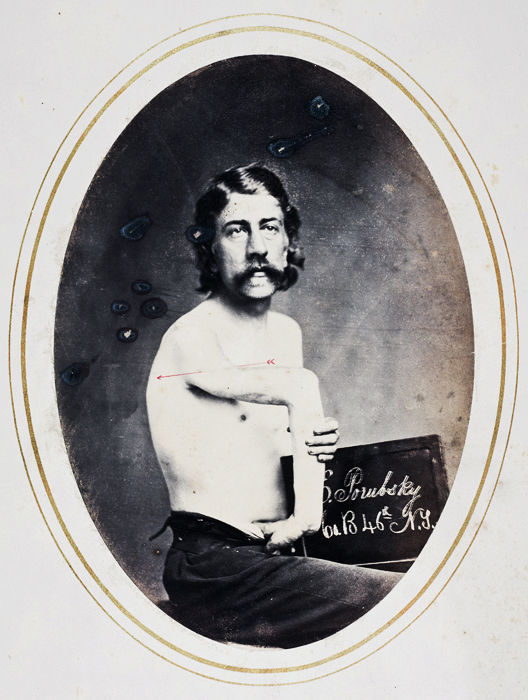
Photo from the book, Shooting Soldiers: Civil War Medical Photography by Dr. R. B. Bontecou. Written by Dr. Stanley B. Burns, Published by Burns Archive Press. This photograph depicts G. Porubsky, Co B. 46th NY volunteer displaying excision of the humerus. This photograph from Bontecou's teaching album shows the drawn-in suspected path of the bullet. Bontecou's operation of bone removal in the upper arm left the patient with a useless limb. Many were amputated in the antiseptic era of the 1880s.

Attempts to publish medical photographs in anatomy text books was met with limited success in the early years of photography. The lack of textural and tonal variation made photographs difficult to interpret. This may have been due to the spectral sensitivity of early materials to blue, violet and ultra-violet light. This grouped the other tones together and rendered them as similar shades of black. Orthochromatic plates did not become commercially available until 1883 and even then the process allowed separation only of the blues, greens and yellows. In 1861, Nicolaus Rüdinger published Atlas des peripherischen Nervensystems des menchlichen Körpers, Cotta’schen, using photographs by Joseph Albert of frozen sections. The photographs had to be retouched to make the structures obvious. Stereophotography became of interest as a way to add a three-dimensional quality to show the spatial relationships of gross anatomy and clinical case studies. Between 1894 and 1900, Albert Neisser of Leipzig produced a stereo atlas of anatomy and pathology. David Waterston published a set of stereo cards in 1905 to be used in a stereo-viewer. The cards showed labelled dissections, descriptive labels and came packaged with the stereoscopic viewer.

There were attempts to photograph inside the body as early as 1883. Emil Behnke used a carbon arc lamp, lenses and reflectors to photograph human vocal cords at exposures of ¼ second. Walter Woodbury had published a “photogastroscope” in 1890 that showed pictures of the interior of the stomach and in 1894, Max Nitze published photographs of the bladder using a cystoscope.

By 1870, Maury and Duhring had established a journal based on using medical photography, The Photographic Review of Medicine and Surgery, published by Lippincott in Philadelphia, USA provided case studies and before and after photographs. Most major centres of medical education had adopted photography as a method of documentation and study by the 1900s. Many photographers were working in multi-faceted disciplines from radiology, pathology and ophthalmology. Medical photography became a special field of photography and in 1931 a group of photographers working in medicine came together at Yale University in the United States of America to form the Biological Photographic Association, which later became the BioCommunications Association Inc. The group published a journal; the Journal of Biological Photography which was later incorporated into the Journal of BioCommunication. Other organizations formed in England, Scandinavia and Australia. Photography continues today to play a role in medicine through documentation, research and education.

== Patient consent issues ==
With the ubiquitous use of mobile phones for medical photography, mobile phone use for medical photography has been a rising issue in Canada. From 2000, the federal and provincial governments of Canada passed legislation to regulate the use, collection and disclosure of medical photography by healthcare professionals. As a result, Canadian companies have developed to create specialized mobile apps, such as ShareSmart, and businesses have sought to provide solutions to comply with the new regulatory scheme.

== Objectification ==
The agency of portrayed persons is not only an issue of consent, but also in regard to their portrayal and use of the imagery, with racialized and sexualized photography as particular cases of misuse.

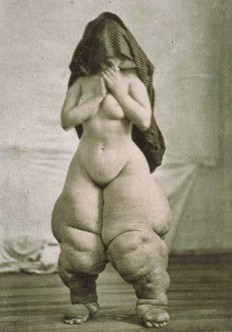
A striking example of objectification. Published as Bellevue Venus by Oscar G. Mason, for depicting elephantiasis.

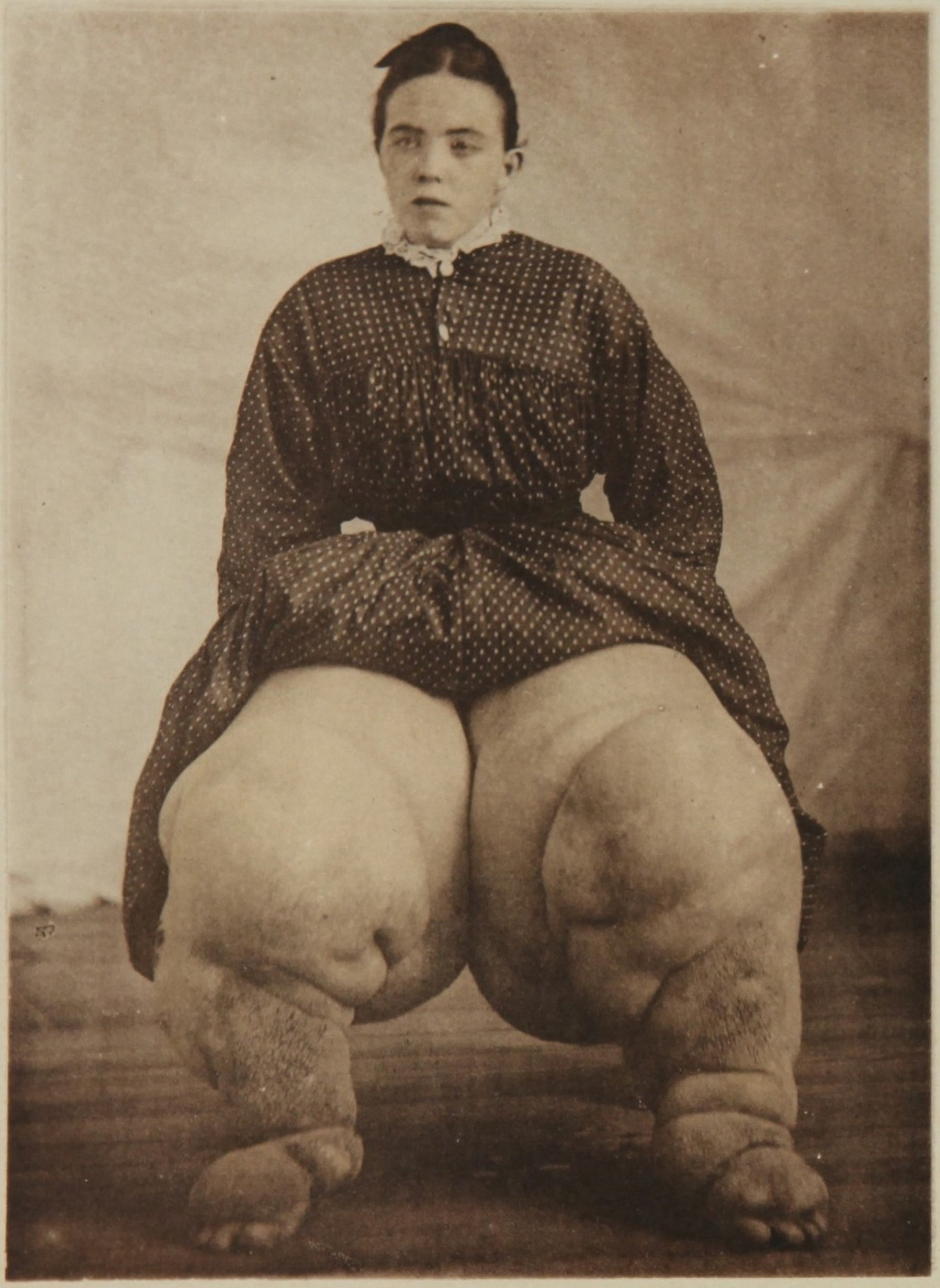
For contrast an alternative, less exposing picture of the same person.

== See also ==
- Race and health
