= Burns Archive =

Private collection of early medical photography and historic photographs

- Founded: 1977
- Founder: Dr. Stanley B. Burns
- Country of origin: United States
- Headquarters location: New York City, New York
- Publication types: Books, photographic historic texts, medical journal articles, exhibition supplements
- Nonfiction topics: Historic Photography, Medical Photography, Post-Mortem Photography
- Imprints: Burns Archive Press
- Official website: www.burnsarchive.com

The Burns Archive is the world’s largest private collection of early medical photography and historic photographs, housing over one million photographs. While it primarily contains images related to medical practises, it is also famous for photographs depicting 'the darker side of life'. Other themes prevalent throughout the collection involve death, crime, racism, and war.

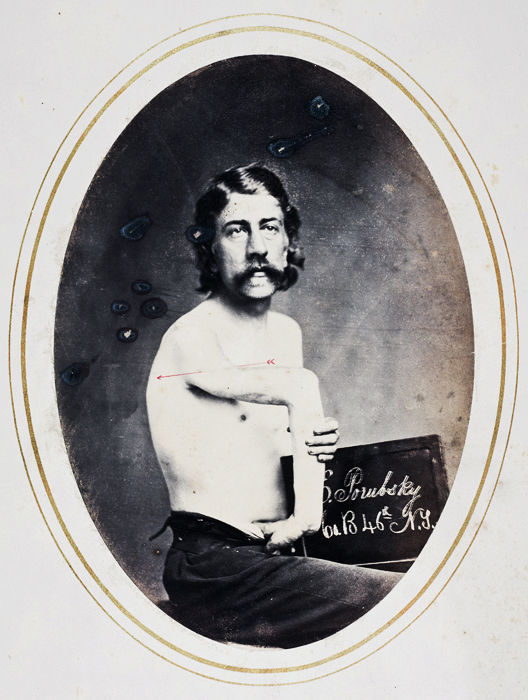
Photo from the book, Shooting Soldiers: Civil War Medical Photography by Dr. R.B. Bontecou. Written by Dr. Stanley B. Burns, published by Burns Archive Press. This photograph depicts G. Porubsky, Co B. 46th NY volunteer soldier displaying excision of the humerus. This photograph from Bontecou's teaching album shows Bontecou's operation of bone removal in the upper arm, which left the patient with a useless limb.

== About ==
Known as one of the world’s most important repositories of early medical history, images of “the darker side of life” make up the collection: anatomical and medical oddities, memorial and post-mortem photography, and original historic photographs depicting death, disease, disaster, crime, racism, revolution, riots, and war. The collection traces the history of photography, from its beginnings in 1839 to the 1950s, and includes hundreds of thousands of Daguerreotypes, ambrotypes, tintypes, carte de visites, and hand-colored photographs. The Burns Archive actively acquires, donates, researches, lectures, exhibits, consults, and shares its rare and unusual photographs and expertise worldwide.

The Archive’s medical collection houses photographs in the categories of pioneers and innovators, operative scenes, therapy and treatments, disease and pathology, medical specialties, interesting cases and medical curiosities, hospitals and wards, nursing, alternative practitioners, anatomy and education, laboratories and doctors’ offices, medicine and war, and more. Many of these collected pictures allowed the medical community of the era to share knowledge and define pathology. The Archive's historical collection ranges from categories of death and memorial, war and conflict, and crime and punishment, to occupations and industry, social and cultural history, photographic history, Judaica, Egyptology, ethnology, folk, and African American history. The collection has been featured in over 100 exhibitions at museums and galleries worldwide, including New York’s Metropolitan Museum of Art and Paris' Musée d'Orsay, and has donated thousands of images to institutions, including The Smithsonian Institution, the Museum of Modern Art, and the J. Paul Getty Museum.

Having written over 1,100 articles and over 40 books, the Burns Archive has published photographic historic texts ranging from Victorian era funeral portraits to early oncology. Dr. Burns authored Sleeping Beauty: Memorial Photography In America, and Forgotten Marriage: The Painted Tintype & The Decorative Frame, 1860–1910, A Lost Chapter in American Portraiture, which both received the American Photographic Historical Society's award for the best publication of their kind, an honor never before bestowed on one author. Sleeping Beauty (disambiguation) was praised by Pulitzer Prize winning author, John Updike, in the American Heritage (magazine) article he wrote on the book. Burns Archive Creative Director, Elizabeth A. Burns, co-authored various books with Dr. Burns, including Sleeping Beauty II: Grief, Bereavement & the Family, American and European Traditions, as well as Geisha: A Photographic History, 1872–1912, and Stiffs, Skulls, and Skeletons, released in 2014 from Schiffer Publishing.

Images from the Burns Archive have been a major source for various documentaries (Ken Burns, the History channel, PBS American Experience), television series (NBC’s Hannibal, HBO’s Autopsy, Travel Channel’s Mysteries at the Museum, Cinemax's The Knick), and feature films (The Silence of the Lambs, Gangs of New York, The Others), and has inspired artists from Joel Peter Witkin to makeup artists for Jacob's Ladder.

Stanley B. Burns MD, Elizabeth A. Burns, and The Burns Archive, serve as the medical, historical and technical advisers for Steven Soderbergh’s period medical Cinemax series, The Knick, starring Clive Owen. The Knick looks at the professional and personal lives of Dr. John W. Thackery (played by Owen) and the staff at New York's Knickerbocker Hospital during the early part of the twentieth century. The Archive was instrumental in the recreation of turn-of-the-century medicine, as Dr. Burns worked closely with production and the actors to make the hospital scenes realistic and authentic to the period. Dr. Burns provided immersive tutorials in the world of early-20th-century surgery, complete with hands-on practice. The Archive's extensive photographic record of medical history served as comprehensive resources for procedures and became important references for everything from the antiseptic atomizers in the operating theater to an early X-ray machine, to the prosthetic worn by a recurring character.

In 2020 the Harvey Cushing/John Hay Whitney Medical Library at Yale acquired 15,400 photographs from The Burns Archive. The photographs are now held in the Stanley B. Burns, M.D., historic medical photography collection.

== Origins ==
Dr. Stanley B. Burns, the Archive’s Founder, is a New York City ophthalmologist who acquired his first medical photograph in 1975 and established the Burns Archive in 1977. The Archive began receiving recognition in 1978, when a selection of its 19th and 20th century photographs were featured in the Time Life Encyclopedia of Collectibles entry on photographs. The Archive was called “one of the world’s most important repositories of early medical history” by The New York Times, “the world’s greatest collection of early medical photography” by New York (magazine), “one of the six most important collections in the world” by Aperture (magazine), “one of America’s Top 100 Collectors” by Art and Antiques Magazine, and “the most important privately held photo archive in the world” by New York’s The Village Voice.

== Books ==
The Burns Archive, through Burns Archive Press and other publishers, has published over 40 books in 40 years, including:

- (2017) Setting Sun: Painted Photographs of Meiji Japan, with Elizabeth A. Burns
- (2017) Mensur & Schmiss: German Dueling Societies, A Photographic History, Elizabeth A. Burns
- (2014) Stiffs, Skulls, & Skeletons: Medical Photography and Symbolism, with Elizabeth A. Burns
- (2012) Mirror, Mirror: The Burns Collection Daguerreotypes
- (2011) Shooting Soldiers: Civil War Medical Photography By R.B. Bontecou
- (2011) Sleeping Beauty III: Memorial Photography: The Children
- (2009) Ophthalmology: A Photographic History 1845–1945, Volumes 1–4
- (2008) Deadly Intent: Crime and Punishment Photographs from the Burns Archive
- (2008) News Art: The Manipulated Photographs from the Burns Archive
- (2007) Nephrology: A Photographic History 1840–1950, Volumes 1–4
- (2007) Seeing Insanity: Photography & The Depiction of Mental Illness
- (2006) Geisha: A Photographic History 18721912, with Elizabeth A. Burns
- (2006) Patients & Promise: A Photographic History of Mental & Mood Disorders, Vol 1–4
- (2005) Photographic History of Early Podiatry: Selections from the Burns Archive
- (2005) Skin Pictures: Masterpiece Photographs Of Nineteenth Century Dermatology, Volumes 1–4
- (2004) Oncology: Tumors & Treatment A Photographic History 1845–1945, Volumes 14
- (2003) Respiratory Disease: A Photographic History, 1845–1945
- (2002) Sleeping Beauty II: Grief, Bereavement and The Family In Memorial Photography with Elizabeth A. Burns
- (2002) The American Dentist: A Pictorial History
- (1998) American Surgery: An Illustrated History
- (1998) A Morning's Work: Medical Photographs from The Burns Archive & Collection 1843–1939
- (1995) Forgotten Marriage: The Painted Tintype & The Decorative Frame, 1860–1910, A Lost Chapter in American Portraiture
- (1994) Harm's Way: Lust & Madness, Murder & Mayhem, with Joel Peter Witkin
- (1993) Face of Mercy: A Photographic History of Medicine at War
- (1991) Photographie Et Medecine: 1840–1880
- (1990) Sleeping Beauty: Memorial Photography in America
- (1987) Masterpieces of Medical Photography: Selections from the Burns Archive, with Joel Peter Witkin
- (1983) American Medical Publication With Photographs (Monograph) New York State Journal of Medicine
- (1983) Early Medical Photography in America: 1839–1883
- (1980) Civil War Medical Photography, (Monograph) New York State Journal of Medicine

== Films ==
The Burns Archive has contributed images, as well as consulting and advisory services to various feature films, including:

- The Others, directed by Alejandro Amenábar, starring Nicole Kidman
- Total Recall, starring Arnold Schwarzenegger
- Silence of the Lambs, starring Anthony Hopkins and Jodie Foster
- Gangs of New York, directed by Martin Scorsese, starring Leonardo DiCaprio
- Sleepers, starring Robert De Niro, Dustin Hoffman, Brad Pitt, Kevin Bacon
- Men in Black III, starring Will Smith
- Looking for Richard, directed by Al Pacino
- Jacob's Ladder, starring Tim Robbins
- Fur, starring Nicole Kidman
- Mrs. Parker and the Vicious Circle, produced by Robert Altman
- The Haunting in Connecticut, directed by Peter Cornwell
- Mother Night, a film adaptation of the Kurt Vonnegut novel
- The Proposition, written by Nick Cave
- Idlewild, starring André 3000

== Documentaries and television ==
The Burns Archive has contributed images, as well as consulting and advisory services, to various documentaries and television series, including:

- The Knick via Cinemax, directed by Steven Soderbergh, starring Clive Owen
- The Civil War via Ken Burns and PBS
- Lincoln at Gettysburg via PBS
- Hannibal via NBC
- The Poisoner's Handbook via the PBS American Experience
- Flight from Death, directed by Patrick Shen, a seven-time Best Documentary award-winning film
- Who Do You Think You Are via NBC
- Mysteries at the Museum via the Travel Channel
- History's Mysteries via The History Channel
- Autopsy with Michael Baden via HBO
- Mercy Street via PBS
