= Mr. Ruggerio's Neighborhood =

- The Sopranos episode
- Episode no.: Season 3 Episode 1
- Directed by: Allen Coulter
- Written by: David Chase
- Cinematography by: Alik Sakharov
- Production code: 302
- Original air date: March 4, 2001
- Running time: 49 minutes

Episode chronology
← Previous "Funhouse"	Next → "Proshai, Livushka"
- The Sopranos season 3

"Mr. Ruggerio's Neighborhood" is the 27th episode of the HBO original series The Sopranos and the first of the show's third season. It was written by David Chase and directed by Allen Coulter, and originally aired on March 4, 2001.

== Starring ==
- James Gandolfini as Tony Soprano
- Lorraine Bracco as Dr. Jennifer Melfi *
- Edie Falco as Carmela Soprano
- Michael Imperioli as Christopher Moltisanti
- Dominic Chianese as Corrado Soprano, Jr. *
- Steven Van Zandt as Silvio Dante
- Tony Sirico as Paulie Gualtieri
- Robert Iler as Anthony Soprano, Jr.
- Jamie-Lynn Sigler as Meadow Soprano
- Drea de Matteo as Adriana La Cerva
- Aida Turturro as Janice Soprano *
- Federico Castelluccio as Furio Giunta

* = credit only

=== Guest starring ===
- Jerry Adler as Hesh Rabkin

==== Also guest starring ====
- Louis Lombardi as Skip Lipari
- Ari Graynor as Caitlin Rucker
- John Fiore as Gigi Cestone
- Dan Grimaldi as Patsy Parisi and Philly Parisi
- Frank Pellegrino as Frank Cubitoso
- Saundra Santiago as Jean Cusamano
- Michele DeCesare as Hunter Scangarelo
- Erica Leerhsen as Birgit Olafsdottir
- Albert Makhtsier as Stasiu Wosilius
- Katalin Pota as Lilliana Wosilius
- Robert Bogue as Ed Restuccia
- James Murtaugh as Judge Lapper
- Frank Pando as Agent Grasso
- Matt Servitto as Agent Harris
- Neal Jones as Agent Tancredi
- Glenn Kessler as FBI Tech #2
- Anthony Indelicato as S.E.T. #1
- Frank Deal as R & D #1

== Synopsis ==
FBI agents are conferring about Tony Soprano. They have been listening to his phone calls for years without hearing anything incriminating, and the recordings made by Pussy Bonpensiero also reveal nothing. Using Pussy's file number, CW16, Agent Skip Lipari says that he is "probably compost"; Agent Frank Cubitoso removes Pussy's photograph from the wall and throws it away. Lipari reports that Tony goes to his basement to talk with his associates, believing the conversations will be masked by the noise of the central air conditioning units. They obtain legal authorization to plant a listening device there.

Once a week the house is empty for long enough for the agents to examine the basement and later install the listening device. The first week they enter and find an old reading lamp in which a microphone could be hidden. They take pictures of it so they can replace it with a replica with a hidden listening device. In the second week, their plan is aborted when the house's water heater fails and the basement is flooded. In the third week, they successfully plant the replacement lamp and start listening.

Meadow adjusts to life at Columbia University. Her volatile roommate, Caitlin, is having a hard time.

Tony and the crew eat lunch in the back room of Satriale's. Patsy Parisi is not eating, mourning his identical twin Philly on their birthday. Patsy suspects that Tony had something to do with Philly's death. One afternoon, while the FBI watches Tony's house, they see a drunken Patsy on the pool patio aiming a gun at Tony through the window. Patsy can see Tony clearly in the house, but lowers the gun, turns around, and urinates in the pool. Tony does not see any of this. Some days later, Tony confronts Patsy when they are alone. He tells him that the past is past; he compels and cajoles him into declaring, twice, that he has put his grief behind him.

== First appearance ==
- Caitlin Rucker: Meadow's roommate at her college dormitory.

== Final appearance ==
- Skip Lipari: FBI handler for Pussy Bonpensiero between 1998 and 2000.

== Title reference ==
- Mr. Ruggerio is Tony's neighborhood plumber; Agent Harris says the Soprano house is in "Mister Ruggerio's Neighborhood." This is a reference to the children's TV show Mister Rogers' Neighborhood (which ended the same year that the episode was broadcast).
- The title is also a reference to Angelo Ruggiero, whose home the FBI planted several bugs in, giving them information about John Gotti and the Gambino crime family.

== Production ==
- The episode was part one of a two-hour season premiere when it originally aired in 2001.
- Federico Castelluccio (Furio Giunta) is now billed in the opening credits as part of the main cast, but only in episodes in which he appears.
- First episode in which Nancy Marchand (Livia Soprano) is not billed in the opening credits.
- This episode features a board of what rank the FBI suspects the mobsters of. In turn, revealing that before his death, Mikey Palmice was promoted to the rank of Consigliere.
- FBI Codenames for the Sopranos:
  - Tony - Papa Bing / Der Bingle
  - Carmela - Mrs. Bing
  - Meadow - Princess Bing
  - A.J. - Baby Bing
  - The Soprano residence - The Sausage Factory

== Music ==
- The music playing when Tony walks down his driveway in the first scene is the intro to "Sad Eyed Lady of the Lowlife"' by Alabama 3, who also perform the opening theme song.
- The episode features the "Peter Gunn Theme" (by Henry Mancini) and "Every Breath You Take" (by The Police) mashed up by Kathryn Dayak from HBO. The music is played when the FBI is planting the bug in Tony's house.
- While driving, Tony sings along with Steely Dan's "Dirty Work".
- In the dormitory, when Caitlyn is telling Meadow about the man on the train, "Van Gogh" by Ras Kass is being played in the hallway.
- When Anthony is being picked up for school by his friends, the song heard playing in the car is "Scud Missile" by Ganjah K.
- Tony listens to "Hotel California" by Eagles while exercising at the end of the episode.
- Elvis Costello's "High Fidelity" plays at the very end of the episode, as Tony and Carmela converse in front of the bugged lamp.

== Filming locations ==
Listed in order of first appearance:

- North Caldwell, New Jersey
- Albertus Magnus High School in Bardonia, New York
- Bronx Community College
- Satriale's Pork Store in Kearny, New Jersey
- Glen Ridge, New Jersey
- New City, New York
- Verona Park in Verona, New Jersey
- Bada Bing in Lodi, New Jersey
