= Bontekoe =

Bontekoe is a surname. Notable persons with the name include:

- Cornelis Bontekoe (c. 1644–1685), Dutch physician
- Johan Bontekoe (1943–2006), Dutch swimmer
- Willem Bontekoe (1587–1657), Dutch sea captain

== See also ==
- SS Bontekoe, a Dutch merchant ship of the Koninklijke Paketvaart-Maatschappij, launched in 1922
- Bontecou
