= Oscar G. Mason =

American photographer and radiographer

- Born: Oscar Gleason Mason c. 1830
- Died: March 16, 1921 (aged 90–91)
- Known for: Photography, Radiography

Oscar Gleason Mason (c. 1830 – March 16, 1921), better known as O. G. Mason, was an American photographer and radiographer. For most of his professional life, Mason directed the photographic department of Bellevue Hospital in New York City. He retired from this position in 1906.

== Early years ==
Very little information exists of Mason's activities as a daguerreotypist before he was engaged by Bellevue. Records show that he worked for the Meade brothers as chief camera operator at their 233 Broadway, New York, gallery soon after it opened in 1850. There is also evidence that Mason spent a few years in Northfield, Vermont and Springfield, Massachusetts, before returning to New York sometime in the middle 1860s. It is not clear, however, whether he actually resided in these cities or was simply registered as a freelance photographer and entrepreneur, promoting the services and products from his commercial enterprise, O. G. Mason & Company. According to his obituary in the New York Times, O. G. Mason's affiliation with Bellevue began in 1856. There is very little evidence to support this date, but in a report written for the year 1881, Mason comments on twenty years of research in photomicrography. More than likely this would have included work for the department of microscopy established at Bellevue in 1862. For many years Mason was an officer of the American Microscopical Society of New York.

== Bellevue Photographic Department ==
Blindstamp used by O. G. Mason

The Bellevue Photographic Department was the first of its kind in a civilian hospital. Earlier photographic commissions could be found attached to American military hospitals that cared for wounded Union soldiers during the Civil War, but these precedents came under the authority and pay of the Army Medical Museum founded by Surgeon General Dr. William Hammond in 1862. In France, Dr. Montméja (1841–?) at Hôpital Saint-Louis was photographing for Dr. Alfred Hardy's (1811–1893) atlas of skin diseases but it was not until 1869, when he and Dr. Jules Rengade (1841–?) announced plans for the construction of "un magnifique atelier de photographie" that would serve the hospitals of Paris. The first photographic lab in a German hospital did not appear until 1893 at the Leipzig Medical Clinic.

In 1868 after a year of planning, construction was completed on a department of photography within the former residents quarters of Cook House on Bellevue hospital grounds. Alterations included a 12-by-14-foot skylight and a partitioned space within the laboratory, presumably for a dark room, that measured 6 by 12. Financial oversight was the responsibility of apothecary John Frey and he published the first two reports for the department. All subsequent reports were written by O. G. Mason and sometimes co-signed by Frey. From its inception, photographic production at Bellevue was ambitious and over 1200 positive paper prints were made in 1869. Frey reported the success of the department with these words:

Of the positive paper prints... they have been of such a character as to already attract the attention of the medical profession, not only in our immediate vicinity, but at a distance, and have called forth many expressions of interest and commendation. Members of the medical profession begin to visit the Department periodically, for the purpose of obtaining such photographs as pertain to each one's more especial class of investigation. Many interesting cases of skin disease, fractures, and results of important surgical operations have been fully illustrated by series of photographs, which give opportunity for comparison and study not offered by any other means.

O. G. Mason's duties included photographing deceased unknowns, a service that was pioneered at Bellevue in 1867. Bodies were received in a new facility constructed in 1866, modelled and named after the much larger Paris Morgue. Photographing took place outside and in his report for 1875 Mason petitioned for accommodations that would protect his equipment and subject from inclement weather. Unidentified bodies were displayed up to seventy-two hours on stone tables behind a curtain wall of iron and glass dividing the 20-by-20-foot space. Both photograph and body were numbered correspondingly and any unclaimed bodies were later buried at the Hart Island City Cemetery. Mason's annual reports emphasized the importance of this work and the relief it provided to the bereft who visited the morgue in search of missing loved ones.

== Works ==
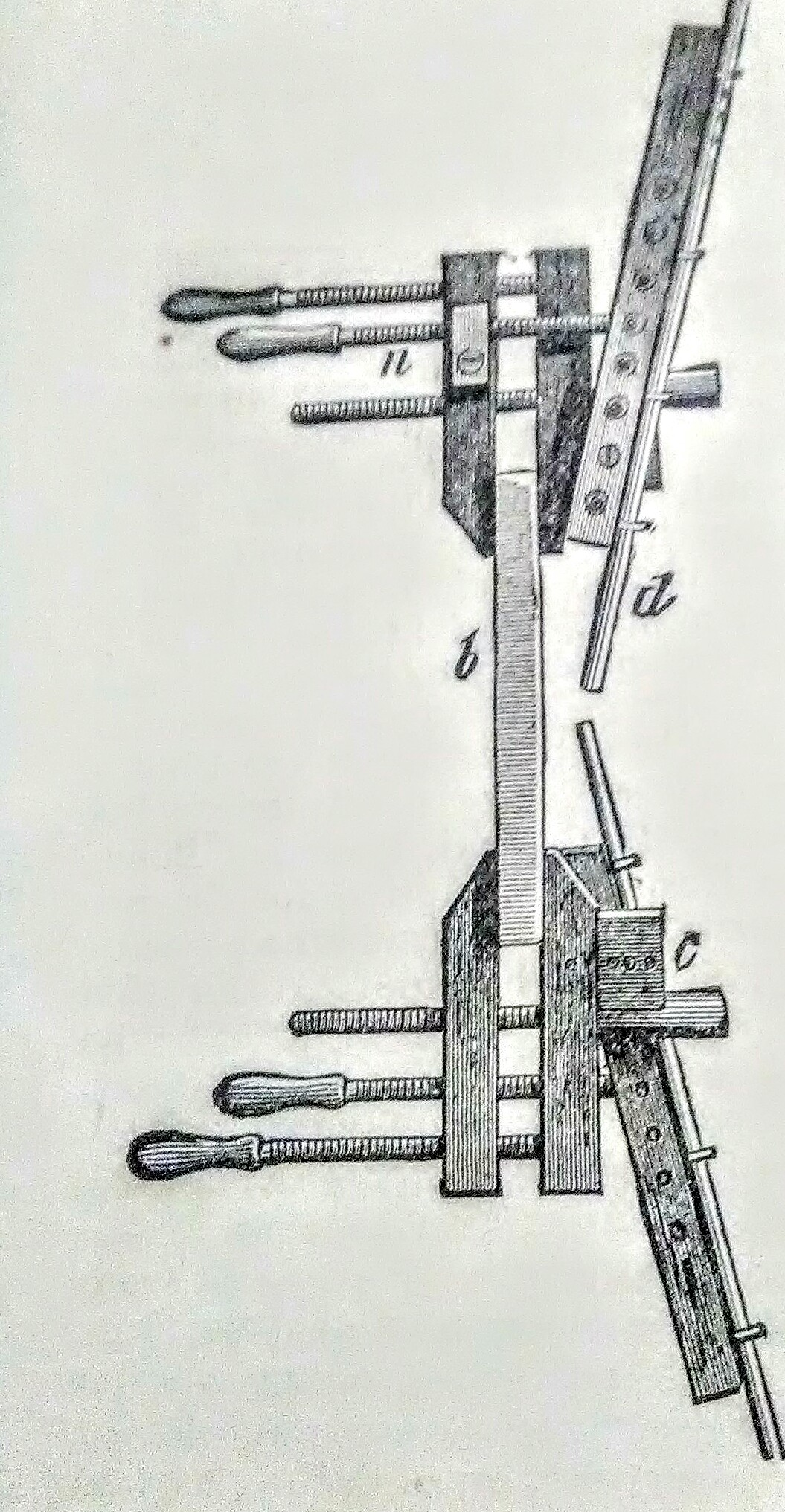
Eight-Inch Handscrew designed by O. G. Mason

O. G. Mason was prominent in his field, a staff contributor to The Photographic Times weekly and The photographic instructor for the professional and amateur series, both publications put out by the press of Scovill Manufacturing Co. in the late 19th century. He served for a time as president of the American Institute, Photographic Section and as both secretary and treasurer, passim, for the American Microscopical Society. Mason consulted for Lewis Morris Rutherfurd on astronomic and spectral photography, and maintained a private office at 333 E. 26th Street for his telescopic and freelance projects. O. G. Mason is best remembered, however, for his clinical medical photography accomplished during his forty plus years at Bellevue Hospital. He was frequently called upon to provide illustrations for monographs published by leading physicians and surgeons associated with the hospital and its medical college, including Lewis Albert Sayre, John Call Dalton, and Francis Delafield. His most notable photographs appeared in the great photographic dermatology atlases written by George Henry Fox.

=== Darkness and Daylight ===
Mason was the photographer for Helen Campbell's 1893 exposé of New York's slums, titled Darkness and Daylight; or Lights and Shadows of New York Life; for this work, his photographic images were rendered as steel engravings. Connections with Piffard, Jacob Riis, flash photography and the Sanitation Commission.

== O. G. Mason today ==
- Suffering and Endurance, by John Wood.
- A Morning's Work, by Stanley Burns, M. D.
- The first photograph of blood transfusion, by Paul J. Schmidt, M. D.
- Fear No Art, exhibition at Oakland Arts Center, Pontiac, Michigan.
