= Eleanor Bontecou =

American lawyer (1891–1976)

- Born: February 14, 1891; Short Hills, New Jersey, U.S.
- Died: March 19, 1976 (aged 85)
- Education: Bryn Mawr College; Harvard University
- Occupations: lawyer, civil rights advocate, law professor, government official

Eleanor Bontecou (February 14, 1891 – March 19, 1976) was an American lawyer, civil rights advocate, law professor and government official. Bontecou served as an attorney and investigator for both the U.S. Department of Justice and U.S. War Department. She also worked as a professor at two universities. During her career, Bontecou achieved national fame for her work in the civil liberties and women's rights movements.

== Early life and education ==
Bontecou was born in Short Hills, New Jersey, a community in Millburn Township, New Jersey. She graduated from the Beard School (now Morristown-Beard School) in Orange, New Jersey. Bontecou then completed her bachelor's degree at Bryn Mawr College in Bryn Mawr, Pennsylvania in 1913. During her time at Bryn Mawr, she earned the Brooke Hall Memorial Scholarship and the Bryn Mawr European Scholarship. After Bonctecou earned her law degree from New York University in 1917, she continued to study law under Felix Frankfurter at Harvard University.

== Civil rights and war crimes investigations ==
In 1943, Bontecou joined the Civil Rights Section in the Criminal Division at the U.S. Department of Justice. She served as one of the first seven attorneys at the agency, the precursor to the Civil Rights Division. Bontecou conducted a comprehensive study of how the U.S. and its allies treated conscientious objectors during World War I. She would later put forward recommendations for better treatment of conscientious objectors in World War II.

In 1946, Bontecou transferred to the War Department (now the Department of Defense). She assisted preparation for the prosecution of major war criminals from the Pacific Theatre of World War II. During 1947, Bontecou visited Nuremberg to investigate and report on war crimes in Germany. During her retirement, she helped victims of unfounded accusations made during the McCarthy era.

== Advocacy to end poll taxes ==
Bontecou gave legal advice to the Southern Conference for Human Welfare to assist its campaign to end poll taxes for black American voters. She also collaborated with political scientist Ralph Bunche on a survey of southern suffrage for the New School for Social Research (now the New School) and the Carnegie Foundation. The study found an association between low wages paid to black Americans and their difficulty paying poll taxes. This hardship factored into decreased participation in voting.

In 1941, Bontecou testified before a Congressional hearing on poll taxes held by a subcommittee of the U.S. Senate Judiciary Committee. She described the long-term study on the effect of poll taxes on voting participation.

== Career in academia ==
In 1922, Bontecou returned to Bryn Mawr as its Acting Dean. She received her Ph.D. from the Brookings Graduate School of Economics and Government (now the Brookings Institution) in 1928. Bonctecou then briefly worked as a professor in the School of Social Service Administration at the University of Chicago until contracting encephalitis lethargica. The long-term illness led her to spend most of the 1930s bedridden. Although Bonctecou eventually attained better health, she experienced lingering lifelong effects, including a tremor in her hands and hampered balance.

== Honors and legacy ==
A law professorship at Seton Hall University in South Orange, New Jersey carries Bontecou's name. In 2011, the Library of Virginia honored her as one of its Virginia Women in History. The Harry S. Truman Library and Museum houses Bontecou's papers.

== Works ==
- The Poll Tax (1942)
- Freedom in the Balance: Opinions of Judge Henry W. Edgerton Relating to Civil Liberties (1960)
- The Federal loyalty-security program (1974)
