= David Fierro =

American actor and director

- Born: 05/11/1975; San Francisco (California)
- Education: Columbia University (MFA)
- Occupation: Actor

David Fierro is an American stage, TV and film actor and director. He is known for the roles of Inspector Jacob Speight on The Knick and roles on Red Oaks and Gotham.

== Early life ==
Fierro is the son of musician Martin Fierro.

== Career ==
Fierro's most notable role has been Jacob Speight in the Cinemax television series The Knick. In 2019, he portrayed Mayor Buddy Gray in the pilot for the CBS crime drama series Tommy, but was replaced by actor Thomas Sadoski before the series was picked up by the network.

== Filmography ==
Year	Title	Role	Notes
1999	Mysterious Circumstances	Emilio	
2000	The Martini Shot	George Saville	
2011	8:46	Vinnie	
2011	One Day More	Vitantonio	
2013	Side Effects	Wards Island Patient 2	Uncredited
2013	Home	Resident	
2014	Birdman	Man in Bar	
2014–2015	The Knick	Inspector Jacob Speight	8 episodes
2015	Gotham	Zaardon	Episode: "Rise of the Villains: Damned If You Do..."
2015–2016	Red Oaks	Ganz	4 episodes
2016	Delinquent	Keegan	
2016	Live by Night	Seppe	
2017	Coin Heist	HVAC Worker	
2018	Alex Strangelove	Mr. Farber	
2018	Weight	Gerard	
2018	Maniac	Bobby	2 episodes
2018	Ask for Jane	Dr. Fredrickson	
2018	Beyond the Night	Mr. Terry Lupas	
2019	The Nearest Human Being	Fred	
2019	Fair Market Value	Hugo	
2019	The Mortuary Collection	Paul	
2020	Worth	Richard	
2020	Clean	Danny Dispatch	
2020	The Trial of the Chicago 7	Bailiff 2	
2025	Hungry	Karl	
2026	Primetime	Raysfan22	
