= Reed Brockway Bontecou =

Reed B. Bontecou
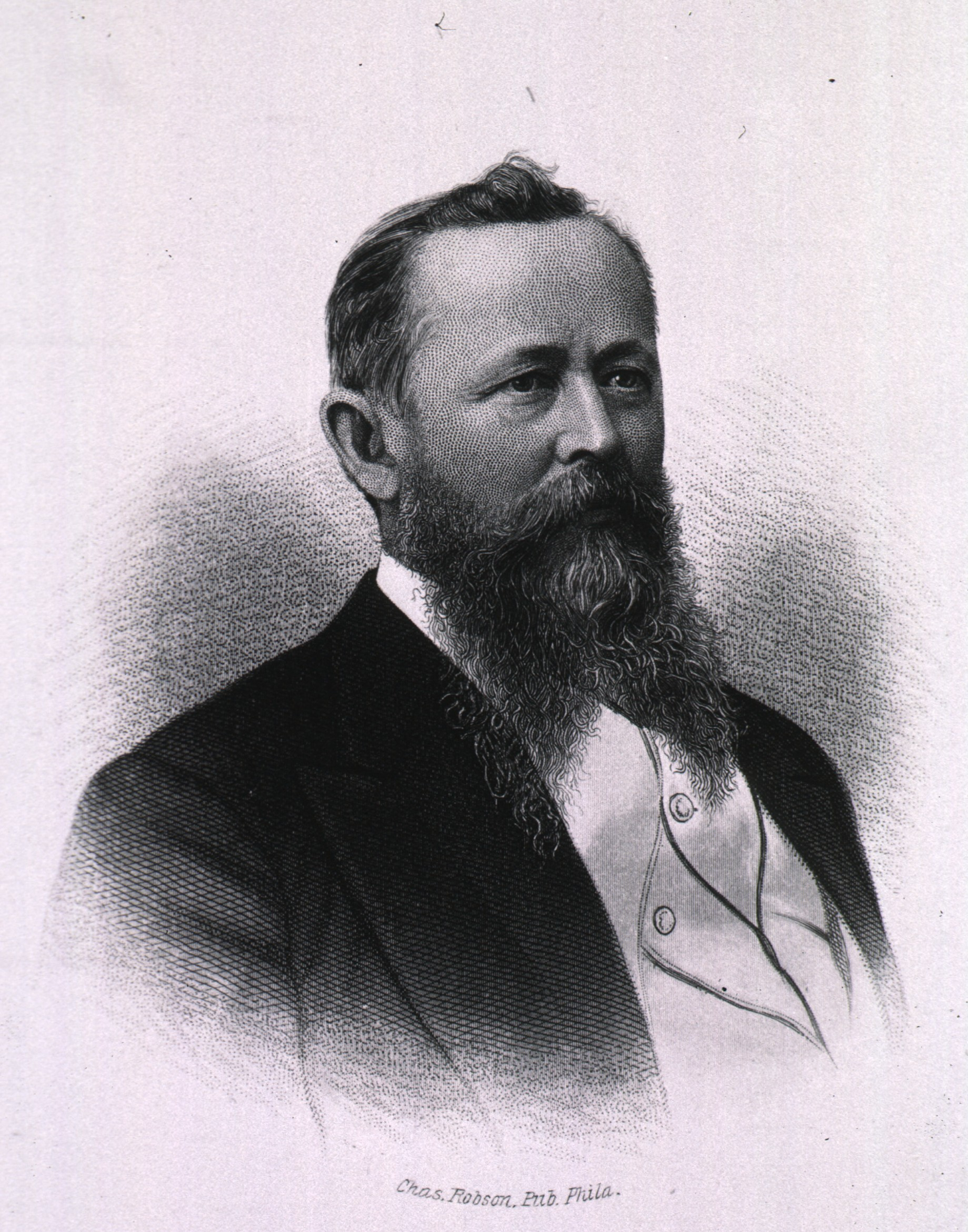
- Born: April 22, 1824; Troy, New York
- Died: March 27, 1907 (aged 82)

Reed Brockway Bontecou (April 22, 1824 – March 27, 1907) was an American surgeon, whose extensive photographic documentation of soldiers' wounds during the Civil War informed medical treatment, and were widely used to determine the degree of injury which determined of post-war pension payments.

Bontecou was born in Troy, New York, the son of Peter and Samantha Brockway Bontecou, of French Huguenot and Scotch ancestry. He graduated B. S. Rensselaer Polytechnic Institute, 1842; was instructor in botany and zoology, 1843; studied medicine with Drs. John Wright and Thomas C. Brinsmade of Troy; attended lectures, medical department, University of the City of New York, 1844–45; made a trip up the Amazon river, 1846, to collect flora and fauna for the Troy Lyceum of Natural History; graduated M. D., Castleton, Vermont, Medical College, 1847, and began to practise in Troy with Dr. Thomas C. Brinsmade.

April 13, 1861, he enlisted in the Civil War as surgeon, Second Regiment, New York State Volunteers, with rank of major and operated on the field at Big Bethel, the first battle of the war. From October, 1863, to June, 1866, he was surgeon in charge of United States Army General Hospital, "Harewood," at Washington, District of Columbia, one of the largest hospitals of the war, with a capacity of 3,000 beds.

On November 21, 1857, while in charge of the Troy Hospital he ligated the right subclavian artery for diffuse traumatic aneurysm of the axillary artery, the first successful case in America and one of the first three on record.

Brevetted lieutenant colonel and colonel of United States Volunteers, March 13, 1865, he resumed private practice in Troy in 1866. For many years he was attending surgeon at Watervliet Arsenal, West Troy, and attending physician and operating surgeon for twenty years at Marshall's Infirmary, Troy, where he made the first operation in this country and the second in the world for typhoidal perforation.

He was a member of the Rensselaer County Medical Society; Medical Society of the State of New York; New York State Medical Association; charter member and fellow, American Surgical Association, 1887.

He married, in 1847, Miss Susan Northrup of New Haven, Connecticut, and had five children. He died in Troy, New York, March 27, 1907.
