= The Knick =

American television drama series

- Genre: Period drama; Medical drama
- Created by: Jack Amiel; Michael Begler
- Written by: Jack Amiel; Michael Begler; Steven Katz
- Directed by: Steven Soderbergh
- Starring: Clive Owen; Andre Holland; Jeremy Bobb; Juliet Rylance; Eve Hewson; Michael Angarano; Chris Sullivan; Cara Seymour; Eric Johnson; David Fierro; Maya Kazan; Leon Addison Brown; Grainger Hines; Matt Frewer; Zaraah Abrahams; Charles Aitken; LaTonya Borsay; Rachel Korine; Tom Lipinski; Michael Nathanson
- Composer: Cliff Martinez
- Country of origin: United States
- Original language: English
- No. of seasons: 2
- No. of episodes: 20 (list of episodes)

Production
- Executive producers: Gregory Jacobs; Steven Soderbergh; Jack Amiel; Michael Begler; Michael Sugar; Clive Owen
- Producer: Michael Polaire
- Production location: New York
- Cinematography: Steven Soderbergh (as Peter Andrews)
- Editors: Steven Soderbergh (as Mary Ann Bernard)
- Running time: 42–57 minutes
- Production companies: AMBEG Screen Products; Anonymous Content; Extension 765

Original release
- Network: Cinemax
- Release: August 8, 2014 – December 18, 2015

The Knick is an American period medical drama television series on Cinemax created by Jack Amiel and Michael Begler and directed by Steven Soderbergh. The series follows Dr. John W. Thackery (Clive Owen) and the staff at a fictionalized version of the Knickerbocker Hospital (the Knick) in New York City during the early twentieth century. Amiel and Begler wrote the majority of the episodes and are executive producers. Owen, Soderbergh, Gregory Jacobs, and Michael Sugar (Anonymous Content) were executive producers.

The 10-episode first season of The Knick premiered on Cinemax on August 8, 2014. Another season, also 10 episodes long, followed on October 16, 2015. In March 2017, Cinemax announced the series was canceled. In 2020, Soderbergh confirmed that a new season of The Knick was in development led by Barry Jenkins, and that Amiel and Begler have written a pilot episode. In 2023, Begler confirmed that a spin-off series was still in development, with the pilot set in 1919 Harlem.

== Premise ==
In New York City in 1900, the Knickerbocker Hospital operates with inventive surgeons, nurses and staff who struggle against the limitations of medical understanding and practice to minimize morbidity and mortality. Dr. John Thackery (partially based on historical figure William Stewart Halsted), the new leader of the surgery staff, balances his cocaine and opium addictions against his ambition for medical discovery and his reputation among his peers. Dr. Algernon Edwards, a Harvard-educated Black American surgeon (probably based on the historical Daniel Hale Williams and Louis T. Wright) who trained in Paris, and is much more qualified than any other candidate, must fight for respect among the all-white hospital staff, as well as in the racially charged city. While struggling to remain financially solvent, the hospital attempts to attract a wealthy clientele, without sacrificing quality of care.

== Cast ==
=== Main ===
- Clive Owen as Dr. John W. "Thack" Thackery: Chief surgeon at the Knickerbocker Hospital, highly talented and respected in the operating room but reckless in his quest for new operating techniques. He is also a drug addict, regularly injecting cocaine during the day and spending nights at a Chinatown opium den.
- André Holland as Dr. Algernon C. Edwards: New Black American assistant chief surgeon at the Knick. Despite his surgical innovations, he encounters constant racism from White doctors and patients. He manages both a secret after-hours clinic in the basement for Black Americans, who ordinarily are turned away from the hospital and a secret passion for Cornelia Robertson.
- Jeremy Bobb as Herman Barrow: Manager of the Knick. He is constantly striving to finance the hospital with wealthy patrons and patients. Having embezzled hospital funds, he is in debt to ruthless mobster Bunky Collier.
- Juliet Rylance as Cornelia Robertson: Head of the Knick's social welfare office. Daughter to Captain August Robertson, she serves as his representative on the board of directors. She is a childhood friend of Edwards, whose parents have worked for her family for years.
- Eve Hewson as Lucy Elkins: Nurse at the Knick. A West Virginia native, she grows close to Thack and Bertie.
- Michael Angarano as Dr. Bertram "Bertie" Chickering, Jr.: An earnest young surgeon at the Knick. He is the son of Dr. Bertram Chickering, Sr. who is displeased with his son's choice of hospitals and admiration of Thack.
- Chris Sullivan as Tom Cleary: Ambulance driver. He augments his income by stealing possessions off those he picks up, as well as earning a fee from Barrow for delivering patients who can pay.
- Cara Seymour as Sister Harriet: Catholic nun and midwife who runs the orphanage affiliated with the Knick. She secretly conducts abortions in her off-hours. At first a foe of Cleary, they form an unlikely friendship.
- Eric Johnson as Dr. Everett Gallinger: Surgeon at the Knick. He despises Edwards for taking the assistant chief surgeon position, which Thack promised to Gallinger. He is virulently opposed to integrating the Knick.
- David Fierro as Jacob Speight: Health department inspector. Although rude and abrasive, he works closely with Cornelia to identify the source of disease outbreaks.
- Maya Kazan as Eleanor Gallinger (née Walcott): Everett Gallinger's wife. The death of their baby Lillian causes her to lose touch with reality.
- Leon Addison Brown as Jesse Edwards: Dr. Edwards' father who works for Captain Robertson as carriage driver.
- Grainger Hines as Captain August Robertson: Cornelia's father, a shipping tycoon and member of the Knick's board of directors. He is fond of Edwards and supports his medical career, which led to his appointment at the Knick over Thackery's objection.
- Matt Frewer as Dr. J. M. Christiansen (season 1): Former chief surgeon at the Knick and Thackery's mentor, who committed suicide after a fatal placenta previa operation. After his death, he appears in flashbacks and Thackery's visions.
- Zaraah Abrahams as Opal Edwards (season 2): Algernon's European wife.
- Charles Aitken as Henry Robertson (season 2; recurring season 1): Cornelia's brother.
- LaTonya Borsay as Evaline Edwards (season 2; recurring season 1): Dr. Edwards' mother and Captain Robertson's cook.
- Rachel Korine as Junia (season 2; recurring season 1): a local prostitute whom Barrow is in love with.
- Tom Lipinski as Phillip Showalter (season 2; recurring season 1): Cornelia's husband.
- Michael Nathanson as Dr. Levi Zinberg (season 2; recurring season 1): the brilliant and generous chief surgeon at Mount Sinai Hospital whom Thackery irrationally views as a rival.

=== Recurring ===
- Jennifer Ferrin as Abigail Alford: Thackery's former lover who comes to him seeking medical help.
- Perry Yung as Ping Wu: Owner of the opium den on Mott Street which Thackery frequents.
- Reg Rogers as Dr. Bertram Chickering, Sr.: Bertie's stern and frequently disapproving father.
- Arielle Goldman as Genevieve Everidge: Pioneering investigative reporter and Bertie's love interest. (season 2)
- Suzanne Savoy as Victoria Robertson: Cornelia's mother.
- Gary Simpson as Hobart Showalter: Phillip's father.
- Molly Price as Effie Barrow: Herman's wife.
- Johanna Day as Eunice Showalter: Phillip's mother.
- Happy Anderson as Mr. James "Jimmy" Fester: Bunky Collier's associate.
- Lucas Papaelias as Eldon Pouncey: Tom Cleary's colleague at the Knick.
- Zuzanna Szadkowski as Nurse Pell: Nurse at the Knick.
- Ylfa Edelstein as Nurse Baker: Nurse at the Knick.
- Ying Ying Li as Lin-Lin: Prostitute owned by Ping Wu.
- Frank Wood as Mr. Havershorn
- Richard James Porter as Monsignor Joseph Mills Lawlor
- John Hodgman as Dr. Henry Cotton
- Emily Bergl as Mrs. Hemming: Dr. Thackery's patient. (season 1)
- Danny Hoch as Bunky Collier: New York mobster to whom Barrow is heavily indebted. (season 1)
- Collin Meath as Phineas "Phinny" Sears: Irish-born New York City cop who tries to figure out how to get his piece of the pie. (season 1)
- Tom Papa as Luff (season 1)
- Stephen Spinella as A.D. Elkins: Revival preacher and Lucy's father. (season 2)
- Linda Emond as Anne Chickering: Bertie's mother. (season 2)
- Ntare Guma Mbaho Mwine as D.W. Garrison Carr: an influential African-American intellectual. (season 2)
- Emily Kinney as Nurse Daisy Ryan. (season 2)
- Annabelle Attanasio as Dorothy Walcott: Eleanor Gallinger's sister. (season 2)
- Andrew Rannells as Frazier H. Wingo: Architect of the new Knick. (season 2)
- Ben Livingston as Dr. William H. Mays, a general practitioner who joins the Knick's surgical staff (season 2)
- Colman Domingo as Dr. Russell Daniels. (season 2)
- Fred Weller as Mr. Brockhurst (season 2)

== Production ==
Promotional poster for season one

Production for season 1 began in September 2013 in New York City. Dr. Stanley Burns, founder and CEO of The Burns Archive, served as the on-set medical adviser on the series, and worked closely with production and the actors to make the hospital scenes realistic and authentic to the period. Images from the Burns Archive became important references for everything from the antiseptic atomizers in the operating theater to an early X-ray machine, to the prosthetic worn by a recurring character.

Jack Amiel and Michael Begler wrote the majority of the first-season episodes, and Steven Soderbergh directed all 10 episodes in the first season. Soderbergh was also the director of photography and editor, under his usual pseudonyms Peter Andrews and Mary Ann Bernard, respectively.

After the conclusion of the second season on December 18, 2015, it was announced that Cinemax had ordered a script for the season three premiere and a season outline, with negotiations for a third season. In a December 2015 interview with director Steven Soderbergh, he confirmed that Dr. Thackery dies in the season two finale, and that it was all planned from the beginning, and Clive Owen only had a two-year contract for the series. Soderbergh also said, "I told them [Cinemax] that I'm going to do the first two years and then we are going to break out the story for seasons 3 and 4 and try to find a filmmaker or filmmakers to do this the way that I did. This is how we want to do this so that every two years, whoever comes on, has the freedom to create their universe." However, Soderbergh decided, depending upon what those future seasons were, he would like to direct them. "We always envisioned The Knick in two-year increments and with the idea of annihilating what came before every two years. In a 2021 interview, Soderbergh outlined his original plan for a six-season series that would involve substantial leaps in time. Seasons 3 and 4 were to be set in the post-WWII era and seasons 5 and 6 in the immediate future. The entire cast and characters were to change.

In March 2017, the series was officially canceled by Cinemax. Kary Antholis, Cinemax's program director, stated that "[d]espite our pride in and affection for the series, as well as our respect for and gratitude towards Steven Soderbergh and his team, we have decided to return Cinemax to its original primetime series fare of high-octane action dramas, many of which will be internationally co-produced."

Gallery

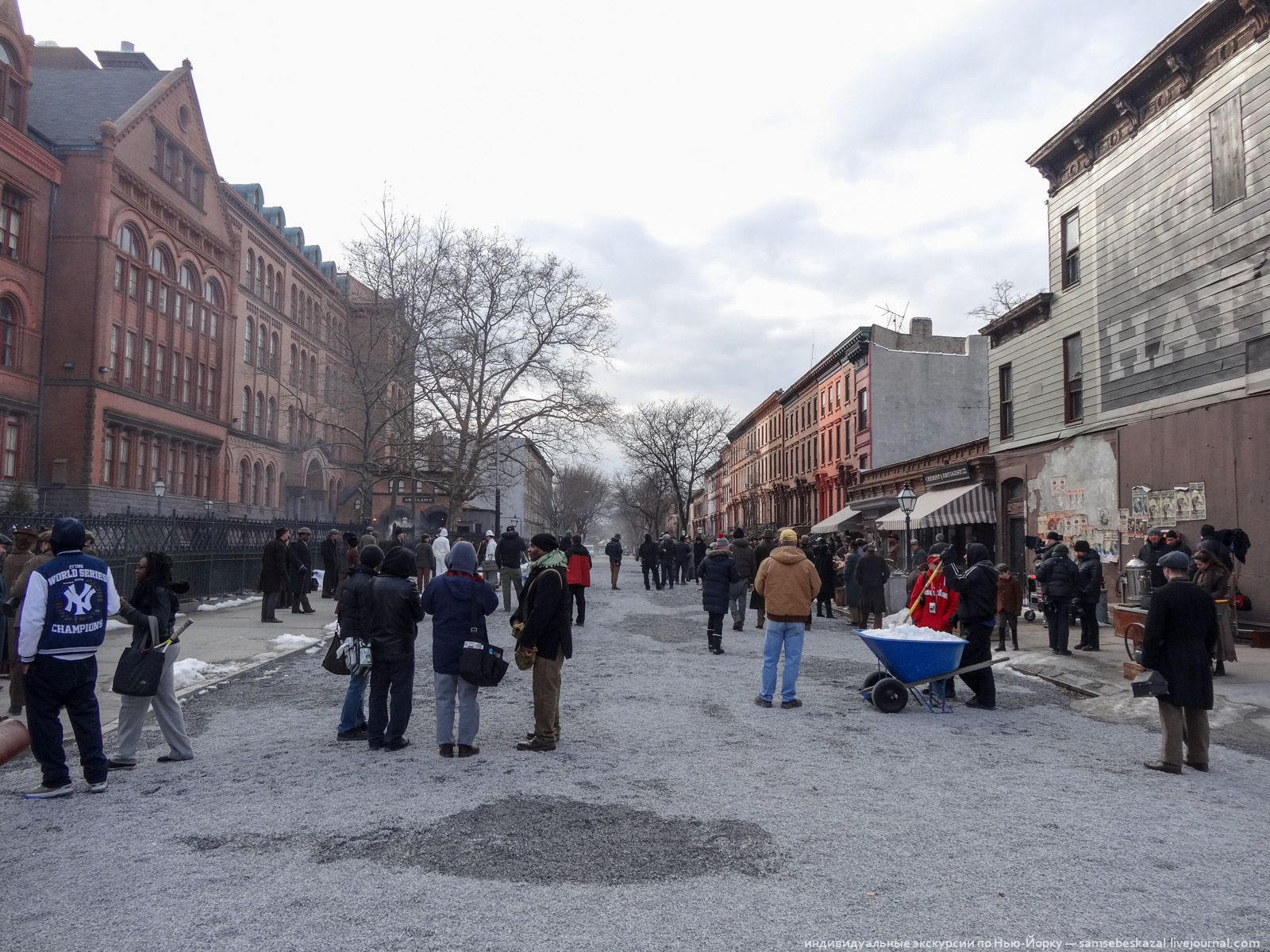
Filming the show in Brooklyn

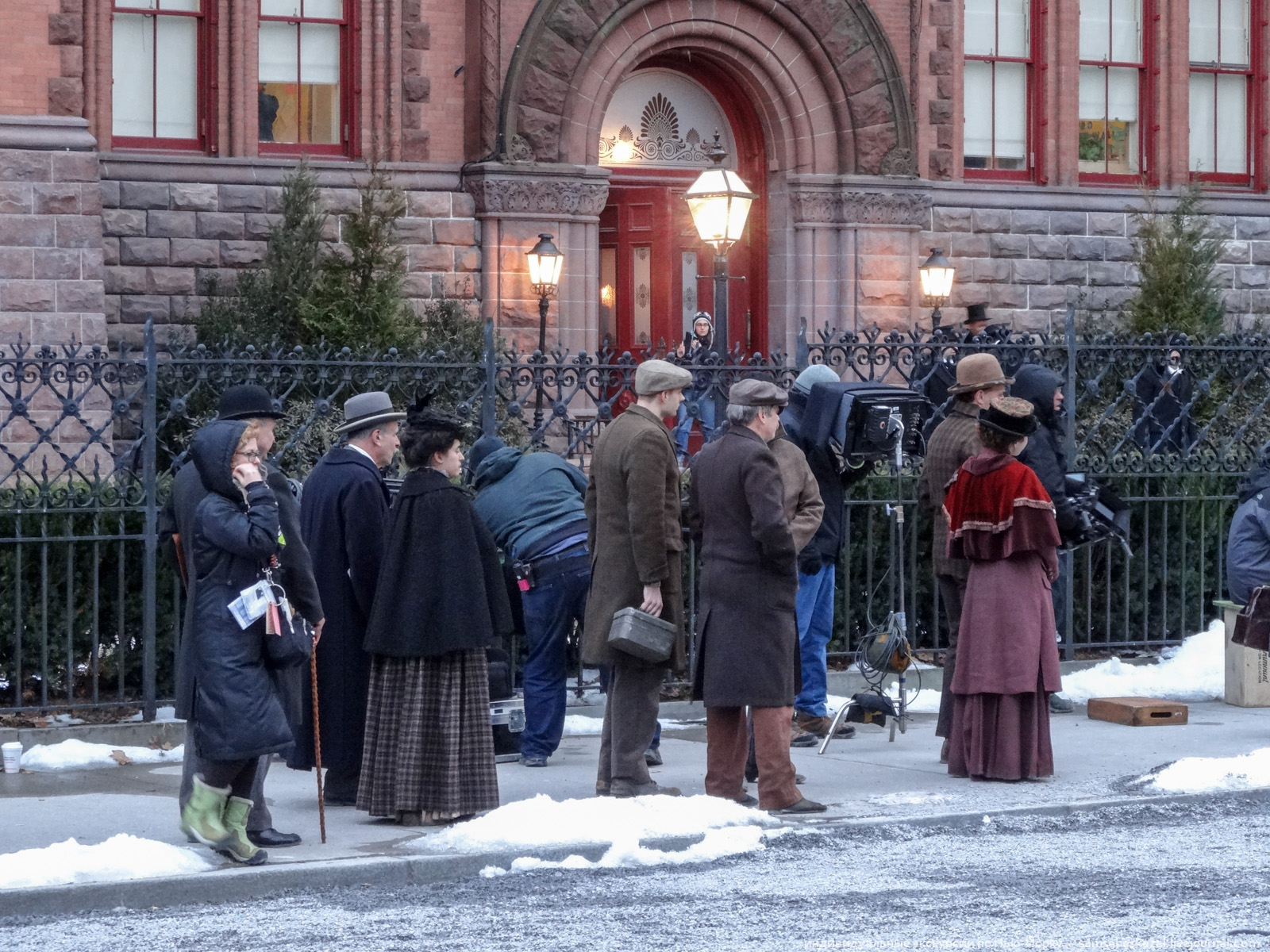
Actors in period clothing during filming

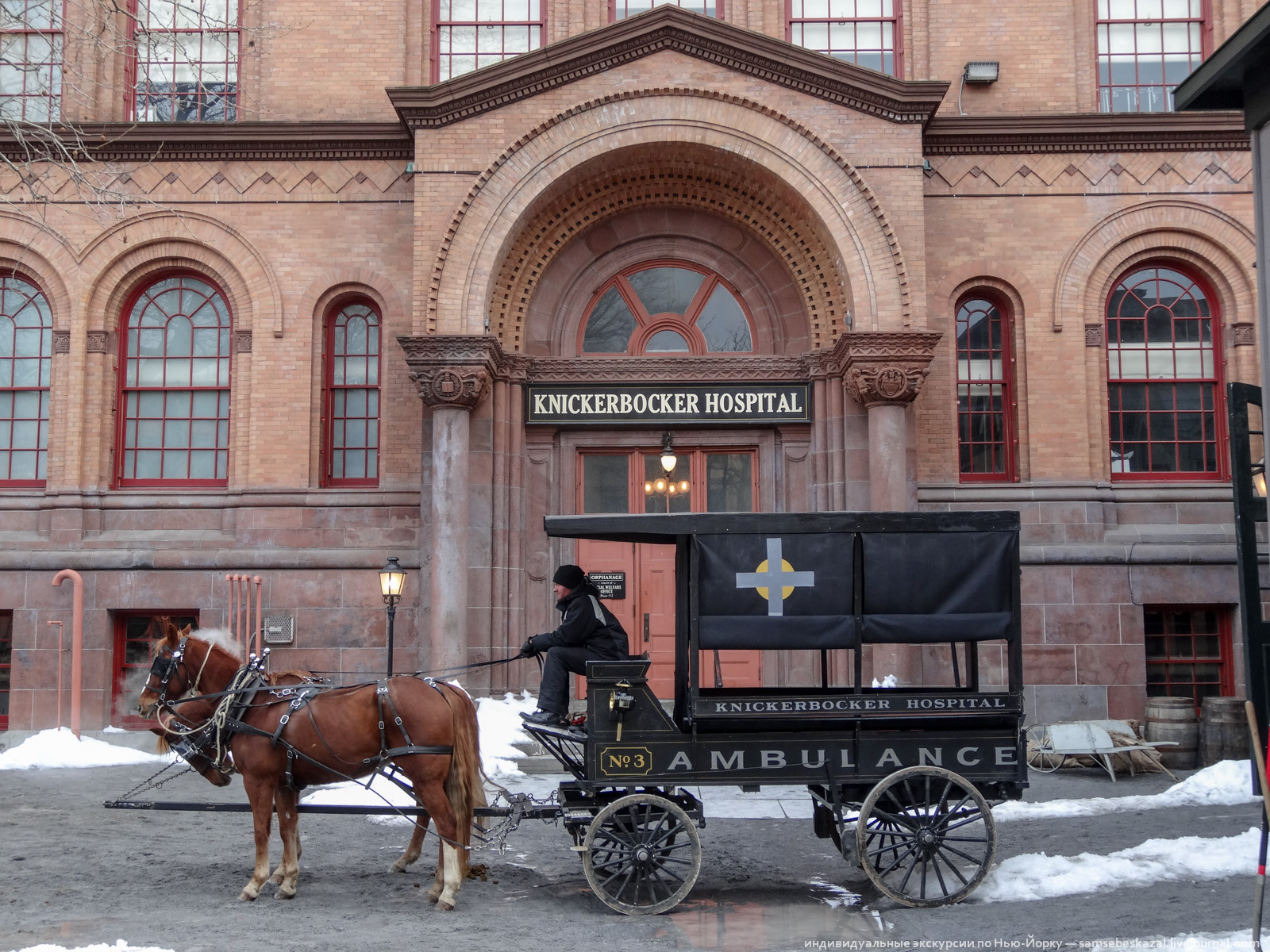
School building dressed up as the Knickerbocker Hospital

== Episodes ==
Season	Episodes	Originally released	
Season	Episodes	First released	Last released
1	10	August 8, 2014	October 17, 2014
2	10	October 16, 2015	December 18, 2015

== Reception ==
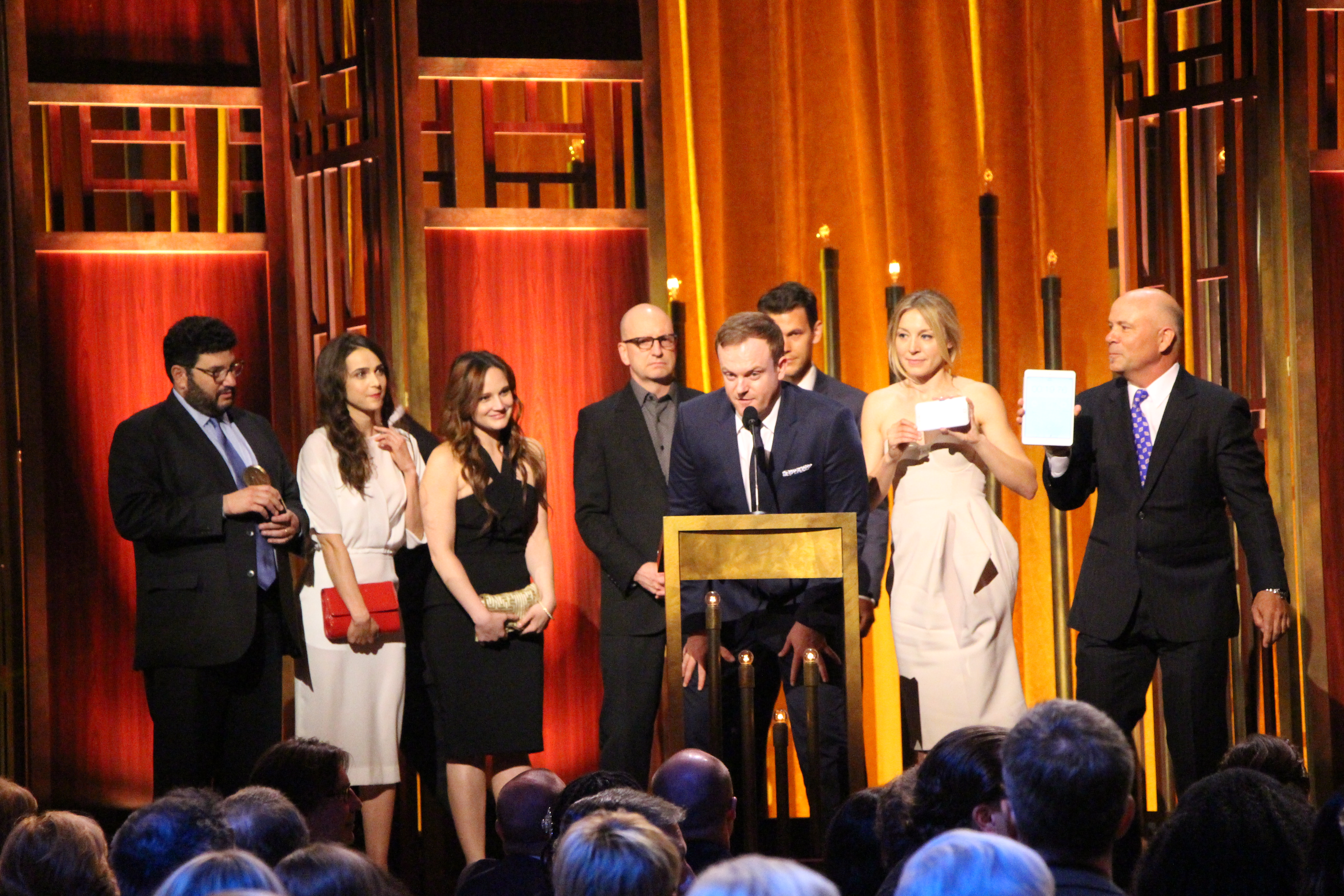
The cast and crew of The Knick at the 74th Annual Peabody Awards.

The first season of The Knick scored 75 out of 100 on Metacritic based on 37 reviews. The review aggregator Rotten Tomatoes reports an 87% critics’ rating with an average rating of 8.3/10 based on 170 reviews. The website consensus reads: "The Knick is sincere, emotional period television that takes a down-to-earth, no-holds-barred approach to vital topics".

After the first season aired, IGN reviewer Matt Fowler gave it an 8.6 out of 10 score, saying "The Knick was impressive, intense television - with fascinating, oft-gruesome topics brought ferociously to the forefront by Soderbergh's adept hand. It was hard to watch at times, both due to gore and pure depressing content, but it was always thought-provoking and incredibly well-rendered." Keith Uhlich of The A.V. Club named the episode "Get the Rope" as his seventh favorite motion picture of 2014.

The second season was scored by Metacritic at 85 out of 100, based on 17 reviews. Rotten Tomatoes gave the second season a 97% approval rating with an average score of 8.55/10 based on 120 reviews, with the critical consensus: "The Knick delivers an addictive second season with stunning visuals, knockout performances, and disturbing moments adding up to a period drama that's anything but dated."

== Accolades ==
Ceremony	Category	Recipient(s)	Result
72nd Golden Globe Awards	Best Actor – Television Series Drama	Clive Owen	Nominated
19th Satellite Awards	Best Drama Series	The Knick	Won
19th Satellite Awards	Best Actor in a Drama Series	Clive Owen	Won
19th Satellite Awards	Best Supporting Actor in a Series, Miniseries or TV Film	Andre Holland	Nominated
19th Satellite Awards	Best Ensemble	Clive Owen, Andre Holland, Jeremy Bobb, Juliet Rylance, Eve Hewson, Michael Angarano, Chris Sullivan, Cara Seymour, Eric Johnson, David Fierro, Maya Kazan, Leon Addison Brown, Grainger Hines, and Matt Frewer	Won
Writers Guild of America Awards 2014	New Series	The Knick	Nominated
74th Peabody Awards	Peabody Award	The Knick	Won
67th Primetime Emmy Awards	Outstanding Directing for a Drama Series	Steven Soderbergh for "Method and Madness"	Nominated
67th Primetime Emmy Awards	Outstanding Production Design for a Narrative Period Program	Howard Cumming, Henry Dunn, and Regina Graves for "Method and Madness"	tied
67th Primetime Emmy Awards	Outstanding Hairstyling for a Single-Camera Series	Jerry DeCarlo, Rose Chatterton, Suzy Mazzarese Allison, Victor De Nicola, and Christine Cantrell for "Get the Rope"	Nominated
67th Primetime Emmy Awards	Outstanding Makeup for a Single-Camera Series (Non-Prosthetic)	Nicki Ledermann, Stephanie Pasicov, Sunday Englis, Cassandra Saulter, Michael Laudati, and LuAnn Claps for "Method and Madness"	Nominated
67th Primetime Emmy Awards	Outstanding Prosthetic Makeup for a Series, Limited Series, Movie or a Special	Justin Raleigh, Kevin Kirkpatrick, Kelly Golden, Ozzy Alvarez, Danielle Noe, Bernie Eichholz, Michael Ezell, and Kodai Yoshizawa for "Crutchfield"	Nominated
6th Critics' Choice Television Awards	Best Drama Series	The Knick	Nominated
6th Critics' Choice Television Awards	Best Actor in a Drama Series	Clive Owen	Nominated
6th Critics' Choice Television Awards	Best Supporting Actor in a Drama Series	Andre Holland	Nominated
68th Directors Guild of America Awards	Outstanding Directing – Drama Series	Steven Soderbergh for "Williams and Walker"	Nominated
68th Primetime Emmy Awards	Outstanding Directing for a Drama Series	Steven Soderbergh for "This Is All We Are"	Nominated

== Home media ==
The first season was released on Blu-ray and DVD in region 1 on August 11, 2015. The set contains all 10 episodes, plus three audio commentaries by cast and crew, and two-minute behind-the-scenes featurettes for the episodes. The second season was released on Blu-ray and DVD in region 1 on August 2, 2016. Bonus features include several behind-the-scenes looks at the costumes and sets, including the extravagant ball constructed for the seventh episode, "Williams and Walker", as well as audio commentaries with cast and crew.
